= Washington Township, Allen County, Indiana =

Washington Township
- Township
- Location of Washington Township in Allen County, Indiana
- Coordinates: 41°08′09″N 85°10′28″W
- Country: United States
- State: Indiana
- County: Allen

Government
  - Type: Indiana township

Area
  - Total: 31.74 sq mi (82.21 km^{2})
  - Land: 31.68 sq mi (82.05 km^{2})
  - Water: 0.062 sq mi (0.16 km^{2})
- Elevation: 820 ft (250 m)

Population (2020)
  - Total: 38,434
  - Density: 1,139/sq mi (439.9/km^{2})
- FIPS code: 18-80342
- GNIS feature ID: 453981

Washington Township is one of twenty townships in Allen County, Indiana, United States. As of the 2010 census, its population was 36,092.

== Geography ==
Washington Township covers an area of 31.74 square miles (82.21 km^{2}); 0.062 square miles (0.16 km^{2}), or 0.20 percent of this is water.

=== Cities and towns ===
- Fort Wayne (northwest quarter)

=== Unincorporated towns ===
- Academie

=== Adjacent townships ===
The township is adjacent to these Indiana townships:

- Aboite (southwest)
- Eel River (northwest)
- Lake (west)
- Perry (northeast)
- St. Joseph (east)
- Wayne (south)

=== Major highways ===
- I-69
- US 27
- US 30
- US 33
- SR 3
- SR 930

=== Airports ===
- Smith Field

=== Cemeteries ===
The township contains three cemeteries: Bethel, Hatfield, and Saint Pauls.
