= St. Joseph Township, Allen County, Indiana =

Saint Joseph Township
- Township
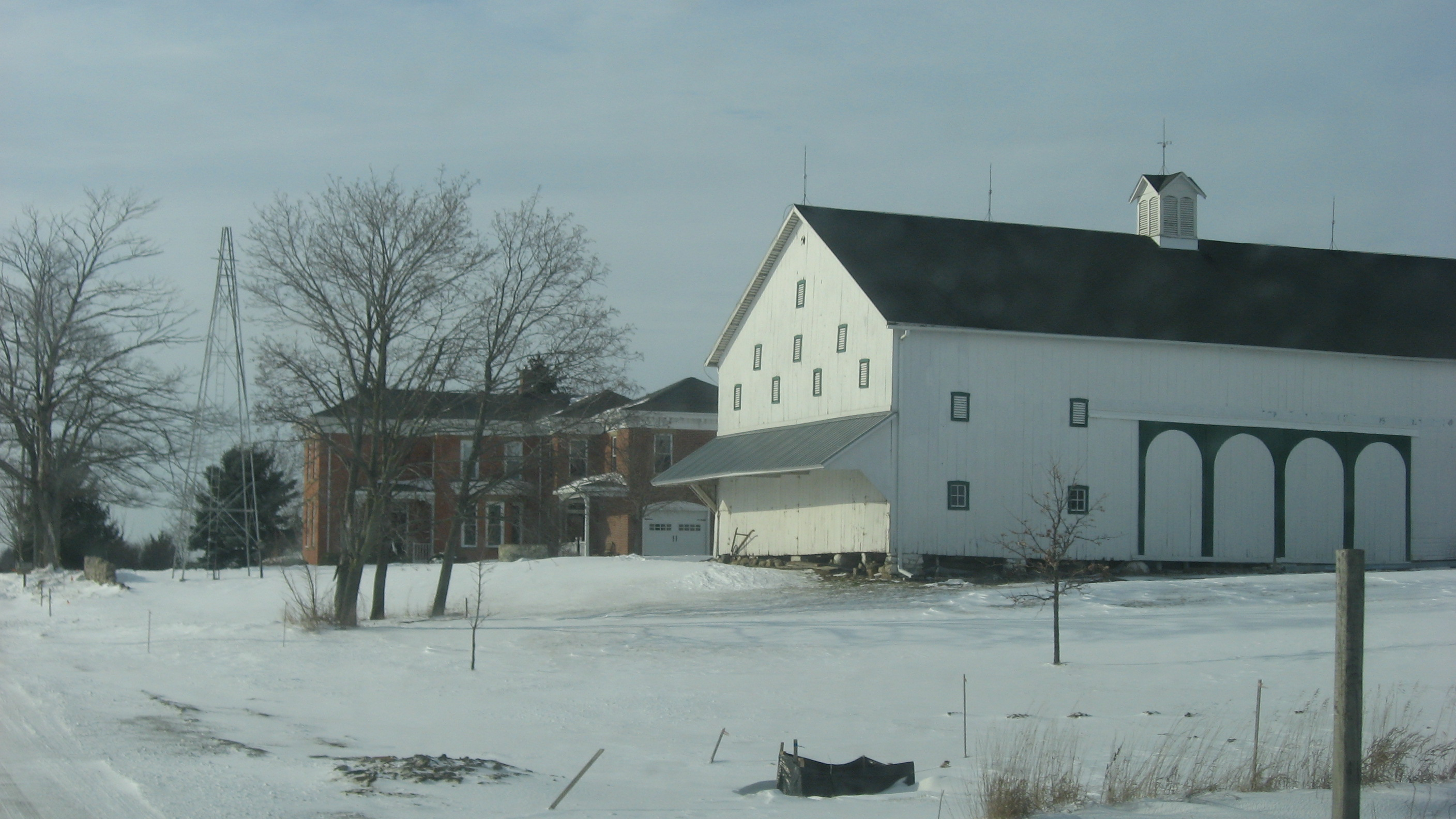
- Martin Blume Jr. Farm, a historic site in the township

- Logo

- Location of St. Joseph Township in Allen County, Indiana
- Coordinates: 41°08′18″N 85°03′50″W
- Country: United States
- State: Indiana
- County: Allen

Government
  - Type: Indiana township

Area
  - Total: 35.53 sq mi (92.01 km^{2})
  - Land: 35.49 sq mi (91.91 km^{2})
  - Water: 0.042 sq mi (0.11 km^{2})
- Elevation: 797 ft (243 m)

Population (2020)
  - Total: 76,266
  - Density: 2,040/sq mi (786/km^{2})
- FIPS code: 18-66924
- GNIS feature ID: 453820
- Website: www.stjosephtwp.com

Saint Joseph Township is one of twenty townships in Allen County, Indiana, United States. As of the 2010 census, its population was 72,245.

== History ==
The Martin Blume Jr. Farm was listed on the National Register of Historic Places in 2006.

== Geography ==
St. Joseph Township covers an area of 35.63 square miles (92.27 km^{2}); 0.042 square miles (0.11 km^{2}), or 0.11 percent, of this is water. The mostly suburban township includes portions of the cities of Fort Wayne (Indiana's second-largest city) and New Haven. The St. Joseph River flows through the western part of the township.

=== Cities and towns ===
- Fort Wayne (northeast portion)
- New Haven (north edge)

=== Adjacent townships ===
The township is adjacent to these Indiana townships:

- Adams (south)
- Cedar Creek (northeast)
- Milan (east)
- Perry (northwest)
- Washington (west)
- Wayne (southwest)

== Education ==
St. Joseph Township is the home of Indiana University – Purdue University Fort Wayne (IPFW). With an enrollment of 14,192, it is the fifth-largest public university campus in Indiana. The township is also home to the Northeast Indiana regional campus of Ivy Tech Community College, the second-largest public community college campus in the state.

St. Joseph Township's private colleges and universities includes Concordia Theological Seminary (Lutheran).

The township is also home to two high schools: R. Nelson Snider High School, a large public school operated by Fort Wayne Community Schools, and Blackhawk Christian School, a private K–12 school operated by Blackhawk Ministries.

== Libraries ==
St. Joseph Township residents are served by the Allen County Public Library's Georgetown Branch.

== Transportation ==
Public transportation in St. Joseph Township is provided by the Fort Wayne Public Transportation Corporation's Citilink and Campuslink bus systems.

=== Major highways ===
- I-69
- I-469 (Ronald Reagan Expressway)
- US 30
- SR 1
- SR 930

== Recreation ==
The City of Fort Wayne operates Shoaff Park in the township, a 184.5-acre (74.7 ha) park located on the banks of the St. Joseph River. The park offers hiking, boating, public golf course, a disk golf course, tennis courts, basketball courts, soccer fields, and a playground with splash pad.

== Climate ==
Climate data for St. Joseph Township, Allen County, Indiana
Month	Jan	Feb	Mar	Apr	May	Jun	Jul	Aug	Sep	Oct	Nov	Dec	Year
Record high °F (°C)	69 (21)	73 (23)	86 (30)	90 (32)	99 (37)	106 (41)	103 (39)	102 (39)	100 (38)	91 (33)	79 (26)	71 (22)	106 (41)
Mean daily maximum °F (°C)	31 (−1)	36 (2)	47 (8)	60 (16)	72 (22)	81 (27)	84 (29)	82 (28)	75 (24)	63 (17)	49 (9)	36 (2)	60 (15)
Mean daily minimum °F (°C)	16 (−9)	19 (−7)	29 (−2)	38 (3)	49 (9)	59 (15)	63 (17)	60 (16)	53 (12)	42 (6)	33 (1)	22 (−6)	40 (5)
Record low °F (°C)	−24 (−31)	−19 (−28)	−10 (−23)	7 (−14)	27 (−3)	36 (2)	38 (3)	38 (3)	29 (−2)	19 (−7)	−1 (−18)	−18 (−28)	−24 (−31)
Average precipitation inches (mm)	2.05 (52)	1.94 (49)	2.86 (73)	3.54 (90)	3.75 (95)	4.04 (103)	3.58 (91)	3.60 (91)	2.81 (71)	2.63 (67)	2.98 (76)	2.77 (70)	36.55 (928)
Source: The Weather Channel.
