= Airport Expressway (Fort Wayne, Indiana) =

Highway in Indiana

Airport Expressway
- Airport Expressway highlighted in red

Route information
- Maintained by City of Fort Wayne Street Department and Allen County Highway Department
- Length: 7.9 mi (12.7 km)
- Existed: July 10, 2001–present

Major junctions
- West end: I-69 near Fort Wayne
- East end: Paulding Road in Fort Wayne

Location
- Country: United States

Highway system
- Allen County Highways

Airport Expressway, is a 7.9-mile (12.7 km) long expressway located in Allen County and the City of Fort Wayne, Indiana. The expressway, completed in 2001, provides access to the Fort Wayne International Airport. Airport Expressway begins as an extension of Lower Huntington Road in rural Allen County at an interchange with Interstate 69 (I–69) exit 299 (formerly exit 99) and travels northeast, then east to end at Fairfield Avenue. None of the highway is listed on the National Highway System. Various sections are rural four-lane undivided highway and urbanized four-lane divided highway.

Airport Expressway was first designated as an expressway in 2001. A section of the highway originally served as part of the Baer Field Thruway, a connection between the Baer Field Airport and the city of Fort Wayne. Some of the route was part of the Indiana State Road system, before the Indiana Department of Transportation decommissioned it.

== Route description ==
Airport Expressway begins at an interchange with I–69 and Lower Huntington Road, as a county highway. The route heads northeast as a four-lane undivided, with a wide median, passing through farmland. The road enters the City of Fort Wayne at an intersection with Smith Road. After Smith Road the expressway passes between the northwest side of the Fort Wayne International Airport and farmland. The expressway turns due east and passes between industrial properties, as a four-lane divided highway. The road has a traffic signal at Ardmore Avenue, with access to the airport terminal. After Ardmore Avenue the route crosses a Norfolk Southern Railroad track. The road turns northeast and has a traffic signal with Bluffton Road, formerly State Road 1 (SR 1). After Bluffton Road the expressway passes through residential properties and crosses over the St. Marys River. The road turns due east after crossing the river and has a traffic signal at Fairfeld Avenue. This intersection is the eastern terminus of Airport Expressway, the route continues east as Paulding Road. Paulding Road heads east, becoming a four-lane undivided highway and has an intersection with U.S. Route 27 (US 27).

No segment of Airport Expressway in Fort Wayne is included in the National Highway System (NHS). The NHS is a network of highways that are identified as being most important for the economy, mobility and defense of the nation. The highway is maintained by the City of Fort Wayne like other major streets in the city. The department tracks the traffic volumes along all major streets as a part of its maintenance responsibilities using a metric called average annual daily traffic (AADT). This measurement is a calculation of the traffic level along a segment of roadway for any average day of the year. In 2012, City of Fort Wayne figured that the lowest traffic levels were 7,400 vehicles used the highway daily between Coverdale Road and Smith Road. The peak traffic volumes were 14,800 vehicles AADT along the section of Airport Expressway between Winchester Road and Paulding Road.

== History ==
Airport Expressway was planned in the 1970s, it would have followed mostly Dalman Road. The first section of Airport Expressway opened as Baer Field Thruway, the former name of the airport. Baer Field Thruway went from Indianapolis Road (now Ardmore Avenue) to Paulding Road at Fairfield Avenue. The section from Bluffton Road to Paulding Road was SR 1, until it was removed in the early 1990s. The western segment of the expressway, from I–69 to Ardmore Avenue, was priced at $10.5 million (equivalent to $19 million in 2024) and was open on July 10, 2001 as Dalman Road. On August 10, 2001, Allen County renamed this section of Dalman Road to Airport Expressway and it was officially open. The city of Fort Wayne changed Baer Field Thruway to Airport Expressway, giving the road one name from I–69 to Paulding Road. On October 17, 2007, the expressway was dedicated to honor State Representative Ben GiaQuinta.

== Major intersections ==
The entire route is in Allen County.

Location	mi	km	Destinations	Notes
Lafayette Township	0.0	0.0	I-69 / US 24 / US 33	Continues west as Lower Huntington Road
Fort Wayne	4.4	7.1	Ardmore Avenue	To Fort Wayne International Airport
Fort Wayne	5.4	8.7	Bluffton Road	Formerly SR 1
Fort Wayne	7.9	12.7	Fairfield Avenue; Paulding Road	Continues east as Paulding Road; to US 27
1.000 mi = 1.609 km; 1.000 km = 0.621 mi
