= Wayne Township, Allen County, Indiana =

Wayne Township
- Township
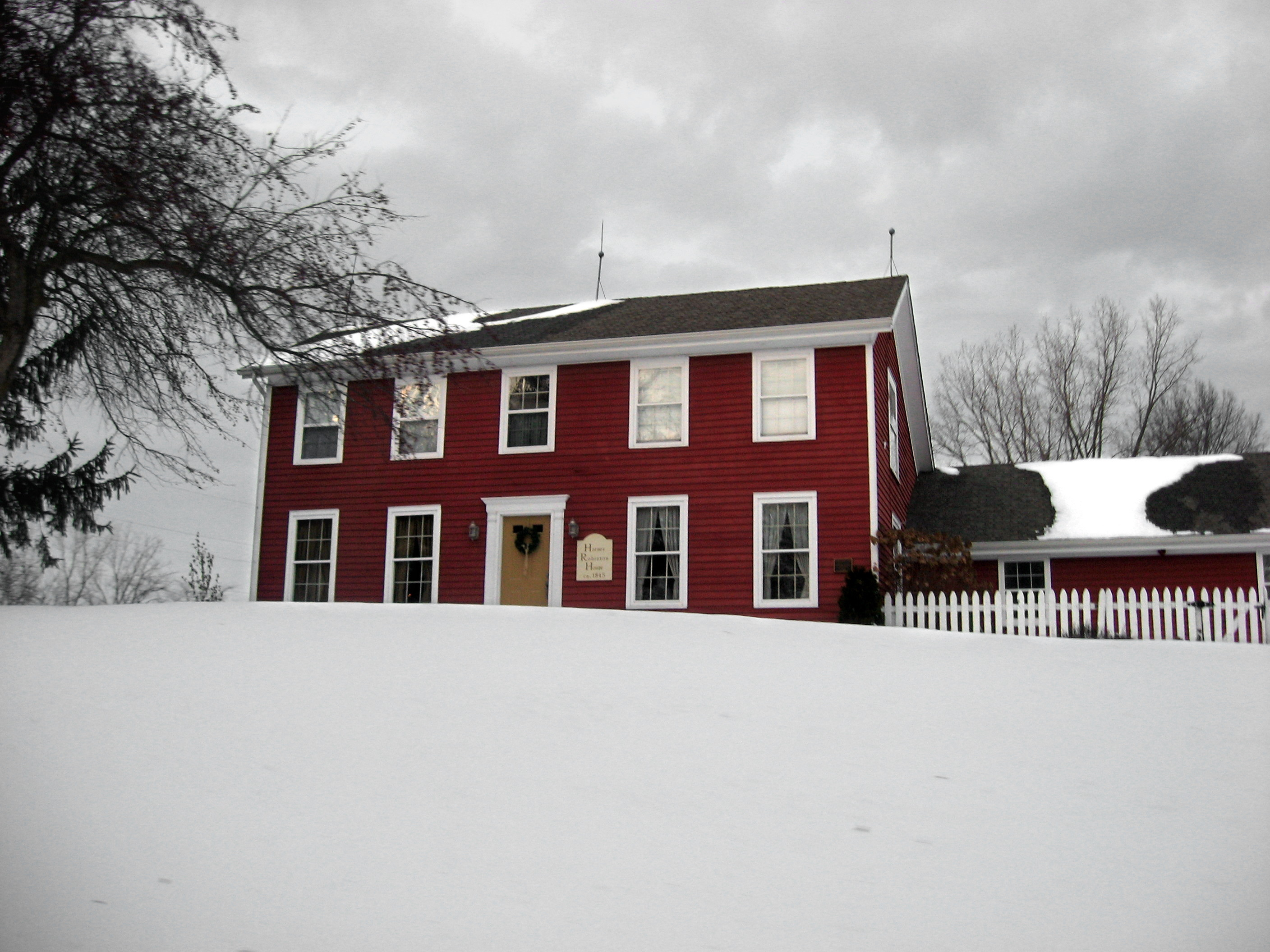
- Horney Robinson House, a historic site in the township

- Seal

- Location of Wayne Township in Allen County, Indiana
- Coordinates: 41°02′58″N 85°09′53″W
- Country: United States
- State: Indiana
- County: Allen

Government
  - Type: Indiana township

Area
  - Total: 42.25 sq mi (109.43 km^{2})
  - Land: 42.13 sq mi (109.11 km^{2})
  - Water: 0.12 sq mi (0.32 km^{2})
- Elevation: 774 ft (236 m)

Population (2020)
  - Total: 107,453
  - Density: 2,464/sq mi (951.3/km^{2})
- FIPS code: 18-81620
- GNIS feature ID: 454027
- Website: waynetownship.org

Wayne Township is one of twenty townships in Allen County, Indiana, United States. As of the 2010 census, its population was 103,803.

== History ==
The Horney Robinson House was listed on the National Register of Historic Places in 1985.

== Geography ==
Wayne Township covers an area of 42.25 square miles (109.43 km^{2}), of which 42.13 square miles (109.11 km^{2}) is land and 0.12 square miles (0.32 km^{2}), or 0.29%, is water.

=== Cities and towns ===
- Fort Wayne (southwest portion)

=== Adjacent townships ===
The township is adjacent to these Indiana townships:

- Aboite (west)
- Adams (east)
- Lafayette (southwest)
- Lake (northwest)
- Marion (southeast)
- Pleasant (south)
- St. Joseph (northeast)
- Washington (north)

=== Major highways ===
- I-69
- US 27
- US 33

=== Cemeteries ===
The township contains three cemeteries: Lindenwood, Prairie Grove, and Saint Johns.
