= Lincoln Highway in Indiana =

Highway in Indiana, United States

Lincoln Highway

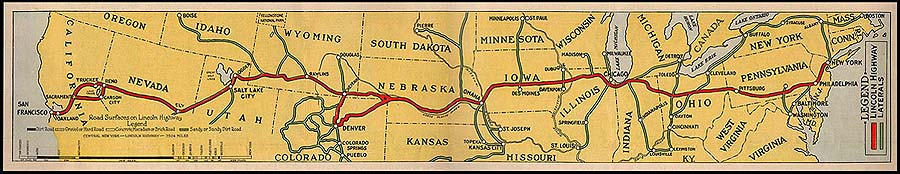

Route information
- Maintained by INDOT
- Existed: 1913–present

Major junctions
- East end: Lincoln Highway at Illinois state line
- West end: Lincoln Highway at Ohio state line

Location
- Country: United States
- State: Indiana

Highway system
- Auto trails; Indiana State Highway System; Interstate; US; State; Scenic
- Historic trails and roads in the United States

The Lincoln Highway had two different routes through Indiana, with the original route passing through South Bend and Elkhart. The Lincoln Highway's current northern alignment is now called Lincoln Way and is a byway.

== Route description ==
=== Illinois to Valparaiso ===
The western end of the Lincoln Highway in Indiana occurs at the Illinois state line, entering the state from Lynwood, Illinois. The highway proceeds east through Dyer along US 30 until entering Schererville. After an intersection with US 41, the highway leaves US 30 and continues east along old SR 330, running one mile north of US 30 into Merrillville. East of Merrillville, the highway rejoins US 30 and continues along the route until leaving again west of Valparaiso.

=== Valparaiso to Fort Wayne ===
Historically, there were two routes from Valparaiso to Fort Wayne. The first route proceeded further north, passing through South Bend, Elkhart, and Goshen. The second route was the most direct route between the cities, passing through Plymouth, Warsaw, and Columbia City.

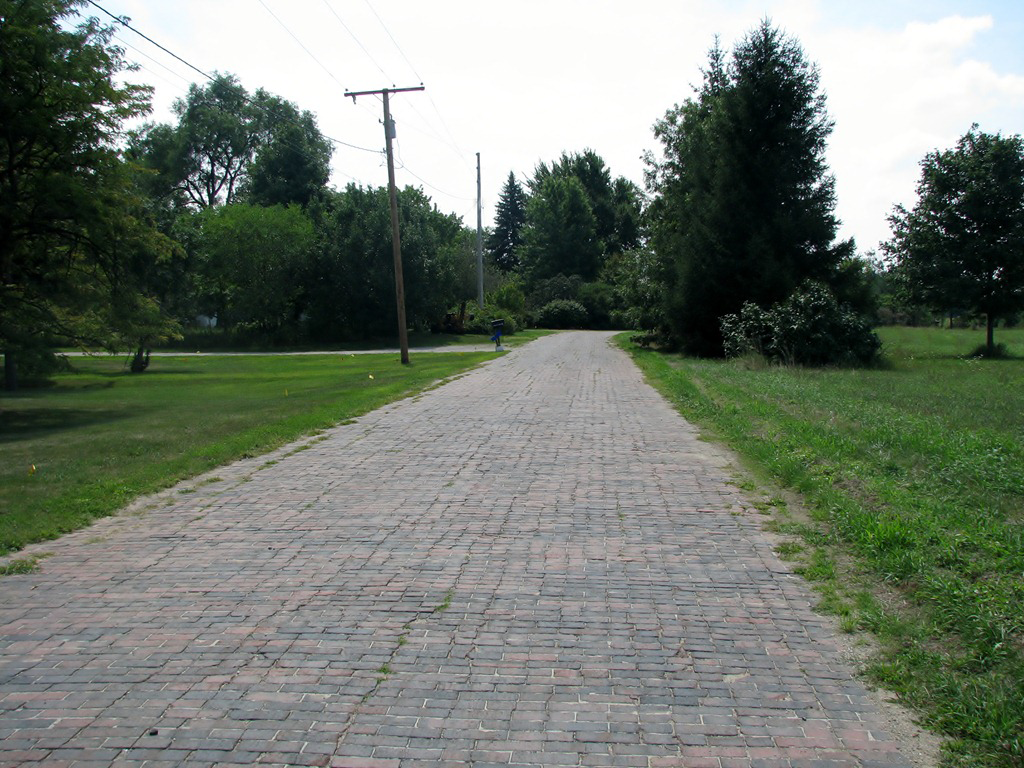
The Old Lincoln Highway on the southside of Ligonier

=== Fort Wayne to Ohio ===
The route from Goshen, used by US 33, and the route from Columbia City, used by US 30, converge west of the interchange with I-469 in Fort Wayne. At this point, the highway continues through downtown Fort Wayne and into New Haven. In this area, it meets up with State Road 930, which reconnects with US 30 after another interchange with I-469. The highway continues along the original alignment for US 30, which the modern US 30 leaves three miles (4.8 km) west of Zulu. The current US 30 follows closely along the south side of the original until they reconvene 1/2 mile (0.80 km) west of the Ohio state line.

Lincoln Highway
Previous state: Illinois	Indiana	Next state: Ohio
