= Indiana State Road 205 =

Highway in Indiana

State Road 205
- Ralph F. Gates Memorial Highway
- SR 205 highlighted in red

Route information
- Maintained by INDOT
- Length: 32.143 mi (51.729 km)
- Existed: 1935–present

Major junctions
- South end: SR 5 near South Whitley
- US 30 in Columbia City; US 33 in Churubusco
- North end: SR 327 near Garrett

Location
- Country: United States
- State: Indiana
- Counties: Allen, Dekalb, Noble, Whitley

Highway system
- Indiana State Highway System; Interstate; US; State; Scenic
← SR 203	→ SR 211

State Road 205 (SR 205) is a State Road in the north-eastern section of the state of Indiana. Running for roughly 32 miles (51 km) in a general northeast-southwest direction, it connects the cities and towns of South Whitley, Columbia City and Garrett via SR 327. SR 205 was originally introduced in the mid-1930s routed between South Whitley and Churubusco. The road was extended northeast to the intersection with SR 327 in the mid to late 1940s.

== Route description ==
SR 205 begins at SR 5 in South Whitley and heads northeast, as a two-lane highway passing through residential. The highway leaves South Whitley and the road curves due east, passing through rural farmland with a few houses. In rural Whitley County the road curves due north, before curving back northeast. The highway enters Columbia City and curves due north. SR 205 is concurrent with Line Street before turning east onto Radio Road. After one block the road turn north onto SR 9, locally known as Main Street. Main Street crosses over the Chicago, Fort Wayne and Eastern Railroad tracks and enters downtown Columbia City. The concurrency with SR 9 passes through commercial properties and the Whitley County Court House. At the northeast of the court house is a traffic light with Van Buren Street and SR 205 turns east onto Van Buren Street. The street passes through a mix of residential and commercial properties, before an intersection at U.S. Route 30 (US 30).

The highway heads northeast from Columbia City as a two-lane highway, passing through rural farmland with some houses. The route enters Churubusco passing through residential properties. SR 205 is concurrent with Whitley Street through Churubusco, as a two-lane city street, passing mainly residential properties. The street has a traffic light at US 33. The road leaves Churubusco, still heading northeast, passing through rural farmland with some house. The road is headed for LaOtto, passing through rural Allen and Noble Counties. The route enters LaOtto, passing through residential properties and has an all-way stop with Old SR 3. As the route begins to leaves LaOtto the road crosses into DeKalb County and has an intersection with SR 3. The road now enters rural DeKalb County, heading northeast. The northern terminus of SR 205 is at an all-way stop with the southern terminus of SR 327. The roadway continues east, toward Auburn, as County Road 56 (CoRd 56). The road has access to Interstate 69, via CoRd 11A.

No part of SR 205 in Indiana is included in the National Highway System (NHS). The NHS is a network of highways that are identified as being most important for the economy, mobility and defense of the nation. The highway is maintained by the Indiana Department of Transportation (INDOT) like all other State Roads in Indiana. The department tracks the traffic volumes along all state highways as a part of its maintenance responsibilities using a metric called average annual daily traffic (AADT). This measurement is a calculation of the traffic level along a segment of roadway for any average day of the year. In 2010, INDOT figured that lowest traffic levels were 2,290 vehicles and 120 commercial vehicles used the highway daily between SR 5 and Whitley CR 400 West. The peak traffic volumes were 9,370 vehicles and 900 commercial vehicles AADT along the section of SR 205 at is concurrent with SR 9, between the Chicago, Fort Wayne and Eastern Railroad tracks and Van Buren Street in Columbia City.

== History ==
SR 205 had its beginning in 1934 when it was authorized from South Whitley to Churubusco. Construction began in 1936 on this section of roadway and was completed one year later. An extension for SR 205 was proposed in 1936 that proposal would have extended SR 205 northeast to US 27. In 1937 that extension was canceled. The route between Churubusco and Ari was commissioned in 1942. The state highway commission constructed the last section of road between Ari and US 27 (now SR 327), south of Garrett, in 1947.

== Major intersections ==
County	Location	mi	km	Destinations	Notes
Whitley	South Whitley	0.000	0.000	SR 5 – South Whitley, Huntington, Larwill	Southern terminus of SR 205
Whitley	Columbia City	9.479	15.255	SR 9 south	Southern end of SR 9 concurrency
Whitley	Columbia City	10.192	16.402	SR 9 north	Northern end of SR 9 concurrency
Whitley	Columbia City	11.494	18.498	US 30 – Warsaw, Fort Wayne	
Whitley	Churubusco	20.610	33.169	US 33	
Allen	No major junctions				
Noble	No major junctions				
Dekalb	LaOtto	28.802	46.352	SR 3 – Fort Wayne, Kendallville	
Dekalb	Keyser–Butler township line	32.143	51.729	SR 327 north / CR 56 east / CR 327 south – Garrett	Northern terminus of SR 205; Southern terminus of SR 327; County Roads 56 and 327 are named as such and are not shielded County Routes
1.000 mi = 1.609 km; 1.000 km = 0.621 mi: Concurrency terminus

== See also ==
- State Road 105
