= Pleasant Township, Allen County, Indiana =

Pleasant Township
- Township
- Location in Allen County, Indiana
- Coordinates: 40°57′35″N 85°10′07″W
- Country: United States
- State: Indiana
- County: Allen

Government
  - Type: Indiana township

Area
  - Total: 35.11 sq mi (90.94 km^{2})
  - Land: 35.11 sq mi (90.94 km^{2})
  - Water: 0 sq mi (0 km^{2}) 0%
- Elevation: 790 ft (240 m)

Population (2020)
  - Total: 2,964
  - Density: 94/sq mi (36.4/km^{2})
- ZIP codes: 46777, 46798, 46809, 46816, 46819
- GNIS feature ID: 0453744

Pleasant Township is one of twenty townships in Allen County, Indiana, United States. As of the 2010 census, its population was 3,312.

== Geography ==
According to the United States Census Bureau, Pleasant Township covers an area of 35.11 square miles (90.9 km^{2}), all land.

=== Cities, towns, villages ===
- Fort Wayne (south edge)

=== Unincorporated towns ===
- Yoder at 40.931159°N 85.176637°W

=== Adjacent townships ===
- Wayne Township (north)
- Adams Township (northeast)
- Marion Township (east)
- Jefferson Township, Wells County (south)
- Union Township, Wells County (southwest)
- Lafayette Township (west)

=== Cemeteries ===
The township contains Brenton Chapel Cemetery.

=== Major highways ===
- I-469 (Ronald Reagan Expressway)
- US 24
- US 33
- SR 1

=== Airports and landing strips ===
- Fort Wayne International Airport

== School districts ==
- Fort Wayne Community Schools

== Political districts ==
- Indiana's 3rd congressional district
- Indiana's 3rd congressional district
- State House District 79
- State House District 82
- State Senate District 16
- State Senate District 19
