= IN-1 =

IN-1, IN 1, or IN1 may refer to:

- Indiana's 1st congressional district
- Indiana State Road 1
