= Aboite =

Aboite may refer to:

- Aboite, Indiana
- Aboite Township, Allen County, Indiana
