= Indiana State Road 427 =

Highway in Indiana

State Road 427
- SR 427 highlighted in red

Route information
- Maintained by INDOT
- Length: 15.564 mi (25.048 km)

Major junctions
- South end: US 6 at Waterloo
- North end: SR 34 at the Ohio state line in Edon, OH

Location
- Country: United States
- State: Indiana
- Counties: DeKalb, Steuben

Highway system
- Indiana State Highway System; Interstate; US; State; Scenic
← US 421	→ SR 441

State Road 427 (SR 427) is a State Road in the north-eastern section of the state of Indiana. Running for about 15.5 miles (24.9 km) in a general northeast–southwest direction, connecting rural portions of Dekalb County. SR 427 was originally introduced in 1932 routed between SR 1, north of Fort Wayne, and Auburn. By the early 1940s SR 427 made its way to the Ohio state line, west of Edon, Ohio. The southern end was moved twice, the first time to US 27 north of Waterloo and the second time to US 6 in Waterloo.

== Route description ==
SR 427 begins in downtown Waterloo at the corner of Union Street (US 6) and Wayne Street. It follows Wayne Street northeast out of Waterloo entering rural Dekalb County. SR 427 has a three-way intersection with old US 27 soon after leaving Waterloo. Northeast of old US 27, SR 427 passes agriculture land before entering Hamilton. In Hamilton the road is concurrent with Wayne Street and passes by Hamilton Community School buildings. The road crosses an Indiana Northeastern Railroad track as it enters Steuben County. Wayne Street has an intersection with Bellefontaine Road where SR 1 joins SR 427 on Wayne Street. The road continues northeast passing by the southeast end of Hamilton Lake. Leaving Hamilton, SR 1 turns north as SR 427 continues northeast passing through rural Steuben County. The road turns east towards the Ohio state line, where it meets Ohio State Route 34.

== History ==
SR 427 had its beginning in 1932 when it was designated from north of Fort Wayne to Auburn, replacing an old alignment of SR 1. The route between US 27, north of Waterloo, and the Ohio state line was authorized in 1934. The state highway commission removed the authorization on the section between US 27 and the town of Hamilton in 1935. In 1937 the section of road heading east from Hamilton officially becomes a state road. In 1941 the road between US 27 and Hamilton becomes a state road. East of the Hamilton two sharp curves were removed between 1956 and 1957. The southern end of SR 427 was moved from SR 1 near Fort Wayne to US 27 north of Waterloo in 1965. In 1968 the southern terminus was extended south to US 6 in Waterloo.

== Major intersections ==
County	Location	mi	km	Destinations	Notes
DeKalb	Waterloo	0.000	0.000	US 6 – Kendallville, Butler; CR 427 south - Auburn, Fort Wayne	Southern terminus of SR 427
Steuben	Hamilton	9.205	14.814	SR 1 south – Butler	Southern end of SR 1 concurrency
Steuben	Hamilton	10.026	16.135	SR 1 north	Northern end of SR 1 concurrency
Steuben	Richland Township	15.564	25.048	SR 34 east – Edon, Bryan	Northern terminus of SR 427
1.000 mi = 1.609 km; 1.000 km = 0.621 mi: Concurrency terminus
