= Yoder, Indiana =

- Unincorporated town
- Location within Indiana Location within the United States
- Coordinates: 40°55′52″N 85°10′36″W
- Country: United States
- State: Indiana
- County: Allen
- Township: Pleasant
- Elevation: 810 ft (250 m)
- Time zone: UTC-5 (Eastern (EST))
  - Summer (DST): UTC-4 (EDT)
- ZIP code: 46798
- Area code: 260
- GNIS feature ID: 446396

Yoder is an unincorporated town in Pleasant Township, Allen County, in the U.S. state of Indiana. Yoder is approximately four miles south of Fort Wayne International Airport.

== History ==
The Yoder post office was established in 1934. Originally known as Sheldon, Yoder was renamed after the railroad.
