= Nine Mile, Indiana =

- Unincorporated community
- Location within Indiana Location within the United States
- Coordinates: 40°58′30″N 85°13′30″W
- Country: United States
- State: Indiana
- County: Allen
- Township: Lafayette
- Elevation: 794 ft (242 m)
- Time zone: UTC-5 (Eastern (EST))
  - Summer (DST): UTC-4 (EDT)
- ZIP code: 46809
- Area code: 260
- GNIS feature ID: 440178

Nine Mile is an unincorporated community in Lafayette Township, Allen County, in the U.S. state of Indiana.

== History ==
A post office was established at Nine Mile in 1855, and remained in operation until it was discontinued in 1904.
