= Ohio State Route 34 =

State highway in Ohio, US

State Route 34

Route information
- Maintained by ODOT
- Length: 32.02 mi (51.53 km)
- Existed: 1923–present

Major junctions
- West end: SR 427 near Edon
- US 127 / SR 15 in Bryan
- East end: US 6 near Archbold

Location
- Country: United States
- State: Ohio
- Counties: Williams, Henry

Highway system
- Ohio State Highway System; Interstate; US; State; Scenic
← SR 33	→ US 35

State Route 34 (SR 34) is an Ohio State Route that runs between Indiana State Road 427, west of Edon and US 6 (US 6) in the US state of Ohio. The 32.02 miles (51.53 km) of SR 34 that lie within the state serve as a minor highway. None of the highway is listed on the National Highway System. Various sections are rural two-lane highway and urban four-lane highway. The highway passes through residential and commercial properties.

The highway was first signed in 1923 and was much longer than it is today, going from the Indiana state line, west of Edon, to SR 101, east of Fremont. Most of the route was replaced by US 6 or SR 412. SR 34 was extended in the late 1950s, when US 6 was rerouted onto a more southerly route near Bryan.

== Route description ==
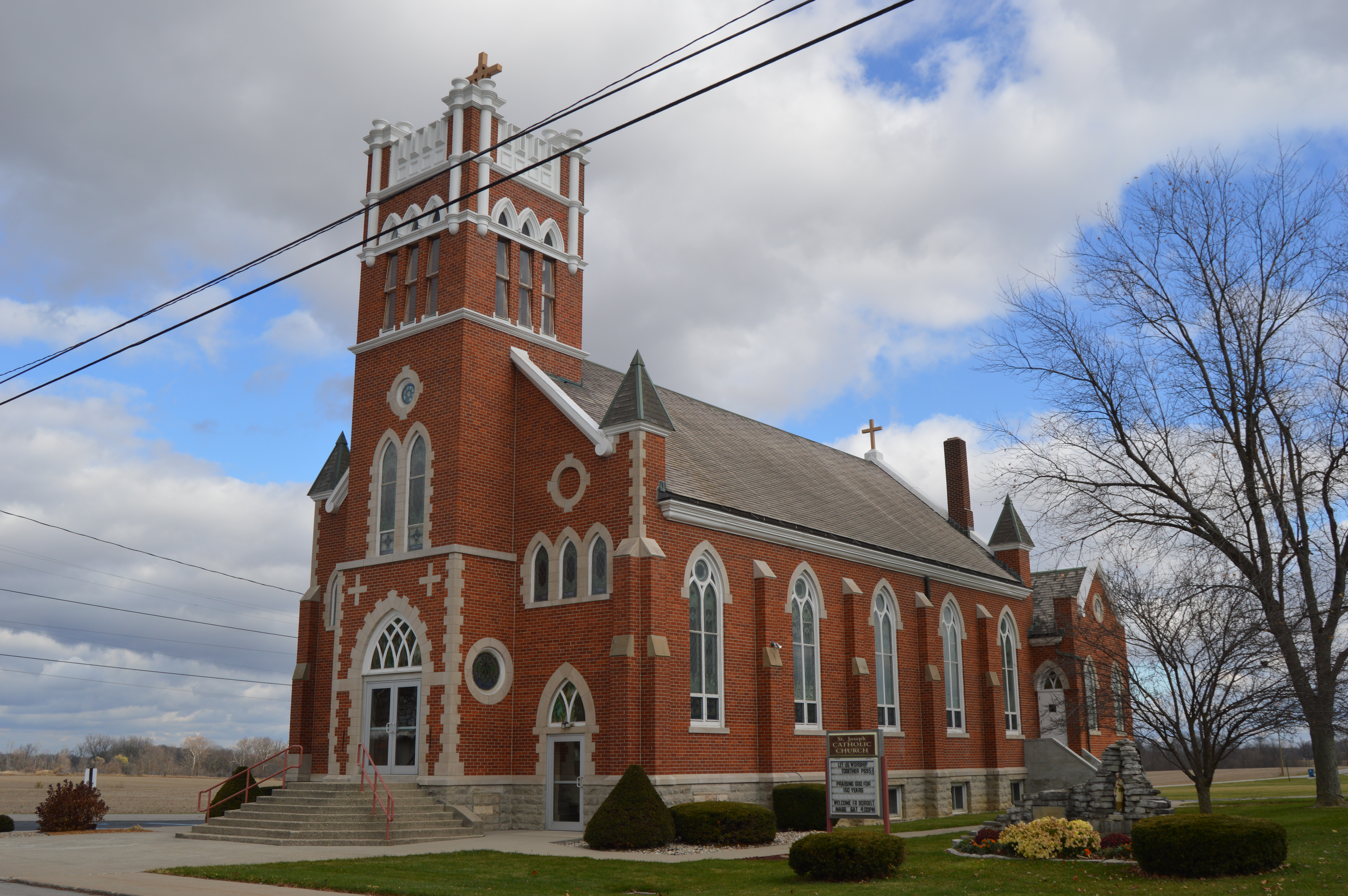
St. Joseph's Church in Blakeslee

SR 34 heads east from the Indiana state line towards Edon, as a two-lane highway passing through farmland with a few houses. The road enters Edon and passes through residential properties. In the center of the town is a four-way stop with SR 49. East of SR 49 the route leaves the town and crosses the Indiana Northeastern Railroad track. The highway has east passing through farmland with a few houses, before making a sharp curve south. The road heads due south towards Blakeslee. In Blakeslee the route passes under a Norfolk Southern Railroad track and the highway turns east-southeast towards Bryan. On the way to Bryan, the highway makes a few curves and crosses over the St. Joseph River, before entering Bryan.

The road enters Bryan heading due south and crossing over more Norfolk Southern Railroad tracks, before turning due east concurrent with High Street. The street heads towards downtown Bryan, as a four-lane undivided highway passing through commercial and residential properties. In downtown, the route has a traffic light with U.S. Route 127 (US 127) and SR 15 at the northeast corner of the Williams County Court House. This intersection is the western end of SR 2 concurrency with SR 2 joining from the south. The highway leaves downtown Bryan heading east through residential and commercial properties. At Union Street, High Street narrows to a two-lane highway and enters a mostly commercial area.

East of Bryan the road heads east, passing through mostly farmland with a few houses and some woodlands. The road becomes very curvy, before turning southeast. In eastern Williams County, the highway crosses over the Tiffin River and has an intersection with SR 191. This intersection is the eastern end of the SR 2 concurrency with SR 2 heading north concurrent with SR 191. The road continues southeast, passing through farmland and entering Henry County. In western Henry County the route has a traffic signal at SR 66. The eastern terminus is at an intersection with US 6, northwest of Ridgeville Corners.

No part of SR 34 is included as a part of the National Highway System (NHS). The NHS is a network of highways that are identified as being most important for the economy, mobility and defense of the nation. The highway is maintained by the Ohio Department of Transportation (ODOT) like all other state roads in the state. The department tracks the traffic volumes along all state highways as a part of its maintenance responsibilities using a metric called average annual daily traffic (AADT). This measurement is a calculation of the traffic level along a segment of roadway for any average day of the year. In 2008, ODOT figured that lowest traffic levels were the 990 vehicles used the highway daily on a section through Blakeslee. The peak traffic volumes were 8,360 vehicles AADT along a section of SR 34 on the west side of Bryan.

== History ==
The route was signed in 1923 from the Indiana state line, west of Edon, east to SR 101. In 1932, US 6 was signed in Ohio and replace most of SR 34 east of Bryan to Fremont, with SR 12, now SR 412, replacing the rest the route to an intersection with SR 101. In 1958, US 6 was moved onto what was formerly SR 384, passing just south of Bryan. With US 6 removed, SR 34 was moved onto the old route of US 6 east of Bryan to its current intersection with US 6. Since 1958 the only work on the route has been maintenance.

== Major intersections ==
County	Location	mi	km	Destinations	Notes
Williams	Florence Township	0.00	0.00	SR 427 south	Western terminus at Indiana state line
Williams	Edon	1.87	3.01	SR 49	
Williams	Center Township	13.31	21.42	SR 576	
Williams	Bryan	16.94	27.26	US 127 / SR 15 SR 2 west	Western end of SR 2 concurrency
Williams	Springfield Township	24.22	38.98	SR 2 east / SR 191	Eastern end of SR 2 concurrency
Henry	Ridgeville Township	30.12	48.47	SR 66	
Henry	Ridgeville Township	32.02	51.53	US 6	Eastern terminus of SR 34
1.000 mi = 1.609 km; 1.000 km = 0.621 mi: Concurrency terminus
