= U.S. Route 30 in Indiana =

Highway in Indiana

U.S. Route 30
- US 30 highlighted in red

Route information
- Maintained by INDOT
- Length: 156.217 mi (251.407 km)
- Existed: November 11, 1926–present

Major junctions
- West end: US 30 at the Illinois state line in Dyer
- US 41 in Schererville; I-65 in Merrillville; US 421 in Wanatah; US 35 near Hanna; US 31 in Plymouth; US 33 near Fort Wayne; I-69 in Fort Wayne; US 27 / SR 3 in Fort Wayne; I-469 near New Haven
- East end: US 30 at the Ohio state line near Monroeville

Location
- Country: United States
- State: Indiana
- Counties: Lake, Porter, LaPorte, Starke, Marshall, Kosciusko, Whitley, Allen

Highway system
- United States Numbered Highway System; List; Special; Divided; Indiana State Highway System; Interstate; US; State; Scenic
← SR 29	→ US 31

U.S. Route 30 (US 30) is a part of the United States Numbered Highway System that runs from Astoria, Oregon, to Atlantic City, New Jersey. In Indiana, the route runs from the Illinois state line at Dyer to the Ohio state line east of Fort Wayne and New Haven. The 156.217 miles (251.407 km) of US 30 that lie within Indiana serve as a major conduit. The entire length of US 30 in Indiana is included in the National Highway System (NHS). The highway includes four-lane rural sections, an urbanized four-lane divided expressway, and several high-traffic six-lane freeway areas. First designated as a U.S. Highway in 1926, US 30 replaced the original State Road 2 (SR 2) and SR 44 designation of the highway which dated back to the formation of the Indiana State Road system. A section of the highway originally served as part of the Lincoln Highway. Realignment and construction projects have expanded the highway to four lanes across the state, and the road is now part of a long stretch of US 30 from New Lenox, Illinois, to Canton, Ohio, where the road has at least four lanes (excluding ramps). There are over 40 traffic signals between Interstate 65 (I-65) at Merrillville and I-69 at Fort Wayne.

== Route description ==
The entire length of US 30 in Indiana is included in the NHS, a network of highways that are identified as being most important for the economy, mobility and defense of the U.S. The highway is maintained by the Indiana Department of Transportation (INDOT), similar to all other U.S. Highways in the state. The department tracks the traffic volumes along all state highways as a part of its maintenance responsibilities using a metric called annual average daily traffic (AADT), calculated along a segment of roadway for any average day of the year. In 2010, INDOT figured that lowest traffic levels were 10,870 vehicles and 4,750 commercial vehicles used the highway daily between US 31 and SR 331. The peak traffic volumes were 69,280 vehicles and 12,660 commercial vehicles AADT along a section of US 30 that is concurrent with I-69, between the Lima Road (exit 311) and Coldwater Road (exit 312) exits in Fort Wayne.

=== Illinois to Valparaiso ===
US 30 enters Dyer from Lynwood, Illinois, along the original alignment of the Lincoln Highway, as a four-lane divided highway. At Moeller Street, the roadway becomes a four-lane highway with a center turn lane before reaching an at-grade intersection with CSX Transportation railroad tracks. Thereafter, the road returns to four-lane divided highway before a traffic light at US 41 in Schererville and passing under Norfolk Southern Railway tracks. After US 41, the original alignment of the Lincoln Highway leaves US 30 and continues along the same route as old SR 330. US 30 begins to curve toward the southeast, still as a four-lane divided highway. The highway has a traffic light at SR 55, heading east as the roadway enters Merrillville, where the route becomes a six-lane divided highway and has an interchange at I-65. At Colorado Street in Merrillville, the road narrows back to a four-lane divided highway.

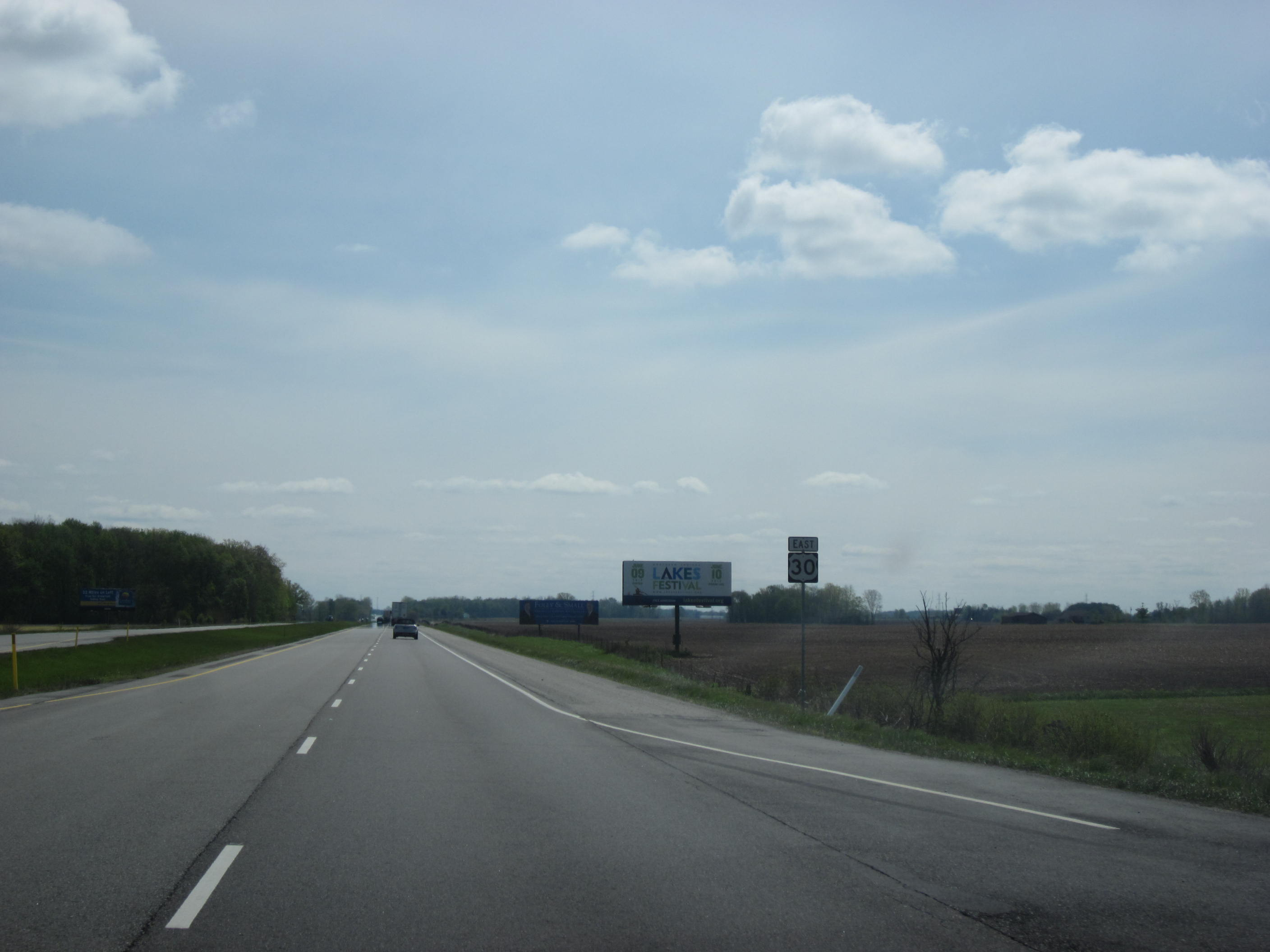
US 30 in Indiana

After a traffic light at the southern terminus of SR 51 in Hobart, the original alignment of the Lincoln Highway rejoins US 30. The highway passes through a mix of farmland and residential properties on the way to Valparaiso, entering the city and passing through commercial properties. The highway has a traffic light at SR 2 at the western end of the concurrency of the two roads. From there, the road crosses railroad tracks, passes south of Valparaiso University, and has a traffic light at the eastern terminus of SR 130. After passing the traffic light at SR 130, the road has a full interchange with SR 49 and the eastern terminus of the SR 2 and US 30 concurrency. Continuing east, the road passes Porter County Regional Airport and proceeds east-southeast from Valparaiso, toward Plymouth.

=== Valparaiso to Allen County ===
After leaving the Valparaiso area, US 30 passes through rural farmland, with an intersection at US 421 northeast of Wanatah and an at-grade railroad crossing with the Chesapeake & Indiana Railroad. East of the railroad tracks is an intersection with SR 39 and a bridge across the Kankakee River. Then the route briefly swings slightly to the north of the old Lincoln Highway alignment to accommodate an interchange at US 35.

US 30 runs along the north side of Plymouth, passing through an interchange with the northern terminus of SR 17 and near Plymouth Municipal Airport. The route curves around the northeast side of the city, having a major interchange with US 31 before heading east-southeast toward Warsaw. At Bourbon, the highway has an interchange with SR 331. The road curves east before entering Warsaw and has an interchange with SR 15, south of Warsaw Municipal Airport. After passing the airport, the road enters a mix of commercial and residential properties. As it bypasses Warsaw, the highway passes through a highly commercial area and has nine traffic signals within four miles (6.4 km), causing frequent traffic backups. One of these is a traffic light at an old alignment of the Lincoln Highway, before US 30 passes north of Winona Lake and heads toward Columbia City.

At Columbia City, the road turns southeast and has traffic lights at SR 109, SR 9, and SR 205, again closely spaced, resulting in frequent congestion. After SR 205, US 30 heads east toward Fort Wayne, paralleling the Chicago, Fort Wayne and Eastern Railroad.

=== Allen County to Ohio ===
==== Western Allen County ====
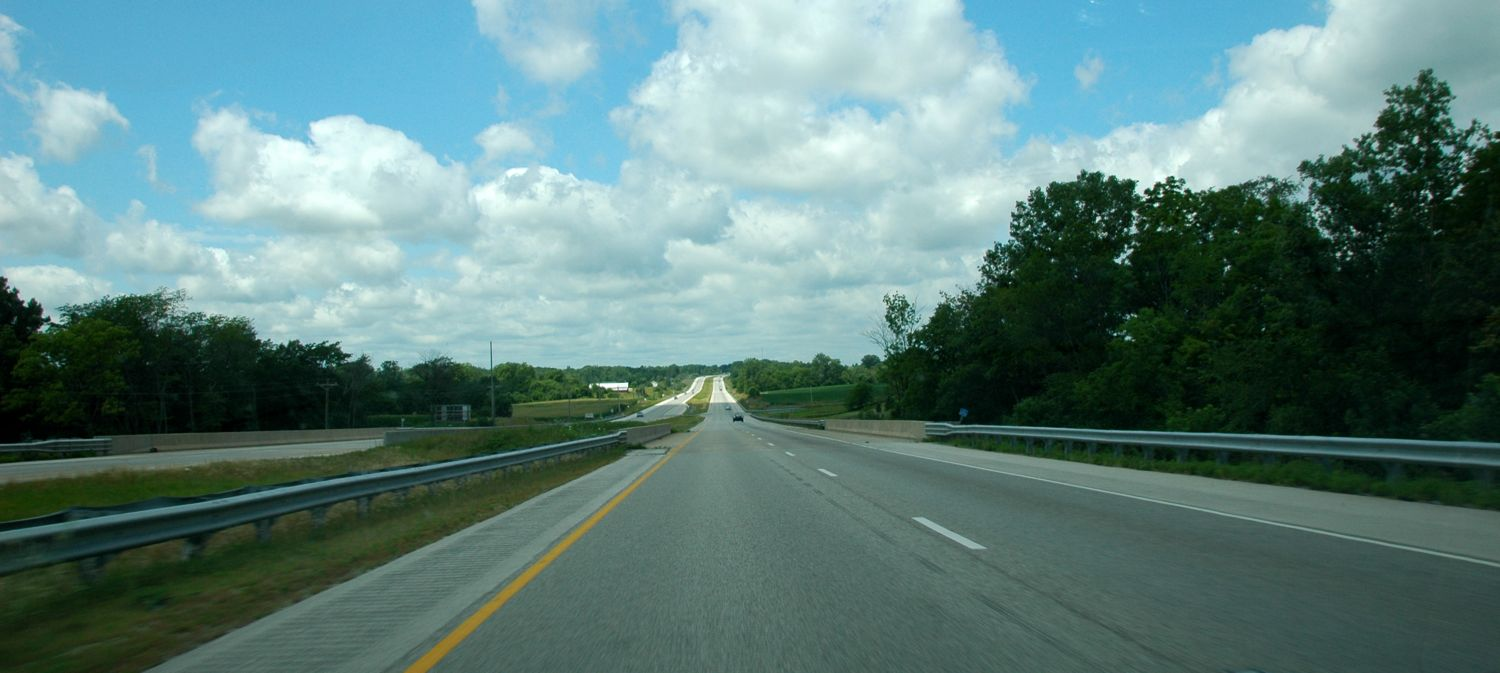
US 30 west of Fort Wayne

US 30 crosses into Allen County at a signalized intersection with Whitley County Road 800 East (signed as County Line Road). After passing a pair of abandoned rest areas, the four-lane divided highway with partial access control then becomes a full access controlled freeway just east of the signalized intersection at Kroemer Road. Immediately thereafter, there is a trumpet interchange with US 33 (Goshen Road), at the western terminus of US 33's concurrency with US 30. From there, the joined routes proceed southeast as a six-lane (counting auxiliary lanes) freeway, passing under Hillegas Road, to a cloverleaf interchange with I-69. At that junction, US 33 joins southbound I-69 (and westbound US 24), while US 30 loops to the north, to run concurrent with both northbound I-69 and eastbound US 24. The through lanes revert to an urban arterial and continue southeast into Fort Wayne as Goshen Road, carrying SR 930 to Coliseum Boulevard.

==== Fort Wayne to New Haven ====
US 30's concurrency with I-69 is a six-lane urban Interstate with interchanges at Lima Road (US 27 and SR 3) and Coldwater Road (formerly SR 327 and, prior to that, US 27). At the interchange of I-69 and I-469, US 30 heads east concurrent with I-469 to loop around the north and east sides of Fort Wayne, heading toward New Haven. I-469 is a four-lane Interstate passing through a mix of farmland and suburban residential properties. Initially proceeding east, the interstate crosses the St. Joseph River and has an interchange at Maplecrest Road before turning southeast, then south around the northeast side of Fort Wayne to subsequent interchanges with SR 37 followed by US 24. After the US 24 interchange, the Interstate crosses the Maumee River and Norfolk Southern Railway tracks before US 30 departs I-469 east of downtown New Haven at the eastern terminus of SR 930.

==== Eastern Allen County ====
After I-469, US 30 heads southeast away from New Haven, passing through rural farmland as a four-lane divided highway with partial access control. The route bypasses the tiny hamlets of Zulu, Tillman, and Townley with an intersection at SR 101 just to the north of the latter. US 30 completes its journey across the Hoosier State and enters Ohio (at State Line Road), continuing southeast toward Van Wert.

== History ==
Lincoln Highway shield

The Lincoln Highway was planned in 1913 to run west to east across Indiana, including to South Bend and Fort Wayne. In 1915, the highway opened, passed through downtown Fort Wayne on its route through Indiana, and was assigned the designation of Main Market route number 2 in 1917. Further designations saw the route become SR 2 from the Illinois state line to Valparaiso, SR 44 Valparaiso to Fort Wayne, and SR 2 from Fort Wayne to the Ohio state line. In the early 1920s, the Lincoln Highway was moved south between Valparaiso and Fort Wayne, to what is now known mostly as Old US 30, passing through Plymouth and Warsaw. A section of US 30 in Dyer known as the "ideal section" of the Lincoln Highway was opened in 1923 and rebuilt in the 1990s. In 1924, the sections of the road that were part of the original Lincoln Highway was paved, followed by the paving of the rest of US 30, which was commissioned in 1926. In 1927, a small realignment between Hanna and SR 29 (current US 35) took place.

Prior to the construction of Coliseum Boulevard (a "circumurban" highway around Fort Wayne), US 30 followed a route through the city. Entering from the west, the route followed Goshen Avenue southeast to an intersection with Sherman Boulevard, where it turned to the south. After crossing the St. Marys River, the route entered downtown Fort Wayne on Van Buren Street, before quickly departing to the east on Superior Street. The route then turned south onto Fairfield Avenue, continuing to the one-way system of Washington Boulevard (westbound) and Jefferson Boulevard (eastbound). East of downtown, the route followed the present-day alignment of SR 930 through New Haven and beyond. After the construction of the circumurban bypass, this route was kept signed as a "city" route.

In 1953, US 30 in Fort Wayne was rerouted to a "circumurban" highway that was built along portions of the alignments of Beuter Road and California Road, to bypass most of Fort Wayne. This route, later renamed Coliseum Boulevard since it passes directly by Allen County War Memorial Coliseum, quickly became a congested urban highway in its own right as it was not built to freeway standards. In 1998, US 30 in Fort Wayne was rerouted onto I-69 and I-469, becoming a true controlled access freeway bypass for most of Fort Wayne and New Haven on the north and east side of the two cities. The old Coliseum Boulevard routing was assigned the SR 930 designation as a result, when local officials refused to let INDOT fully decommission the route and turn responsibility for it over to the cities or the county.

== Future ==
INDOT has plans to convert US 30 to a freeway from Valparaiso to the Ohio state line.

== Major intersections ==
County	Location	mi	km	Exit	Destinations	Notes
Lake	Dyer	0.000	0.000		US 30 west / Lincoln Highway – Joliet	Illinois state line
Lake	Schererville	2.864	4.609		US 41 (South Indianapolis Boulevard) – St. John, Hammond, Highland	
Lake	Schererville	3.262	5.250		Lincoln Highway (Joliet Street)	
Lake	Merrillville	8.586	13.818		SR 55 (Taft Street) – Crown Point	
Lake	Merrillville	10.095	16.246		SR 53 (Broadway)	
Lake	Merrillville	10.430– 10.821	16.785– 17.415		I-65 – Indianapolis, Chicago	Exit 253 on I-65
Lake	Hobart	14.114	22.714		SR 51 north / Grand Boulevard – Hobart	Southern terminus of SR 51
Lake	Hobart	16.778	27.002		Lincoln Highway (Joliet Road)	
Porter	Shorewood Forest	20.285	32.646		Lincoln Highway (Joliet Road)	
Porter	Valparaiso	24.348	39.184		SR 2 west	Western end of SR 2 concurrency
Porter	Valparaiso	26.507	42.659		SR 2 east / SR 49 – Valparaiso, Kouts, Chesterton	Eastern end of SR 2 concurrency; interchange
LaPorte	Wanatah	33.753	54.320		US 421 – Michigan City, La Crosse	
LaPorte	Hanna	42.260	68.011		SR 39 – North Judson, LaPorte	
Starke	Davis Township	48.360	77.828		US 35 – Knox, LaPorte	interchange
Starke	Grovertown	54.558	87.803		SR 23 – Walkerton, Koontz Lake	
Marshall	Plymouth	64.797	104.281		SR 17 south – Plymouth	Northern terminus of SR 17; interchange
Marshall	Plymouth	67.070	107.939		US 31 – South Bend, Indianapolis	Exit 225 on US 31; interchange
Marshall	Bourbon	75.831	122.038		SR 331 – Bremen, Bourbon, Mishawaka	interchange
Kosciusko	Etna Green	80.075	128.868		SR 19	
Kosciusko	Warsaw	90.500	145.646		SR 15 – Warsaw, Goshen	interchange
Kosciusko	Pierceton	99.626	160.333		SR 13 – North Webster, Syracuse, North Manchester, Manchester University	
Whitley	Larwill	104.111	167.550		SR 5 – Ligonier, South Whitley, Huntington	
Whitley	Columbia City	111.258	179.052		SR 109 north / Line Street – Wolf Lake	
Whitley	Columbia City	111.580	179.571		SR 9 – Albion, Huntington, Columbia City	
Whitley	Columbia City	112.857	181.626		SR 205 – Columbia City, Churubusco, South Whitley	
Allen	Fort Wayne	127.588	205.333		US 33 north / Lincoln Highway – Elkhart, Churubusco	Western end of US 33 concurrency
Allen	Fort Wayne	127.971– 128.212	205.949– 206.337	309	I-69 south / US 24 west / US 33 south – Indianapolis SR 930 east (Goshen Road) / Lincoln Highway – Fort Wayne	Southern end of I-69 concurrency; western end of US 24 concurrency; eastern end of US 33 concurrency; western end of SR 930
Allen	Fort Wayne	129.993	209.203	311	US 27 south / SR 3 north / Lima Road – Fort Wayne, Kendallville	Northern terminus of US 27; southern terminus of SR 3
Allen	Fort Wayne	131.295	211.299	312	Coldwater Road	Serves IPFW, Ivy Tech, Allen County War Memorial Coliseum, and Glenbrook Square
Allen	Fort Wayne	134.003	215.657	315; 31	I-69 north – Lansing MI. I-469 east	Northern end of I-69 concurrency; western end of I-469 concurrency; exit 315 on I-69 and exit 31 on I-469
Allen	Fort Wayne	136.258	219.286	29	Maplecrest Road	
Allen	Fort Wayne	140.250	225.710	25	SR 37 north / Maysville Road – Fort Wayne, Hicksville	Southern terminus of SR 37
Allen	New Haven	143.951	231.667	21	US 24 east / Rose Avenue	Eastern end of US 24 concurrency
Allen	New Haven	145.404	234.005	19	I-469 south / SR 930 west / Lincoln Highway – New Haven, Fort Wayne	Southern end of I-469 concurrency; eastern terminus of SR 930
Allen	Jefferson Township	147.233	236.949		Lincoln Highway	
Allen	Monroe Township	152.835	245.964		SR 101 – Townley, Woodburn, Monroeville	
Allen	Monroe Township	155.907	250.908		Lincoln Highway	
Allen	Monroe Township	156.217	251.407		US 30 east / Lincoln Highway – Van Wert, Upper Sandusky, Mansfield	Ohio state line
1.000 mi = 1.609 km; 1.000 km = 0.621 mi: Concurrency terminus

== See also ==
U.S. Route 30
Previous state: Illinois	Indiana	Next state: Ohio
