= Lafayette Township, Allen County, Indiana =

Lafayette Township
- Township
- Location in Allen County, Indiana
- Coordinates: 40°57′45″N 85°17′08″W
- Country: United States
- State: Indiana
- County: Allen

Government
  - Type: Indiana township

Area
  - Total: 34.61 sq mi (89.64 km^{2})
  - Land: 34.55 sq mi (89.48 km^{2})
  - Water: 0.062 sq mi (0.16 km^{2}) 0.18%
- Elevation: 830 ft (253 m)

Population (2020)
  - Total: 4,247
  - Density: 97/sq mi (37.5/km^{2})
- ZIP codes: 46777, 46783, 46798, 46799, 46809, 46814
- GNIS feature ID: 0453530

Lafayette Township is one of twenty townships in Allen County, Indiana, United States. As of the 2010 census, its population was 3,354.

== Geography ==
According to the United States Census Bureau, Lafayette Township covers an area of 34.61 square miles (89.64 km^{2}); of this, 34.55 square miles (89.48 km^{2}) is land and 0.062 square miles (0.16 km^{2}), or 0.18 percent, is water.

=== Cities, towns, villages ===
- Zanesville (north half)

=== Unincorporated towns ===
- Aboite at 41.000881°N 85.318029°W
- Nine Mile at 40.975048°N 85.224972°W

(This list is based on USGS data and may include former settlements.)

=== Adjacent townships ===
- Aboite Township (north)
- Wayne Township (northeast)
- Pleasant Township (east)
- Jefferson Township, Wells County (southeast)
- Union Township, Wells County (south)
- Union Township, Huntington County (southwest)
- Jackson Township, Huntington County (west)

=== Cemeteries ===
The township contains Fogwell Cemetery.

=== Major highways ===
- I-69
- I-469 (Ronald Reagan Expressway)
- US 24
- US 33

=== Airports and landing strips ===
- Fort Wayne International Airport
- Wilcox Airstrip

=== Rivers ===
- Little Wabash River

== School districts ==
- Metropolitan School District of Southwest Allen County

== Political districts ==
- Indiana's 3rd congressional district
- State House District 50
- State House District 82
- State Senate District 16
- State Senate District 17
- State Senate District 19
