= Aboite, Indiana =

- Unincorporated community
- Location within Indiana Location within the United States
- Coordinates: 41°0′0″N 85°19′5″W
- Country: United States
- State: Indiana
- County: Allen
- Township: Lafayette
- Elevation: 758 ft (231 m)
- Time zone: UTC-5 (Eastern (EST))
  - Summer (DST): UTC-4 (EDT)
- ZIP code: 46804
- Area code: 260
- GNIS feature ID: 429991

Aboite is an unincorporated community in Lafayette Township, Allen County, Indiana, United States.

== History ==
Aboite was originally settled as a train stop at the intersection of the Toledo, Wabash & Western Railway with Aboite Road. The community's name is derived from the French word for "minnow". A post office was established at Aboite in 1833, and remained in operation until it was discontinued in 1921.

In 1890, the population was estimated as around 50 residents. In 1900, the population was 63.

By 1920, the population was 68. The population was 50 in 1940.

== See also ==
- Ellisville, Indiana
