= Zulu, Indiana =

- Unincorporated community
- Location within Indiana Location within the United States
- Coordinates: 41°02′12.6″N 84°54′03.0″W
- Country: United States
- State: Indiana
- County: Allen
- Township: Jefferson
- Elevation: 774 ft (236 m)
- Time zone: UTC-5 (Eastern (EST))
  - Summer (DST): UTC-4 (EDT)
- ZIP code: 46773
- Area code: 260
- GNIS feature ID: 446497

Zulu is an unincorporated town in Jefferson Township, Allen County, in the U.S. state of Indiana.

== History ==
The name Zulu was selected at random from an encyclopedia. A post office was established at Zulu in 1880, and remained in operation until 1904.
