= Indiana State Road 930 =

Highway in Indiana

State Road 930
- SR 930 highlighted in red

Route information
- Maintained by INDOT
- Length: 12.848 mi (20.677 km)
- Existed: 1998–present

Major junctions
- West end: I-69 / US 24 / US 30 / US 33 in Fort Wayne
- US 27 in Fort Wayne
- East end: I-469 / US 30 in New Haven

Location
- Country: United States
- State: Indiana

Highway system
- Indiana State Highway System; Interstate; US; State; Scenic
← SR 912	→ SR 931

State Road 930 (SR 930) is an Indiana State Road that runs between Fort Wayne and New Haven in the US state of Indiana. The 12.97 miles (20.87 km) of SR 930 serve as a connection with U.S. Route 30 (US 30) through these two cities between the beginning of the concurrency with Interstate 69 (I-69) in Fort Wayne and the end of its concurrency with I-469 in New Haven. Various sections are urban two-lane highway, urbanized four-lane divided highway, and urbanized six-lane divided highway. The highway passes through industrial and commercial properties. SR 930 was designated in 1998, and replaced segments of US 30 in Fort Wayne and New Haven that were formerly part of the Lincoln Highway in the 1920s, as well as Coliseum Boulevard, which was designated as part of US 30 in the 1950s.

== Route description ==
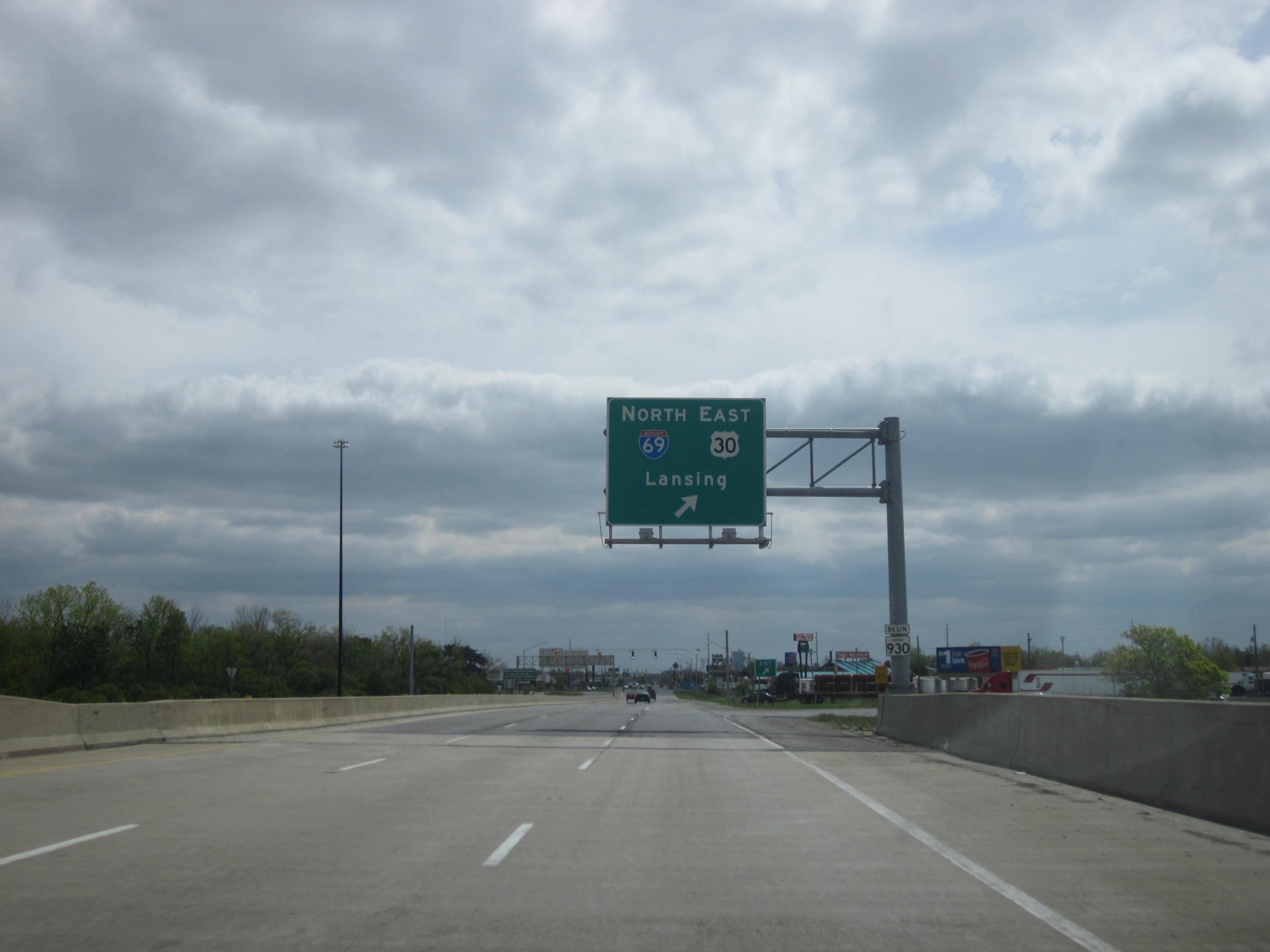
SR 930 at the I-69 and US 30 interchange

SR 930's western terminus is at an interchange with I-69, US 24, US 30, and US 33. The highway heads southeast on Goshen Road from the interchange towards Coliseum Boulevard as a six-lane divided highway, passing between commercial properties and woodland. The route turns east onto Coliseum Boulevard as a four-lane undivided road with a center turn lane, passing through commercial and industrial properties. The highway has an at-grade railroad crossing with a single-track rail line. After the railroad crossing, the road widens to a six-lane undivided highway at Sherman Boulevard. The route then has an intersection with US 27, and continues passing through commercial properties.

After US 27, the highway passes by Glenbrook Square and beings to turns southeast at Clinton Street. After a stoplight at Parnell Avenue, the road passes by the Allen County War Memorial Coliseum. Then, the road crosses the St. Joseph River and has a traffic light at North Anthony Boulevard. The highway passes between the Purdue University Fort Wayne (PFW) and Ivy Tech Community College campuses, before coming to a traffic light at Crescent Avenue. East of Crescent Avenue, the road becomes a four-lane divided highway and enters mainly residential areas of town until the route begins to curve due south toward an intersection with Vance Avenue. After this turn, the route becomes a six-lane divided highway and passes through mainly commercial properties with some woodland.

The highway has a traffic light at East State Boulevard and Lake Avenue, before narrowing back to a four-lane divided highway. The road crosses over the Maumee River and the Norfolk Southern Railroad tracks, in a mainly wooded area with some industrial properties. After the railroad tracks, SR 930 leaves Coliseum Boulevard at an interchange with Washington Boulevard. The highway heads east-southeast toward New Haven as a four-lane divided highway, passing through commercial properties. The road crosses over another set of Norfolk Southern railroad tracks and turns due east at New Haven Avenue.

After New Haven Avenue, the highway enters the commercial area of New Haven as a four-lane highway with a center turn lane. The route has a traffic light at Lincoln Highway, and SR 930 heads southeast, bypassing downtown New Haven. Southeast of Lincoln Highway, SR 930 is a two-lane highway passing through a mix of commercial and residential properties. The road becomes a four-lane divided highway at Minnich Road, just west of the I-469. The eastern terminus of SR 930 is at I-469, where US 30's concurrency with I-469 ends, and US 30 continues east along the same road where SR 930 ends.

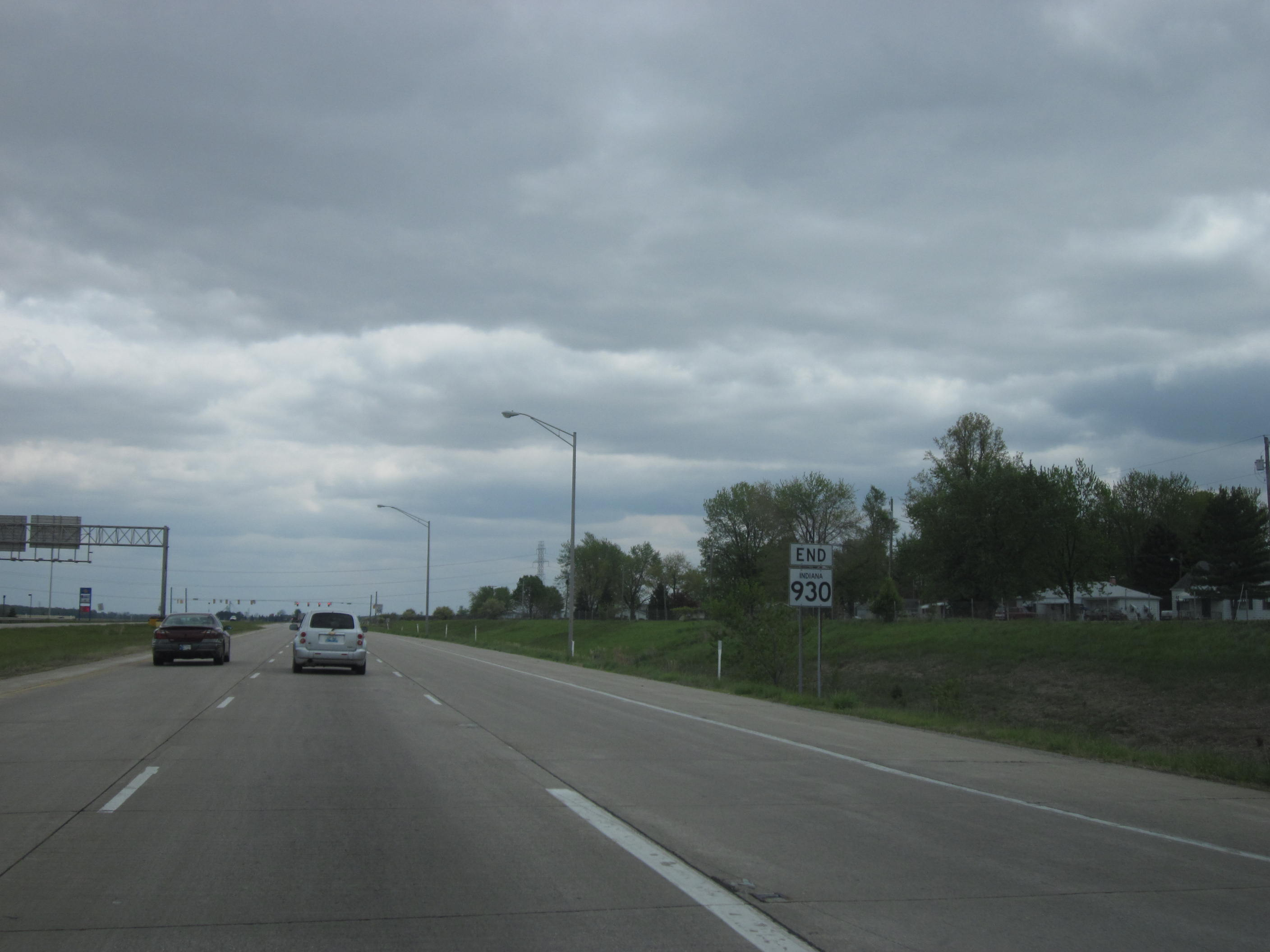
SR 930 at the I-469 and US 30 interchange

As of 2020, no part of SR 930 is included as a part of the NHS. SR 930 is maintained by the Indiana Department of Transportation (INDOT), like all other state roads in the state. The department tracks the traffic volumes along all state highways as a part of its maintenance responsibilities using a metric called average annual daily traffic (AADT), a calculation of the traffic level along a segment of roadway for any average day of the year. In 2024, the lowest traffic levels were 11,078 total vehicles between Green Road and Minnich Road in New Haven. The peak traffic volumes were 47,671 total vehicles between Parnell Avenue and Anthony Boulevard in Fort Wayne.

== History ==
In 1913, the Lincoln Highway was planned to pass through some of the areas that later became SR 930. These sections include the segment of Goshen Road in Fort Wayne now used by SR 930, and the section of what is now SR 930 between Maumee Road and Lincoln Highway in New Haven. The Lincoln Highway was opened in 1915 and passed through downtown Fort Wayne and New Haven. In 1917, Main Market route number 2 was the given number to the Lincoln Highway in Indiana. In 1926, US 30 was commissioned to follow SR 2 through Fort Wayne and New Haven. In addition, US 24 was concurrent with US 30 from Washington Boulevard in Fort Wayne and Lincoln Highway in New Haven. In 1948, sections of what would become Coliseum Boulevard were built between US 30/33 (Goshen Road) and Indiana SR 1/427 (Clinton Street) and certified as Indiana SR 324. The rest of Coliseum Boulevard was completed by 1956. In 1957, Coliseum Boulevard received the US 30 designation.

In 1998, US 24 and US 30 were rerouted onto I-69 and I-469 and the route that became SR 930, including Coliseum Boulevard, was to be decommissioned. INDOT tried to give the route to local control, but Allen County, the city of Fort Wayne, and the City of New Haven did not have funds for the roadway. This led INDOT to commission the route as SR 930.

== Major intersections ==
The entire highway is in Allen County.

Location	mi	km	Destinations	Notes
Fort Wayne	0.000	0.000	I-69 / US 24 / US 30 / US 33 / Lincoln Highway – Indianapolis, Columbia City, Goshen, Elkhart, Lansing	Western terminus of SR 930
Fort Wayne	0.418	0.673	Lincoln Highway (Goshen Avenue)	
Fort Wayne	2.097	3.375	US 27 / Lima Road	
Fort Wayne	7.595	12.223	Lincoln Highway (Washington Boulevard) / Coliseum Boulevard	interchange
New Haven	10.210	16.431	Lincoln Highway	
New Haven	11.688	18.810	Lincoln Highway (Green Road)	
New Haven	12.848	20.677	I-469 / US 30 / Lincoln Highway – Van Wert, Defiance	Eastern terminus of SR 930
1.000 mi = 1.609 km; 1.000 km = 0.621 mi
