= Interstate 469 =

Highway in Indiana

Interstate 469
- Ronald Reagan Expressway
- I-469 highlighted in red

Route information
- Auxiliary route of I-69
- Maintained by INDOT
- Length: 30.83 mi (49.62 km)
- Existed: 1989–present
- History: Completed in 1995
- NHS: Entire route

Major junctions
- Clockwise end: I-69 / US 33 at Lafayette Center Road in rural Allen County
- US 27 / US 33 near Fort Wayne; US 30 in New Haven; US 24 in New Haven
- Counterclockwise end: I-69 / US 24 / US 30 in Fort Wayne

Location
- Country: United States
- State: Indiana
- Counties: Allen

Highway system
- Interstate Highway System; Main; Auxiliary; Suffixed; Business; Future; Indiana State Highway System; Interstate; US; State; Scenic
← I-465	→ SR 520

Interstate 469 (I-469) is an Interstate Highway in northeastern Indiana. It is an auxiliary route of parent I-69 that also carries portions of US Highway 24 (US 24), US 30, and US 33 around the urban parts of Fort Wayne. It is 30.83 miles (49.62 km) in length. The Interstate was originally conceived as a bypass for US 24 around the south and east ends of Fort Wayne. Due to heavy traffic on US 30 through the city, support was gained to connect the bypass to I-69 on the city's north end. I-469 was given the name Ronald Reagan Expressway in 2005.

I-469 was the most expensive civic project in the history of Allen County, costing over $207 million (equivalent to $388 million in 2024). As a bypass route, I-469 has been ineffective at helping with north–south traffic along I-69. However, the route has served effectively as an east–west bypass around the city, removing heavy truck traffic from passing through Fort Wayne.

== Route description ==
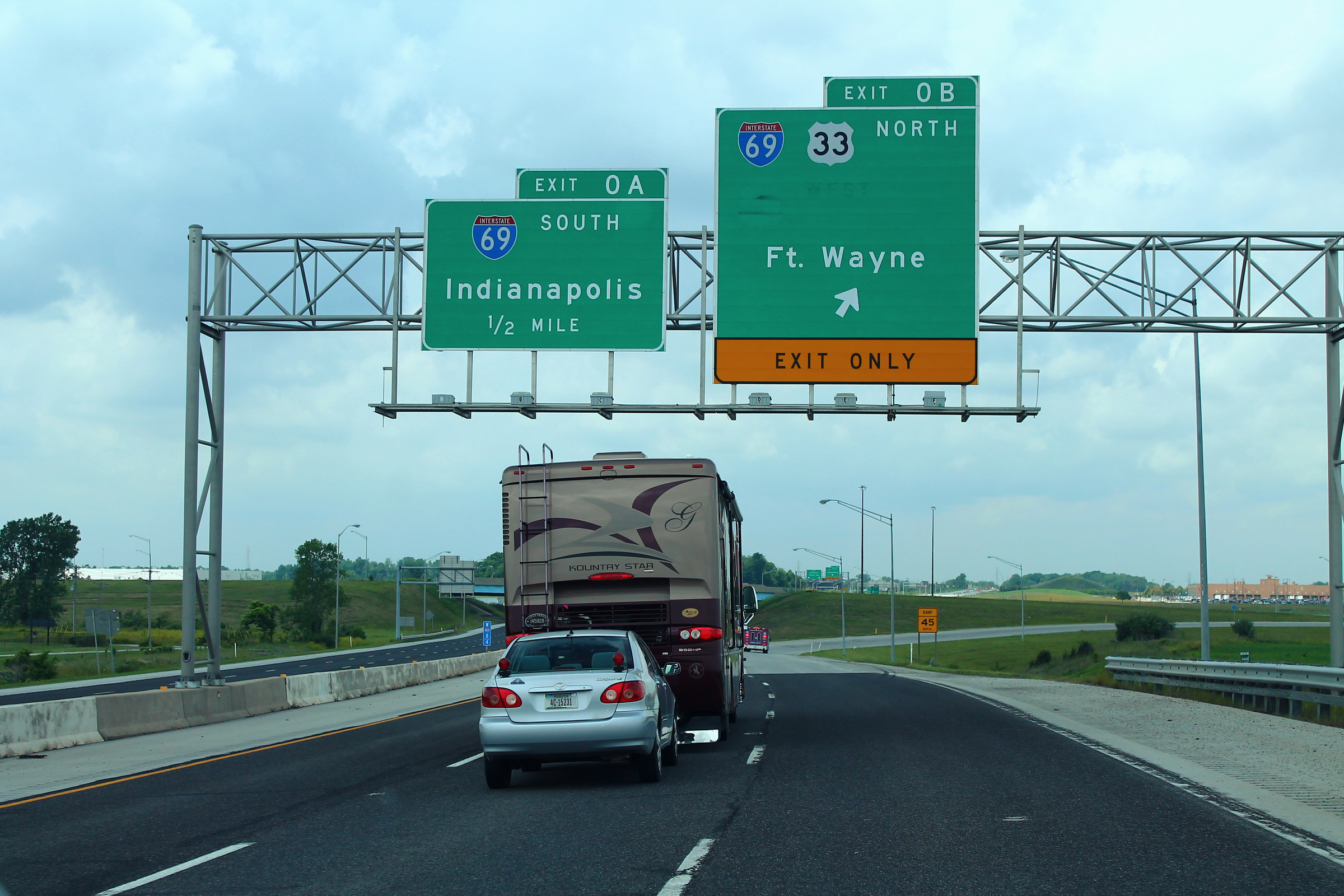
I-469 at its western terminus with I-69

I-469 begins at I-69 exit 296 and Lafayette Center Road in southwestern Allen County. The freeway heads east as a four-lane freeway, running concurrently with US 33. The highway begins to turn southeast, passing through farmland. The route has a diamond interchange at Lafayette Center Road East and at Indianapolis Road, before turning due east and passing just south of Fort Wayne International Airport. The next interchange is at the northern terminus of the southern section of State Road 1 (SR 1) and serves the airport via Bluffton Road. After curving northeasterly, I-469 has an interchange with Winchester Road and another with US 27. At the interchange with US 27, US 33 leaves I-469 heading south concurrently with US 27.

The freeway then curves northeasterly, with interchanges at Marion Center Road and Tillman Road. Then, I-469 passes southeast of New Haven, with an interchange at Minnich Road. After the Minnich Road exit, the road begins to curve due north along the east side of New Haven. The freeway has an interchange with US 30/SR 930 at SR 930's eastern terminus; US 30 begins running concurrently with I-469. After the interchange at US 30 is a bridge over Norfolk Southern railroad tracks and an interchange with US 24. This is the eastern end of the concurrency with US 24.

I-469 proceeds north, concurrent with both US 24 and US 30. The freeway crosses the Maumee River and begins to curve to the northwest, entering commercial areas. The next interchange is with the southern terminus of the northern section of SR 37, after which the route enters residential areas with a small amount of farmland. The highway then curves further west to an interchange at Maplecrest Road. At I-469's northern terminus, it has an interchange with I-69 and an exit-only ramp to Auburn Road; US 24 and US 30 continue to the south along I-69.

=== Traffic flow ===
I-469 is maintained by the Indiana Department of Transportation (INDOT). As of 2017, I-469's traffic count was 46,161 vehicles per day, on average between Maplecrest Road and I-469's northern terminus, 34,651 near its interchange with US 30, 14,821 near its interchange with Marion Center Road, and 22,142 between the highway's southern terminus and its interchange with Lafayette Center Road East. By comparison, in 2017, I-69 saw over 60,000 vehicles per day in a majority of sections between the termini of I-469.

A 2007 traffic count along I-469 found that only one section of the highway, between Maplecrest Road and I-469's northern terminus, saw traffic numbers close to anywhere along I-69's route around the city, while other sections are much more lightly traveled. John Stafford, who formerly worked for Allen County Plan Commission during planning for I-469, stated in 2008 that the highway was relatively new and would eventually spur growth. Since its construction, I-469 has been ineffective as a north–south bypass around Fort Wayne, in part because its length is 12 miles (19 km) longer than I-69's route around the city. However, officials have stated that heavy truck traffic along Coliseum Boulevard (currently SR 930) has almost entirely disappeared, and some have stated that I-469 functions better as an east–west bypass around Fort Wayne.

== History ==
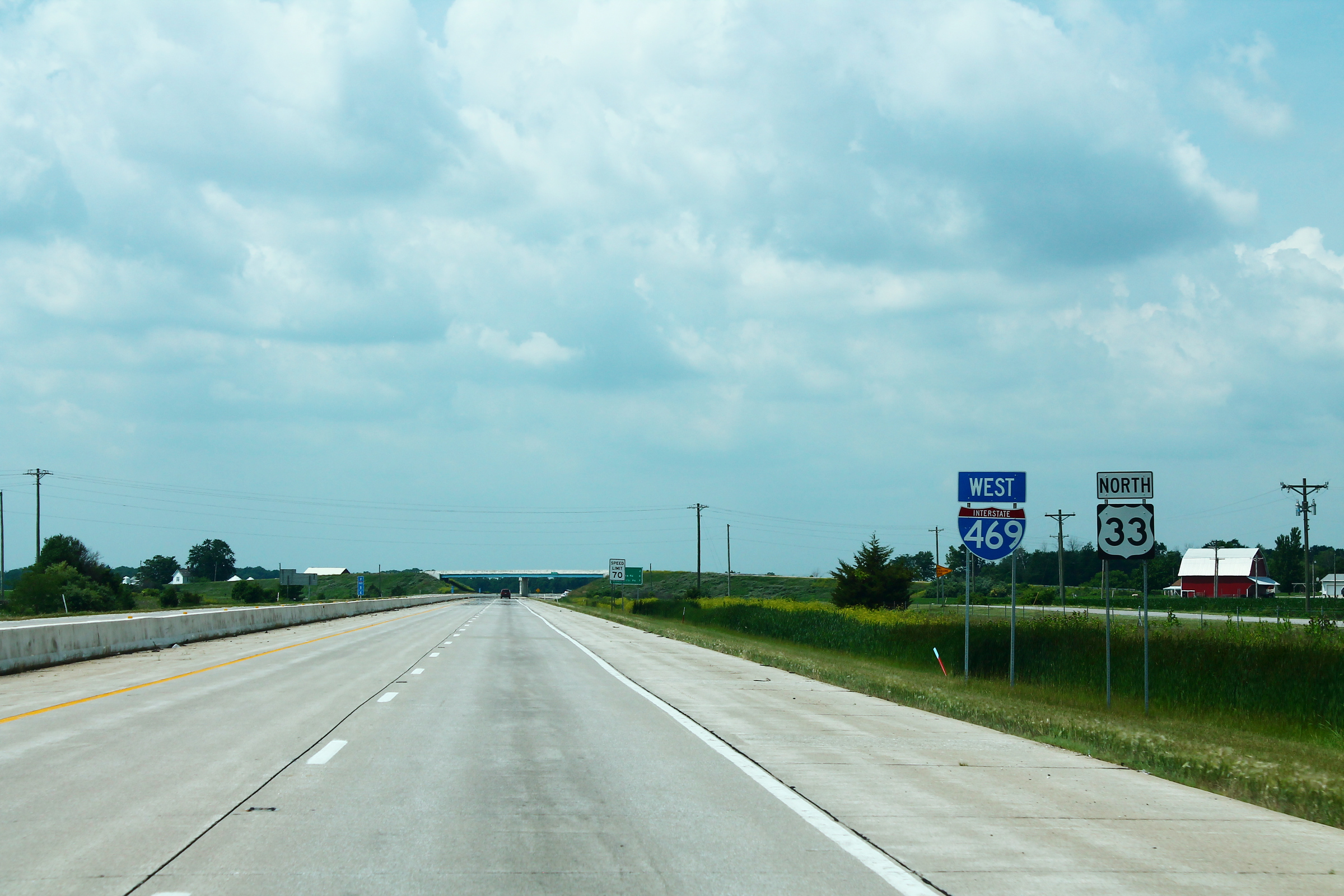
I-469 west near milemarker 8

In the 1950s, Coliseum Boulevard was built as a "circumurban" highway, and US 30 was rerouted onto it to bypass the downtown area of Fort Wayne. I-69 was constructed in the 1960s around the west side of the city; its first section opened in October 1962. In 1970, Eli Samaan created a transportation plan for Fort Wayne, including north–south and east–west expressways through the city, along with a route along the city's south and east edges. Fort Wayne mayor Ivan Lebamoff supported the east–west expressway, and the route was approved by the state. However, the estimated $110 million needed for the project could not be allocated, so the project was scrapped. When the state began looking for a solution to traffic issues on US 24 through Fort Wayne, plans for a bypass began. In large part due to heavy traffic on Coliseum Boulevard, which became known for its commercial properties and issues with bottlenecks, the idea gained support.

The original plans for the bypass were to connect I-69 to US 24 east of Fort Wayne. By 1981, these plans were expanded to connect to I-69 on the city's north side. Samaan stated that he had to convince Governor Otis Bowen in 1978 to expedite construction of the bypass. An additional factor appeared as contracts for the project were being awarded, when General Motors announced construction of an automotive plant in 1984 on Lafayette Center Road, where the bypass was planned to interchange with I-69. According to Samaan, this helped to accelerate construction when the state decided it would be beneficial to the new employer in the area, stating "I never have seen anything move that fast in my whole life."

Construction began in 1988, with the first section built between I-69 and Lafayette Center Road. In June 1989, the US 24 bypass received the I-469 designation. A temporary halt to construction occurred in 1991 when crews unearthed a lock that was once used in the Wabash and Erie Canal while constructing the interchange with US 24 east of New Haven. Upon the highway's completion in 1995, its construction was the most expensive in Allen County's history, with a cost of $207 million (equivalent to $388 million in 2024). In 1998, US 24 and US 30 were rerouted onto I-69 and I-469. In 2005, I-469 was given the name Ronald Reagan Expressway, in honor of the former US president.

== Exit list ==
The entire route is in Allen County.

Location	mi	km	Exit	Destinations	Notes
Lafayette Township	0.000	0.000	0	I-69 / US 33 north – Fort Wayne, Indianapolis	Western terminus; signed as exits 0A (I-69 south) and 0B (I-69 north/US 33); western end of US 33 concurrency; continues west as Lafayette Center Road; I-69 exits 296A-B
Lafayette Township	0.988	1.590	1	Lafayette Center Road east	
Lafayette Township	1.852	2.981	2	Indianapolis Road	Formerly SR 3
Pleasant Township	6.627	10.665	6	SR 1 south / Bluffton Road – Fort Wayne, Ossian, Bluffton, Fort Wayne International Airport	Northern terminus of the southern section of SR 1; serves Fort Wayne International Airport
Pleasant Township	9.213	14.827	9	Winchester Road	
Marion Township	11.572	18.623	11	US 27 / US 33 south – Fort Wayne, Decatur	Eastern end of US 33 concurrency
Marion Township	13.265	21.348	13	Marion Center Road	
Adams Township	15.772	25.383	15	Tillman Road	
New Haven	17.701	28.487	17	Minnich Road	
New Haven	19.421	31.255	19	US 30 east / SR 930 west (Lincoln Highway) – New Haven, Fort Wayne	Signed as exits 19A (US 30) and 19B (SR 930) south; southern end of US 30 concurrency
New Haven	20.874	33.593	21	US 24 east – Toledo	Signed as exits 21A (US 24) and 21B (Rose Avenue); southern end of US 24 concurrency
Fort Wayne	24.575	39.550	25	SR 37 north (Maysville Road) – Fort Wayne	Southern terminus of the northern section of SR 37
Fort Wayne	28.563	45.968	29	Maplecrest Road	Signed eastbound as exits 29A (south) and 29B (north)
Fort Wayne	30.567	49.193	31A	I-69 north – Lansing, MI	Westbound exit and eastbound entrance; I-69 exit 315
Fort Wayne	30.822	49.603	31C	Auburn Road	Westbound exit only
Fort Wayne	30.822	49.603	31B	I-69 south / US 24 west / US 30 west – Indianapolis	Eastern terminus; western end of US 24/US 30 concurrency; I-69 exit 315
1.000 mi = 1.609 km; 1.000 km = 0.621 mi: Concurrency terminus; Incomplete access
