= U.S. Route 33 in Indiana =

Highway in Indiana

U.S. Route 33
- US 33 highlighted in red

Route information
- Maintained by INDOT
- Length: 106.217 mi (170.940 km)

Major junctions
- South end: US 33 at the Ohio State line in Willshire, OH
- US 27 near Decatur; US 224 in Decatur; I-469 / US 24 / US 27 near Fort Wayne; I-69 / I-469 near Fort Wayne; US 24 near Fort Wayne; I-69 / US 30 near Fort Wayne; US 30 near Fort Wayne; US 6 near Ligonier
- North end: US 20 in Elkhart

Location
- Country: United States
- State: Indiana
- Counties: Adams, Allen, Whitley, Noble, Elkhart

Highway system
- United States Numbered Highway System; List; Special; Divided; Indiana State Highway System; Interstate; US; State; Scenic
← SR 32	→ US 35

U.S. Route 33 (US 33) is part of the United States Numbered Highway System that runs from Richmond, Virginia, to Elkhart of the US state of Indiana. In Indiana, it is a state road that enters the state at the Ohio state line between Willshire, Ohio, and Pleasant Mills, Indiana. The 106.217 miles (170.940 km) of US 33 that lie within Indiana serve as a major conduit. All of the highway is listed on the National Highway System. Various sections are rural two-lane highway, urbanized four-lane divided expressway and the Lincoln Highway. The northernmost community along the highway is Elkhart. The highway ends at an interchange in southern Elkhart after serving the northeastern region of Indiana. US 33 passes through farm fields and urban areas.

US 33 was first designated as a U.S. Highway in 1937. A section of the highway originally served as part of the Lincoln Highway, a connection between Fort Wayne and South Bend. US 41 replaced some the original State Road 2 (SR 2) designation of the highway which dated back to the formation of the Indiana State Road system. SR 2 ran from Illinois state line through South Bend to Elkhart and ended at the Ohio state line. Realignments and construction projects have expanded the highway to four lanes.

== Route description ==
US 33 enters Indiana from Ohio heading northwest towards Decatur, as a rural two-lane highway, passing through farmland with a few houses. Along the way passing through a short concurrency with State Road 101 (SR 101), in Pleasant Mills. The highway enters Decatur by curving due west. The road begins a concurrency with US 27, heading due north as a four-lane highway with a center turn lane. The concurrency passes through mostly commercial before heading into downtown Decatur. In downtown Decatur the two routes have an intersection with US 224, this is the southern end of the US 224 concurrency. The three routes head north having an intersection at the northern end of the US 224 concurrency, US 224 turns due west. After the concurrency with US 224, US 27 and US 33 head north and then northwest towards Fort Wayne and the road becomes a four-lane divided highway. On the south side of Fort Wayne is a diamond interchange with Interstate 469 (I-469), this interchange is the north end of the concurrency with US 27.

US 33 heads west on I-469. Both routes have an interchange with the northern terminus of the southern section of SR 1; this interchange has access to the Fort Wayne International Airport. After the interchange at SR 1, the interstate passes south of the airport. West of the airport is the terminus of I-469, US 33 turns north onto I-69, passing through rural areas with farmland as a four-lane interstate. Then, the interstate has an interchange with Airport Expressway/Lower Huntington Road. North of the Airport Expressway interchange, the roadway becomes a six-lane interstate, passing through urban areas with a mix of commercial and industrial properties. The highway enters the southwest side of Fort Wayne and US 24 joins the concurrency, heading Northeast. After the interchange with US 24, the interstate has an interchange with the eastern terminus SR 14, on the west side of Fort Wayne. After the interchange with SR 14, the highway turn northeast curving around Fort Wayne. On the northwest side of Fort Wayne, US 33 leaves I-69 heading northwest concurrent with US 30. The concurrency is a six-lane expressway, passing through woodlands with some commercial properties. Shortly after the concurrency with US 30 begins, it ends, with US 33 heading north and US 30 heading west. The highway becomes a four-lane highway with a center turn lane as it begins to leave Fort Wayne, passing through a mix of commercial and residential areas.

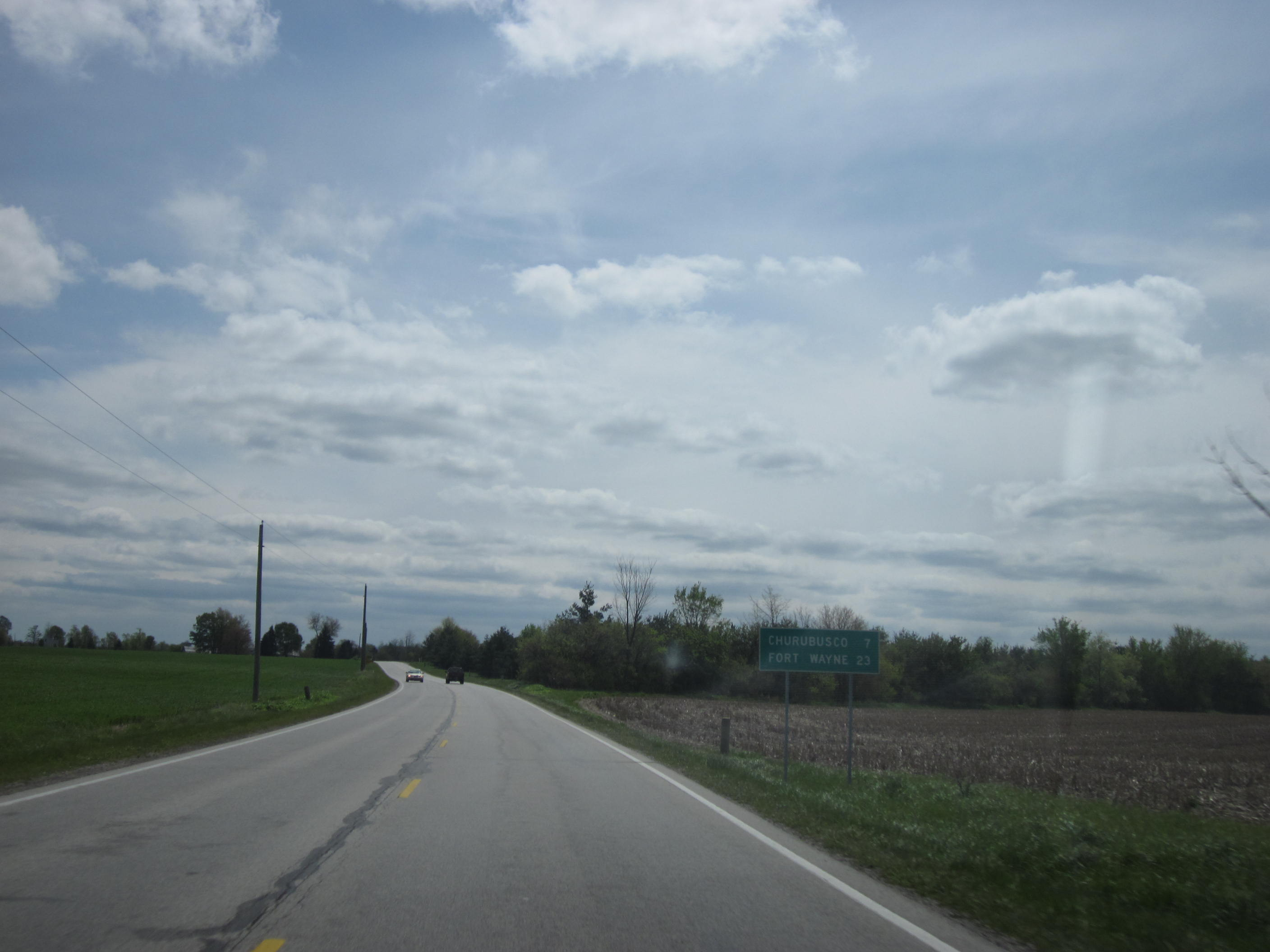
US 33 South of SR 9

The roadway leaves Fort Wayne heading northwest as a two-lane mainly rural highway, passing through farmland with some woods. In Churubusco, the route has a traffic light with SR 205. Then the road heads towards Ligonier, passing through a four-stop intersection with SR 9 in Merriam. Then in Wolf Lake the road has an intersection with SR 109 at the main intersection in town. Then south of Ligonier the road passes through Kimmell and the route begins a concurrency with SR 5. The concurrency with SR 5 ends at the intersection with US 6 in Ligonier. Both US 6 and US 33 head west away from Ligonier as a two-lane highway passing through farmland with some houses, for 5.75 miles (9.25 km). Then US 33 turns north, now concurrent with SR 13, the concurrency with SR 13 last for 2 miles (3.2 km), with SR 13 turning east and US 33 turning northwest. Now the road heads towards Goshen passing through Benton on the way.

The road enters Goshen on the southeast side of the city as a two-lane highway with a center turn lane, passing commercial properties. As the road gets closer to downtown Goshen the road narrows to a two-lane street without turn lanes and passes Goshen High School. After the high school the road has a traffic light with the old alignment of US 33, before curving northwest and parallel to the Norfolk Southern Chicago Line. While parallel to the rail tracks US 33 is a limited access roadway and passes over another rail track. The road and rail tacks separate as they enter downtown Goshen. US 33 enters downtown Goshen on Pike Street as a four-lane city street and has a traffic light at SR 15. The route leaves downtown Goshen as a four-lane undivided highway, passing through a commercial district and residential area. After crossing the Elkhart River the highway widens to a four-lane highway with a center turn lane. The route heads towards Elkhart, paralleling the Norfolk Southern railroad and passing through Midway and Dunlap. On the south side of Elkhart, US 33 has an interchange with US 20; this interchange is the northern terminus for US 33.

The entire length of US 33 in Indiana is included as a part of the National Highway System (NHS). The NHS is a network of highways that are identified as being most important for the economy, mobility and defense of the nation. The highway is maintained by the Indiana Department of Transportation (INDOT) like all other U.S. Highways in the state. The department tracks the traffic volumes along all state highways as a part of its maintenance responsibilities using a metric called average annual daily traffic (AADT). This measurement is a calculation of the traffic level along a segment of roadway for any average day of the year. In 2010, INDOT figured that lowest traffic levels were 3,290 vehicles and 650 commercial vehicles used the highway daily at the Noble-Whitley County area. The peak traffic volumes were 79,520 vehicles and 11,060 commercial vehicles AADT along the section of US 33 at is concurrent with I-69, between the SR 14 and US 30 exits in Fort Wayne.

== History ==
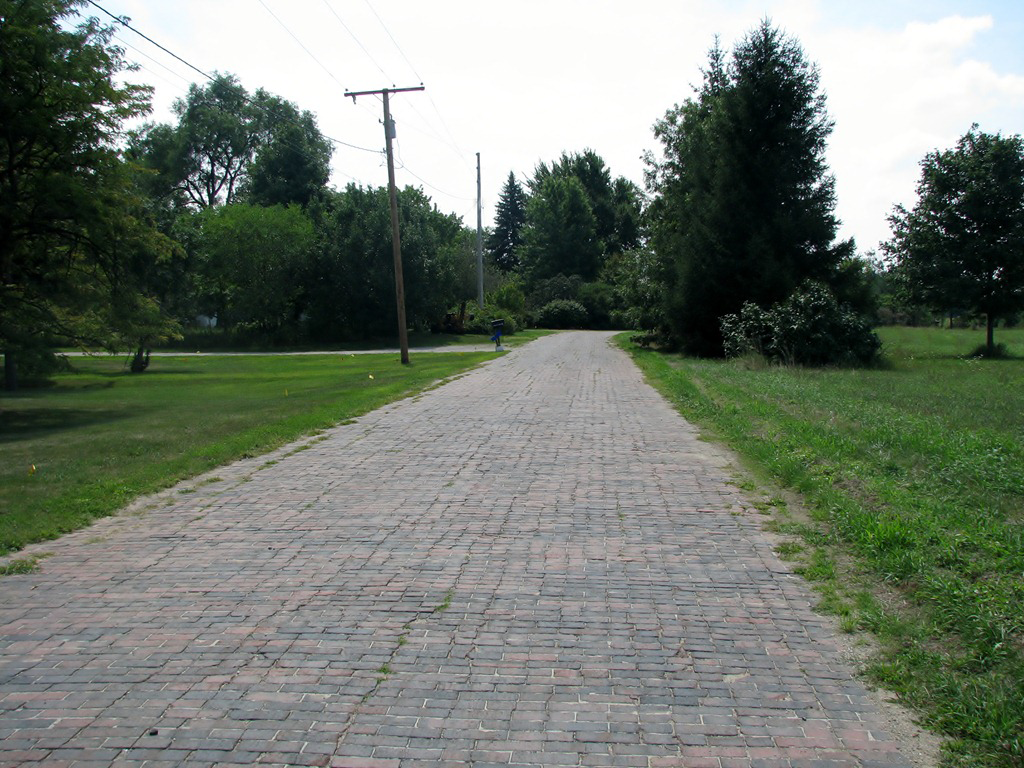
The Old Lincoln Highway (also old US 33) on the south side of Ligonier

The Lincoln Highway was planned from Illinois state line to South Bend to Fort Wayne and the Ohio state line in 1913. In 1915, the highway opened and passed through downtown Fort Wayne on its route through Indiana. In 1917, Main Market route number 2 was the given number to the Lincoln Highway in Indiana. In the early 1920s, the Lincoln Highway was moved farther south between Valparaiso and Fort Wayne, to what is now known mostly as Old US 30, passing through Plymouth and Warsaw. The route became SR 2 from Ohio state line to South Bend, SR 1 from South Bend to Michigan state line. Then in 1924, the sections of the road that was part of the original Lincoln Highway was paved. The next few years the rest of the route was paved across Indiana, then in 1937 US 33 was created.

Prior to its 1998 rerouting, US 33 followed a route through Fort Wayne. Entering from the south with US 27, the routes continued north along Decatur Road/Lafayette Street, before entering a one-way system of Lafayette Street (northbound) and Clinton Street (southbound). In downtown Fort Wayne, US 33 departed to the west on another one-way pair, with Washington Boulevard handling westbound (north US 33) traffic and Jefferson Boulevard handling eastbound (south US 33) traffic. After following these streets, the route departed to the north on a third one-way pair, with Ewing Street handling northbound traffic and Fairfield Avenue handling southbound traffic. These streets met at Superior Street, where US 33 turned to the east, before turning north on Van Buren Street and crossing the St. Mary's River to exit downtown Fort Wayne on Sherman Boulevard. The route continued north on Sherman until it met Goshen Avenue, which carried the route northwest out of the city.

In the 1980s, US 33 was rerouted to continue following the Lafayette/Clinton one-way pair through downtown towards the north, where the one-way pair ended at Spy Run Avenue. North of that intersection, US 33 departed to the northwest on Lima Road, before turning west on Coliseum Boulevard. After following Coliseum Boulevard, the route turned to the northeast at Goshen Road, and continued on its present-day route.

In 1998, INDOT rerouted most of its maintained routes onto interstate highways around Fort Wayne, so US 33 was routed onto I-469 and I-69 around the south side of the city. In the same year, INDOT removed US 33 north of US 20 and the St. Joseph County portion became SR 933. In 2004, INDOT tried to return SR 933 to the local communities but they did not accept.

In 2018 a new alignment of US 33 bypassing downtown Goshen to the northeast opened.

== Major intersections ==
County	Location	mi	km	Exit	Destinations	Notes
Adams	St. Marys Township	0.000	0.000		US 33 east – St. Marys, Wapakoneta, Columbus	Ohio state line
Adams	St. Marys Township	2.703	4.350		SR 101 south	Eastern end of SR 101 concurrency
Adams	St. Marys Township	2.876	4.628		SR 101 north (Monroe Street) – Monroeville	Western end of SR 101 concurrency
Adams	Decatur	8.505	13.687		US 27 south – Portland	Southern end of US 27 concurrency
Adams	Decatur	10.298	16.573		US 224 east – Van Wert	Southern end of US 224 concurrency
Adams	Decatur	10.506	16.908		US 224 west – Huntington	Northern end of US 224 concurrency
Allen	Marion Township	23.928	38.508	11	I-469 east / US 27 north	Northern end of US 27 concurrency
Allen	Pleasant Township	26.287	42.305	9	Winchester Road	
Allen	Pleasant Township	28.873	46.467	6	SR 1 south / Bluffton Road – Fort Wayne, Bluffton, Fort Wayne International Airport	Northern terminus of the southern section of SR 1
Allen	Lafayette Township	33.648	54.151	2	Indianapolis Road	former SR 3
Allen	Lafayette Township	34.512	55.542	1	Lafayette Center Road east	
Allen	Lafayette Township	35.500	57.132	296; 0	I-69 south – Indianapolis	Southern end of I-69 concurrency and western terminus of I-469; Exit 296 on I-69 and Exit 0 on I-469
Allen	Lafayette Township	38.034	61.210	299	Airport Expressway – Lower Huntington Road	To Fort Wayne International Airport
Allen	Fort Wayne	41.045	66.056	302	US 24 west / Jefferson Road – Huntington, Fort Wayne	Southern end of US 24 concurrency
Allen	Fort Wayne	44.282	71.265	305	SR 14 west / Illinois Road – South Whitley, Fort Wayne	Eastern terminus of SR 14
Allen	Fort Wayne	48.238	77.632	309	I-69 north / US 24 east / US 30 east SR 930 east / Lincoln Highway / Goshen Road – Fort Wayne	Northern end of I-69 concurrency and eastern end of US 30 concurrency; northern end of US 24 concurrency; western terminus of SR 930
Allen	Fort Wayne	48.238	77.632	—	US 30 west – Columbia City, Warsaw, Chicago	Western end of US 30 concurrency; trumpet interchange
Whitley	Churubusco	58.886	94.768		SR 205 (Whitley Street) – Columbia City, Garrett	
Noble	Merriam	66.382	106.831		SR 9 – Columbia City, Albion	
Noble	Merriam	66.400	106.860		Lincoln Highway (50 West)	
Noble	Merriam	67.096	107.981		Lincoln Highway (Oak Street)	
Noble	Wolflake	70.905	114.111		SR 109 south – Columbia City	Northern terminus of SR 109
Noble	Kimmell	75.967	122.257		Lincoln Highway (Clark Street)	
Noble	Kimmell	77.196	124.235		Lincoln Highway (Clark Street)	
Noble	Ligonier	79.399	127.780		SR 5 south – Cromwell	Southern end of SR 5 concurrency
Noble	Ligonier	81.076	130.479		US 6 east / SR 5 north / Lincoln Highway – Kendallville, Shipshewana	Eastern end of US 6 concurrency and northern end of SR 5 concurrency
Elkhart	Benton Township	86.833	139.744		US 6 west / SR 13 south – Nappanee, Wabash	Western end of US 6 concurrency and southern end of SR 13 concurrency
Elkhart	Benton Township	87.870	141.413		SR 13 north / Lincoln Highway – Millersburg, Middlebury	Northern end of SR 13 concurrency
Elkhart	Goshen	95.970	154.449		CR 38 – Wakarusa, Topeka	
Elkhart	Goshen	98.962	159.264		Lincoln Highway (Madison Street)	
Elkhart	Goshen	98.972	159.280		Lincoln Highway (Main Street)	
Elkhart	Goshen	99.044	159.396		SR 15 (3rd Street)	
Elkhart	Goshen	99.395	159.961		Lincoln Highway (Chicago Avenue)	
Elkhart	Goshen	101.823	163.868		Lincoln Highway (Peddlers Village Road)	
Elkhart	Goshen	102.796	165.434		CR 17 – Elkhart, Goshen	Grade separation; indirect access via Rieth Boulevard
Elkhart	Elkhart	105.166	169.248		Lincoln Highway (Sunnyside Avenue)	
Elkhart	Elkhart	106.110– 106.217	170.767– 170.940		US 20 – South Bend, Angola	Northern terminus of US 33
1.000 mi = 1.609 km; 1.000 km = 0.621 mi: Concurrency terminus

== See also ==
U.S. Route 33
Previous state: Terminus	Indiana	Next state: Ohio
