= Indiana State Road 1 =

State highway in Indiana, United States

State Road 1
- SR 1 highlighted in red

Route information
- Maintained by INDOT
- Length: 179.580 mi (289.006 km)
- Existed: October 1, 1926–present

Southern segment
- Length: 138.185 mi (222.387 km)
- South end: I-275 / US 50 in Greendale
- Major intersections: I-74 in Saint Leon; US 52 in Brookville; US 40 in Cambridge City; I-70 near Cambridge; US 35 near Economy; US 36 in Modoc; US 224 near Ossian
- North end: I-469 / US 33 near Fort Wayne

Northern segment
- Length: 41.395 mi (66.619 km)
- South end: I-69 in Fort Wayne
- Major intersections: US 6 in Butler
- North end: US 20 near Angola

Location
- Country: United States
- State: Indiana
- Counties: Dearborn; Franklin; Fayette; Wayne; Randolph; Jay; Wells; Allen; DeKalb; Steuben

Highway system
- Indiana State Highway System; Interstate; US; State; Scenic
← SR 933	→ SR 2

State Road 1 (SR 1) is a north–south state highway in eastern Indiana, consisting of two segments. Its southern segment begins at U.S. Highway 50 and Interstate 275 in east-central Dearborn County, just east of Lawrenceburg, and ends at Interstate 469 south of Fort Wayne. Its northern segment begins at Interstate 69 on Fort Wayne's north side, and ends at U.S. Route 20 in east-central Steuben County, approximately 6 miles (9.7 km) east of Angola.

== Route description ==
=== Southern section ===
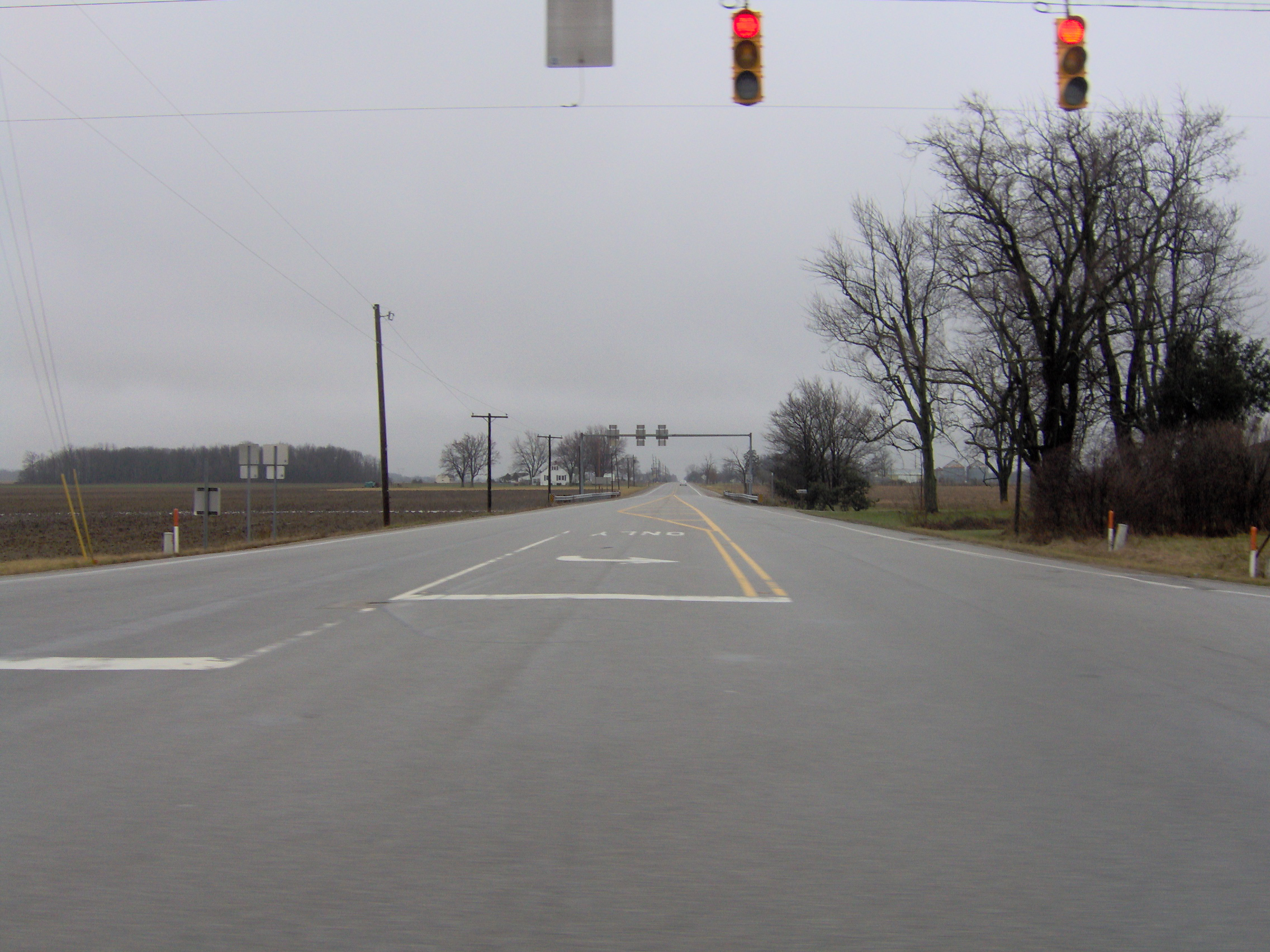
View southward along State Road 1 from the intersection with US 224, January 2007

State Road 1 begins at an interchange of Interstate 275; this is I-275's only exit in Indiana. Just after the interchange there is a stop light at U.S. Route 50 (US 50). SR 1 travels 14.53 miles (23.38 km) north-northwest until it reaches I-74; just beyond I-74 it crosses Indiana State Road 46 (SR 46). SR 1 continues north until it meets U.S. Route 52 (US 52) just west of Cedar Grove. Then US 52 and SR 1 continue north-northeast for 5.78 miles (9.30 km) until they reach Brookville; here, US 52 turns west on its way to Indianapolis, while SR 1 continues north-northwest for 16.81 miles (27.05 km) where it meets Indiana State Road 44 (SR 44). SR 1 and SR 44 travel together for 0.47 miles (0.76 km) where SR 1 turns north-northeast towards downtown Connersville. North of Connersville, SR 1 travels north-northwest until it reaches Cambridge City, where SR 1 crosses U.S. Route 40 (US 40). After the intersection at US 40, SR 1 heads north-northeast. After 2.90 miles (4.67 km) SR 1 has an interchange with Interstate 70 (I-70), then heads due north towards U.S. Route 36 (US 36). SR 1 turns east onto US 36 for 1.01 miles (1.63 km), then leaves US 36 and travels generally due north until it reaches Fort Wayne. Just south of Fort Wayne, SR 1 ends at an interchange with Interstate 469 (I-469).

=== Northern section ===
On the north side of Fort Wayne at the Dupont Road interchange of Interstate 69 (I-69), the northern section of SR 1 begins and heads east. The road heads away from I–69 as a six-lane divided highway, along the south edge of the Parkview Regional Medical Center complex, passing through numerous commercial properties. The highway narrows to a four-lane divided highway at Diebold Road and then enters an area of mixed commercial and residential properties. At Tonkel Road, SR 1 begins to curve northeast toward Leo and narrows to a two-lane highway. The route then leaves Fort Wayne, passing through rural farm land with scattered houses. Curving due north to enter Leo on Main Street, SR 1 then passes through residential areas of that town. North of downtown Leo the highway curves northeast and passes through a mix of commercial and residential properties. As the road enters DeKalb County it curves to run due north. The highway then enters Spencerville, passing through the center of town. After Spencerville, the road curves northeast, before again turning back north. The highway enters St. Joe and takes a sharp curve to head due east. The route crosses CSX Railroad tracks and makes another sharp curve heading due north. The road continues north until it meets SR 8. The two routes head east-southeast for a 1.04 miles (1.67 km) concurrency, until SR 1 departs the joint section heading due north. The road then passes through rural farmland, with a few houses, as a two-lane highway. Upon entering Butler it crosses the Norfolk Southern Railroad tracks, before encountering a signalized intersection with US 6 in downtown Butler. SR 1 then leaves Butler heading due north until it intersects DeKalb County Road 46, at which point the highway turns northwest. The route enter Hamilton and begins a concurrency with SR 427, heading northeast and passing Hamilton Lake. After 0.84 miles (1.35 km), SR 1 leaves the concurrency heading due north. The highway then continues in that direction until reaching its northern terminus at US 20.

== History ==
=== Lawrenceburg ===
SR 1 began at US 50 and Main Street in Lawrenceburg and traveled north on Main Street until Main Street became Ridge Avenue. It then followed Ridge Avenue until it met the current SR 1.

=== Bluffton to Fort Wayne ===
Between the late 1940s and late 1950s, SR 1 had three or more lanes. This started in Bluffton and continued north to Fort Wayne.

=== Fort Wayne ===
Before being split into two sections on either side of Fort Wayne, SR 1 traveled on a continuous route through that city. From the present northern terminus of its southern section at Interstate 469's exit 6 in south-central Allen County, it continued north on Bluffton Road to pass just east of Fort Wayne's main airport (then known as Baer Field). In the Waynedale district of southwestern Fort Wayne, SR 3 joined Bluffton Road from the southwest at Lower Huntington Road. From there the routes originally continued together northward, hugging the bank of the St. Mary's River before curving east to bridge it. SR 1/SR 3 then immediately turned right (south) onto Broadway for about 700 feet (210 m) before turning east on Rudisill Boulevard. From there the routes continued to a one way pair of Clinton Street (southbound) and Lafayette Street (northbound), which then carried a concurrency of US 27 from Decatur and US 33 from St. Marys, Ohio. At Lima Road, SR 3 split to the northwest, as US 27 and SR 1 continued on Clinton. At Coldwater Road, US 27 split from the route, and SR 1 went northeast on Clinton Street/Leo Road (this intersection was also the southern terminus of SR 427 until 1965). At Tonkel Road, SR 427 departed to the north, while SR 1 continued on its current alignment.

In later years, after the decommissioning of SR 3 through Fort Wayne and the completion of the Baer Field Thruway (later renamed Airport Expressway), SR 1 was rerouted to turn right onto that roadway, which deposited motorists onto Paulding Road at Fairfield Avenue. From there SR 1 headed east along Paulding Road to its intersection with US 27/US 33 (now Lafayette Street), where it turned left (north) and joined those routes to downtown Fort Wayne. North of the Lafayette/Clinton one-way pair, US 27/SR 1 turned northwest onto Lima Road. The routes followed that road until the interchange with Interstate 69, where US 27/SR 1 joined that route going north, while SR 3 resumed going north on Lima Road. SR 1 left Interstate 69 at Dupont road and followed its current alignment, while US 27 was concurrent with I-69 into Michigan.

=== Steuben County ===
At one point, the northern terminus was at SR 120 just west of the Ohio State Line.

== Major intersections ==
County	Location	mi	km	Destinations	Notes
Dearborn	Greendale	0.000	0.000	I-275 / US 50 – Lawrenceburg, Cincinnati (Ohio)	Exit 16 on I-275; southern terminus of SR 1
Dearborn	Saint Leon	14.618– 14.708	23.525– 23.670	I-74 – Indianapolis, Cincinnati (Ohio)	Exit 164 on I-74
Dearborn	Saint Leon	14.962	24.079	SR 46 – Batesville, Greensburg, West Harrison	
Franklin	Cedar Grove	20.751	33.395	US 52 east – West Harrison	Southern end of US 52 concurrency
Franklin	Brookville			SR 252 east (E 4th Street) – Hamilton (Ohio), Ross (Ohio)	Western terminus of SR 252
Franklin	Brookville	26.606	42.818	US 52 west / SR 101 north – Rushville	Northern end of US 52 concurrency; southern of SR 101 concurrency
Franklin	Brookville	26.784	43.105	SR 101 north – Liberty, Richmond	Northern end of SR 101 concurrency
Fayette	Connersville	43.446	69.920	SR 44 east – Liberty	Eastern end of SR 44 concurrency
Fayette	Connersville	43.924	70.689	SR 44 west to SR 121 – Rushville	Western end of SR 44 concurrency
Wayne	Cambridge City	56.876	91.533	US 40 – Greenfield, Richmond	
Wayne	Cambridge City	59.705– 59.872	96.086– 96.355	I-70 – Indianapolis, Columbus (Ohio)	Exit 137 on I-70
Wayne	Hagerstown	63.706	102.525	SR 38 – New Castle, Richmond	
Wayne	Losantville	68.777	110.686	US 35 – Richmond, Muncie	
Randolph	Modoc	73.305	117.973	US 36 west – Indianapolis	Western end of US 36 concurrency
Randolph	Modoc	74.320	119.606	US 36 east – Greenville (Ohio)	Eastern end of US 36 concurrency
Randolph	Farmland	83.049	133.654	SR 32 east – Winchester	Southern end of SR 32 concurrency
Randolph	Farmland	84.353	135.753	SR 32 west – Muncie	Northern end of SR 32 concurrency
Randolph	Green Township	92.277	148.505	SR 28 – Albany, Union City	
Jay	Redkey	96.487	155.281	SR 67 – Muncie, Albany, Portland	
Jay	Knox Township	102.671	165.233	SR 26 east – Portland	Southern end of SR 26 concurrency
Jay	Knox Township	103.172	166.039	SR 26 west – Hartford City	Northern end of SR 26 concurrency
Jay	Penn Township	110.237	177.409	SR 18 – Montpelier, Bryant	
Wells	Nottingham Township	117.303	188.781	SR 218 – Warren, Berne	
Wells	Bluffton	122.011	196.358	SR 116 east – Geneva	Southern end of SR 116 concurrency
Wells	Bluffton	123.555	198.842	SR 124 east – Monroe	Southern end of SR 124 concurrency
Wells	Bluffton	124.555	200.452	SR 116 west / SR 124 west – Peru, Markle	Northern end of SR 116 and SR 124 concurrencies
Wells	Jefferson Township	129.597	208.566	US 224 – Huntington, Markle, Decatur	
Allen	Fort Wayne	138.144– 138.185	222.321– 222.387	I-469 / US 33 – New Haven, Decatur	Exit 6 on I-469; northern terminus of the southern section of SR 1
Gap in route
Allen	Fort Wayne	138.186– 138.239	222.389– 222.474	I-69 – Indianapolis, Lansing (Michigan)	Exit 316 on I-69; southern terminus of the northern section of SR 1; Diverging diamond interchange
DeKalb	Concord Township	157.575	253.592	SR 8 west – Auburn	Western end of SR 8 concurrency
DeKalb	Concord Township	158.583	255.215	SR 8 east / SR 101 south – Woodburn, Hicksville (Ohio)	Northern terminus of SR 101; Eastern end of SR 8 concurrency
DeKalb	Butler	163.695	263.442	US 6 – Waterloo, Edgerton (Ohio)	
DeKalb	Hamilton	172.124	277.007	SR 427 south – Waterloo	Southern end of SR 427 concurrnecy
DeKalb	Hamilton	172.946	278.330	SR 427 north – Edon (Ohio)	Northern end of SR 427 concurrency
Steuben	Scott Township	179.580	289.006	US 20 – Angola, Toledo (Ohio)	Northern terminus of SR 1
1.000 mi = 1.609 km; 1.000 km = 0.621 mi: Concurrency terminus

== See also ==
- List of state roads in Indiana
- List of highways numbered 1
