= U.S. Route 27 in Indiana =

Highway in Indiana

U.S. Route 27
- Gene Stratton Memorial Highway
- US 27 highlighted in red

Route information
- Maintained by INDOT
- Length: 117.765 mi (189.524 km)
- Existed: October 1, 1926–present

Major junctions
- South end: US 27 at the Ohio state line in West College Corner
- US 40 at Richmond; I-70 / US 35 near Richmond; US 36 near Lynn; US 33 near Decatur; US 224 at Decatur; I-469 / US 33 at Fort Wayne
- North end: I-69 / US 24 / US 30 / SR 3 at Fort Wayne

Location
- Country: United States
- State: Indiana
- Counties: Union, Wayne, Randolph, Jay, Adams, Allen

Highway system
- United States Numbered Highway System; List; Special; Divided; Indiana State Highway System; Interstate; US; State; Scenic
← SR 26	→ SR 28

U.S. Route 27 (US 27) is a part of the United States Numbered Highway System that runs from Miami, Florida, to Fort Wayne in the U.S. state of Indiana. In Indiana, it is a state road that enters the state in College Corner, Ohio, and West College Corner. The 117.765 miles (189.524 km) of US 27 that lie within Indiana serve as a major conduit. Most of the highway is listed on the National Highway System. Various sections are a rural two-lane highway or an urbanized four-lane divided highway. The northernmost community along the highway is Fort Wayne in the northeast part of the state. The highway ends at an interchange with Interstate 69 (I-69) north of downtown Fort Wayne after serving the east central and northeast regions of Indiana.

US 27 passes through farm fields and urban areas, and parallel to the Ohio state line. The highway is included in the Gene Stratton Memorial Highway. Historical landmarks along the highway include the Levi Coffin House, Portland Commercial Historic District, and the Allen County Courthouse.

US 27 was first designated as a U.S. Highway in 1926. US 27 replaced the original State Road 48 (SR 48), SR 21, and SR 46 designations of the highway which dated back to the formation of the Indiana State Road system. SR 46 ran from Ohio state line to Liberty, and SR 21 ran from Liberty through Richmond to Portland ending in Fort Wayne. SR 46 ran from Auburn to Angola. Realignments and construction projects have expanded the highway to four lanes in Adams and Allen counties.

== Route description ==
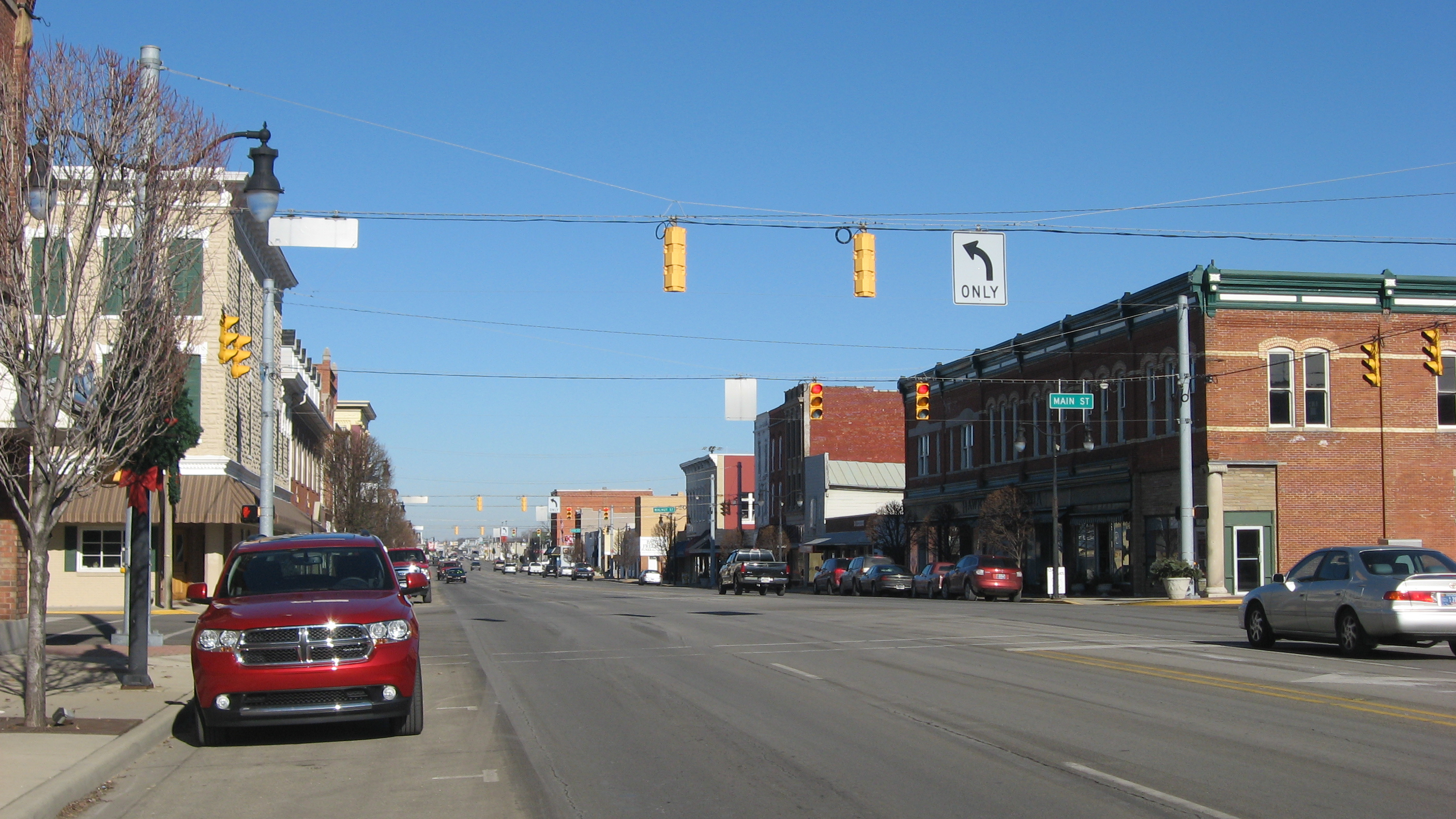
Looking north on Meridian Street (US 27) from Main Street in downtown Portland

US 27 enters Indiana heading northwest from Ohio, parallel to CSX Transportation railroad track, in the town of West College Corner. In West College Corner, the highway passes through the center of town, on a street named Liberty Avenue. The route continues northwest toward Liberty, as a two-lane rural highway passing through farmland. On the way to Liberty, the road passes through Cottage Grove and crosses the Indiana Eastern Railroad. In Liberty, the highway has an all-way stop at SR 44; this intersection is the southern end of the SR 44 concurrency. In the center of Liberty, the two roads end the concurrency at a traffic light with SR 101, with US 27 heading north, SR 44 heading west, and SR 101 heading south. US 27 leaves Liberty, heading due north as a two-lane rural highway. The road enters Richmond from the south, with a series of curves and a traffic light at SR 227. US 27 and SR 227 begin a concurrency at this traffic light, and both routes head north, heading for downtown Richmond. The concurrency passes over the Indiana Eastern Railroad tracks, as a four-lane undivided road. In downtown Richmond, the roadway becomes one-way streets, beginning after O Street, with northbound on 9th Street and southbound on 8th Street. The two streets head straight through downtown, passing residential areas before reaching commercial areas. At C Street, the one-way pairs end and the road passes over Norfolk Southern Railway tracks. After the railroad tracks, the concurrency with SR 227 ends with SR 227 heading northeast. US 27 continues northerly as a four-lane undivided highway. The road leaves Richmond as it passes through the single-point urban interchange with I-70 and US 35. The route heads north-northwest from Richmond toward Portland as a two-lane rural highway passing through farmland with a few houses. The road continues through Fountain City passing the Levi Coffin House, a building on the National Historic Landmark list.

The highway passes through Lynn and then has an intersection with US 36. North of US 36 the highway heads toward Winchester. The road passes Winchester on the east side. While in Winchester, US 27 passes a mix of commercial, residential, and farmland and also has an interchange with SR 32. The road begins a concurrency with SR 26 south of the Portland Commercial Historic District, a historic district that is listed on the National Register of Historic Places. The concurrency passes through the historic district as a four-lane road with a center turn lane. North of the historic district, the concurrency with SR 26 ends and a concurrency with SR 67 begins. After SR 26, the two routes head through commercial properties, with a few houses, as a two-lane street with a center turn lane. The concurrency heads north, leaving Portland as a two-lane rural highway and passing through farmland with a few houses. The concurrency enters Bryant, and, on the north side of town, the concurrency ends with SR 67. The route encounters a traffic-light at SR 124 west of Monroe. At this traffic-light, the road becomes a four-lane divided highway, heading north toward Fort Wayne. On the way to Fort Wayne, the route passes through Decatur, and, at a traffic-light, a concurrency with US 33 begins. As the two highways head farther into Decatur, US 224 joins the other two routes in a concurrency with three routes. US 224 leaves the concurrency heading due west for Huntington. The other two routes continue north-northwest, leaving Decatur and heading for Fort Wayne.

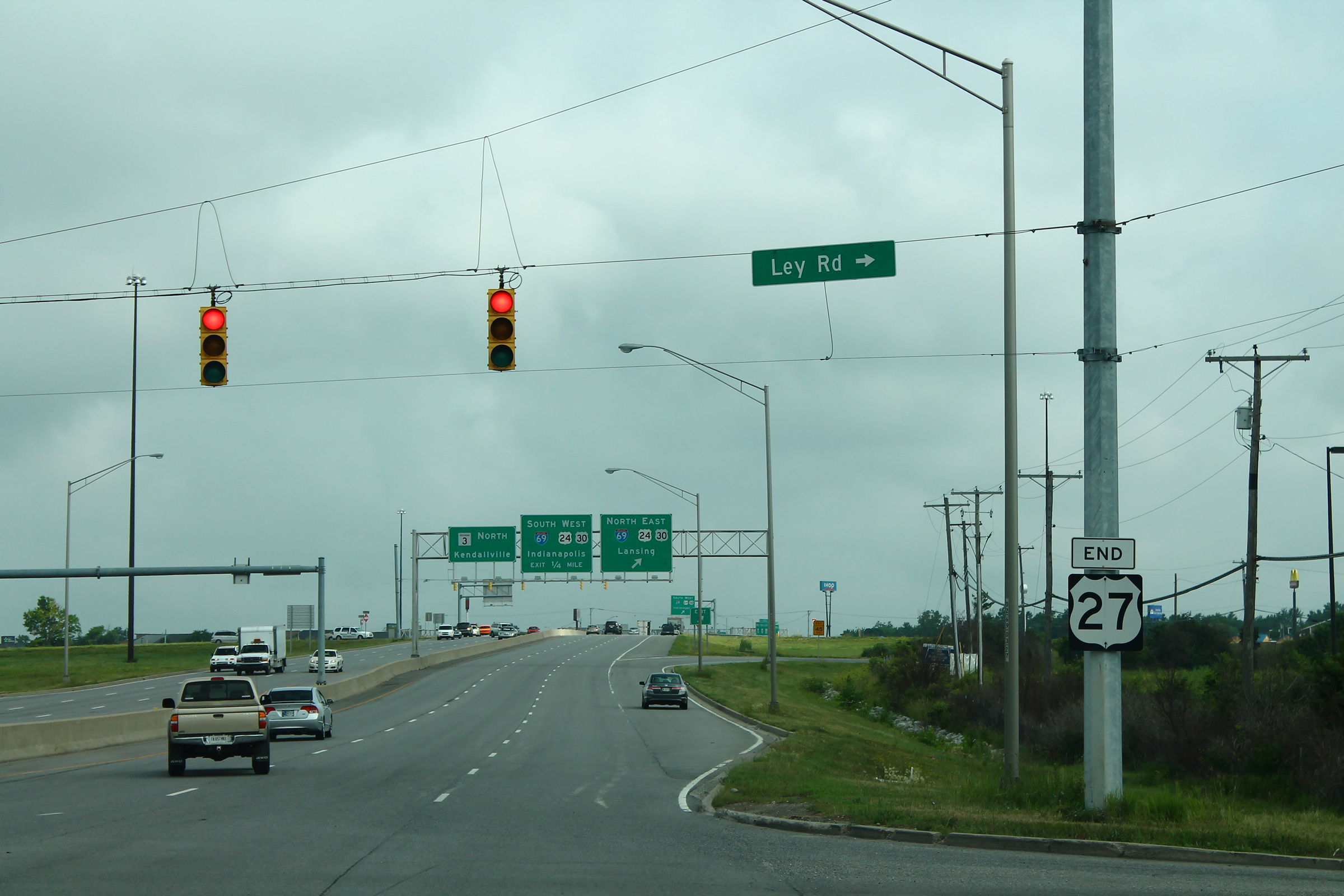
Northern terminus of US 27 in Fort Wayne

The concurrency with US 33 ends at a diamond interchange with I-469 on the south side of Fort Wayne. North of I-469, the road becomes known as Decatur Road and continues northwest, passing through farmland with houses. The name of the road changes to Lafayette Street at a traffic-light with Anthony Boulevard. North of this traffic-light, the road enters commercial areas followed by residential areas. The road becomes a four-lane undivided highway north of Pettit Avenue. The route becomes one-way pairs at McKinnie Avenue with northbound on Lafayette Street and Spy Run Avenue and southbound is on Clinton Street. Both one-way streets pass under the Chicago, Fort Wayne and Eastern Railroad and enter downtown Fort Wayne. In downtown, the streets past near the Allen County Courthouse and Parkview Field. Parkview Field is home to the Fort Wayne TinCaps a Minor League Baseball team in the Midwest League. The road then passes under the Norfolk Southern Railway tracks and passes through Headwaters Park. The streets leaves downtown by crossing over the St. Marys River. North of Spy Run Avenue Extended, the one-way pairs end and the road becomes a four-lane highway with a center turn lane, retaining the name Clinton Street. Clinton Street is passing through commercial properties. US 27 leaves Clinton Street and heads north on Lima Road. Lima Road then passes through a mix of residential and commercial properties as a four-lane undivided highway. The street has a traffic-light at SR 930, also known as Coliseum Boulevard. At this traffic-light, Lima Road becomes a six-lane divided highway passing through commercial property and heads toward an interchange at I-69. The interchange at I-69 is the northern terminus of US 27, Lima Road continues north as SR 3 toward Kendallville.

The entire length of US 27 in Indiana is included in the National Highway System (NHS). The NHS is a network of highways that are identified as being most important for the economy, mobility, and defense of the nation. The highway is maintained by the Indiana Department of Transportation (INDOT) like all other U.S. Highways in the state. The department tracks the traffic volumes along all state highways as a part of its maintenance responsibilities using a metric called Annual average daily traffic (AADT). This measurement is a calculation of the traffic level along a segment of roadway for any average day of the year. In 2010, INDOT figured that lowest traffic levels were 3,090 vehicles and 580 commercial vehicles used the highway daily from SR 28 to Jay County line. The peak traffic volumes were 41,790 vehicles and 2,570 commercial vehicles AADT along the section of US 27 just north of downtown Fort Wayne.

The bridge over I-70 immediately north of Richmond is named the "Officer Seara Burton Memorial Bridge", in honor of Richmond police officer and K-9 handler Burton, who was shot by the subject of a traffic stop on August 10, 2022. Burton, who was engaged to be married later in August, died on September 18.

== History ==
The original route of US 27 was signed as three different state roads in 1918. The section of Old SR 48 that traveled from the Ohio state line to Liberty, where Old SR 48 then headed west on what is now known as SR 44. The section that was from Liberty to Fort Wayne was Old SR 21. Old SR 46 was the original number given the a segment from Auburn to Angola. The section between Old SR 21 and Old SR 46 was known as Custer Trail. In 1924, the section north of Fort Wayne became Old SR 13 and went from Fort Wayne to the Michigan state line. US 27 in Indiana is one of the original U.S. Highways of 1926, then connecting Cheboygan, Michigan, with Cincinnati, Ohio, through Fort Wayne.

In November 1967, Indiana completed its northern segment of I-69, the last incomplete section being opened between Angola and the Michigan–Indiana state line, supplanting US 27 as a through route. As I-69 north of Fort Wayne had been completed in stages, the designation of US 27 was moved to the Interstate. Some segments of old US 27 remained as state highways with designations as SR 327, SR 427, and SR 127. Parts of these routes, comprising what had been the old surface road of US 27, were eventually returned to local governments. Within greater Fort Wayne, US 27 was diverted from Coldwater Road to Lima Road. Then, in 2001, INDOT removed the US 27 designation north of its interchange with I-69.

On March 9, 2007, legislation was introduced in the Indiana House of Representatives to designate US 27 as historic highway. Richmond, one of the cities through which US 27 passes, would have two historic highways passing through it as the original National Road (US 40) runs through Richmond as well.

== Major intersections ==
County	Location	mi	km	Destinations	Notes
Union	West College Corner	0.000	0.000	US 27 south – Oxford, Cincinnati	Ohio state line
Union	Liberty	7.365	11.853	SR 44 east (Eaton Street) – Union County High School, Camden	Southern end of SR 44 concurrency
Union	Liberty	7.795	12.545	SR 101 south (South Main Street) – Brookville Lake, Whitewater State Park, Quakertown S.R.A., Mounds S.R.A, Brookville	Northern terminus of SR 101
Union	Liberty	7.856	12.643	SR 44 west (Union Street) – Connersville	Northern end of SR 44 concurrency
Wayne	Richmond	20.102	32.351	SR 227 south – Richmond Municipal Airport, Boston	Southern end of SR 227 concurrency
Wayne	Richmond	21.827– 22.058	35.127– 35.499	US 40	
Wayne	Richmond	22.752	36.616	SR 227 north / SR 121 north – Union City, Greenville	Northern end of SR 227 concurrency; southern terminus of SR 121
Wayne	Richmond	24.929– 25.016	40.119– 40.259	I-70 / US 35 – Indianapolis, Dayton	Single-point urban interchange; exit 151 on I-70
Randolph	Lynn	38.098	61.313	US 36	
Randolph	Winchester	46.549	74.913	SR 32 – Winchester, Union City	interchange
Randolph	Ward Township	54.006	86.914	SR 28 – Ridgeville, Union City	
Jay	Portland	64.629	104.010	SR 26 east – Fort Recovery	Southern end of SR 26 concurrency
Jay	Portland	65.120	104.800	SR 26 west / SR 67 south – Hartford City, Muncie	Northern end of SR 26 concurrency and southern end of SR 67 concurrency
Jay	Bryant	72.308	116.368	SR 18 west / SR 67 north	Eastern terminus of SR 18; northern end of SR 67 concurrency
Adams	Geneva	75.869	122.099	SR 116 west	Eastern terminus of SR 116
Adams	Berne	80.519	129.583	SR 218 (Main Street)	
Adams	Monroe	86.564	139.311	SR 124 – Bluffton, Monroe, Willshire	
Adams	Decatur	90.952	146.373	US 33 south – Willshire	Southern end of US 33 concurrency
Adams	Decatur	92.735	149.243	US 224 east – Van Wert	Southern end of US 224 concurrency
Adams	Decatur	92.953	149.593	US 224 west – Markle, Huntington	Northern end of US 224 concurrency
Allen	Fort Wayne	106.335– 106.427	171.130– 171.278	I-469 / US 33 north	Northern end of US 33 concurrency
Allen	Fort Wayne	116.851	188.053	SR 930 (Coliseum Boulevard)	
Allen	Fort Wayne	117.507– 117.765	189.109– 189.524	I-69 / US 24 / US 30 / SR 3 north – Indianapolis, Lansing, Kendallville	Northern terminus of US 27; roadway continues north as SR 3; southern end of northern segment of SR 3
1.000 mi = 1.609 km; 1.000 km = 0.621 mi: Concurrency terminus

== See also ==
U.S. Route 27
Previous state: Ohio	Indiana	Next state: Michigan
