= Huntington County Community School Corporation =

School district in Indiana

Huntington County Community School Corporation (HCCSC) is the Indiana public school district in Huntington County, Indiana, USA. It operates five K-5 elementary schools, two middle schools, and one high school. HCCSC serves all of Huntington County including the communities of Andrews, Bippus, Huntington, Majenica, Markle, Mount Etna, Roanoke, and Warren.

As of the 2018–19 school year, 5,126 students attend the schools.

Since fall 2012 HCCSC is a 21st Century School Corporation, meaning the students have a 1:1 technology advantage. That technology is the use of MacBooks and iPads. Currently [when?] only the two middle schools and high school are using the MacBooks, with all of the five remaining elementary schools using the iPads.

== Administration ==
All administrators work at Salamonie School, one of the elementary schools that also serves as the administration office.

The Superintendent of Huntington County Community School Corporation is Randy Harris.

== Elementary schools ==
The five elementary schools in HCCSC include Andrews Elementary, Flint Springs Elementary, Horace Mann Elementary, Roanoke Elementary, and Salamonie School.

Andrews Elementary School is located in Andrews, Indiana in Huntington County. The school's principal is Amy Rudolf. During the 2018–19 school year, the school had 362 students enrolled.

Flint Springs Elementary School is in Huntington, Indiana. The principal is BreAnne Dyer . During the 2018–19 school year, Flint Springs Elementary had an enrollment of 469 students.

Horace Mann Elementary School also located in Huntington, reopened during the 2018–19 school year having been closed since the 2011. The principal is Chris Baut. There were 418 students enrolled during the 2018–19 school year.

Lincoln Elementary is located in Huntington, and had an enrollment of 359 students for the 2018–19 school year. The principal is Jennifer Yarger

Roanoke Elementary School is located in Roanoke, Indiana in Huntington County. The enrollment for 2018-19 was 418 students. The school's principal is Jami Craft.

Salamonie School is located in Warren, Indiana in Huntington County. The school had an attendance of 297 students during the 2018–19 school year. The principal of the school is Dawn Collins.

Salamonie School was formerly a K-8 building until fall 2011, when it became solely a K-5. Since 2018, both Lancaster Elementary School and Northwest Elementary School have been closed.

== Middle schools ==
The two middle schools in HCCSC include Crestview Middle School and Riverview Middle School.

Crestview Middle School serves as the junior high school for the northern part of Huntington County. During the 2018–19 school year the enrollment was 640 students. It is rated a "B" school by the state of Indiana. The principal of the school is Rachel Yarger.

Riverview Middle School is the junior high school that serves the southern part of Huntington County. 581 students were enrolled during the 2018–19 school year. The principal is James Bragg. Wappas It is rated an "A" school by the state of Indiana.

== High school ==
There is only one high school in Huntington County Community School Corporation. It is Huntington North High School.

Huntington North High School is located in Huntington, Indiana. As of the 2018–19 school year the enrollment was 1,459 students. The principal is Russ Degitz.

== See also ==
- Indiana Department of Education
