= Indiana State Road 105 =

State highway in Indiana, United States

State Road 105
- SR 105 highlighted in red

Route information
- Maintained by INDOT
- Length: 31.934 mi (51.393 km)
- Existed: March 28, 1932–present

Major junctions
- South end: SR 9 near Banquo
- US 24 at Andrews
- North end: SR 5 / SR 14 at South Whitley

Location
- Country: United States
- State: Indiana
- Counties: Huntington, Whitley

Highway system
- Indiana State Highway System; Interstate; US; State; Scenic
← SR 104	→ SR 106

State Road 105 (SR 105) is a north–south state road in the US state of Indiana. The highway runs for about 32 miles (51 km) through Huntington and Whitley counties. The highway passes through mostly agricultural areas and short east–west section with U.S. Route 24 (US 24) near Andrews. SR 105 was first designated in early 1932 and the entire original route was paved in the early 1960s. A small reroute of SR 105 north of Andrews happened in the late 1960s.

== Route description ==
SR 105 begins at an intersection with SR 9 east of La Fontaine and runs north. The road has an intersection with SR 218 about 0.7 miles (1.1 km) north of SR 9. North of SR 218, SR 105 passes through the community of Banquo in rural southwestern Huntington County. The road has an intersection with SR 124 west of Mount Etna. The road then passes through Lost Bridge State Recreation Area and crosses over the Salamonie Lake. North of the lake SR 105 makes a sharp curve becoming east–west, before a second sharp curve that makes the road north–south once again. The road heads north towards Andrews, passing through rural farm land on the way. On the way to Andrews SR 105 takes two more sharp curves. Shortly after the curves the highway enters the town of Andrews concurrent with Main Street and passing through residential areas. Main Street crosses a Norfolk Southern rail track in the center of town. SR 105 leaves Andrews as it crosses over the Wabash River and has an intersection with US 24.

SR 105 heads southwest concurrent with US 24 as a four-lane divided highway, running roughly parallel to the Wabash River. After just over a mile SR 105 turns off of US 24 heading north towards South Whitley. On the way to South Whitley the road crosses SR 16 and passes through the community of Bippus. After Bippus the route crosses SR 114 and the Huntington–Whitley county line. In Whitley County SR 105 passes through rural farmland before entering South Whitley. On the south side of South Whitley the road curves and becomes east–west. The SR 105 designation ends at an intersection with SR 5 crossing northwest–southeast and SR 14 continuing towards the east and north concurrent with SR 5. INDOT's surveys in 2016 showed that the highest traffic levels along SR 105 were the 8,366 vehicles daily along the concurrent with US 24; the lowest counts were the 299 vehicles per day just north of US 24.

== History ==
SR 105 was first a proposed addition in early 1932 between SR 9 and South Whitley much as it does today. The state highway commission accepted SR 105, between SR 9 and the Huntington–Whitley county line into the state road system on March 28, 1932. The rest of SR 105 was added by September of that year. At its time of commissioning SR 105 had an intermediate driving surface. The entire route was paved between 1962 and 1963. Between 1966 and 1967 a short segment of road was built just north of US 24 and SR 105 was rerouted along US 24 and this new segment of roadway.

== Major intersections ==
County	Location	mi	km	Destinations	Notes
Huntington	Wayne Township	0.000	0.000	SR 9	Southern terminus of SR 105
Huntington	Wayne Township	0.693	1.115	SR 218	
Huntington	Wayne Township	5.735	9.230	SR 124	
Huntington	Dallas Township	16.043	25.819	US 24 east – Huntington	Eastern end of US 24 concurrency
Huntington	Dallas Township	17.186	27.658	US 24 west	Western end of US 24 concurrency
Huntington	Dallas Township	20.738	33.375	SR 16	
Huntington	Warren Township	26.776	43.092	SR 114	
Whitley	South Whitley	31.934	51.393	SR 5 / SR 14	Northern terminus of SR 105
1.000 mi = 1.609 km; 1.000 km = 0.621 mi: Concurrency terminus
