= Browns Corner =

Browns Corner or Brown's Corners may refer to:

- Browns Corner, Indiana
- Browns Corner, Virginia (disambiguation), multiple locations
- Browns Corner, West Virginia
- Brown's Corners, Ontario (disambiguation), several places in Canada
