= Roanoke =

Roanoke /ˈroʊ.ənoʊk/ may refer to:

== Places ==
- Roanoke Colony, a former English colony that mysteriously disappeared
- Roanoke Island, the location of the Roanoke colony in present-day North Carolina
- Roanoke River, flowing through Virginia and North Carolina and emptying into Albemarle Sound near Roanoke Island
- Roanoke Valley, part of the Great Appalachian Valley near the headwaters of the Roanoke River in Virginia
- Roanoke, Alabama
- Roanoke, Georgia
- Roanoke, Illinois
- Roanoke, Indiana
- Roanoke, Louisiana
- Roanoke, Missouri
- Roanoke, Texas
- Roanoke, Virginia, the largest US city named Roanoke
- Roanoke County, Virginia
- Roanoke, West Virginia
- Roanoke Rapids, North Carolina
- Randolph, Virginia, formerly called Roanoke

== Other uses ==
- Roanoke tribe, a Carolina Algonquian-speaking tribe in eastern North Carolina
- Roanoke Park (Seattle), a park in Seattle, Washington
- USS Roanoke, various USN vessels named Roanoke
- Roanoke (ship), an American ship (1892–1905)
- Roanoke College, a private liberal arts college located in Salem, Virginia
- Neo Roanoke, a fictional character in Mobile Suit Gundam SEED Destiny, an anime series
- Roanoke Building, a building in Chicago, Illinois
- American Horror Story: Roanoke, the sixth season of the television series American Horror Story
- Roanoke Station (disambiguation)

== See also ==
- Rowan Oak
