= Polk Township, Huntington County, Indiana =

Polk Township
- Township
- Location in Huntington County
- Coordinates: 40°47′09″N 85°36′10″W
- Country: United States
- State: Indiana
- County: Huntington

Government
  - Type: Indiana township

Area
  - Total: 24.11 sq mi (62.4 km^{2})
  - Land: 22.76 sq mi (58.9 km^{2})
  - Water: 1.35 sq mi (3.5 km^{2}) 5.60%
- Elevation: 804 ft (245 m)

Population (2020)
  - Total: 464
  - Density: 19.7/sq mi (7.6/km^{2})
- GNIS feature ID: 0453754

Polk Township is one of 12 townships in Huntington County, Indiana, United States. As of the 2020 census, its population was 464.

== History ==
Polk Township was organized in 1846. It was named for President James K. Polk.

== Geography ==
According to the 2010 census, the township has a total area of 24.11 square miles (62.4 km^{2}), of which 22.76 square miles (58.9 km^{2}) (or 94.40%) is land and 1.35 square miles (3.5 km^{2}) (or 5.60%) is water.

=== Cities and towns ===
- Mount Etna (northwest edge)

=== Unincorporated communities ===
- Harlansburg

=== Adjacent townships ===
- Dallas Township (north)
- Huntington Township (northeast)
- Lancaster Township (east)
- Jefferson Township (southeast)
- Wayne Township (south)
- Liberty Township, Wabash County (southwest)
- Lagro Township, Wabash County (northwest)

=== Cemeteries ===
The township contains one cemetery, Monument City Memorial.

=== Major highways ===
- Indiana State Road 105
- Indiana State Road 124

== Demographics ==
Historical population
Census	Pop.	Note	%±
1890	1,010		—
1900	874		−13.5%
1910	787		−10.0%
1920	670		−14.9%
1930	575		−14.2%
1940	550		−4.3%
1950	513		−6.7%
1960	498		−2.9%
1970	390		−21.7%
1980	409		4.9%
1990	399		−2.4%
2000	491		23.1%
2010	449		−8.6%
2020	464		3.3%
US Decennial Census
