= Harlansburg =

Harlansburg may refer to:

- Harlansburg, Indiana
- Harlansburg, Pennsylvania
