= Bowerstown =

Bowerstown may refer to:

- Bowerstown, Indiana - community in Huntington County, Indiana
- Bowerstown, New Jersey - community in Warren County, New Jersey
- Bowerstown, New York - community in Otsego County, New York
