= Warren, Indiana =

- Town
- Town of Warren
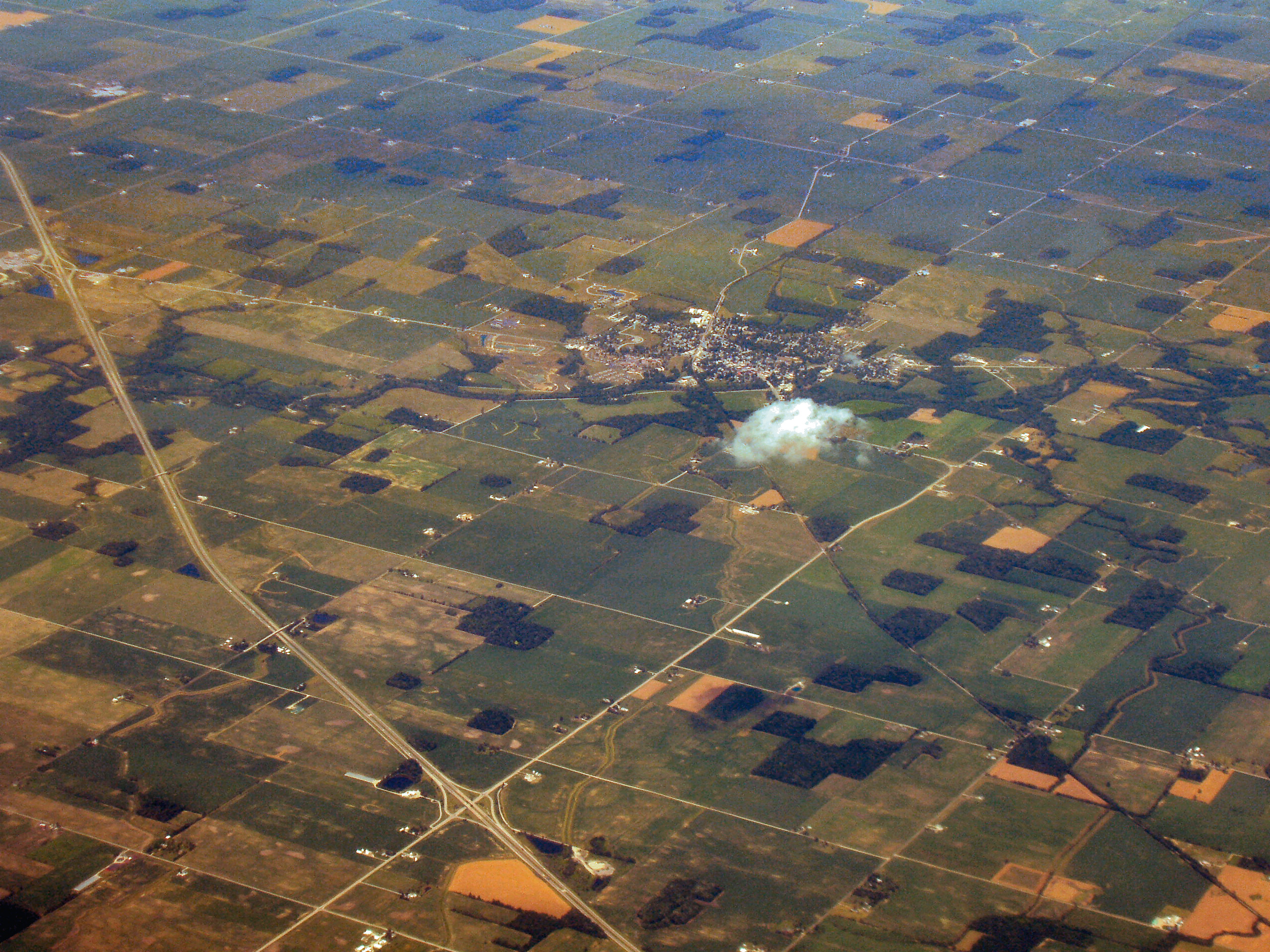
- Aerial view of Warren facing northeast

- Location of Warren in Huntington County, Indiana.
- Coordinates: 40°41′16″N 85°25′29″W
- Country: United States
- State: Indiana
- County: Huntington
- Township: Salamonie

Area
  - Total: 1.09 sq mi (2.82 km^{2})
  - Land: 1.08 sq mi (2.80 km^{2})
  - Water: 0.0039 sq mi (0.01 km^{2})
- Elevation: 833 ft (254 m)

Population (2020)
  - Total: 1,182
  - Density: 1,091.8/sq mi (421.54/km^{2})
- Time zone: UTC-5 (Eastern (EST))
  - Summer (DST): UTC-4 (EDT)
- ZIP code: 46792
- Area code: 260
- FIPS code: 18-80108
- GNIS feature ID: 2397723
- Website: warrenindiana.us

Warren is a town in Salamonie Township, Huntington County, Indiana. The population of Warren was 1,182 at the time of the 2020 census.

== History ==
Warren, originally known as "Jonesboro," was platted in 1833 near the Indianapolis & Ft. Wayne Road. In 1837, founder Samuel Jones sold his first lot. The name was later changed due to there being another town of Jonesboro nearby, south of Marion. The town experienced growth in 1878 when a new railroad line was built through the neighborhood.

== Geography ==
Warren is located along the Salamonie River. The town lies just southeast of Interstate 69 between exits 273 and 278.

According to the 2010 census, Warren has a total area of 1.145 square miles (2.97 km^{2}), of which 1.14 square miles (2.95 km^{2}) (or 99.56%) is land and 0.005 square miles (0.01 km^{2}) (or 0.44%) is water.

== Demographics ==
Historical population
Census	Pop.	Note	%±
1880	503		—
1890	1,120		122.7%
1900	1,523		36.0%
1910	1,189		−21.9%
1920	1,520		27.8%
1930	1,177		−22.6%
1940	1,388		17.9%
1950	1,247		−10.2%
1960	1,241		−0.5%
1970	1,229		−1.0%
1980	1,254		2.0%
1990	1,185		−5.5%
2000	1,272		7.3%
2010	1,239		−2.6%
2020	1,182		−4.6%
U.S. Decennial Census

=== 2010 census ===
As of the census of 2010, there were 1,239 people, 515 households, and 341 families living in the town. The population density was 1,086.8 inhabitants per square mile (419.6/km^{2}). There were 600 housing units at an average density of 526.3 per square mile (203.2/km^{2}). The racial makeup of the town was 98.8% White, 0.1% African American, 0.1% Native American, 0.2% Asian, 0.1% from other races, and 0.8% from two or more races. Hispanic or Latino of any race were 0.4% of the population.

There were 515 households, of which 29.5% had children under the age of 18 living with them, 52.2% were married couples living together, 11.3% had a female householder with no husband present, 2.7% had a male householder with no wife present, and 33.8% were non-families. 29.5% of all households were made up of individuals, and 11.6% had someone living alone who was 65 years of age or older. The average household size was 2.41 and the average family size was 2.96.

The median age in the town was 40.1 years. 24.9% of residents were under the age of 18; 8.2% were between the ages of 18 and 24; 22.6% were from 25 to 44; 25.5% were from 45 to 64; and 19% were 65 years of age or older. The gender makeup of the town was 49.4% male and 50.6% female.

=== 2000 census ===
As of the census of 2000, there were 1,272 people, 507 households, and 354 families living in the town. The population density was 1,395.1 inhabitants per square mile (538.7/km^{2}). There were 558 housing units at an average density of 612.0 per square mile (236.3/km^{2}). The racial makeup of the town was 98.82% White, 0.31% African American, 0.16% Native American, 0.08% Asian, 0.39% from other races, and 0.24% from two or more races. Hispanic or Latino of any race were 0.79% of the population.

There were 507 households, out of which 36.3% had children under the age of 18 living with them, 58.6% were married couples living together, 7.9% had a female householder with no husband present, and 30.0% were non-families. 25.8% of all households were made up of individuals, and 11.4% had someone living alone who was 65 years of age or older. The average household size was 2.51 and the average family size was 3.03.

In the town, the population was spread out, with 28.4% under the age of 18, 6.4% from 18 to 24, 28.6% from 25 to 44, 21.7% from 45 to 64, and 14.9% who were 65 years of age or older. The median age was 37 years. For every 100 females, there were 92.4 males. For every 100 females age 18 and over, there were 90.2 males.

The median income for a household in the town was $38,550, and the median income for a family was $41,917. Males had a median income of $33,229 versus $21,821 for females. The per capita income for the town was $17,145. About 2.0% of families and 3.1% of the population were below the poverty line, including 2.3% of those under age 18 and 8.1% of those age 65 or over.

== Education ==
The Huntington County Community School Corporation operates Salamonie School, a K-5 school which is the only remaining school in Warren. The former Salamonie Township High School was consolidated into Huntington County Community High School, now known as Huntington North High School, in 1966. Warren Elementary School operated in the old high school building for many years, its basketball team having adopted the old high school's nickname; "Lightning 5." However, the school was eventually closed and the nickname retired. The building served as the Knight Civic Center until the name was changed to its current name the "Knight Bergman Center".

The town has a lending library, the Warren Public Library.

== Notable people ==
- Phyllis Pond, American educator and politician was born in Warren.
- John C. Rule, American educator and historian was born in Warren.

== Transportation ==
Important highways in Warren:

- State Road 5
- State Road 218

== Points of interest ==
- Heritage Pointe
- Pulse Opera House
- Knight Civic Center
- USS Salamonie Museum
- Salamonie Valley Museum
