= Huntington County TAB =

Newspaper in Indiana, US

- Type: semi-weekly
- Format: local community
- Publisher: Russ Grindle & Scott Trauner
- Editor: Cindy Klepper
- Headquarters: 1670 Etna Ave Huntington, IN 46750
- City: Huntington, Indiana
- Country: United States
- Circulation: 15,000

The Huntington County TAB is a free local community newspaper based in Huntington, Indiana US. It covers local community news with a circulation of 15,000 in rural Huntington County. The Huntington County TAB has reported on the nation's only museum and learning center dedicated to Vice Presidents. The Quayle Vice Presidential Learning Center covers all Vice Presidents but highlights all of Indiana's six Vice Presidents including Huntington's own Dan Quayle.

== Founding ==
The paper was founded in 1985 as a free weekly. It later became a semi-weekly publication and still remained free. In December 2008, the newspaper launched its online platform.
