= Lancaster Township, Huntington County, Indiana =

Lancaster Township
- Township
- Location in Huntington County
- Coordinates: 40°46′36″N 85°30′18″W
- Country: United States
- State: Indiana
- County: Huntington

Government
  - Type: Indiana township

Area
  - Total: 35.89 sq mi (93.0 km^{2})
  - Land: 35.63 sq mi (92.3 km^{2})
  - Water: 0.27 sq mi (0.70 km^{2}) 0.75%
- Elevation: 801 ft (244 m)

Population (2020)
  - Total: 1,130
  - Density: 31.7/sq mi (12.2/km^{2})
- GNIS feature ID: 0453538

Lancaster Township is one of twelve townships in Huntington County, Indiana, United States. As of the 2020 census, its population was 1,130 (down from 1,150 at 2010) and it contained 477 housing units.

== History ==
Lancaster Township was founded in 1837.

== Geography ==
According to the 2010 census, the township has a total area of 35.89 square miles (93.0 km^{2}), of which 35.63 square miles (92.3 km^{2}) (or 99.28%) is land and 0.27 square miles (0.70 km^{2}) (or 0.75%) is water.

=== Cities and towns ===
- Mount Etna (northeast half)

=== Unincorporated towns ===
- Harlansburg
- Lancaster
- Majenica

=== Extinct towns ===
- River

=== Adjacent townships ===
- Huntington Township (north)
- Union Township (northeast)
- Rock Creek Township (east)
- Salamonie Township (southeast)
- Jefferson Township (south)
- Wayne Township (southwest)
- Polk Township (west)
- Dallas Township (northwest)

=== Cemeteries ===
The township contains three cemeteries: German Settlement, Loon Creek and Rees.

=== Major highways ===
- Indiana State Road 5
- Indiana State Road 37
- Indiana State Road 124
