= Warren Township, Huntington County, Indiana =

Warren Township
- Township
- Location in Huntington County
- Coordinates: 40°57′36″N 85°36′34″W
- Country: United States
- State: Indiana
- County: Huntington

Government
  - Type: Indiana township

Area
  - Total: 24.4 sq mi (63 km^{2})
  - Land: 24.32 sq mi (63.0 km^{2})
  - Water: 0.08 sq mi (0.21 km^{2}) 0.33%
- Elevation: 850 ft (260 m)

Population (2020)
  - Total: 641
  - Density: 27.6/sq mi (10.7/km^{2})
- GNIS feature ID: 0453975

Warren Township is one of 12 townships in Huntington County, Indiana, United States. As of the 2020 census, its population was 641.

== History ==
Warren Township was organized in 1843.

== Geography ==
According to the 2010 census, the township has a total area of 24.4 square miles (63 km^{2}), of which 24.32 square miles (63.0 km^{2}) (or 99.67%) is land and 0.08 square miles (0.21 km^{2}) (or 0.33%) is water.

=== Unincorporated towns ===
- Bippus
- Bracken
- Luther
- Makin

=== Adjacent townships ===
- Cleveland Township, Whitley County (north)
- Washington Township, Whitley County (northeast)
- Clear Creek Township (east)
- Huntington Township (southeast)
- Dallas Township (south)
- Lagro Township, Wabash County (southwest)
- Chester Township, Wabash County (west)

=== Cemeteries ===
The township contains two cemeteries: Funk and Saint Johns.

=== Major highways ===
- Indiana State Road 5
- Indiana State Road 16
- Indiana State Road 105
- Indiana State Road 113
- Indiana State Road 114

== Notable person ==
- Chris Schenkel, Emmy Award winning sportscaster

== Demographics ==
Historical population
Census	Pop.	Note	%±
1890	1,267		—
1900	1,084		−14.4%
1910	1,100		1.5%
1920	1,000		−9.1%
1930	815		−18.5%
1940	820		0.6%
1950	785		−4.3%
1960	757		−3.6%
1970	806		6.5%
1980	759		−5.8%
1990	717		−5.5%
2000	730		1.8%
2010	672		−7.9%
2020	641		−4.6%
US Decennial Census
