= Huntington Township, Huntington County, Indiana =

Huntington Township
- Township
- Location in Huntington County
- Coordinates: 40°52′22″N 85°30′46″W
- Country: United States
- State: Indiana
- County: Huntington

Government
  - Type: Indiana township

Area
  - Total: 37.26 sq mi (96.5 km^{2})
  - Land: 36.46 sq mi (94.4 km^{2})
  - Water: 0.8 sq mi (2.1 km^{2}) 2.15%
- Elevation: 712 ft (217 m)

Population (2020)
  - Total: 20,326
  - Density: 571.5/sq mi (220.7/km^{2})
- GNIS feature ID: 0453424
- Website: huntingtontownship.org

Huntington Township is one of twelve townships in Huntington County, Indiana. As of the 2020 census, its population was 20,326, making it the most populous township in the county.

Huntington Township was organized in 1834.

== History ==
The Chief Richardville House and Miami Treaty Grounds and Rangeline Road Bridge are listed on the National Register of Historic Places.

== Geography ==
According to the 2010 census, the township has a total area of 37.26 square miles (96.5 km^{2}), of which 36.46 square miles (94.4 km^{2}) (or 97.85%) is land and 0.8 square miles (2.1 km^{2}) (or 2.15%) is water. Lakes in the township include Big Blue, Lake Clare, and the J. Edward Roush Reservoir. The stream of Rabbit Run runs through the township.

=== Cities and towns ===
- Huntington (the county seat)

=== Adjacent townships ===
- Clear Creek Township (north)
- Jackson Township (northeast)
- Union Township (east)
- Rock Creek Township (southeast)
- Lancaster Township (south)
- Polk Township (southwest)
- Dallas Township (west)
- Warren Township (northwest)

=== Cemeteries ===
The township contains four cemeteries: Mount Calvary, Mount Hope, Pilgrims Rest and Pleasant Grove.

=== Major highways ===
- U.S. Route 24
- U.S. Route 224
- Indiana State Road 5
- Indiana State Road 9
- Indiana State Road 16

=== Airports and landing strips ===
- Bowling Airport
- Huntington Municipal Airport

== Education ==
Huntington Township is the home of Huntington University, a Christian liberal arts college with an enrollment of approximately 1,100.

Huntington Township is also home to Huntington North High School, Crestview Middle School, Riverview Middle School, Huntington Catholic School, Flint Springs Elementary School, Lincoln Elementary School, and Horace Mann Elementary School.

Huntington Township residents may obtain a free library card from the Huntington City-Township Public Library in Downtown Huntington.

== Notable people ==
- J. Danforth Quayle, Vice President of the United States, U.S. Senator, U.S. Representative
- J. Edward Roush, U.S. Representative, father of "911 Emergency System"

== Points of interest ==
- Huntington County Historical Museum
- Huntington University Arboretum and Botanical Garden
- Huntington University
- J. Edward Roush Lake
- Merillat Centre for the Arts
- Sheets Wildlife Museum and Learning Center
- Sunken Gardens
- The Forks Of The Wabash
- The Indiana Room Genealogy Center
- United States Vice Presidential Museum
- Victory Noll

== Demographics ==
Historical population
| Census | Pop. | Note | %± |
|---|---|---|---|
| 1890 | 9,319 | | — |
| 1900 | 11,730 | | 25.9% |
| 1910 | 12,483 | | 6.4% |
| 1920 | 16,568 | | 32.7% |
| 1930 | 15,938 | | −3.8% |
| 1940 | 16,368 | | 2.7% |
| 1950 | 17,900 | | 9.4% |
| 1960 | 19,448 | | 8.6% |
| 1970 | 20,204 | | 3.9% |
| 1980 | 20,032 | | −0.9% |
| 1990 | 20,236 | | 1.0% |
| 2000 | 21,262 | | 5.1% |
| 2010 | 20,837 | | −2.0% |
| 2020 | 20,326 | | −2.5% |
US Decennial Census
