= Lancaster, Huntington County, Indiana =

- Unincorporated community
- Location within Indiana Location within the United States
- Coordinates: 40°44′56″N 85°30′25″W
- Country: United States
- State: Indiana
- County: Huntington
- Township: Lancaster
- Elevation: 804 ft (245 m)
- ZIP code: 46792
- FIPS code: 18-41886
- GNIS feature ID: 437591

Lancaster is an unincorporated community in Lancaster Township, Huntington County, Indiana.

== History ==
Lancaster, originally named New Lancaster, was laid out and platted in 1836.
