= Pleasant Plain, Indiana =

- Unincorporated community
- Location within Indiana Location within the United States
- Coordinates: 40°41′48″N 85°32′43″W
- Country: United States
- State: Indiana
- County: Huntington
- Township: Jefferson
- Elevation: 837 ft (255 m)
- ZIP code: 46792
- FIPS code: 18-60570
- GNIS feature ID: 449712

Pleasant Plain is an unincorporated community in Jefferson Township, Huntington County, Indiana.

== History ==
Pleasant Plain was founded in 1875. It was likely named due to its scenic setting. A post office was established at Pleasant Plain in 1875, and remained in operation until it was discontinued in 1905.
