= Salamonie Township, Huntington County, Indiana =

Salamonie Township
- Township
- Location in Huntington County
- Coordinates: 40°41′27″N 85°23′23″W
- Country: United States
- State: Indiana
- County: Huntington

Government
  - Type: Indiana township

Area
  - Total: 36.49 sq mi (94.5 km^{2})
  - Land: 36.3 sq mi (94 km^{2})
  - Water: 0.19 sq mi (0.49 km^{2}) 0.52%
- Elevation: 876 ft (267 m)

Population (2020)
  - Total: 2,260
  - Density: 56.4/sq mi (21.8/km^{2})
- GNIS feature ID: 0453822

Salamonie Township is one of twelve townships in Huntington County, Indiana, United States. As of the 2020 census, its population was 2,260.

== History ==
Salamonie Township was organized in 1835. It was named from the Salamonie River.

== Geography ==
According to the 2010 census, the township has a total area of 36.49 square miles (94.5 km^{2}), of which 36.3 square miles (94 km^{2}) (or 99.48%) is land and 0.19 square miles (0.49 km^{2}) (or 0.52%) is water. The stream of Weasel Creek runs through this township.

=== Cities and towns ===
- Warren

=== Unincorporated towns ===
- Buckeye

=== Adjacent townships ===
- Rock Creek Township (north)
- Rockcreek Township, Wells County (northeast)
- Liberty Township, Wells County (east)
- Chester Township, Wells County (southeast)
- Jackson Township, Wells County (south)
- Van Buren Township, Grant County (southwest)
- Jefferson Township (west)
- Lancaster Township (northwest)

=== Cemeteries ===
The township contains eight cemeteries: Woodlawn, Masonic, Spring Hill, Mitchell, Red Men, Thompson Home, West Union, and Good-Jones.

=== Major highways ===
- Interstate 69
- State Road 3
- State Road 5
- State Road 124
- State Road 218

== Education ==
Salamonie township contains one elementary school: Salamonie School.

Salamonie Township residents may obtain a free library card from the Warren Public Library in Warren.

== Demographics ==
Historical population
Census	Pop.	Note	%±
1890	2,346		—
1900	3,152		34.4%
1910	2,665		−15.5%
1920	2,547		−4.4%
1930	2,029		−20.3%
1940	2,291		12.9%
1950	2,268		−1.0%
1960	2,515		10.9%
1970	2,513		−0.1%
1980	2,018		−19.7%
1990	2,404		19.1%
2000	2,529		5.2%
2010	2,049		−19.0%
2020	2,260		10.3%
US Decennial Census
