= Rock Creek Township, Huntington County, Indiana =

Rock Creek Township
- Township
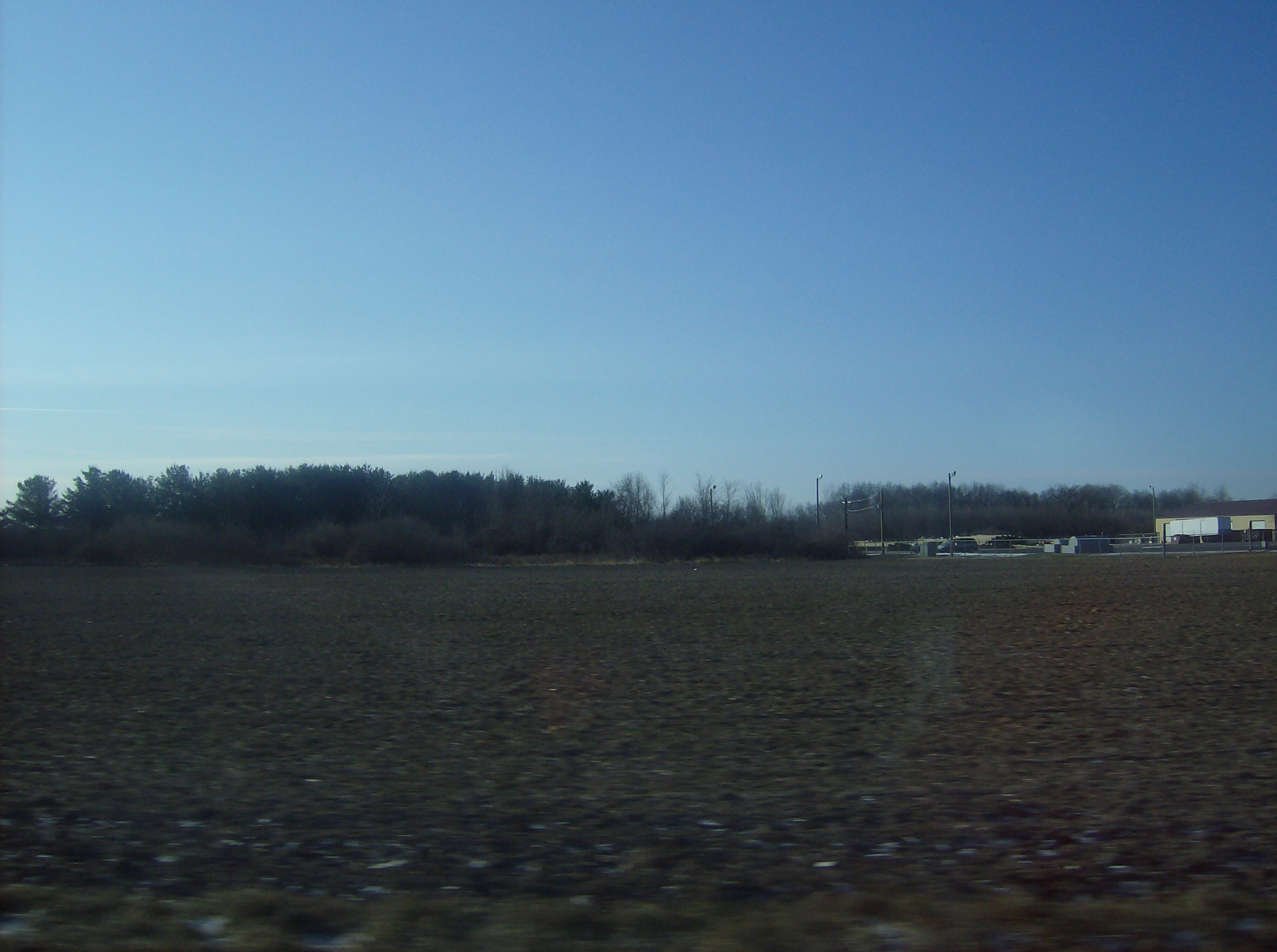
- Countryside in Rock Creek Township

- Location in Huntington County
- Coordinates: 40°47′03″N 85°23′48″W
- Country: United States
- State: Indiana
- County: Huntington

Government
  - Type: Indiana township

Area
  - Total: 36.84 sq mi (95.4 km^{2})
  - Land: 36.41 sq mi (94.3 km^{2})
  - Water: 0.43 sq mi (1.1 km^{2}) 1.17%
- Elevation: 823 ft (251 m)

Population (2020)
  - Total: 1,272
  - Density: 37.1/sq mi (14.3/km^{2})
- GNIS feature ID: 0453810

Rock Creek Township is one of twelve townships in Huntington County, Indiana, United States. As of the 2020 census, its population was 1,272.

== History ==
Rock Creek Township was organized in 1842. It was named from Rock Creek, in the eastern part.

== Geography ==
According to the 2010 census, the township has a total area of 36.84 square miles (95.4 km^{2}), of which 36.41 square miles (94.3 km^{2}) (or 98.83%) is land and 0.43 square miles (1.1 km^{2}) (or 1.17%) is water.

=== Cities and towns ===
- Markle (southwest half)

=== Unincorporated towns ===
- Browns Corner
- Plum Tree
- Rock Creek Center

(This list is based on USGS data and may include former settlements.)

=== Adjacent townships ===
- Union Township (north)
- Union Township, Wells County (northeast)
- Rockcreek Township, Wells County (east)
- Liberty Township, Wells County (southeast)
- Salamonie Township (south)
- Jefferson Township (southwest)
- Lancaster Township (west)
- Huntington Township (northwest)

=== Cemeteries ===
The township contains three cemeteries: Barnes, Star of Hope and Yankeetown.

=== Major highways ===
- Interstate 69
- U.S. Route 224
- State Road 3
- State Road 5
- State Road 116

== Demographics ==
Historical population
Census	Pop.	Note	%±
1890	2,081		—
1900	2,070		−0.5%
1910	1,992		−3.8%
1920	1,695		−14.9%
1930	1,467		−13.5%
1940	1,571		7.1%
1950	1,614		2.7%
1960	1,660		2.9%
1970	1,564		−5.8%
1980	1,463		−6.5%
1990	1,471		0.5%
2000	1,417		−3.7%
2010	1,350		−4.7%
2020	1,272		−5.8%
US Decennial Census
