= John and Minerva Kline Farm =

- U.S. National Register of Historic Places
- U.S. Historic district
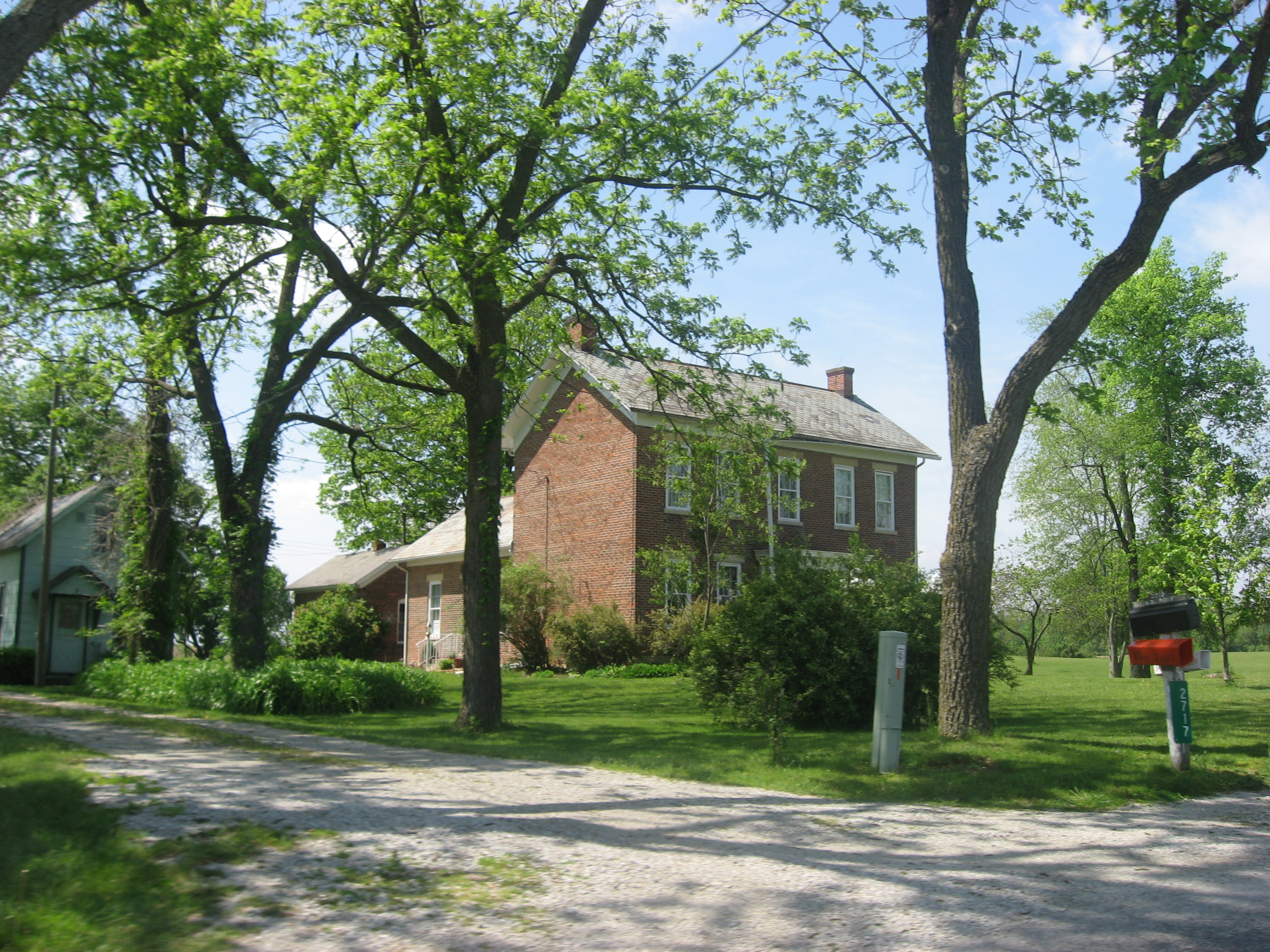
- John and Minerva Kline Farmhouse, May 2012

- Location within Indiana Location within the United States
- Location: 2717 E. 400N, east of Huntington in Union Township, Huntington County, Indiana
- Coordinates: 40°53′19″N 85°23′59″W
- Area: 5.6 acres (2.3 ha)
- Built: 1865
- Architectural style: Greek Revival, English barn
- NRHP reference No.: 88003038
- Added to NRHP: December 22, 1988

John and Minerva Kline Farm, also known as Kline Farmstead, is a historic home and farm and national historic district located in Union Township, Huntington County, Indiana. The farmhouse was built in 1865, and is a two-story, five-bay, Greek Revival style brick I-house with a 1 1/2-story rear ell. It has a slate gable roof and small wooden front porch with square posts and pilasters. Also on the property the contributing summer house (c. 1865), tenant house, English barn, drive-in crib barn, pump house, livestock barn, chicken house, and a variety of landscape features.

It was listed on the National Register of Historic Places in 1988.
