= Plum Tree, Indiana =

- Unincorporated community
- Location within Indiana Location within the United States
- Coordinates: 40°44′32″N 85°23′33″W
- Country: United States
- State: Indiana
- County: Huntington
- Township: Rock Creek
- Elevation: 853 ft (260 m)
- ZIP code: 46792
- FIPS code: 18-60804
- GNIS feature ID: 441372

Plum Tree is an unincorporated community in Rock Creek Township, Huntington County, Indiana.

== History ==
Never officially platted, Plum Tree took its name from a large, wild plum tree. A post office was established at Plum Tree in 1876, and remained in operation until it was discontinued in 1893.
