= Bracken, Indiana =

- Unincorporated community
- Location within Indiana Location within the United States
- Coordinates: 40°59′12″N 85°37′26″W
- Country: United States
- State: Indiana
- County: Huntington
- Township: Warren
- Elevation: 876 ft (267 m)
- ZIP code: 46750
- FIPS code: 18-06940
- GNIS feature ID: 431433

Bracken is an unincorporated community in Warren Township, Huntington County, Indiana.

Bracken, formerly called Claysville, was founded in the 1850s.
