= Milo, Indiana =

- Unincorporated community
- Location within Indiana Location within the United States
- Coordinates: 40°39′14″N 85°28′06″W
- Country: United States
- State: Indiana
- County: Huntington
- Township: Jefferson
- Elevation: 843 ft (257 m)
- ZIP code: 46991
- FIPS code: 18-49770
- GNIS feature ID: 439253

Milo is an unincorporated community in Jefferson Township, Huntington County, Indiana.

== History ==
Milo was never properly laid out or platted. A post office called Milo was established in 1881, and remained in operation until it was discontinued in 1923. Milo M. Sharp was an early postmaster.

Milo was a station and shipping point on the Clover Leaf Railroad.
