= Rock Creek Center, Indiana =

Unincorporated community in Indiana, U.S.

Coordinates: 40°47′08″N 85°23′33″W

Rock Creek Center is an unincorporated community in Huntington County, Indiana, in the United States.

== History ==
Rock Creek Center was so named from its position near the geographical center of Rock Creek Township. A post office called Rock Creek opened in 1874, and closed in 1902.
