= Mahon, Indiana =

- Unincorporated community
- Location within Indiana Location within the United States
- Coordinates: 40°56′19″N 85°22′50″W
- Country: United States
- State: Indiana
- County: Huntington
- Township: Jackson
- Elevation: 755 ft (230 m)
- ZIP code: 46750
- FIPS code: 18-46224
- GNIS feature ID: 438478

Mahon is an unincorporated community in Jackson Township, Huntington County, Indiana.

== History ==
Mahon was laid out and platted in 1853, not long after the Wabash and Erie Canal was extended to that point. It was named for its founder, Archibald Mahon.

A post office was established at Mahon in 1853, and remained in operation until it was discontinued in 1867.
