= Rangeline Road Bridge =

- U.S. National Register of Historic Places
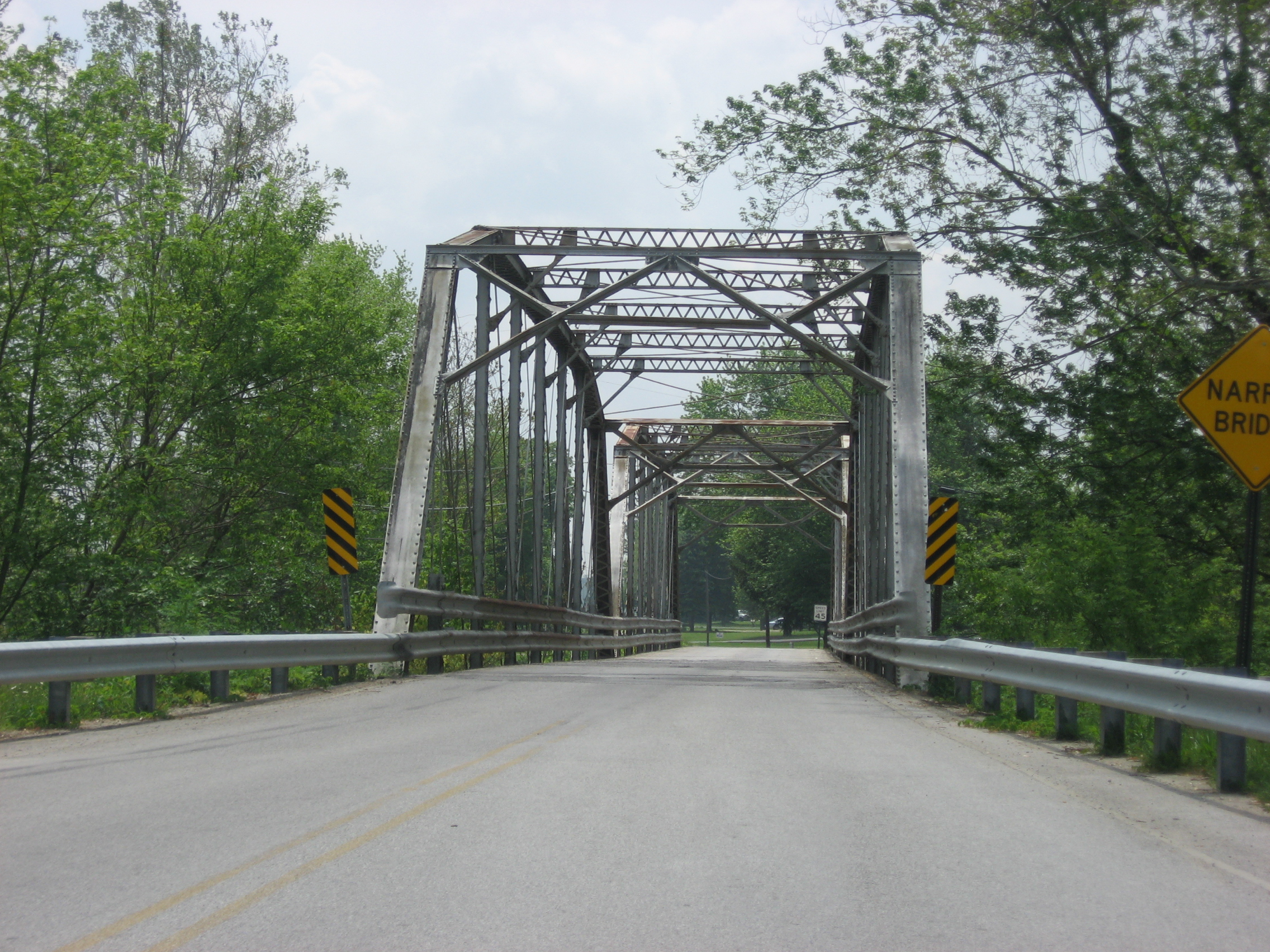
- Rangeline Road Bridge, May 2012

- Location within Indiana Location within the United States
- Location: County Road 475W over the Wabash River, west of Huntington in Huntington Township, Huntington County, Indiana
- Coordinates: 40°52′45″N 85°32′34″W
- Area: less than one acre
- Built: 1913
- Built by: Lafayette Engineering Co.
- Architectural style: Camelback Through
- NRHP reference No.: 98000306
- Added to NRHP: April 3, 1998

Rangeline Road Bridge is a historic Camelback Through Truss bridge that spans the Wabash River in Huntington Township, Huntington County, Indiana. It was built in 1913 by the Lafayette Engineering Co. of Lafayette, Indiana. It consists of two steel truss spans, each 128 feet long and 21 feet deep at mid-span.

It was listed on the National Register of Historic Places in 1998.
