= Jefferson Township, Huntington County, Indiana =

Jefferson Township
- Township
- Location in Huntington County
- Coordinates: 40°42′14″N 85°30′42″W
- Country: United States
- State: Indiana
- County: Huntington

Government
  - Type: Indiana township

Area
  - Total: 36.2 sq mi (94 km^{2})
  - Land: 35.94 sq mi (93.1 km^{2})
  - Water: 0.26 sq mi (0.67 km^{2}) 0.72%
- Elevation: 846 ft (258 m)

Population (2020)
  - Total: 744
  - Density: 20.7/sq mi (7.99/km^{2})
- GNIS feature ID: 0453487

Jefferson Township is one of twelve townships in Huntington County, Indiana, United States. As of the 2020 census, its population was 744 (down from 757 at 2010) and it contained 315 housing units.

== History ==
Jefferson Township was organized in 1843. It was named for President Thomas Jefferson.

== Geography ==
According to the 2010 census, the township has a total area of 36.2 square miles (94 km^{2}), of which 35.94 square miles (93.1 km^{2}) (or 99.28%) is land and 0.26 square miles (0.67 km^{2}) (or 0.72%) is water.

=== Cities and towns ===
- Mount Etna (southeast quarter)

=== Unincorporated towns ===
- Milo
- Pleasant Plain

=== Adjacent townships ===
- Lancaster Township (north)
- Rock Creek Township (northeast)
- Salamonie Township (east)
- Jackson Township, Wells County (southeast)
- Van Buren Township, Grant County (south)
- Washington Township, Grant County (southwest)
- Wayne Township (west)
- Polk Township (northwest)

=== Cemeteries ===
The township contains two cemeteries: Purviance and Taylor.

=== Major highways ===
- Interstate 69
- State Road 5
- State Road 124
- State Road 218
