= Browns Corner, Indiana =

Unincorporated community in Indiana, U.S.

Coordinates: 40°48′54″N 85°24′42″W

Browns Corner is an unincorporated community in Rock Creek Township, Huntington County, Indiana, in the United States.

== History ==
Browns Corner had its start as a trading post for the surrounding community. A post office was established as Brown's Corners in 1870, and it was renamed Browns Corner in 1893. The post office was once again renamed Toledo in 1893, and remained in operation until it was discontinued in 1901.
