= Union Township, Huntington County, Indiana =

Union Township
- Township
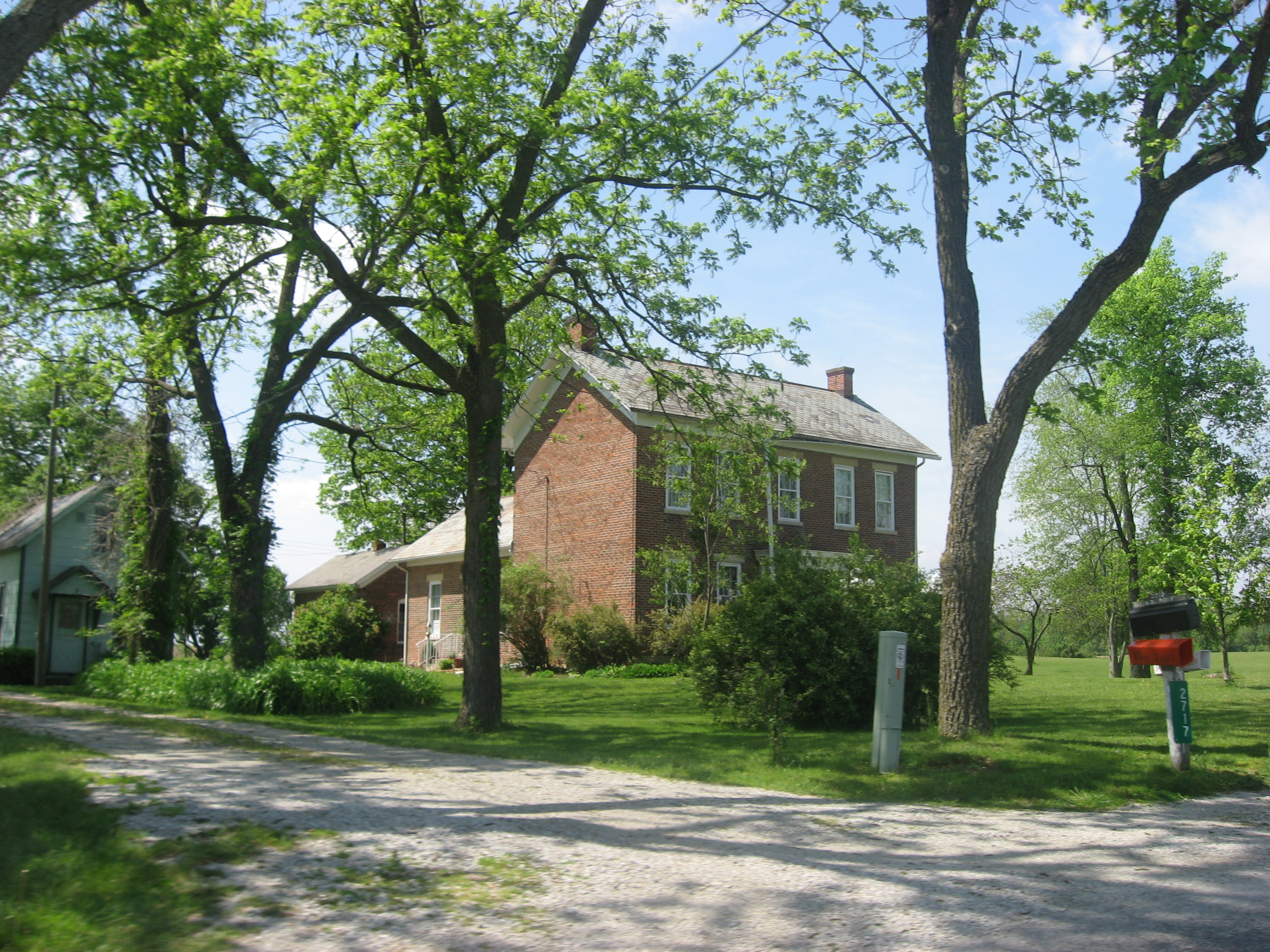
- A historic farmstead in Union Township

- Location in Huntington County
- Coordinates: 40°52′27″N 85°23′33″W
- Country: United States
- State: Indiana
- County: Huntington

Government
  - Type: Indiana township

Area
  - Total: 36.39 sq mi (94.2 km^{2})
  - Land: 35.72 sq mi (92.5 km^{2})
  - Water: 0.68 sq mi (1.8 km^{2}) 1.87%
- Elevation: 791 ft (241 m)

Population (2020)
  - Total: 1,205
  - Density: 34.6/sq mi (13.4/km^{2})
- GNIS feature ID: 0453919

Union Township is one of twelve townships in Huntington County, Indiana, United States. As of the 2020 census, its population was 1,205.

== History ==
Union Township was originally called Monroe Township, and under the latter name was organized in 1842. It was renamed Union Township in 1845.

The John and Minerva Kline Farm was listed on the National Register of Historic Places in 1988.

== Geography ==
According to the 2010 census, the township has a total area of 36.39 square miles (94.2 km^{2}), of which 35.72 square miles (92.5 km^{2}) (or 98.16%) is land and 0.68 square miles (1.8 km^{2}) (or 1.87%) is water.

=== Cities and towns ===
- Huntington (portion)
- Markle (portion)

=== Unincorporated towns ===
- Bowerstown
- Mardenis
- Simpson

=== Adjacent townships ===
- Jackson Township (north)
- Lafayette Township, Allen County (northeast)
- Union Township, Wells County (east)
- Rockcreek Township, Wells County (southeast)
- Rock Creek Township (south)
- Lancaster Township (southwest)
- Huntington Township (west)
- Clear Creek Township (northwest)

=== Cemeteries ===
Feighner Cemetery is a family cemetery that was founded in 1871 by the Feighner, Haney, Shriner, Plasterer, Smith and Branstator families and is still maintained by the Branstator family today (2019). It contains, as of 2019, 82 individuals. https://lck993.wixsite.com/feighner-cemetery

=== Major highways ===
- Interstate 69
- U.S. Route 24
- U.S. Route 224

== Demographics ==
Historical population
Census	Pop.	Note	%±
1890	1,552		—
1900	1,427		−8.1%
1910	1,314		−7.9%
1920	1,185		−9.8%
1930	1,120		−5.5%
1940	1,099		−1.9%
1950	1,020		−7.2%
1960	1,125		10.3%
1970	1,037		−7.8%
1980	1,120		8.0%
1990	1,174		4.8%
2000	1,308		11.4%
2010	1,235		−5.6%
2020	1,205		−2.4%
US Decennial Census
