= Makin, Indiana =

- Unincorporated community
- Location within Indiana Location within the United States
- Coordinates: 40°57′57″N 85°35′08″W
- Country: United States
- State: Indiana
- County: Huntington
- Township: Warren
- Elevation: 853 ft (260 m)
- ZIP code: 46750
- FIPS code: 18-46275
- GNIS feature ID: 438495

Makin is an unincorporated community in Warren Township, Huntington County, Indiana.

== History ==
Makin was never properly laid out or platted. A post office was established at Makin in 1882, and remained in operation until it was discontinued in 1902. Abraham S. Makin served as an early postmaster.
