= Dallas Township, Huntington County, Indiana =

Dallas Township
- Township
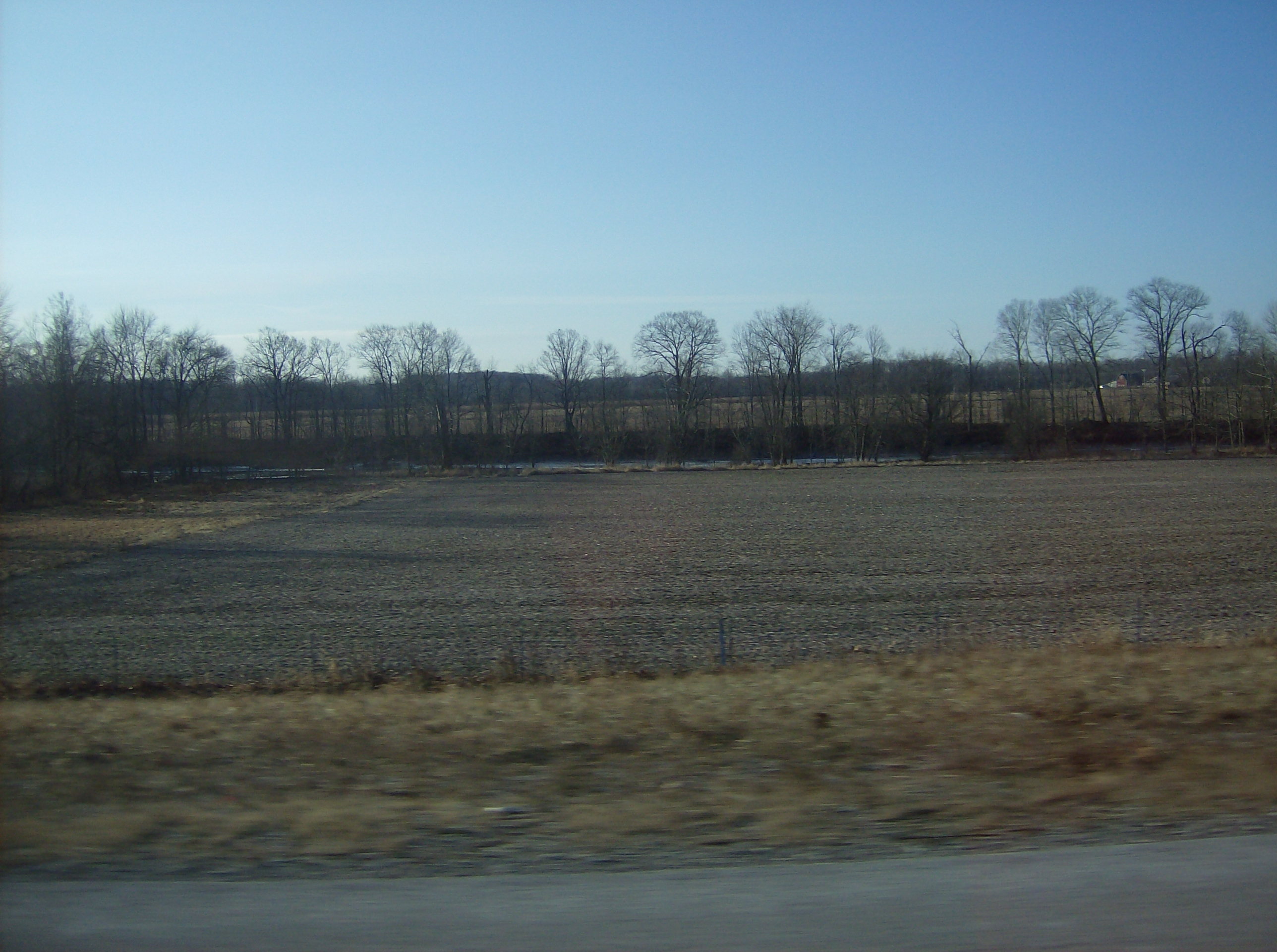
- Along the Wabash River in eastern Dallas Township

- Location in Huntington County
- Coordinates: 40°52′05″N 85°36′06″W
- Country: United States
- State: Indiana
- County: Huntington

Government
  - Type: Indiana township

Area
  - Total: 22.97 sq mi (59.5 km^{2})
  - Land: 22.67 sq mi (58.7 km^{2})
  - Water: 0.3 sq mi (0.78 km^{2}) 1.31%
- Elevation: 699 ft (213 m)

Population (2020)
  - Total: 2,041
  - Density: 90.03/sq mi (34.76/km^{2})
- GNIS feature ID: 0453251

Dallas Township is one of 12 townships in Huntington County, Indiana, United States. As of the 2020 census, its population was 2,041 (down from 2,114 at 2010) and it contained 890 housing units.

== History ==
Dallas Township was organized in 1847. It was named for Vice President George M. Dallas.

== Geography ==
According to the 2010 census, the township has a total area of 22.97 square miles (59.5 km^{2}), of which 22.67 square miles (58.7 km^{2}) (or 98.69%) is land and 0.3 square miles (0.78 km^{2}) (or 1.31%) is water. The Wabash River flows through Dallas Township.

=== Cities and towns ===
- Andrews

=== Adjacent townships ===
- Warren Township (north)
- Clear Creek Township (northeast)
- Huntington Township (east)
- Lancaster Township (southeast)
- Polk Township (south)
- Lagro Township, Wabash County (west)

=== Cemeteries ===
The township contains two cemeteries: Maple Grove and Riverside.

=== Major highways ===
- U.S. Route 24
- Indiana State Road 16
- Indiana State Road 105

== Education ==
Dallas Township residents may obtain a free library card from the Andrews-Dallas Township Public Library in Andrews.
