= Indiana State Road 218 =

Highway in Indiana

State Road 218
- SR 218 highlighted in red

Route information
- Maintained by INDOT
- Length: 91.269 mi (146.883 km)
- Existed: March 28, 1932–present

Western segment
- Length: 41.382 mi (66.598 km)
- West end: Old SR 25 near Delphi
- Major intersections: SR 25 near Delphi; US 35 in Walton; US 31 in Bunker Hill
- East end: SR 19 in Santa Fe

Eastern segment
- Length: 49.887 mi (80.285 km)
- West end: SR 15 in La Fontaine
- Major intersections: I-69 near Warren; US 27 in Berne
- East end: SR 707 near Chattanooga, OH

Location
- Country: United States
- State: Indiana
- Counties: Carroll, Cass, Miami, Wabash, Huntington, Wells, Adams

Highway system
- Indiana State Highway System; Interstate; US; State; Scenic
← SR 213	→ US 224

State Road 218 (SR 218) is an east–west state road, that consists of two discontinuous sections, in the northern part of the US state of Indiana. The western segment of SR 218 is just under 41.4 miles (66.6 km) long and connects Old State Road 25 with SR 19. The eastern portion runs from SR 15 and the Ohio state line; it is approximately 50 miles (80 km) long. The road passes through a few small towns or small cities and passes through mostly rural agriculture land. In it entire length SR 218 passes through seven counties while covering over 91 miles (146 km).

The first state road designation along modern SR 218 was SR 118 commissioned in the early 1930s along the route between SR 5 and the Ohio state line. Within the next few years SR 218 was added to the state road system along its modern route between SR 9 and SR 5, followed very soon after with the section of road between U.S. Highway 31 (US 31) and SR 21, now SR 19 being added to the state road system. The western segment was extended west to SR 25 by the late 1930s. By the early 1950s the segment of road between SR 15 and SR 9 was added to the state road system. The road near Grissom Air Reserve Base was moved onto its modern route, north of the base, by the late 1950s. By the mid-1960s SR 218 was extended east to the Ohio state line replacing SR 118.

== Route description ==
=== Western segment ===
SR 218 designation begins as an unsigned state road, at an intersection with Old SR 25, in rural Carroll County. The unsigned section of SR 218 heads southeasterly before having an intersection with SR 25. At this intersection SR 218 designation becomes signed and continues towards the southeast. While heading southeast the road crosses a railroad track before bending to become east–west. SR 218 passes through agricultural land on its way to Camden, while in Camden SR 218 passes through an intersection with the northern terminus of SR 75, in downtown Camden. East of Camden SR 218 passes through farm and fields, turning north concurrent with SR 29. The concurrency head north passing through Deer Creek before SR 218 turns east, while SR 29 continues north.

The road leaves Carroll County and enters Cass County before passing through Walton and an intersection with US 35. The road leaves Cass County and enters Miami County, passing north of the Grissom Air Reserve Base. SR 218 turns south concurrent with US 31, passing east of Grissom Air Reserve Base, before SR 218 turns east, while US 31 continues south. After US 31 SR 218 enters Bunker Hill, making several sharp turns with in the town. Past Bunker Hill the road heads east passes through rural Miami County, before turning to become north–south for about half a mile. The road curves again to become east–west, before a curve where the road becomes north–south. Soon after becoming north–south the western segment of SR 218 end at an intersection with SR 19, near Santa Fe.

=== Eastern segment ===
The eastern segment begins at an intersection with SR 15, on the south edge of La Fontaine. SR 218 heads east passing through farmland in rural Wabash County. The road enters Huntington County and passes through a rural intersection with SR 105, followed soon after by an intersection with SR 9. Past SR 9, SR 218 has a concurrency with SR 5, the concurrency has an interchange with Interstate 69, before bending to become north–south. Soon after becoming north–south the road bends again to become northeast–southwest and enters Warren. In Warren the roadway crosses the Salamonie River, before SR 218 turning southeast, while SR 5 continues northeast.

SR 218 heads southeast, leaving Warren, before bending to become east–west at the Huntington-Wells county line. The road forms the county line for a few mile, passing through an intersection with SR 3, before completely entering Wells County. In eastern Wells County SR 218 has an intersection with SR 1 before entering Adams County. SR 218 passes through a rural intersection with SR 116, before entering the town of Berne. In Berne the road is concurrent with Main Street and passes through an intersection with US 27 and the center of downtown Berne. East of Berne the road passes through rural farmland, before curving towards the southeast. The SR 218 designation ends at Ohio state line, while the roadway continues southeast, then east, as Ohio State Route 707.

== History ==
SR 118 was designated between SR 5, south of Warren, and Ohio state line, along modern SR 218, between 1930 and 1932. On March 28, 1932, SR 218 was commissioned between SR 9 and SR 5, in Warren. Between late 1932 and early 1933 a state road was proposed from SR 25 to SR 21, now SR 19, along the modern route of SR 218. SR 218 was commissioned between US 31 and SR 21 in either 1933 or early 1934. The road was extended west to US 35/SR 29, at the time US 35 was concurrent with SR 29, in between 1936 and 1937.

SR 218 was commissioned between SR 25 and US 35/SR 29 in either 1938 or 1939. Between 1942 and 1945 SR 218 was rerouted south around Naval Air Station Bunker Hill, now Grissom Air Reserve Base. The segment of road between SR 15 and SR 9 was added in either 1952 or 1953. The road was rerouted north around Bunker Hill Air Force Base, now Grissom Air Reserve Base, onto its modern route, between 1957 and 1959. SR 218 was extended east to the Ohio state line, along the former route of SR 118, in either 1964 or 1965. The entire roadway was paved by 1970.

== Major intersections ==
County	Location	mi	km	Destinations	Notes
Carroll	Deer Creek Township	0.000	0.000	Old SR 25	Western terminus of SR 218
Carroll	Deer Creek Township	0.121	0.195	SR 25 – Delphi, Logansport	
Carroll	Camden	5.603	9.017	SR 75 south – Flora	Northern terminus of SR 75
Carroll	Carrollton Township	13.584	21.861	SR 29 south – Burlington	Southern end of SR 29 concurrency
Carroll	Carrollton Township	17.273	27.798	SR 29 north – Logansport	Northern end of SR 29 concurrency
Cass	Walton	24.976	40.195	US 35 – Kokomo	
Miami	Pipe Creek Township	32.024	51.538	US 31 north – South Bend	Northern end of US 31 concurrency
Miami	Pipe Creek Township	33.150	53.350	US 31 south – Indianapolis	Southern end of US 31 concurrency
Miami	Santa Fe	41.382	66.598	SR 19 – Amboy, Peru	East end of western section of SR 218
Gap in route
Wabash	La Fontaine	41.383	66.599	SR 15 – Marion, Wabash	West end of eastern section
Huntington	Wayne Township	46.658	75.089	SR 105	
Huntington	Wayne Township	47.028	75.684	SR 9 – Marion, Huntington	
Huntington	Jefferson Township	52.609	84.666	SR 5 south – Upland	Western end of SR 5 concurrency
Huntington	Jefferson Township	53.069– 53.221	85.406– 85.651	I-69 – Indianapolis, Fort Wayne	Exit number 73 on I-69
Huntington	Warren	57.428	92.421	SR 5 north – Huntington	Eastern end of SR 5 concurrency
Huntington–Wells county line	Salamonie–Jackson township line	61.235	98.548	SR 3 – Hartford City, Markle	
Wells	Reiffsburg	72.839	117.223	SR 1 – Redkey, Bluffton	
Adams	Hartford Township	78.328	126.057	SR 116 – Bluffton, Geneva	
Adams	Berne	83.116	133.762	US 27 – Geneva, Decatur	
Adams	Jefferson Township	91.269	146.883	SR 707 east – Mendon	Eastern end of SR 218
1.000 mi = 1.609 km; 1.000 km = 0.621 mi: Concurrency terminus
