= Simpson, Indiana =

- Unincorporated community
- Location within Indiana Location within the United States
- Coordinates: 40°51′18″N 85°24′47″W
- Country: United States
- State: Indiana
- County: Huntington
- Township: Union
- Elevation: 810 ft (250 m)
- ZIP code: 46750
- FIPS code: 18-69858
- GNIS feature ID: 443528

Simpson is an unincorporated community in Union Township, Huntington County, Indiana.

== History ==
Simpson was platted in 1885. A post office was established at Simpson in 1886, and remained in operation until it was discontinued in 1902.
