= Chenoweth–Coulter Farm =

- U.S. National Register of Historic Places
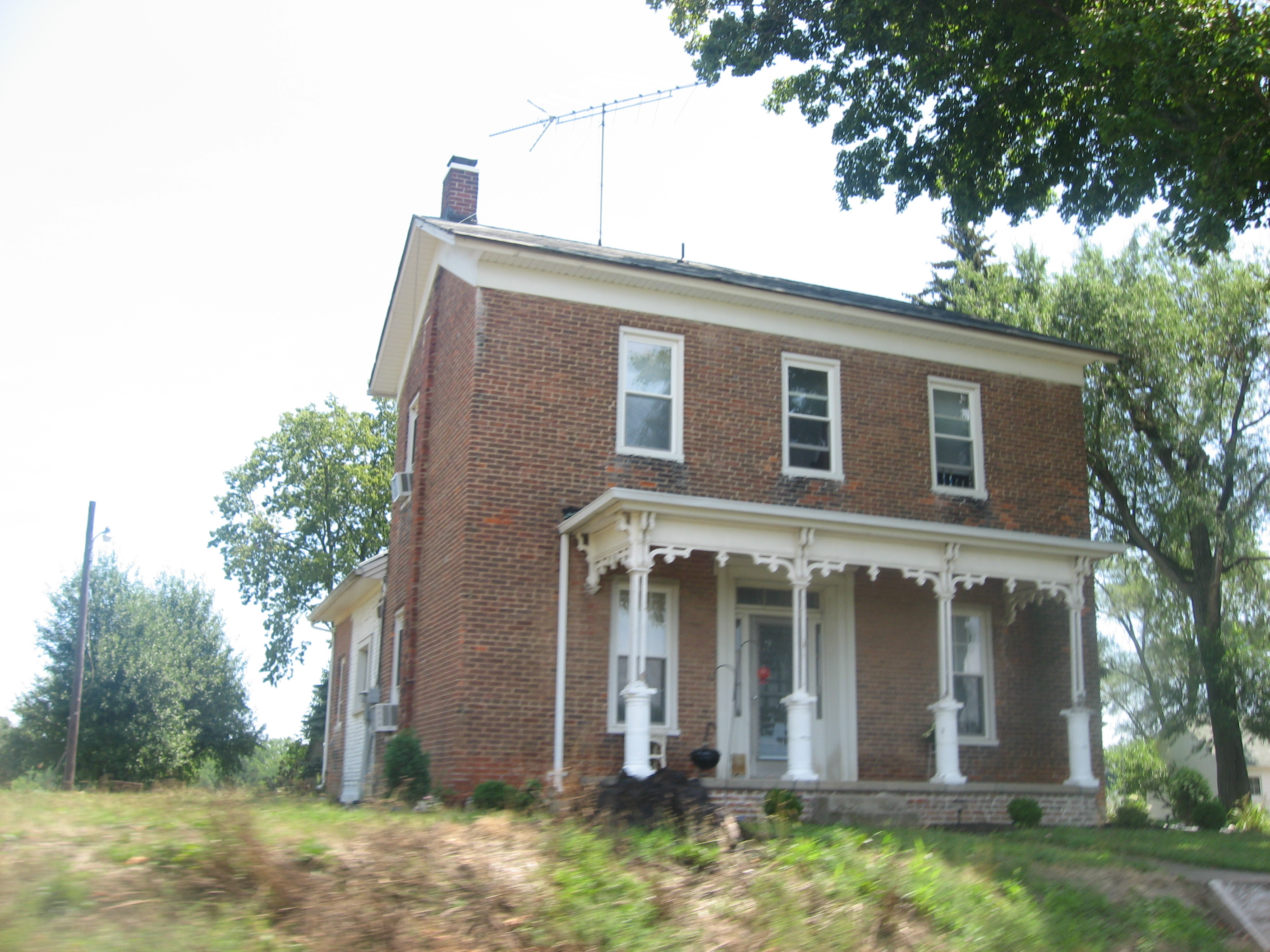
- Chenoweth–Coulter Farmhouse, July 2012

- Location within Indiana Location within the United States
- Location: 7067 S. Etna Rd., near LaFontaine in Wayne Township, Huntington County, Indiana
- Coordinates: 40°43′1″N 85°34′4″W
- Area: 2.1 acres (0.85 ha)
- Architectural style: Greek Revival, Italianate
- NRHP reference No.: 09000426
- Added to NRHP: June 17, 2009

Chenoweth–Coulter Farm, also known as Shady Brook Farm, is a historic home and farm located in Wayne Township, Huntington County, Indiana. The farmhouse was built in 1866, and is a two-story, three-bay, Greek Revival style brick I-house with a 1 1/2-story rear wing. It has a one-story, Italianate/Gothic Revival style front porch. Also on the property the contributing well house, wood house, garage, drive-through corn crib, chicken house, bank barn (1870), and privy.

It was listed on the National Register of Historic Places in 2009.
