= Brown's Corners, Ontario =

Brown's Corners, Ontario can mean the following places:

- Brown's Corners, Toronto
- Brown's Corners, Markham, in York Regional Municipality
- Brown's Corners, Norwich Township, Oxford County, Ontario
- Brown's Corners, Zorra Township, Oxford County, Ontario
- Brown's Corners, Pickering Township in Ontario county; later known as Audley village, now part of Ajax
