= Buckeye, Indiana =

- Unincorporated community
- Location within Indiana Location within the United States
- Coordinates: 40°41′28″N 85°21′14″W
- Country: United States
- State: Indiana
- County: Huntington
- Township: Salamonie
- Elevation: 860 ft (260 m)
- ZIP code: 46792
- FIPS code: 18-08830
- GNIS feature ID: 431742

Buckeye is an unincorporated community in Salamonie Township, Huntington County, Indiana.

== History ==
Buckeye had its start in the year 1879 by the building of the railroad through that territory. A post office was established at Buckeye in 1879, and remained in operation until it was discontinued in 1920.
