= Wayne Township, Huntington County, Indiana =

Wayne Township
- Township
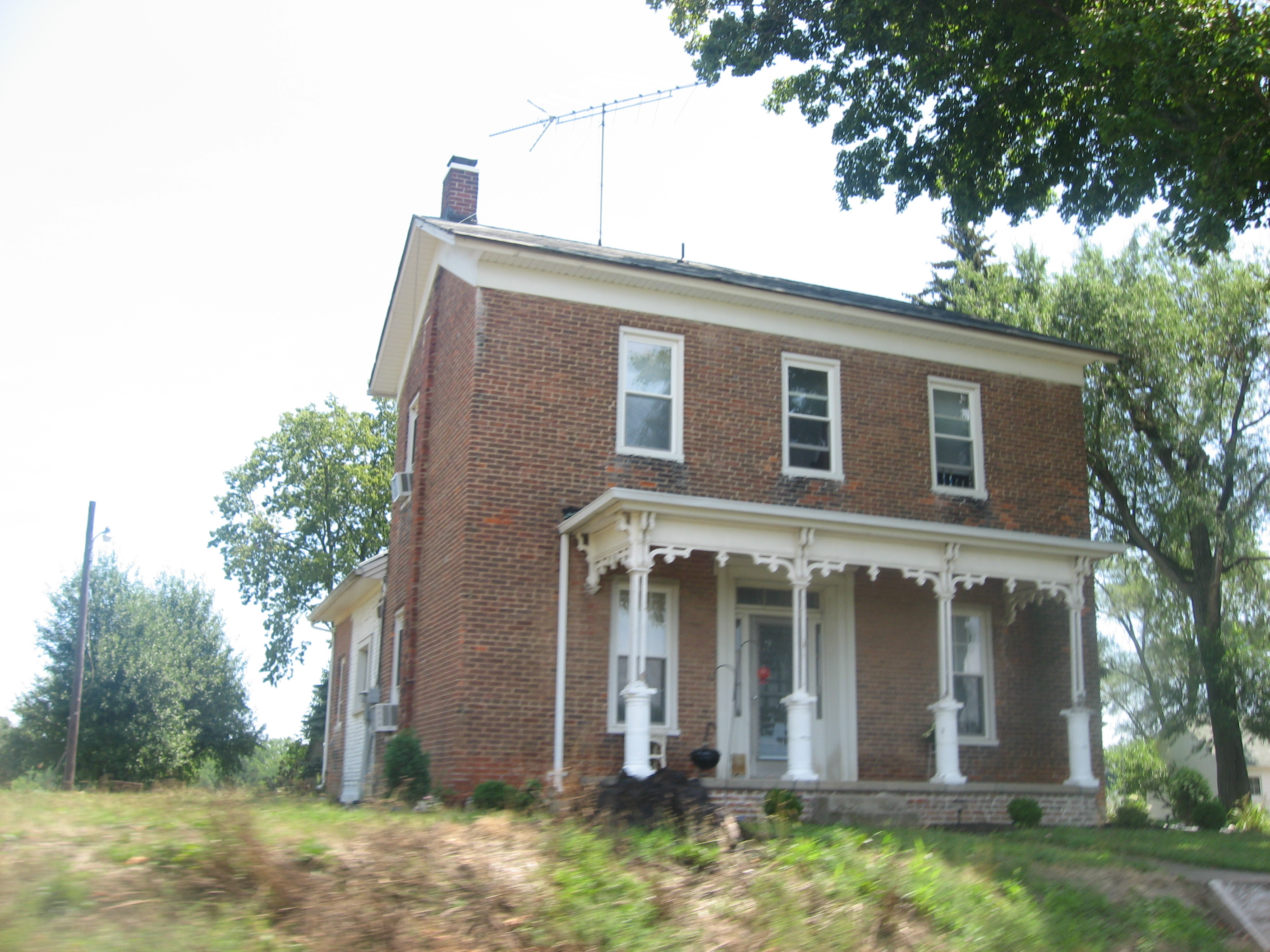
- The Chenoweth-Coulter Farmhouse, a historic site in the township

- Location in Huntington County
- Coordinates: 40°41′49″N 85°36′10″W
- Country: United States
- State: Indiana
- County: Huntington

Government
  - Type: Indiana township

Area
  - Total: 24.41 sq mi (63.2 km^{2})
  - Land: 24.36 sq mi (63.1 km^{2})
  - Water: 0.05 sq mi (0.13 km^{2}) 0.20%
- Elevation: 850 ft (260 m)

Population (2020)
  - Total: 470
  - Density: 22.2/sq mi (8.6/km^{2})
- GNIS feature ID: 0454032

Wayne Township is one of twelve townships in Huntington County, Indiana, United States. As of the 2020 census, its population was 470.

== History ==
Wayne Township was organized in 1844. Some of the early settlers being natives of Wayne County, Indiana caused the name to be selected.

The Chenoweth-Coulter Farm was listed on the National Register of Historic Places in 2009.

== Geography ==
According to the 2010 census, the township has a total area of 24.41 square miles (63.2 km^{2}), of which 24.36 square miles (63.1 km^{2}) (or 99.80%) is land and 0.05 square miles (0.13 km^{2}) (or 0.20%) is water. The stream of Prairie Creek runs through this township.

=== Cities and towns ===
- Mount Etna (southwest edge of town, northeast edge of Twp.)

=== Unincorporated towns ===
- Banquo

=== Adjacent townships ===
- Polk Township (north)
- Lancaster Township (northeast)
- Jefferson Township (east)
- Van Buren Township, Grant County (southeast)
- Washington Township, Grant County (south)
- Liberty Township, Wabash County (west)
- Lagro Township, Wabash County (northwest)

=== Cemeteries ===
The township contains one cemetery, Gardens of Memory.

=== Major highways ===
- Indiana State Road 105
- Indiana State Road 124
- Indiana State Road 218

== Demographics ==
Historical population
| Census | Pop. | Note | %± |
|---|---|---|---|
| 1890 | 1,047 | | — |
| 1900 | 900 | | −14.0% |
| 1910 | 955 | | 6.1% |
| 1920 | 755 | | −20.9% |
| 1930 | 658 | | −12.8% |
| 1940 | 617 | | −6.2% |
| 1950 | 590 | | −4.4% |
| 1960 | 612 | | 3.7% |
| 1970 | 659 | | 7.7% |
| 1980 | 621 | | −5.8% |
| 1990 | 549 | | −11.6% |
| 2000 | 559 | | 1.8% |
| 2010 | 540 | | −3.4% |
| 2020 | 470 | | −13.0% |
US Decennial Census
