= Jackson Township, Huntington County, Indiana =

Jackson Township
- Township
- Location in Huntington County
- Coordinates: 40°57′38″N 85°23′49″W
- Country: United States
- State: Indiana
- County: Huntington

Government
  - Type: Indiana township

Area
  - Total: 36.85 sq mi (95.4 km^{2})
  - Land: 36.41 sq mi (94.3 km^{2})
  - Water: 0.44 sq mi (1.1 km^{2}) 1.19%
- Elevation: 784 ft (239 m)

Population (2020)
  - Total: 4,125
  - Density: 113.3/sq mi (43.74/km^{2})
- GNIS feature ID: 0453450

Jackson Township is one of twelve townships in Huntington County, Indiana, United States. As of the 2020 census, its population was 4,125 (up from 4,043 at 2010) and it contained 1,856 housing units.

== History ==
Jackson Township was organized in 1841.

== Geography ==
According to the 2010 census, the township has a total area of 36.85 square miles (95.4 km^{2}), of which 36.41 square miles (94.3 km^{2}) (or 98.81%) is land and 0.44 square miles (1.1 km^{2}) (or 1.19%) is water.

=== Cities and towns ===
- Roanoke

=== Unincorporated towns ===
- Mahon
- Roanoke Station

=== Adjacent townships ===
- Jefferson Township, Whitley County (north)
- Aboite Township, Allen County (northeast)
- Lafayette Township, Allen County (east)
- Union Township, Wells County (southeast)
- Union Township (south)
- Huntington Township (southwest)
- Clear Creek Township (west)
- Washington Township, Whitley County (northwest)

=== Cemeteries ===
The township contains two cemeteries: France and Union.

=== Major highways ===
- U.S. Route 24
- Indiana State Road 114

=== Airports and landing strips ===
- Fisher Farm Airport
- The Wolf Den Airport
