= Phyllis Pond =

American politician

Member of the Indiana House of Representatives from the 85th district
- In office November 4, 1992 – September 22, 2013
- Preceded by: Constituency established
- Succeeded by: Casey Cox

Member of the Indiana House of Representatives from the 20th district
- In office November 3, 1982 – November 4, 1992
- Preceded by: Jim Jontz
- Succeeded by: Mary Kay McMahon Budak

Member of the Indiana House of Representatives from the 15th district
- In office November 8, 1978 – November 3, 1982
- Preceded by: Arthur Chester Hayes
- Succeeded by: Esther Lillian Harper Fifield

Personal details
- Born: October 25, 1930
- Died: September 22, 2013 (aged 82)
- Party: Republican
- Spouse: George Walter Pond (m. 1951; died 2022)
- Children: 3
- Education: Ball State University; Indiana State University

Phyllis Joan Ruble Pond (October 25, 1930 – September 22, 2013) was an American educator and politician.

Born in Warren, Indiana, Pond grew up on a farm near there and graduated from Warren High School; she then received her degrees in education from Ball State University and Indiana State University. Pond then taught school in different places and then in New Haven, Indiana, where she lived. Pond served in the Indiana House of Representatives as a Republican from 1978 until her death in 2013. Pond died in New Haven, Indiana just before her retirement from the Indiana House of Representatives took effect.
