= USS Roanoke =

USS Roanoke may refer to:

- USS Roanoke (1855) was a screw frigate commissioned in 1857, converted to carry three revolving turrets in 1863, and in periodic use until 1882
- USS Roanoke (ID-1695) was the civilian vessel El Dia converted to a minelayer in 1917 and returned in 1919
- USS Roanoke (PF-93) was a Tacoma-class patrol gunboat, reclassified as a patrol frigate, then renamed Lorain in 1944 while under construction
- USS Roanoke (CL-114), a Fargo-class light cruiser, was canceled on 5 October 1944, prior to the start of construction
- USS Roanoke (CL-145) was a Worcester-class light cruiser in service from 1949 to 1958
- USNS Roanoke (T-AOR-155) was a fleet replenishment oiler from 1956 to 1957
- USS Roanoke (AOR-7) was a Wichita-class replenishment oiler in service from 1976 to 1995
