= Brown's Corners, Toronto =

Brown's Corners
- Etymology: Named after settler David Brown
- Location of Brown's Corners in Toronto
- Coordinates: 43°48′44″N 79°14′48″W
- Country: Canada
- Province: Ontario
- Municipality: Toronto
- Elevation: 173 m (568 ft)
- Time zone: UTC-5 (Eastern Time Zone)
  - Summer (DST): UTC-4 (Eastern Time Zone)
- Area codes: 416, 647, 437
- CGNDB key: FEABC

Brown's Corners (also Browns Corners) is a neighbourhood in Toronto, Ontario, Canada. It is centered at the corner of Finch Avenue East and Markham Road in the district of Scarborough.

David Brown operated a business and post office on the southwest corner. The Post Office was relocated to Malvern Village, but the business continued as a grocery store well into the 1950s. The northwest corner was the Hastings farm. The Hastings farm house was relocated to the Cullen Gardens park in Whitby to await restoration. A huge barn was located at the intersection and remained there long after the farms disappeared. A car dealership replaced the farmhouse and barns. Thomas Maxwell lived on the northeast corner and there were smaller houses on the southeast corner.

Today the area is mainly industrial and home to the large Canadian Pacific Railway's Agincourt Marshalling Yard. In the beginning, Fisher's Hill dominated the area south of Finch Avenue (Concession 4) and it was demolished and used to provide the level and proper gradient for the railway development.

Leila Fletcher, whose name is associated with learning to play the piano exercise books, lived at Browns Corners in the 1950s.

Other businesses located nearby:

- Pascal Furniture store - now a used car dealership
- Formula Honda dealership
- Honeywell Canada
- T-Fal Canada
