= Huntington North High School =

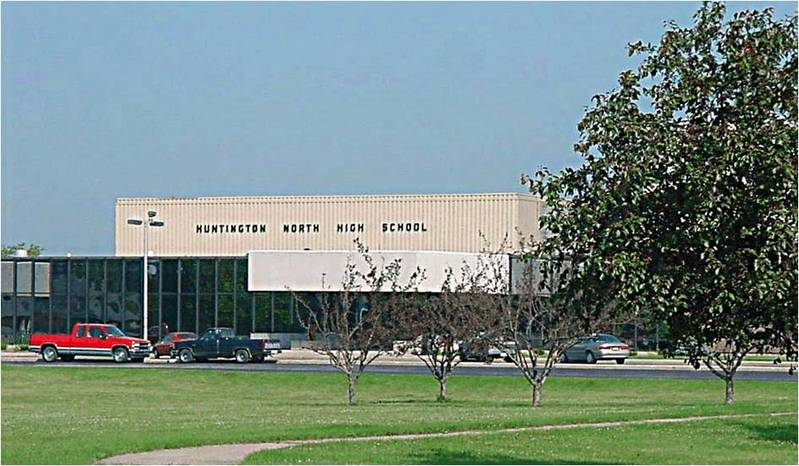
- Huntington North High School in 2011

Location
- 450 MacGahan Street; Huntington, Huntington County, Indiana 46750; United States; 40°53′30″N 85°30′37″W

Information
- Type: Public high school
- Established: 1969
- School district: Huntington County Community School Corporation
- Principal: Patrick McLaughlin
- Teaching staff: 97.33 (FTE)
- Grades: 9-12
- Enrollment: 1,441 (2024–2025)
- Student to teacher ratio: 14.81
- Campus type: suburban
- Color
- Athletics conference: Northeast Eight Conference
- Team name: Vikings
- Rival: Homestead
- Yearbook: Deka
- Website: School website

Huntington North High School is a public high school serving all of Huntington County, Indiana. The school is operated by the Huntington County Community School Corporation.

== History ==
Huntington North opened in 1969; the school opened over a month late into the school year due to construction projects. With minimal repairs made to the building over 50 years, a 2019 test that resulted in high carbon dioxide levels led some parents to disenroll their children from the school. A November 2019 referendum to build a new academic wing, performing arts wing and technical education wing failed.

== Demographics ==
For the 2018–19 school year, the demographic breakdown of the 1,459 students was:

- White 1,353 - 93%
- Black 7 - 0.5%
- Asian 6 - 0.4%
- Hispanic 62 - 4.2%
- Native American 3 - 0.2%
- Multiracial 28 - 1.9%

== Athletics ==
Huntington North, home of the Vikings, is a member of the Northeast Eight Conference. The school's colors are red, white, and black. The girls basketball team took the state title in 1990 and 1995.

== Activities ==
The school yearbook, Deka, won a National Pacemaker Award in 1995.

HNHS fields two competitive show choirs, the mixed-gender "Varsity Singers" and the all-female "Viking Volume". Both groups have claimed caption awards and state grand champion awards at ISSMA small-school state championships. The program also hosts an annual competition, the Midwest Showcase.

== Notable alumni ==
- Lauren Johnson, professional runner
- Chris Kramer, (born 1988), basketball player in the Israel Basketball Premier League
- E. J. Tackett, professional ten-pin bowler
- Dan Quayle, United States Vice President from 1989 to 1993
- Addison Wiley, American middle-distance runner

== See also ==
- List of high schools in Indiana
