= Banquo, Indiana =

- Unincorporated community
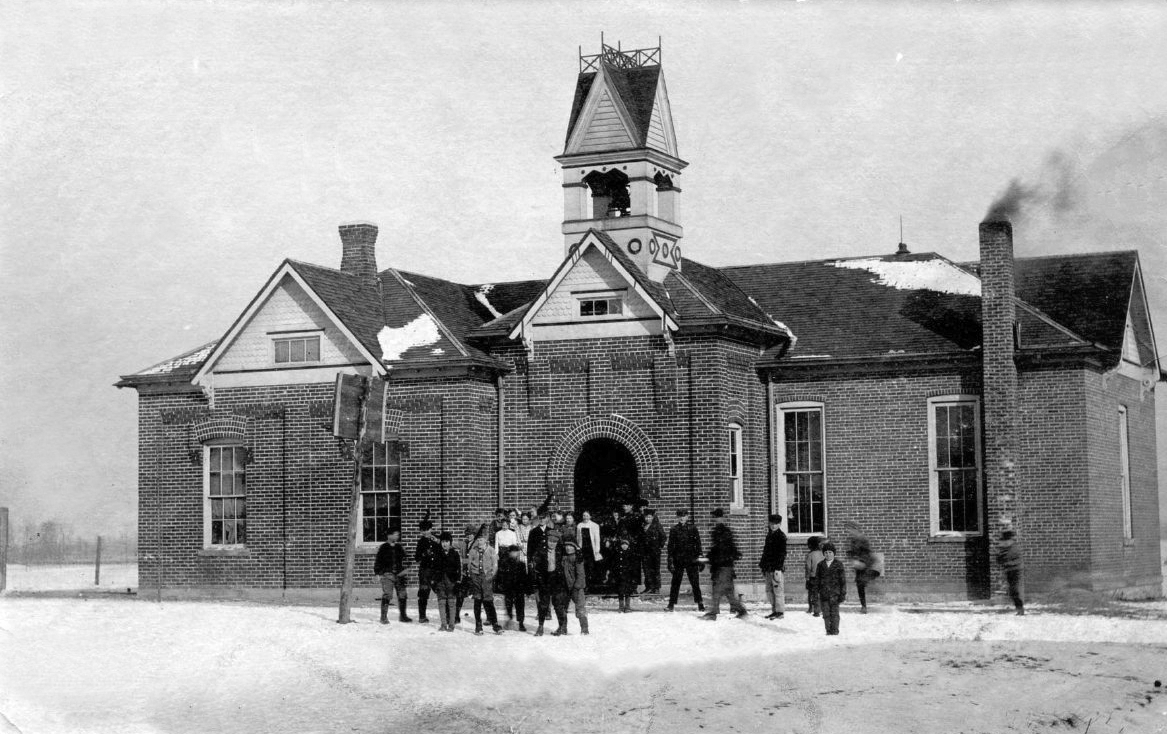
- High School in Banquo, circa 1915

- Location within Indiana Location within the United States
- Coordinates: 40°41′47″N 85°37′11″W
- Country: United States
- State: Indiana
- County: Huntington
- Township: Wayne
- Elevation: 856 ft (261 m)
- ZIP code: 46940
- FIPS code: 18-03304
- GNIS feature ID: 430476

Banquo is an unincorporated community in Wayne Township, Huntington County, Indiana, United States.

== History ==
Banquo was platted in 1906, but a village had existed at the site for some time prior.
