= Roanoke Station, Indiana =

- Unincorporated community
- Location within Indiana Location within the United States
- Coordinates: 40°57′07″N 85°21′51″W
- Country: United States
- State: Indiana
- County: Huntington
- Township: Jackson
- Elevation: 751 ft (229 m)
- ZIP code: 46783
- FIPS code: 18-65025
- GNIS feature ID: 442130

Roanoke Station is an unincorporated community in Jackson Township, Huntington County, Indiana.

Roanoke Station began as a depot outside Roanoke, and thus acquired its name.
