= Majenica, Indiana =

- Unincorporated community
- Location within Indiana Location within the United States
- Coordinates: 40°46′12″N 85°27′12″W
- Country: United States
- State: Indiana
- County: Huntington
- Township: Lancaster
- Elevation: 830 ft (250 m)
- ZIP code: 46750
- FIPS code: 18-46260
- GNIS feature ID: 438489

Majenica is an unincorporated community in Lancaster Township, Huntington County, Indiana, United States.

== History ==
Majenica was the name of an Indian chief.
