= Bowerstown, Indiana =

- Unincorporated community
- Location within Indiana Location within the United States
- Coordinates: 40°53′19″N 85°26′33″W
- Country: United States
- State: Indiana
- County: Huntington
- Township: Union
- Elevation: 742 ft (226 m)
- ZIP code: 46750
- FIPS code: 18-06814
- GNIS feature ID: 431401

Bowerstown is an unincorporated community in Union Township, Huntington County, Indiana.

== History ==
Samuel H. Bowers started a feed mill and repair shop in Bowerstown ca. 1909.
