= Mount Etna, Indiana =

- Town
- Location of Mount Etna in Huntington County, Indiana.
- Coordinates: 40°44′28″N 85°33′43″W
- Country: United States
- State: Indiana
- County: Huntington
- Townships: Jefferson, Lancaster, Polk, Wayne

Area
  - Total: 0.12 sq mi (0.30 km^{2})
  - Land: 0.12 sq mi (0.30 km^{2})
  - Water: 0 sq mi (0.00 km^{2})
- Elevation: 814 ft (248 m)

Population (2020)
  - Total: 111
  - Density: 950/sq mi (366.8/km^{2})
- Time zone: UTC-5 (Eastern (EST))
  - Summer (DST): UTC-4 (EDT)
- ZIP code: 46750
- Area code: 260
- FIPS code: 18-51408
- GNIS feature ID: 2396789

Mount Etna is a town in Huntington County, Indiana, United States. As of the 2020 census, Mount Etna had a population of 111. It lies at the intersection of four townships: Jefferson, Lancaster, Polk and Wayne.

== History ==
Mount Etna was platted in 1839. It was an important trading point in the 19th century until the building of the railroad through neighboring rival towns diverted much of its business.

== Geography ==
Mount Etna is located on State Route 124 about 20 miles (32 km) west of Bluffton. According to the 2010 census, Mount Etna has a total area of 0.08 square miles (0.21 km^{2}), all land.

== Demographics ==
Historical population
Census	Pop.	Note	%±
1860	155		—
1870	221		42.6%
1880	182		−17.6%
1900	175		—
1910	148		−15.4%
1920	137		−7.4%
1930	135		−1.5%
1940	139		3.0%
1950	171		23.0%
1960	192		12.3%
1970	164		−14.6%
1980	122		−25.6%
1990	111		−9.0%
2000	110		−0.9%
2010	94		−14.5%
2020	111		18.1%
U.S. Decennial Census

=== 2010 census ===
As of the census of 2010, there were 94 people, 42 households, and 27 families living in the town. The population density was 1,175.0 inhabitants per square mile (453.7/km^{2}). There were 51 housing units at an average density of 637.5 per square mile (246.1/km^{2}). The racial makeup of the town was 96.8% White, 2.1% Pacific Islander, and 1.1% from other races. Hispanic or Latino of any race were 2.1% of the population.

There were 42 households, of which 26.2% had children under the age of 18 living with them, 54.8% were married couples living together, 2.4% had a female householder with no husband present, 7.1% had a male householder with no wife present, and 35.7% were non-families. 28.6% of all households were made up of individuals, and 7.1% had someone living alone who was 65 years of age or older. The average household size was 2.24 and the average family size was 2.70.

The median age in the town was 45.2 years. 17% of residents were under the age of 18; 4.3% were between the ages of 18 and 24; 27.6% were from 25 to 44; 35.1% were from 45 to 64; and 16% were 65 years of age or older. The gender makeup of the town was 53.2% male and 46.8% female.

=== 2000 census ===
As of the census of 2000, there were 110 people, 42 households, and 34 families living in the town. The population density was 1,343.1 inhabitants per square mile (518.6/km^{2}). There were 46 housing units at an average density of 561.6 per square mile (216.8/km^{2}). The racial makeup of the town was 100.00% White.

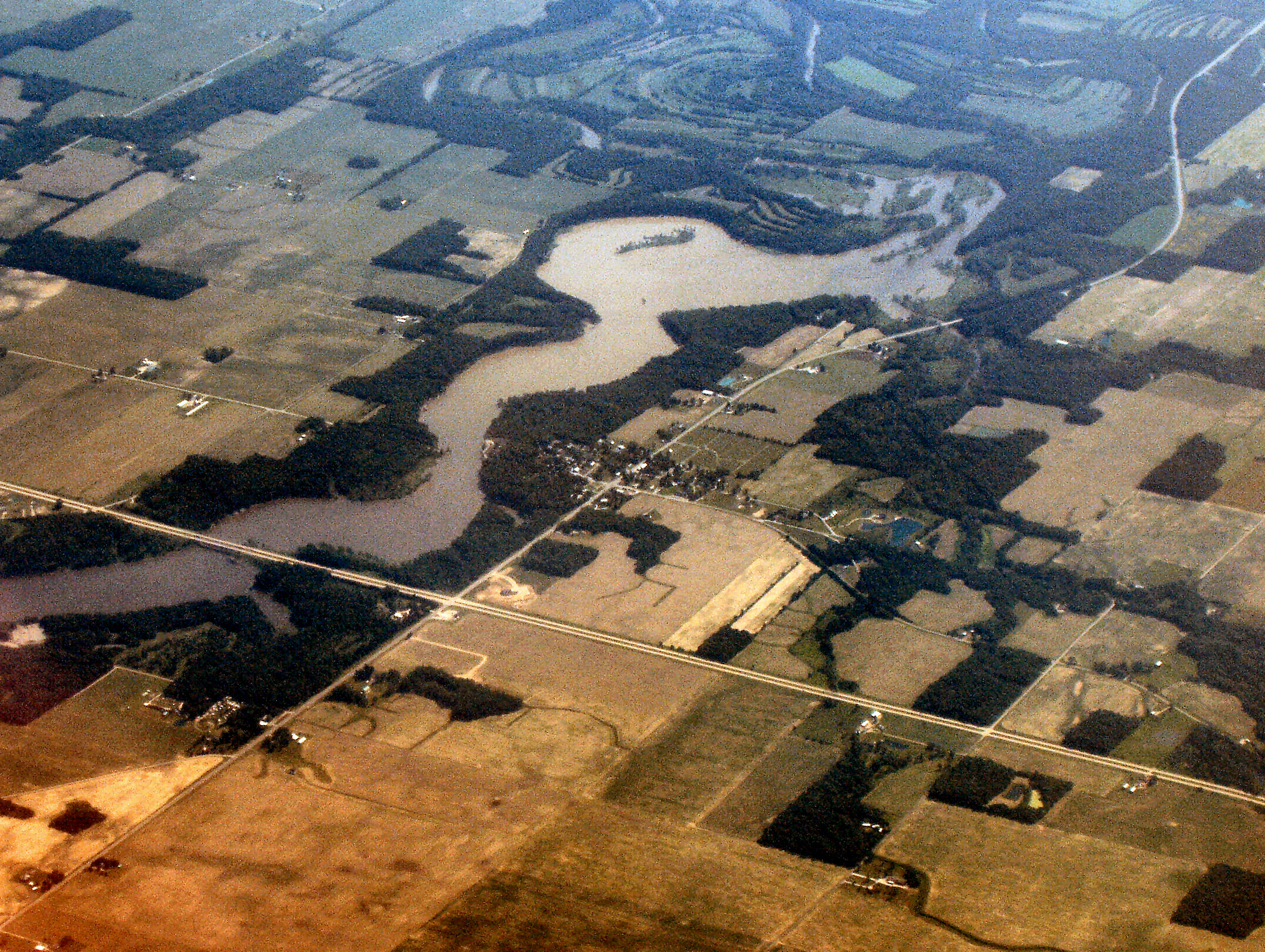
Mount Etna from the air, looking northeast.

There were 42 households, out of which 33.3% had children under the age of 18 living with them, 66.7% were married couples living together, 11.9% had a female householder with no husband present, and 19.0% were non-families. 19.0% of all households were made up of individuals, and 11.9% had someone living alone who was 65 years of age or older. The average household size was 2.62 and the average family size was 3.00.

In the town, the population was spread out, with 24.5% under the age of 18, 6.4% from 18 to 24, 26.4% from 25 to 44, 28.2% from 45 to 64, and 14.5% who were 65 years of age or older. The median age was 38 years. For every 100 females, there were 83.3 males. For every 100 females age 18 and over, there were 84.4 males.

The median income for a household in the town was $37,500, and the median income for a family was $42,500. Males had a median income of $29,167 versus $22,500 for females. The per capita income for the town was $13,421. There were 6.3% of families and 10.7% of the population living below the poverty line, including 25.0% of under eighteens and none of those over 64.
