= Bippus, Indiana =

- Unincorporated community and Census-designated place
- Location within Indiana Location within the United States
- Coordinates: 40°56′37″N 85°37′32″W
- Country: United States
- State: Indiana
- County: Huntington
- Township: Warren
- Elevation: 850 ft (260 m)
- ZIP code: 46750
- FIPS code: 18-05338
- GNIS feature ID: 2830417

Bippus is an unincorporated community in Warren Township, Huntington County, Indiana, United States.

== History ==
Bippus was laid out and platted in 1885, although a settlement had existed there for sometime prior. It was named for George Jacob Bippus, who was instrumental in bringing the railroad to the site.

== Demographics ==
The United States Census Bureau delineated Bippus as a census designated place in the 2022 American Community Survey.

== Notable people ==
Bippus was the hometown of sportscaster Chris Schenkel.
