= Huntington County, Indiana =

County in Indiana, United States

- County
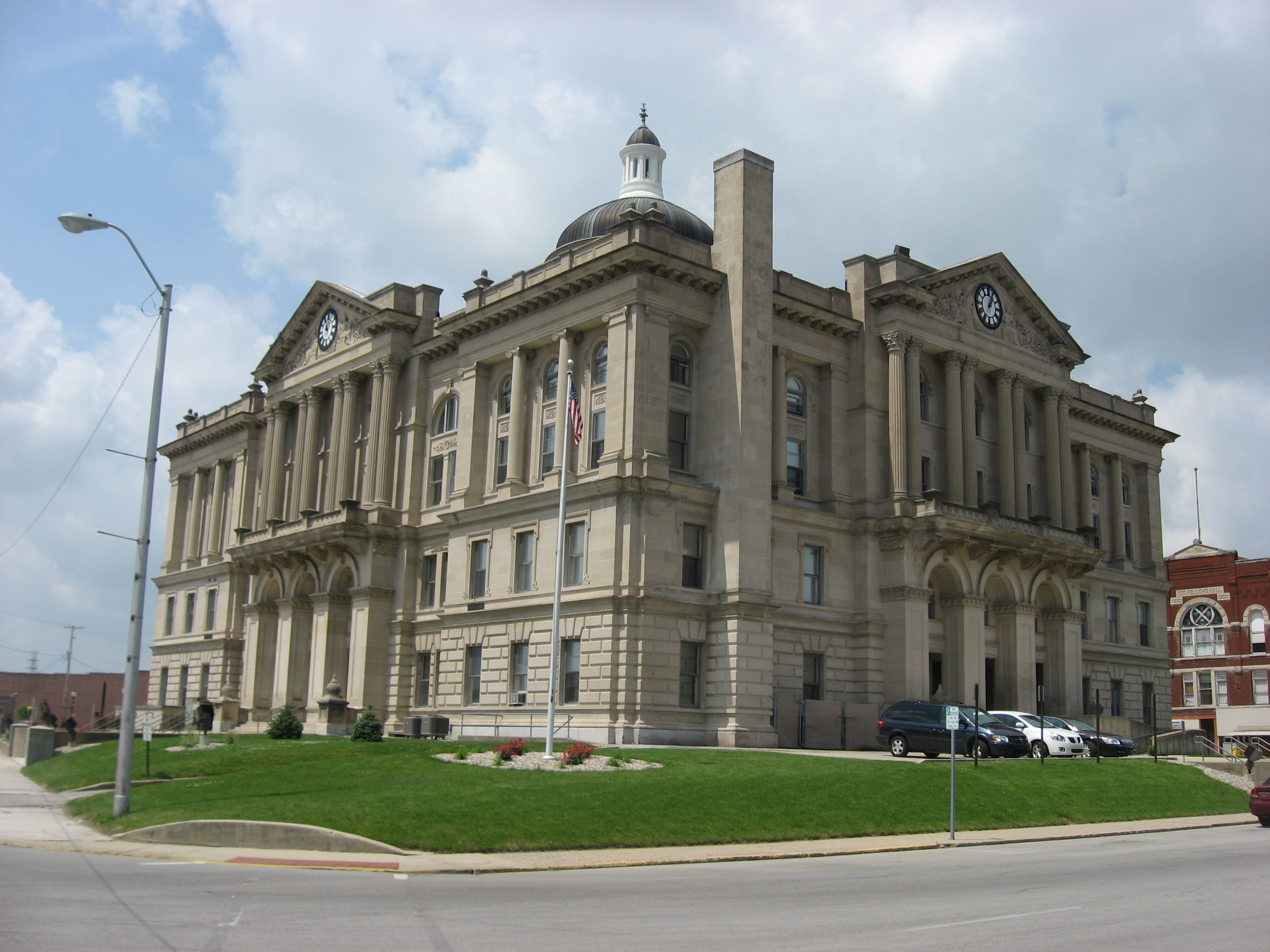
- Huntington County Courthouse in Huntington

- Logo

- Location within the U.S. state of Indiana
- Coordinates: 40°50′N 85°29′W
- Country: United States
- State: Indiana
- Founded: February 2, 1832 (authorized); May 5, 1834 (organized)
- Named for: Samuel Huntington
- Seat: Huntington
- Largest city: Huntington

Area
  - Total: 387.72 sq mi (1,004.2 km^{2})
  - Land: 382.65 sq mi (991.1 km^{2})
  - Water: 5.07 sq mi (13.1 km^{2}) 1.31%

Population (2020)
  - Total: 36,662
  - Estimate (2025): 37,224 ▲
  - Density: 95.811/sq mi (36.993/km^{2})
- Time zone: UTC−5 (Eastern)
  - Summer (DST): UTC−4 (EDT)
- Congressional district: 3rd
- Website: www.huntington.in.us/county/
- Indiana county number 35

Huntington County is a county in the northeastern central part of the U.S. state of Indiana. According to the 2020 United States census, the population was 36,662. The county seat (and only city) is Huntington. Huntington County comprises the Huntington, Indiana micropolitan statistical area and is included in the Fort Wayne–Huntington–Auburn Combined Statistical Area.

== History ==
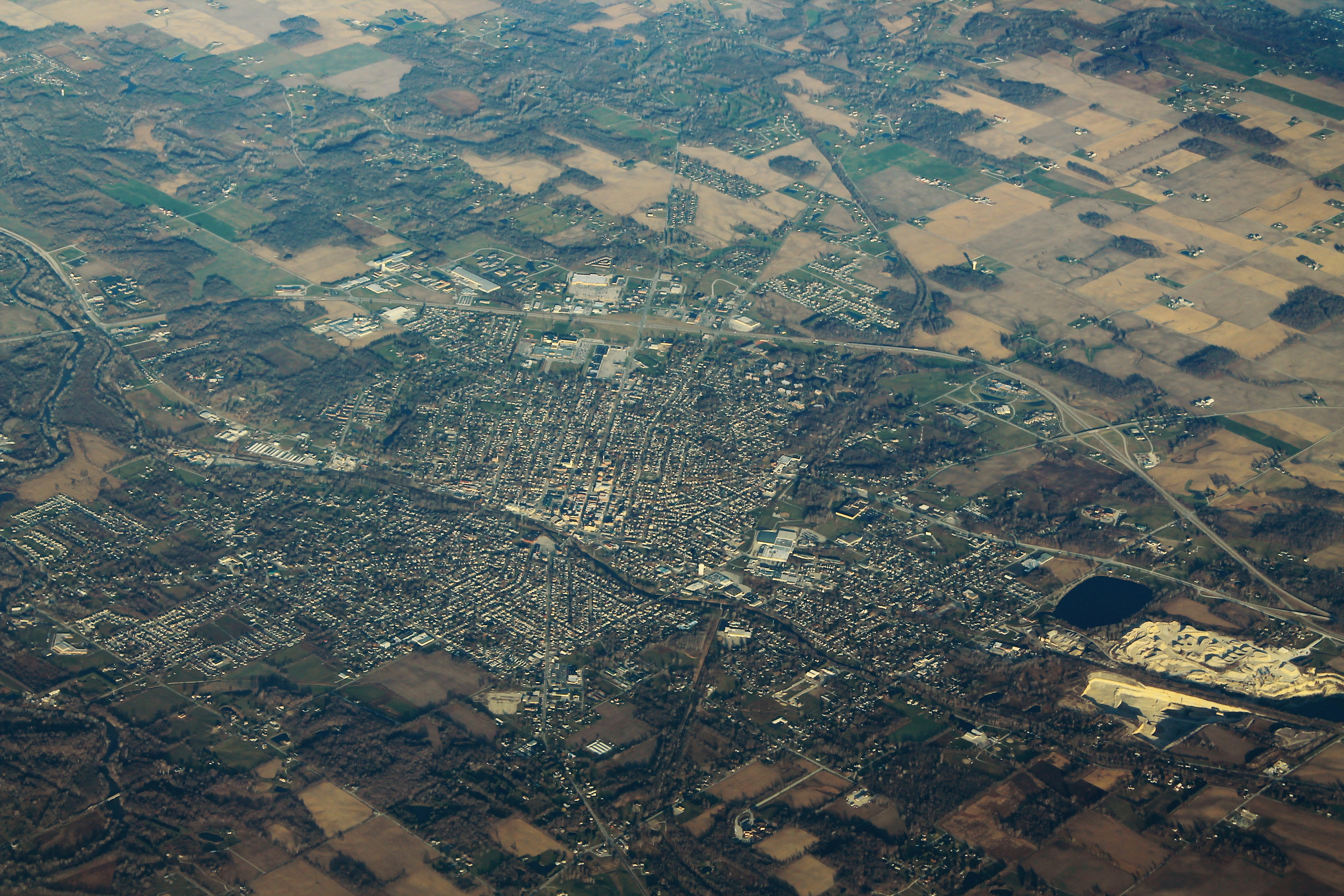
The city of Huntington from the southwest

Huntington County was organized from the previously unorganized Indiana Territory and lands gained by the Adams New Purchase of 1818. The county's creation was authorized by an act of the Indiana state legislature dated February 2, 1832. Organization of the county's governing structure began on May 5, 1834. The first non–Native American settlers in what has since become Huntington County were a group of 29 farm families from Connecticut who arrived in the early 1830s. These were "Yankee" settlers, meaning they were descended from the English Puritans who settled New England in the colonial era. These settlers were able to get to what has since become Huntington County due to the construction of the Wabash and Erie Canal, which was a shipping canal that connected the Great Lakes to the Ohio River by way of a manmade waterway. When they arrived in what has since become Huntington County, the settlers from Connecticut found dense virgin forest and wild prairie. The original 29 "Yankee" families from Connecticut laid out roads; built a post office; established post routes; and built a town hall, a church, and a schoolhouse from the trees in the area that they cut down. The county was named for Samuel Huntington, who signed the Declaration of Independence and the Articles of Confederation. He was also president of the Continental Congress under the Articles of Confederation.

== Geography ==
The terrain of Huntington County consists of low rolling hills, completely devoted to agriculture or urban development. The Wabash River flows to the west through the upper-central part of the county, while the Salamonie River flows to the west through the lower part. Its highest point (about 925 feet (282 m) above sea level) is at the southwest corner. According to the 2010 census, the county has a total area of 387.72 square miles (1,004.2 km^{2}), of which 382.65 square miles (991.1 km^{2}) (or 98.69%) is land and 5.07 square miles (13.1 km^{2}) (or 1.31%) is water.

=== Adjacent counties ===
- Whitley County – north
- Allen County – northeast
- Wells County – east
- Grant County – south
- Wabash County – west

=== Highways ===
- Interstate 69
- U.S. Route 24
- U.S. Route 224
- State Road 3
- State Road 5
- State Road 9
- State Road 16
- State Road 105
- State Road 114
- State Road 116
- State Road 124
- State Road 218

=== City and towns ===
- Andrews
- Huntington (city)
- Markle (partial)
- Mount Etna
- Roanoke
- Warren

=== Townships ===
- Clear Creek
- Dallas
- Huntington
- Jackson
- Jefferson
- Lancaster
- Polk
- Rock Creek
- Salamonie
- Union
- Warren
- Wayne

=== Unincorporated communities ===
- Banquo
- Bippus
- Bowerstown
- Bracken
- Buckeye
- Goblesville
- Harlansburg
- Lancaster
- Mahon
- Majenica
- Makin
- Mardenis
- Milo
- Pleasant Plain
- Plum Tree
- Roanoke Station
- Rock Creek Center
- Simpson

=== Protected areas ===
- JE Roush Fish and Wildlife Area
- Lost Bridge State Recreation Area

== Notable people ==
=== Public servants ===
- Samuel E. Cook (1860–1946), U.S. congressman
- J. Danforth Quayle, U.S. representative, senator, vice-president
- J. Edward Roush (1920–2004), U.S. representative, father of "911"
- Elizebeth (Smith) Friedman (1892–1980), author and pioneer in cryptology during WWI to WWII era, called "America's first female cryptanalyst"

=== Celebrities ===
- Chris Schenkel (1923–2005), sportscaster
- Archbishop John F. Noll (1875–1956), founded Catholic newspaper Our Sunday Visitor, founded Victory Noll and St. Felix Monastery.

=== Artists ===
- Mick Mars, guitarist for Mötley Crüe.

=== Athletes ===
- Gary Dilley, Tokyo Olympics swimmer
- George Haines, Olympic Women's Swim coach
- Chris Kramer, professional basketball player. Kramer played college basketball at Purdue University where he was two-time Big Ten Defensive Player of the Year.

== Points of interest ==
- Huntington County Historical Museum
- Huntington University Arboretum and Botanical Garden
- Huntington University
- J. Edward Roush Lake
- Merillat Centre for the Arts
- Our Sunday Visitor Corporate Headquarters
- Sheets Wildlife Museum and Learning Center
- The Forks Of The Wabash
- The Indiana Room Genealogy Center
- Tel-Hy Nature Preserve
- United States Vice Presidential Museum
- Victory Noll Center

== Education ==
=== School district ===
- Huntington County Community School Corporation

=== Private schools ===
- Huntington Area Home Educators
- Huntington Catholic School

=== Higher education ===
- Huntington University

== News and media ==
=== Newspapers ===
- The Huntington County TAB
- Warren Weekly
- HuntingtonFreePress
- Huntingtonian
- Indiana Plain Dealer

=== Radio ===
- WBZQ 1300 AM
- Huntington North High School WVSH Viking Radio
- WQHU-LP Huntington University Radio WQHU 105.5-FM Forester Radio]

== Climate and weather ==
Huntington, Indiana

Climate chart (precipitation, max. and min. temperature)
J	F	M	A	M	J	J	A	S	O	N	D
2 32 16	1.8 37 18	2.9 48 28	3.4 61 38	4.1 73 48	4.4 83 58	3.6 87 62	3.6 84 60	2.8 78 52	2.8 65 41	2.9 50 32	2.8 38 22
- █ Average max. and min. temperatures in °F
- █ Precipitation totals in inches
- Source: The Weather Channel
Metric conversion
J	F	M	A	M	J	J	A	S	O	N	D
51 0 −9	46 3 −8	74 9 −2	87 16 3	104 23 9	111 28 14	91 31 17	90 29 16	72 26 11	72 18 5	74 10 0	71 3 −6
- █ Average max. and min. temperatures in °C
- █ Precipitation totals in mm

In recent years, average temperatures in Huntington have ranged from a low of 16 °F (−9 °C) in January to a high of 87 °F (31 °C) in July, although a record low of −28 °F (−33 °C) was recorded in January 1982 and a record high of 105 °F (41 °C) was recorded in June 1988. Average monthly precipitation ranged from 1.82 inches (46 mm) in February to 4.37 inches (111 mm) in June.

== Government ==
The county government is a constitutional body, and is granted specific powers by the Constitution of Indiana, and by the Indiana Code.

County Council: The fiscal branch of the county government; controls spending and revenue collection in the county. Representatives, elected to four-year terms from county districts, are responsible for setting salaries, the annual budget, and special spending. The council has limited authority to impose local taxes, in the form of an income and property tax that is subject to state level approval, excise taxes, and service taxes.

Board of Commissioners: The executive and legislative body of the county. The commissioners are elected county-wide to staggered four-year terms. One commissioner serves as president. The commissioners are charged with collecting revenue and managing the county government.

Court: The county maintains a small claims court that handles civil cases. The judge on the court is elected to a term of four years and must be a member of the Indiana Bar Association. The judge is assisted by a constable who is also elected to a four-year term. In some cases, court decisions can be appealed to the state level circuit court.

County Officials: The county has other elected offices, including sheriff, coroner, auditor, treasurer, recorder, surveyor, and circuit court clerk. These officers are elected to four-year terms. Members elected to county government positions are required to declare party affiliations and to be residents of the county.

Huntington County is part of Indiana's 3rd congressional district; Indiana Senate districts 17 and 19; and Indiana House of Representatives district 50.

Presidential Election Analysis: Huntington County has been strongly Republican; Lyndon B. Johnson was the last Democratic Party candidate to carry the county (1964).

United States presidential election results for Huntington County, Indiana
Year	Republican		Democratic		Third party(ies)	
Year	No.	%	No.	%	No.	%
1888	3,559	49.23%	3,481	48.15%	189	2.61%
1892	3,384	46.66%	3,460	47.70%	409	5.64%
1896	4,117	51.31%	3,750	46.73%	157	1.96%
1900	4,122	50.96%	3,691	45.64%	275	3.40%
1904	4,385	52.52%	3,290	39.41%	674	8.07%
1908	3,973	47.62%	3,712	44.49%	659	7.90%
1912	2,108	28.20%	3,119	41.72%	2,249	30.08%
1916	3,761	45.73%	3,833	46.60%	631	7.67%
1920	8,100	53.67%	6,506	43.11%	487	3.23%
1924	7,437	51.42%	5,506	38.07%	1,519	10.50%
1928	8,323	58.88%	5,678	40.17%	135	0.96%
1932	6,791	42.92%	8,697	54.97%	333	2.10%
1936	7,024	44.75%	8,361	53.26%	312	1.99%
1940	9,110	55.22%	7,220	43.77%	167	1.01%
1944	8,668	57.15%	6,128	40.41%	370	2.44%
1948	8,178	52.01%	7,202	45.81%	343	2.18%
1952	10,508	61.98%	6,114	36.06%	331	1.95%
1956	11,024	64.15%	6,027	35.07%	133	0.77%
1960	10,658	59.44%	7,163	39.95%	109	0.61%
1964	7,438	44.16%	9,308	55.26%	98	0.58%
1968	9,002	54.48%	6,238	37.75%	1,283	7.76%
1972	10,858	68.48%	4,908	30.96%	89	0.56%
1976	9,182	57.78%	6,515	41.00%	193	1.21%
1980	9,497	59.59%	5,415	33.98%	1,025	6.43%
1984	10,805	69.77%	4,598	29.69%	84	0.54%
1988	11,675	74.87%	3,873	24.84%	46	0.29%
1992	9,093	56.79%	3,855	24.07%	3,065	19.14%
1996	8,275	58.79%	4,287	30.46%	1,513	10.75%
2000	10,113	69.17%	4,119	28.17%	388	2.65%
2004	11,617	74.34%	3,877	24.81%	133	0.85%
2008	10,291	62.91%	5,843	35.72%	223	1.36%
2012	10,862	68.76%	4,596	29.09%	339	2.15%
2016	11,649	71.99%	3,506	21.67%	1,026	6.34%
2020	13,147	73.57%	4,255	23.81%	468	2.62%
2024	12,990	73.05%	4,416	24.83%	377	2.12%

== Demographics ==
Historical population
Census	Pop.	Note	%±
1840	1,579		—
1850	7,850		397.2%
1860	14,867		89.4%
1870	19,036		28.0%
1880	21,805		14.5%
1890	27,644		26.8%
1900	28,901		4.5%
1910	28,982		0.3%
1920	31,671		9.3%
1930	29,073		−8.2%
1940	29,931		3.0%
1950	31,400		4.9%
1960	33,814		7.7%
1970	34,970		3.4%
1980	35,596		1.8%
1990	35,427		−0.5%
2000	38,075		7.5%
2010	37,124		−2.5%
2020	36,662		−1.2%
2025 (est.)	37,224	▲	1.5%
US Decennial Census; 1790–1960 1900–1990; 1990–2000 2010–2013

=== Racial and ethnic composition ===
Huntington County, Indiana – Racial and ethnic composition Note: the US Census treats Hispanic/Latino as an ethnic category. This table excludes Latinos from the racial categories and assigns them to a separate category. Hispanics/Latinos may be of any race.
Race / Ethnicity (NH = Non-Hispanic)	Pop 1980	Pop 1990	Pop 2000	Pop 2010	Pop 2020	% 1980	% 1990	% 2000	% 2010	% 2020
White alone (NH)	35,152	34,817	37,156	35,692	33,874	98.75%	98.28%	97.59%	96.14%	92.40%
Black or African American alone (NH)	37	50	65	155	221	0.10%	0.14%	0.17%	0.42%	0.60%
Native American or Alaska Native alone (NH)	99	151	152	124	140	0.28%	0.43%	0.40%	0.33%	0.38%
Asian alone (NH)	93	124	113	167	163	0.26%	0.35%	0.30%	0.45%	0.44%
Native Hawaiian or Pacific Islander alone (NH)	x	x	4	6	7	x	x	0.01%	0.02%	0.02%
Other race alone (NH)	23	4	15	13	83	0.06%	0.01%	0.04%	0.04%	0.23%
Mixed race or Multiracial (NH)	x	x	207	336	1,124	x	x	0.54%	0.91%	3.07%
Hispanic or Latino (any race)	192	281	363	631	1,050	0.54%	0.79%	0.95%	1.70%	2.86%
Total	35,596	35,427	38,075	37,124	36,662	100.00%	100.00%	100.00%	100.00%	100.00%

=== 2020 census ===
As of the 2020 census, the county had a population of 36,662. The median age was 41.8 years. 22.0% of residents were under the age of 18 and 19.4% of residents were 65 years of age or older. For every 100 females there were 97.1 males, and for every 100 females age 18 and over there were 94.7 males age 18 and over.

The racial makeup of the county was 93.3% White, 0.6% Black or African American, 0.5% American Indian and Alaska Native, 0.5% Asian, <0.1% Native Hawaiian and Pacific Islander, 1.0% from some other race, and 4.1% from two or more races. Hispanic or Latino residents of any race comprised 2.9% of the population.

47.9% of residents lived in urban areas, while 52.1% lived in rural areas.

There were 14,765 households in the county, of which 27.9% had children under the age of 18 living in them. Of all households, 51.2% were married-couple households, 18.0% were households with a male householder and no spouse or partner present, and 23.6% were households with a female householder and no spouse or partner present. About 28.4% of all households were made up of individuals and 12.6% had someone living alone who was 65 years of age or older.

There were 16,217 housing units, of which 9.0% were vacant. Among occupied housing units, 76.2% were owner-occupied and 23.8% were renter-occupied. The homeowner vacancy rate was 1.8% and the rental vacancy rate was 10.8%.

== 2010 census ==
As of the 2010 United States census, there were 37,124 people, 14,218 households, and 10,074 families in the county. The population density was 97.0 inhabitants per square mile (37.5/km^{2}). There were 15,805 housing units at an average density of 41.3 per square mile (15.9/km^{2}). The racial makeup of the county was 97.1% white, 0.4% Asian, 0.4% American Indian, 0.4% black or African American, 0.5% from other races, and 1.1% from two or more races. Those of Hispanic or Latino origin made up 1.7% of the population. In terms of ancestry, 37.9% were German, 14.9% were Irish, 12.9% were American, and 12.1% were English.

Of the 14,218 households, 32.3% had children under the age of 18 living with them, 56.5% were married couples living together, 9.9% had a female householder with no husband present, 29.1% were non-families, and 24.4% of all households were made up of individuals. The average household size was 2.52 and the average family size was 2.97. The median age was 39.0 years.

The median income for a household in the county was $47,697 and the median income for a family was $55,630. Males had a median income of $41,648 versus $30,218 for females. The per capita income for the county was $21,575. About 7.7% of families and 11.4% of the population were below the poverty line, including 15.6% of those under age 18 and 9.8% of those age 65 or over.

== See also ==
- National Register of Historic Places listings in Huntington County, Indiana
