= Harlansburg, Indiana =

- Unincorporated community
- Location within Indiana Location within the United States
- Coordinates: 40°48′52″N 85°33′52″W
- Country: United States
- State: Indiana
- County: Huntington
- Township: Polk
- Elevation: 810 ft (250 m)
- ZIP code: 46702
- FIPS code: 18-31445
- GNIS feature ID: 449667

Harlansburg is an unincorporated community in Polk Township, Huntington County, Indiana, United States.

== History ==
Harlansburg (also historically Harlansburgh) once had a sawmill and its own post office. The post office operated from 1879 until 1903.
