= Andrews, Indiana =

- Town
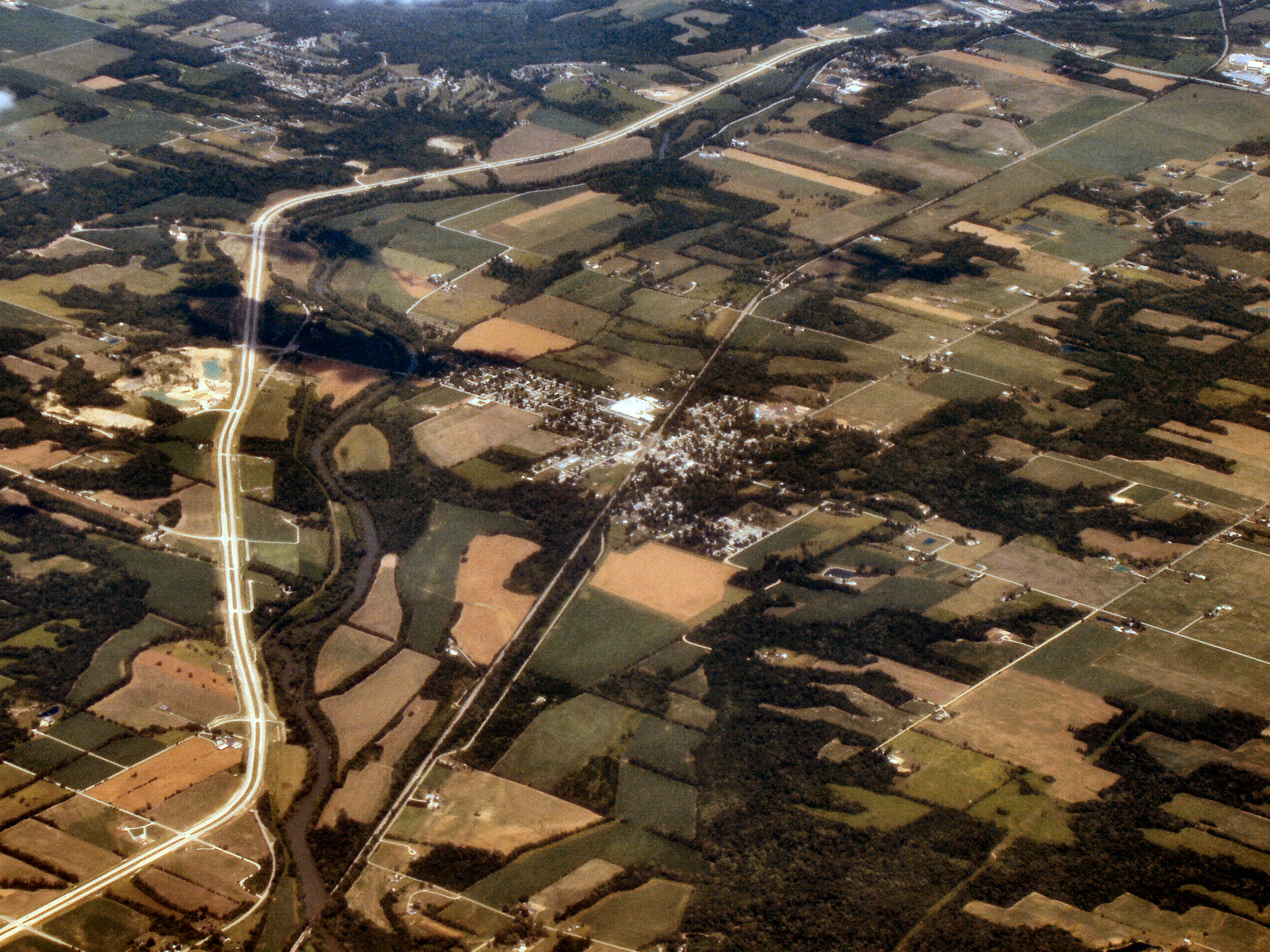
- Andrews from the air, looking northeast.

- Location of Andrews in Huntington County, Indiana.
- Coordinates: 40°51′38″N 85°36′08″W
- Country: United States
- State: Indiana
- County: Huntington
- Township: Dallas
- Platted: 1853

Area
  - Total: 0.64 sq mi (1.66 km^{2})
  - Land: 0.63 sq mi (1.64 km^{2})
  - Water: 0.0077 sq mi (0.02 km^{2})
- Elevation: 715 ft (218 m)

Population (2020)
  - Total: 1,048
  - Density: 1,652.0/sq mi (637.86/km^{2})
- Time zone: UTC−5 (EST)
  - Summer (DST): UTC−5 (EST)
- ZIP code: 46702
- Area code: 260
- FIPS code: 18-01612
- GNIS feature ID: 2397431
- Website: www.in.gov/towns/andrews/

Andrews is a town in Dallas Township, Huntington County, Indiana, United States. The population was 1,048 at the 2020 census.

== History ==
Andrews was originally called Antioch, and under the latter name was platted in 1853. It was renamed Andrews in the 1880s, in honor of a railroad official, at the time when the railroad was built through the community.

== Geography ==
According to the 2010 census, Andrews has a total area of 0.66 square miles (1.71 km^{2}), of which 0.65 square miles (1.68 km^{2}) (or 98.48%) is land and 0.01 square miles (0.03 km^{2}) (or 1.52%) is water.

== Demographics ==
Historical population
Census	Pop.	Note	%±
1870	449		—
1880	454		1.1%
1890	1,390		206.2%
1900	746		−46.3%
1910	957		28.3%
1920	1,071		11.9%
1930	883		−17.6%
1940	954		8.0%
1950	1,083		13.5%
1960	1,132		4.5%
1970	1,207		6.6%
1980	1,243		3.0%
1990	1,118		−10.1%
2000	1,290		15.4%
2010	1,149		−10.9%
2020	1,048		−8.8%
U.S. Decennial Census

=== 2020 census ===
As of the 2020 census, Andrews had a population of 1,048. The median age was 39.7 years. 25.5% of residents were under the age of 18 and 15.5% of residents were 65 years of age or older. For every 100 females there were 101.5 males, and for every 100 females age 18 and over there were 97.2 males age 18 and over.

0.0% of residents lived in urban areas, while 100.0% lived in rural areas.

There were 429 households in Andrews, of which 30.1% had children under the age of 18 living in them. Of all households, 39.6% were married-couple households, 23.8% were households with a male householder and no spouse or partner present, and 26.3% were households with a female householder and no spouse or partner present. About 31.2% of all households were made up of individuals and 11.4% had someone living alone who was 65 years of age or older.

There were 493 housing units, of which 13.0% were vacant. The homeowner vacancy rate was 2.9% and the rental vacancy rate was 19.4%.

Racial composition as of the 2020 census
Race	Number	Percent
White	966	92.2%
Black or African American	1	0.1%
American Indian and Alaska Native	5	0.5%
Asian	3	0.3%
Native Hawaiian and Other Pacific Islander	0	0.0%
Some other race	8	0.8%
Two or more races	65	6.2%
Hispanic or Latino (of any race)	49	4.7%

=== 2010 census ===
As of the census of 2010, there were 1,149 people, 435 households, and 302 families living in the town. The population density was 1,767.7 inhabitants per square mile (682.5/km^{2}). There were 512 housing units at an average density of 787.7 per square mile (304.1/km^{2}). The racial makeup of the town was 96.3% White, 0.3% African American, 1.0% Native American, 0.3% Asian, 0.1% from other races, and 1.8% from two or more races. Hispanic or Latino of any race were 1.9% of the population.

There were 435 households, of which 38.2% had children under the age of 18 living with them, 51.3% were married couples living together, 12.2% had a female householder with no husband present, 6.0% had a male householder with no wife present, and 30.6% were non-families. 24.8% of all households were made up of individuals, and 10.4% had someone living alone who was 65 years of age or older. The average household size was 2.64 and the average family size was 3.10.

The median age in the town was 36.4 years. 27.7% of residents were under the age of 18; 9.1% were between the ages of 18 and 24; 24.7% were from 25 to 44; 26.2% were from 45 to 64; and 12.3% were 65 years of age or older. The gender makeup of the town was 51.1% male and 48.9% female.

=== 2000 census ===
As of the census of 2000, there were 1,290 people, 470 households, and 351 families living in the town. The population density was 2,602.2 inhabitants per square mile (1,004.7/km^{2}). There were 534 housing units at an average density of 1,077.2 per square mile (415.9/km^{2}). The racial makeup of the town was 97.05% White, 0.08% African American, 1.09% Native American, 0.16% Asian, 0.08% from other races, and 1.55% from two or more races. Hispanic or Latino of any race were 2.17% of the population.

There were 470 households, out of which 37.7% had children under the age of 18 living with them, 57.7% were married couples living together, 11.3% had a female householder with no husband present, and 25.3% were non-families. 20.0% of all households were made up of individuals, and 7.4% had someone living alone who was 65 years of age or older. The average household size was 2.74 and the average family size was 3.16.

In the town, the population was spread out, with 31.0% under the age of 18, 7.0% from 18 to 24, 31.5% from 25 to 44, 19.1% from 45 to 64, and 11.5% who were 65 years of age or older. The median age was 33 years. For every 100 females, there were 102.8 males. For every 100 females age 18 and over, there were 98.7 males.

The median income for a household in the town was $35,125, and the median income for a family was $36,150. Males had a median income of $30,580 versus $19,891 for females. The per capita income for the town was $15,198. About 6.2% of families and 8.2% of the population were below the poverty line, including 9.0% of those under age 18 and 9.4% of those age 65 or over.

== Education ==
The town has a lending library, the Andrews-Dallas Township Public Library.
