= Chris Schenkel =

American sportscaster (1923–2005)

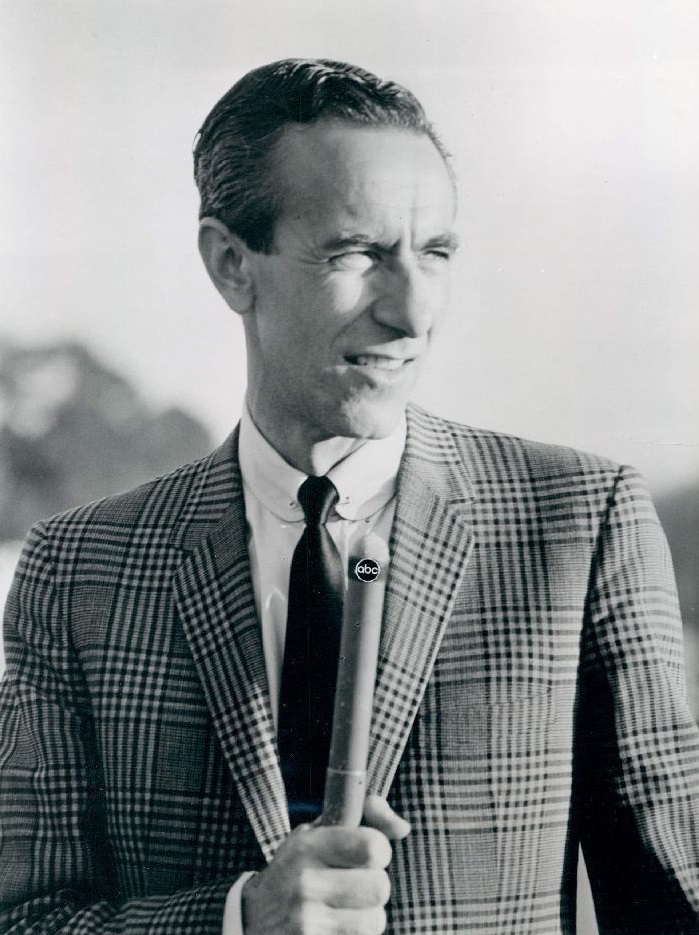
- Schenkel in 1964
- Born: Christopher Eugune Schenkel; August 21, 1923; Bippus, Indiana, U.S.
- Died: September 11, 2005 (aged 82); Fort Wayne, Indiana, U.S.
- Occupation: Sportscaster
- Years active: 1947−1997
- Spouse: Fran Paige (m. 1955)
- Children: 3

Christopher Eugene Schenkel (August 21, 1923 – September 11, 2005) was an American sportscaster. Over the course of five decades he called play-by-play for numerous sports on television and radio, becoming known for his smooth delivery and baritone voice. In 1964, he did a final scene voiceover of Lyndon B. Johnson's controversial "Daisy" advertisement.

== Early life and career ==
Schenkel was born on August 21, 1923, to second-generation immigrant parents on their farm in Bippus, Indiana. He was one of six children. He began his broadcasting career at radio station WBAA while studying for a premedical degree at Purdue University where he was a member of the Phi Sigma Kappa fraternity. He served in the U.S. Army during World War II and the Korean War. He worked in radio for a time at WLBC in Muncie, Indiana. and then moved to television, in Providence, Rhode Island, and in 1947 began announcing Harvard football games. For six years he did local radio and called the Thoroughbred horse races at Narragansett Park.

In 1952, Schenkel was hired by the DuMont Television Network, for which he broadcast New York Giants football and hosted DuMont's Boxing From Eastern Parkway (1953–1954) and Boxing From St. Nicholas Arena (1954–56), replacing Dennis James as the network's primary boxing announcer. Schenkel was at the microphone for DuMont's last broadcast and its only color telecast, a high school football championship game held on Thanksgiving in 1957.

In 1956, with DuMont exiting the network television business, he moved to CBS Sports, where he continued to call Giants games, along with boxing, Triple Crown horse racing and The Masters golf tournament, among other events. Along with Chuck Thompson, Schenkel called the 1958 NFL Championship Game for NBC. He was the voiceover talent for the first NFL Films production ever made, the 1962 NFL Championship Game between the Green Bay Packers and the New York Giants, also doing the play by play for the game on NBC with Ray Scott. Schenkel announced five of the six NFL title games from 1958 to 1963 on NBC, as the Giants played in all five.

== ABC Sports ==
ABC Sports hired Schenkel in 1965, and there he broadcast college football, Major League Baseball, NBA basketball, golf and tennis tournaments, boxing, auto racing, and the Summer and Winter Olympic Games. He became widely known for covering professional bowling, mainly for the Professional Bowlers Association (with the program becoming known as the Professional Bowlers Tour). He covered bowling from the early 1960s until 1997, as it became one of ABC's signature sports for Saturday afternoons. His broadcast partners on the PBA telecasts included Billy Welu (through 1974) and Nelson "Bo" Burton Jr. (1975–97). Schenkel and his broadcast team provided exciting and colorful coverage to a sport not typically considered attractive to a television audience. From the late 1960s to the early 1980s, Pro Bowlers Tour typically outdrew college football and college basketball in the ratings. Many viewers considered it a weekly tradition to watch bowling on Saturday afternoons, which was a lead-in to ABC's Wide World of Sports.

During his 36 years on The Professional Bowlers Tour, there were occasions when ABC sent Schenkel away to cover other assignments. Strangely, he was away on assignment for the first three of the PBA's televised 300 games. Given that Schenkel was in the broadcast booth for three televised 299 games in the 1970s, light-hearted conversation circulated among the PBA faithful that Schenkel was a "curse" for anyone with a chance to shoot a perfect game on television. He would eventually call a televised 300 game on January 31, 1987, when Houstonian Pete McCordic bowled one in the first match of the Greater Los Angeles Open. Schenkel told McCordic it was a great moment for him, since he was away all the other times. Schenkel would be in the ABC booth for five more televised 300 games. Schenkel was also away the first time the 7-10 split was converted on television by Mark Roth.

== Honors ==
In 1971, Statesboro, Georgia, businessman Charlie Robbins honored Schenkel by developing in his name, a scholarship for golf at Georgia Southern University and calling the great classic, "Chris Schenkel Intercollegiate Golf Tournament", featuring some of the nation's top college golf teams. Schenkel had attended then named Georgia Teacher's College (1930–1958) while in the service near Statesboro during WW II. There are a few books in the School's library today with Schenkel's signed name listed as the one checking out the library book. The Schenkel Tournament ended after the 1989 event when it was discovered that the golf club hosting the tournament was all-white, but was revived in 1999 as the E-Z-Go Schenkel Invitational. This college event is regarded as one of golf's premier intercollegiate events in the East.

Chris Schenkel also did play-by-play (with Bud Wilkinson providing color commentary) for the legendary 1969 Texas vs. Arkansas football game, known as a "Game of the Century," culminating the first 100 years of College Football in 1969. The game garnered a share of 52.1, meaning that more than one half of the televisions in the United States were tuned in. Years later, Schenkel said "it was the most exciting, most important college football game I ever televised". Schenkel went on to broadcast many more huge games, including the celebrated Nebraska-Oklahoma match on Thanksgiving Day 1971, as well as the Sugar Bowl national championship showdown between Notre Dame and Alabama on New Year's Eve 1973 (with Wilkinson and Howard Cosell, in a rare college football appearance). Schenkel was replaced by Keith Jackson as ABC's lead play-by-play man for college football telecasts in 1974, but continued to call college football games for several more years.

He was the spokesman for Owens-Illinois's "Good Taste of Beer" advertising campaign which began in 1975 and continued through the remainder of the decade.

In 1975, he received the Golden Plate Award of the American Academy of Achievement.

In 1976, Schenkel was inducted into the PBA Hall of Fame in the "Meritorious Service" category and in 1988 was inducted into the American Bowling Congress (now United States Bowling Congress) Hall of Fame, also in the "Meritorious Service" category.

Schenkel was inducted in 1981 in the National Sportscasters and Sportswriters Association Hall of Fame.

He was named National Sportscaster of the Year four times, and in 1992 received a lifetime achievement Emmy Award. Also in 1992, the Pro Football Hall of Fame presented Schenkel with its Pete Rozelle Radio-Television Award. In 1999, he received the Jim Thorpe Lifetime Achievement Award.

In 1996, the National Football Foundation created an award in his honor, given annually to distinctive individuals in broadcasting with ties to a university.

In 1999, the Professional Bowlers Association named the Player of the Year award after Schenkel.

In a 2009 vote by its members, the American Sportscasters Association ranked Schenkel 25th on its list of the Top 50 Sportscasters of All-Time.

In a 2010 podcast, comedian Chris Hardwick (son of former pro-bowler Billy Hardwick) claimed he was named after Schenkel.

== Personal life and death ==
He was married to former dancer and model Fran Paige.

Schenkel had three children, Christina, Ted, and John. He also had three grandchildren, Christopher, Michael, and Katie.

Chris resided on Tippecanoe Lake in Leesburg, Indiana.

In 1971, Schenkel, a longtime friend of Indianapolis Motor Speedway owner Tony Hulman, was a passenger in the pace car for that year's Indianapolis 500 race. Astronaut John Glenn and Hulman were also in the car when its driver, Indianapolis-area Dodge dealer Eldon Palmer, crashed the 1971 Dodge Challenger convertible into a camera platform at the beginning of the race.

Schenkel died of emphysema in 2005 at the age of 82. He is interred at Saint Johns United Church of Christ Cemetery in Bippus, Indiana.

== Other appearances ==
Schenkel appeared (along with Bo Burton) as the bowling announcers in the final match in the 1979 movie Dreamer.

Schenkel appeared as himself in the 1996 film Kingpin. He played the role of play-by-play announcer in the final match between characters Ernie McCracken and Roy Munson.

Another appearance was in the 1994 film Greedy. He played himself as an announcer of a bowling tournament early in the movie.

Schenkel's voice can be heard in the "Daisy" ad for Lyndon B. Johnson in the 1964 U.S. presidential election campaign.

Chris Shenkel was Host of the 1999 Film, "Three Rivers In Time," written, produced and directed by former Aurora, Indiana resident Dennis Neary.

Preceded by Charlie Brockman	Television voice of the Indianapolis 500; 1966	Succeeded by Jim McKay
Preceded by None	Lead play-by-play announcer, ABC NCAA Football; 1966-1973	Succeeded by Keith Jackson
Preceded by Bob Wolff	Play-by-Play announcer, NBA Finals; 1966–1971 (with Bob Wolff in 1966 and 1969)	Succeeded by Keith Jackson
Preceded by Bill Henry	American television prime time anchor, Summer Olympic Games; 1968–1972	Succeeded by Jim McKay
Preceded by Jim McKay	American television prime time anchor, Winter Olympic Games; 1968	Succeeded by Curt Gowdy
Preceded by Jack Buck (in 1961)	Lead play-by-play announcer, Major League Baseball on ABC; 1965	Succeeded by Bob Prince (in 1976)
