= Indiana State Road 114 =

State highway in Indiana, United States

State Road 114
- SR 114 highlighted in red

Route information
- Maintained by INDOT
- Length: 70.788 mi (113.922 km)

Western segment
- Length: 28.708 mi (46.201 km)
- West end: US 41 near Morocco
- Major intersections: I-65 near Rensselaer; US 231 in Rensselaer
- East end: US 421 north of Monon

Central segment
- Length: 5.832 mi (9.386 km)
- West end: SR 17 near Kewanna
- East end: SR 25 in Fulton

Eastern segment
- Length: 36.246 mi (58.332 km)
- West end: SR 14 in Akron
- East end: US 24 near Fort Wayne

Location
- Country: United States
- State: Indiana
- Counties: Fulton, Huntington, Jasper, Newton, Pulaski, Wabash, Whitley

Highway system
- Indiana State Highway System; Interstate; US; State; Scenic
| ← SR 111 | → SR 115 |

State Road 114 (SR 114) is an east–west state road, that consists of three discontinuous sections, in the northern part of the US state of Indiana. The western portion of SR 114 is just under 29 miles (47 km) long and is routed between U.S. Highway 41 (US 41) and US 421. The central segment runs through rural Fulton County; it is approximately 5.8 miles (9.3 km) long and connects SR 17 at the west end with SR 25 at the east end. The eastern portion of SR 114 is just over 36 miles (58 km) long and is routed between SR 14 and US 24. SR 114 mostly passes rural agriculture land, but passes through a few towns and small cities.

The SR 114 designation was first used in the early 1930s along the route between SR 14 and SR 5, a route that later became SR 113. In the early to mid 1930s the eastern segment was rerouted to its modern route and the western segment was added, running between Illinois state line and SR 43. The central segment of SR 114 was commissioned in the early to mid 1950s along a similar route as it is today, but was north of the modern route. By 1960 the central segment was moved onto its current alignment. The entire roadway was paved by 1971. The western end was moved from the Illinois state line to US 41 in the late 2000s or early 2010s.

== Route description ==
=== Western section ===
SR 114 begins at a J-turn type intersection with US 41 on the southeast town limits of Morocco, in Newton County. The road heads east passing through farmland before crossing into Jasper County and having an interchange with Interstate 65 (I-65). Past I-65, SR 114 passes south of the Jasper County Airport before entering Rensselaer, on Clark Street. The street passes through mostly residential properties before SR 114 turns southeasterly on Cullen Street. Cullen Street heads through downtown having an intersection with US 231 (Washington Street), on the north side of the Jasper County Court House. Past the courthouse SR 114 turns east onto Grace Street, passing the Rensselaer Central High school before leaving the city. East of Rensselaer SR 114 crosses over the Iroquois River and through agriculture land. The road enters Pulaski County before ending at a three-way intersection with US 421.

=== Central section ===
The central segment of SR 114 begins at a three-way intersection with SR 17, in rural Fulton County. SR 114 heads east towards Fulton passing farms and fields. The road bends southeasterly and enters the town of Fulton, concurrent with Center Street. The SR 114 designation ends at the intersection of Center Street and Liberty Avenue (SR 25), while SR 114 ends the roadway continues southeasterly as Center Street.

=== Eastern section ===
The eastern segment of SR 114 begins on the eastern edge of Akron, at a three-way intersection with SR 14. SR 114 heads towards the southeast leaving Akron and entering rural Fulton County, passing agriculture land. The road enters Wabash County and becomes east–west and has a rural intersections with SR 15. The road enters North Manchester having an intersection with SR 13 and begins to passes through a commercial area before curving onto Main Street. Main Street crosses a NS railroad track, while continuing through commercial properties, before passing through the North Manchester Historic District. East of the historic district SR 114 crosses over Eel River before leaving North Manchester. The road east of North Manchester passes through farms and fields before leaving Wabash County. After leaving Wabash County SR 114 becomes the county line between Huntington and Whitley Counties. While being the dividing line between the two counties SR 114 has rural intersections with SR 105, SR 5, and SR 9. The landscape becomes a little more wooded before the eastern end of SR 114, at an intersection with US 24, southwest of Fort Wayne.

== History ==
SR 114 was first designated a state road in late 1931, this route was south of its modern eastern segment. It ran from SR 14 in Akron south-southeast to SR 5 east of Bippus, this route was originally part of SR 5 in early 1931. During 1932 SR 114 moved to modern route running from SR 14 in Akron to SR 9, this resulted in the original route of SR 114 becoming SR 113. At this time the road Between SR 9 and US 24 was a proposed addition. In late 1932 or early 1933 the western segment SR 114, between Illinois state line and SR 43 (now US 421), was authorized to be added to the state road system. SR 114 officially became a state road between SR 9 and US 24 between 1933 and 1934. By 1936 the western segment of SR 114 was officially added to the state road system as a gravel road surface.

The central segment of SR 114 was added to the state road system routed between SR 17 and SR 25, passing through Bluegrass, in either 1952 or 1953. By 1960 the central segment was realigned to its modern routing and paved. SR 114 east of SR 13 was paved between 1962 and 1963. Within the next few years SR 114 west of US 41, to the Illinois state line was paved. The rest of the western segment was paved between 1966 and 1967, while the road within Wabash County was paved. The last segment of roadway to be paved was the eastern segment, within Fulton County, and it was paved in either 1970 or 1971. Between 2009 and 2011 the western end of SR 114 was moved from the Illinois state line to US 41, the former route of SR 114 became a county road. In 2015 the intersection at US 41 and SR 114 became a restricted crossing U-turn type of intersection which was the first such type of intersection within the state of Indiana.

== Major intersections ==
| County | Location | mi | km | Destinations | Notes |
|---|---|---|---|---|---|
| Newton | Morocco | 0.000 | 0.000 | US 41 – Terre Haute, Hammond | Western terminus of SR 114 |
| Newton | Mount Ayr | 7.294 | 11.739 | SR 55 – Fowler, Crown Point | |
| Jasper | Newton Township | 11.135– 11.286 | 17.920– 18.163 | I-65 – Indianapolis, Chicago | |
| Jasper | Rensselaer | 15.045 | 24.213 | US 231 (Washington Street) | |
| Pulaski | Salem Township | 28.708 | 46.201 | US 421 – Michigan City, Monon | Eastern terminus of the western section of SR 114 |
Gap in route
| Fulton | Wayne Township | 28.709 | 46.203 | SR 17 – Kewanna, Grass Creek, Logansport | Western terminus of the middle section of SR 114 |
| Fulton | Fulton | 34.541 | 55.588 | SR 25 – Logansport, Rochester | Eastern terminus of the middle section of SR 114 |
Gap in route
| Fulton | Akron | 34.542 | 55.590 | SR 14 | Western terminus of the eastern section of SR 114 |
| Wabash | Pleasant Township | 42.296 | 68.069 | SR 15 – Wabash, Warsaw | |
| Wabash | North Manchester | 47.296 | 76.116 | SR 13 – Wabash, Syracuse | |
| Whitley–Huntington county line | Cleveland–Warren township line | 56.248 | 90.522 | SR 105 – South Whitley, Bippus | |
| Whitley–Huntington county line | Cleveland–Warren township line | 58.885 | 94.766 | SR 5 – Huntington | |
| Whitley–Huntington county line | Washington–Clear Creek township line | 64.251 | 103.402 | SR 9 – Huntington, Columbia City | |
| Whitley–Huntington county line | Jefferson–Jackson township line | 70.788 | 113.922 | US 24 – Fort Wayne, Roanoke | Eastern terminus of SR 114 |
1.000 mi = 1.609 km; 1.000 km = 0.621 mi
