= Process Communication Model (psychology) =

Process Communication Model (PCM) is a relationship management tool created by American psychologist Taibi Kahler, developed within the school of transactional analysis.

== History ==
Taibi Kahler was born in 1943 in Kewanna, Indiana. He earned a PhD in child development and family life from Purdue University in 1972. A psychotherapy practitioner and member of the International Transactional Analysis Association (ITAA), he began in the early 1970s observing human interactions second by second, building on Eric Berne's work on life scripts. He identified brief, repetitive behaviors, which he called "drivers," that systematically preceded behaviors of distress. These observations led to the concept of the miniscript, published in the Transactional Analysis Journal in 1974 with Hedges Capers, and further developed in "Drivers: The Key to the Process of Scripts" in 1975. For this work he received the Eric Berne Memorial Scientific Award in 1977, given by the ITAA for the year's most significant scientific contribution in the field.

From the late 1970s, Kahler was invited by Dr. Terence McGuire, chief psychiatrist for human spaceflight at NASA, to observe astronaut selection interviews. McGuire found that Kahler could produce a behavioral profile in about ten minutes of observation as accurate as the one McGuire himself obtained after several hours of interviews. The model was used by NASA for close to two decades to assess the psychological compatibility of crews and help prevent conflict during missions. The Process Communication Model differs from other personal development methods in its focus on the relationship to oneself and others through directly observable behavior.

The Process Communication Model differs from other personal development methods in its focus on the relationship to oneself and others through directly observable behavior.

== Description ==
=== Six personality types and three degrees of stress ===
According to Kahler, every person contains all six personality types. He holds that each type carries a certain amount of stress, for which PCM offers an antidote. Each type has a name:

1. Thinker
2. Persister
3. Rebel
4. Promoter
5. Harmonizer
6. Imaginer

The questionnaire Kahler developed assesses the ranking of personality types by available energy level, along with participants' success and failure mechanisms. The six types are represented as a stack, known as the "building," in which the dominant type is called the "Base." According to Kahler, the Base is fixed around age seven and remains constant for life. The "Phase," by contrast, which drives a person's motivations and most observable behavior under stress, can shift over a lifetime, particularly during a period of intense stress, whether positive or negative, in what is termed a "Phase change".

PCM's degrees of stress describe a progressive decline in a person's relational, emotional and cognitive capacities. The model holds that this process starts with mild stress behaviors, barely noticeable within a relationship, and can develop into more pronounced communication breakdowns and eventually deeper forms of distress.

- The first degree, called the Driver, can be understood as a "constraining message".
- The second degree, called the failure mechanism, consists of repetitive negative behaviors that reinforce relational difficulties.
- The third degree, called despair, refers to a deeper state of stress in which communication breaks down entirely.

The PCM profile is meant to identify the psychological needs tied to a person's Phase. The model holds that regularly meeting these needs helps lower stress and supports more effective communication. Outside periods of intense stress, the psychological needs of the Base are met unconsciously.

=== Managing miscommunication ===
PCM offers tools for managing relationships and stress behavior. For each personality type, an interaction is said to involve three elements:

- perception of the world
- preferred communication channel
- the psychological need to be met

==== Psychological needs ====
This is considered PCM's central tool for managing stress. Just as meeting physiological needs supports physical health, meeting psychological needs is said to help a person move out of stress.

==== Perception of the world ====
A person's Base is said to shape how they see the world, communicate and manage relationships with others. Taking this worldview into account can improve communication with another person.

==== Communication channels ====
A communication channel covers everything used to convey a message, including tone of voice, body language such as facial expression, gestures and posture, and word choice. The model identifies five communication channels, with each personality type having a preferred one:

- the interruptive channel, used mainly in situations of intense stress or when it is necessary to interrupt inappropriate behavior firmly and constructively. It is rarely used day to day.
- the directive channel, suited to people with a Promoter or Imaginer Base. It relies on action oriented phrasing using imperative verbs, with a neutral tone and attitude.
- the interrogative channel, suited to people with a Persister or Thinker Base. It favors facts or opinions, often framed as questions, delivered in a neutral tone with a measured manner and upright posture.
- the nurturing channel, suited to people with a Harmonizer Base. It draws on emotional vocabulary, a soft tone of voice and a warm, relaxed, other focused attitude.
- the emotive channel, suited to people with a Rebel Base. It is marked by exclamations, expressive words, an enthusiastic tone and lively gestures.

== Research ==
Since the 2020s, PCM has been the subject of academic work in cognitive psychology and behavioral neuroscience. This research has examined whether the model's underlying assumptions correspond to observable variation in certain cognitive functions or social interactions.

A 2023 study published in PLOS One examined 77 participants on a global and local visual processing task. Four of the six PCM profiles showed a typical pattern of visual processing, while two profiles, Rebel and Imaginer, stood apart from the rest, a result the authors describe as consistent with some of the model's assumptions while noting the need for replication on a larger sample.

A second study, published in 2024 in Frontiers in Psychology by Lefebvre and Anaëlle Camarda, examined creative idea generation in 102 participants using a standardized task. The Imaginer profile produced more ideas than the other five profiles, which did not differ significantly from one another. The authors propose the model as a possible framework for studying individual differences in certain creative processes.

A third study, published in 2025 in Cognition and Emotion by Lefebvre and Virginie Beaucousin, measured skin conductance in 90 participants during simulated communication exchanges. Only the Persister profile differed significantly from the other profiles in its emotional responses.

== Criticism ==
Piet van der Ploeg, who teaches at the Amsterdam University of Applied Sciences, wrote in 2016 that the studies cited by PCM's advocates are often difficult to locate or inaccessible, and that the ones that can be checked are generally unreliable or fail to support the method's effectiveness.

A 1995 study by Hawking, carried out in three schools, found no significant difference in two of them, and none for boys in any of the three. A 2006 study by Appold concluded that exposure to PCM had not been sufficient to produce reliable results.

Van der Ploeg also finds that Kahler cites a 1992 study by Wallin while misrepresenting its conclusions. Wallin found that a student's grade is influenced by personality, sex and ethnic background, but Kahler's account of the study introduces a claim about personality structure differences between teacher and student that does not appear in the original. Van der Ploeg argues that a need to amplify and distort research findings points to a lack of genuine supporting evidence.

== Bibliography ==
- Lefebvre, Sixtine; Beaucousin, Virginie (March 2025). "Emotional responses during communicational comfort: the effect of personality through the prism of process communication model". Cognition & Emotion. doi:10.1080/02699931.2025.2487521.
- Lefebvre, Sixtine; Camarda, Anaëlle (June 2024). "Creative ideas generation and personality: evidence from process communication model". Frontiers in Psychology. doi:10.3389/fpsyg.2024.1403714.
- Andrew, Marion I.; Wilkinson, Stephen; Wylie, Nicole; Salter, Amy (April 2021). "Evaluation of Process Communication Model training for surgeons and other healthcare professionals: a survey". ANZ Journal of Surgery. doi:10.1111/ans.16351. PMC 8252375.
- Trouvé, L.; Mouriaux, F.; Boulogne, A.; Lejay, A.; Dormégny, L.; Kuntz, S.; Sauer, A.; Gaucher, D.; Chakfé, N.; Bourcier, T. (February 2025). "How do patients define a good ophthalmologist? A survey from an academic medical center in France". Journal Français d'Ophtalmologie (in French). doi:10.1016/j.jfo.2024.104354.
- Oprea, Raluca Corina; Andersson, Frédéric; Gissot, Valérie; Desmidt, Thomas; Siragusa, Marta; Barantin, Laurent; Dubourg, Patrice; El-Hage, Wissam (February 2025). "Neural correlates of communication modes in medical students using fMRI". Brain Imaging and Behavior. doi:10.1007/s11682-025-00985-z.
- Lefebvre, Sixtine; Beaucousin, Virginie (April 2023). "Seeing the forest or the tree depends on personality: Evidence from process communication model during global/local visual search task". PLOS One. doi:10.1371/journal.pone.0284596.
- Hady, Anna (2020). "Building relationships at school by responding to the individual needs of students and teachers using the Process Communication Model". Educational Transactional Analysis Journal. doi:10.16926/eat.2020.09.03.
- Alkipsy, Ensejam; Hanston, Edwin; Raju, Valliappan (2023). "Comprehending the Value of Process Communication Model (PCM): in the Context of Management, Personal, Inter-Culture and Scientific Perspectives". Journal of Reproducible Research. 1 (1): 103–108.
- Woś-Szymanowska, Agnieszka (2018). "Process Communication Model – skuteczne narzędzie wspierające edukację". Edukacyjna Analiza Transakcyjna (in Polish). 7: 15–26. doi:10.16926/eat.2018.07.01.
