= Indiana State Road 16 =

State highway in Indiana, United States

State Road 16
- SR 16 highlighted in red

Route information
- Maintained by INDOT
- Length: 105.171 mi (169.256 km)
- Existed: October 1, 1926–present

Major junctions
- West end: US 41 at Ade
- US 421 at Monon; US 35 at Royal Center; US 31 west of Denver
- East end: SR 5 at Huntington

Location
- Country: United States
- State: Indiana
- Counties: Newton, Jasper, White, Cass, Miami, Wabash, Huntington

Highway system
- Indiana State Highway System; Interstate; US; State; Scenic
← SR 15	→ SR 17

State Road 16 (SR 16) is an east–west state road in the US state of Indiana. The western terminus is at an intersection with U.S. Highway 41 (US 41), near Ade, and its eastern terminus is at SR 5, near Huntington. The state road runs through seven counties in northern Indiana mostly through rural farm fields and small towns.

Dating back to the early days of the state road system, SR 16 was first signed in the southern part of the state. It was moved to northern Indiana in 1926, running in two segments with the western segment being modern SR 14 from Illinois state line to Rochester and the eastern segment being modern US 224 in Indiana. During the 1930s, SR 16 was moved onto its modern routing from US 41 to SR 5. US 224 replaced SR 16 east of Huntington in the mid-1930s. The final section of SR 16 to be paved, the segment of roadway in Wabash County, was paved in the late 1960s.

== Route description ==
SR 16 begins at US 41 at an intersection in rural Newton County, just east of Ade. The state road heads east as a two-lane rural highway passing farms and fields, before passing through the town of Brook. East of Brook SR 16 passes over the Iroquois River and through an intersection with SR 55, before crossing into Jasper County. In Jasper County SR 16 crosses over Interstate 65, before an intersection with US 231. Past US 231 the road passes through rural Jasper county before entering White County.

In White County SR 16 crosses over a CSX railroad track before entering Monon. In Monon SR 16 passes mostly houses, before an intersection with US 421. East of US 421 the road crosses another CSX railroad track before passing between North White High School and Monon Elementary School. SR 16 leaves Monon passing through agricultural land in rural White County. The road makes a sharp curve to become north–south before a four-way intersection with SR 39 and 900 North. At this intersection SR 16 and SR 39 head east entering the community of Buffalo. In Buffalo the concurrency turns south and crosses over Tippecanoe River. After the river SR 16 turns east while SR 39 continues south, at this intersection SR 119 begins concurrent with SR 16. SR 16 and SR 119 heads east leaving Buffalo before SR 119 bends north while SR 16 turns south. The road heads south for a mile before a four-way intersection with two county roads, at this intersection SR 16 turns to become east–west. SR 16 leaves White County and enters Cass County.

In Cass County SR 16 passes through Royal Center and an intersection with US 35. Past Royal Center the route passes through farmland in rural Cass County and through an intersections with SR 17 and SR 25 before leaving Cass County and entering Miami County. In Miami County SR 16 has an intersection with US 31, before SR 16 passes through Denver. Past Denver SR 16 turns north concurrent with SR 19 for about 3 miles (4.8 km). The concurrency ends with SR 16 turning east while SR 19 continues north. SR 16 crosses over the Eel River as the road leaves Miami County and enters Wabash County.

The road passes through Roann before passing through agricultural land in Wabash County. In rural Wabash County SR 16 has an intersection with SR 15 followed by an intersection with SR 13. Past SR 13, SR 16 leaves Wabash County and enters Huntington County. In Huntington County SR 16 has an intersection with SR 105 before passing through wood and farm land. The SR 16 designation ends at an intersection with SR 5 in rural Huntington County, northwest of the city of Huntington, while the roadway continues east as a county road.

== History ==
Before 1926 the SR 16 designation was routed between Mount Vernon and New Albany, along a similar routing as modern SR 62. In 1926 SR 16 designation was in two segments, between Illinois state line and Rochester, via Winamac, along modern SR 14. The second segment added to the state road system in 1926 was routed from Huntington to the Ohio state line, along modern US 224. The segment of SR 16 from Illinois state line to Rochester was redesignated as SR 14 between 1928 and 1929. In late 1930 SR 16 was added between US 41 and modern US 231, with the road from modern US 231 to modern SR 15 becoming an authorized addition. Between late 1930 and 1932 SR 16 between SR 29 (now US 35), in Royal Center, and SR 15 (now SR 13), near Urbana, was commissioned. In this time frame SR 16 between US 41 and SR 53, now US 231, was under construction to become a high type of roadway.

During 1932 SR 16 was commissioned between SR 15 and SR 5, while the roadway between US 41 and SR 53 was opened as a high type road surface. Between late 1932 and early 1933 SR 16 between Huntington and Markle was under construction as a high type road surface. US 224 replaced SR 16, between Huntington and the Ohio state line, between 1933 and 1934. In either 1934 or 1935 the road between US 152 (now US 231), and US 35 became an authorized addition to the state road system. The route between US 152 and US 35 was added to the state road system between 1936 and 1937. The entire roadway of SR 16 was paved between 1963 and 1964, excluding the roadway in Wabash County. The segment of roadway in Wabash County was paved in either 1966 and 1967.

== Major intersections ==
County	Location	mi	km	Destinations	Notes
Newton	Ade	0.000	0.000	US 41 – Kentland, Hammond, Willow Slough	Western terminus of SR 16.
Newton	Iroquois Township	6.789	10.926	SR 55 – Fowler, Crown Point	
Jasper	Jordan Township	14.760	23.754	US 231 to I-65 – Remington, Rensselaer	
White	Monon	29.231	47.043	US 421 – Reynolds, Michigan City	
White	Buffalo	35.546	57.206	SR 39 north – North Judson	Western end of SR 39 concurrency
White	Buffalo	37.195	59.860	SR 39 south / SR 119 north – Monticello	Eastern end of SR 39 concurrency; western end SR 119 concurrency; southern end of SR 119
White	Cass Township	41.762	67.209	SR 119 north – Winamac	Eastern end of SR 119 concurrency
Cass	Royal Center	50.950	81.996	US 35 – Logansport, Winamac	
Cass	Harrison Township	57.613	92.719	SR 17	
Cass	Bethlehem Township	60.835	97.904	SR 25 – Logansport, Rochester	
Miami	Union Township	70.128	112.860	US 31	
Miami	Richland Township	75.941	122.215	SR 19 south	Southern end of SR 19 concurrency
Miami	Richland Township	79.078	127.264	SR 19 north – Akron	Northern end of SR 19 concurrency
Wabash	Paw Paw Township	86.370	138.999	SR 15 – Wabash, Warsaw	
Wabash	Paw Paw Township	91.39	147.08	SR 13 – Wabash, Sidney	
Huntington	Warren Township	100.324	161.456	SR 105	
Huntington	Huntington–Clear Creek township line	105.171	169.256	SR 5 – South Whitley, Huntington	Eastern terminus of SR 16
1.000 mi = 1.609 km; 1.000 km = 0.621 mi: Concurrency terminus
