= Indiana State Road 17 =

State highway in Indiana, United States

State Road 17
- SR 17 highlighted in red

Route information
- Maintained by INDOT
- Length: 50.705 mi (81.602 km)
- Existed: 1932–present

Major junctions
- South end: SR 25 at Logansport
- North end: US 30 at Plymouth

Location
- Country: United States
- State: Indiana
- Counties: Cass, Fulton, Marshall

Highway system
- Indiana State Highway System; Interstate; US; State; Scenic
← SR 16	→ SR 18

State Road 17 is a north–south road in Northern Indiana. Its southern terminus is at State Road 25 in Logansport. Its northern terminus is at U.S. Route 30 in Plymouth.

== Route description ==
SR 17 southern terminus is in Logansport at eastbound SR 25 (East Market Street). One block north SR 17 meets the westbound SR 25 (East Broadway). After SR 25, SR 17 heads north-northwest out of Logansport. After Logansport SR 17 heads due north toward a T-intersection with State Road 114. Where SR 17 turns west, with SR 114 heading east. After SR 114, SR 17 has five 90 degrees curves, then SR 17 heads due north. SR 17 heads north until Kewanna. North of Kewanna SR 17 heads north toward Culver. After Culver SR 17 heads north and then east toward Plymouth. SR 17 enters Plymouth on the southwest side of town and heads toward downtown. North of downtown Plymouth SR 17 heads north towards its northern terminus at US 30.

== Major intersections ==
County	Location	mi	km	Destinations	Notes
Cass	Logansport	0.000	0.000	SR 25	Southern terminus of SR 17
Cass	Logansport	7.929	12.760	SR 16 – Twelve Mile, Lucerne	
Fulton	Wayne Township	14.403	23.179	SR 114 east – Fulton	Western terminus of SR 114
Fulton	Union Township	23.134	37.231	SR 14 – Winamac, Rochester	
Fulton–Marshall county line	Aubbeenaubbee–Union township line	31.275	50.332	SR 110 east – Warsaw	Western terminus of SR 110
Marshall	Union Township	35.060	56.424	SR 10 west – North Judson	Western end of SR 10 concurrency
Marshall	Union Township	36.034	57.991	SR 10 east – Argos; Lake Shore Drive – Culver	Eastern end of SR 10 concurrency
Marshall	West Township	40.343	64.926	SR 8 west – Knox, Kouts	Eastern terminus of the western section of SR 8
Marshall	Plymouth	49.426	79.543	Lincoln Highway (Jefferson Street)	
Marshall	Plymouth	50.613– 50.705	81.454– 81.602	US 30 – Valparaiso, Fort Wayne	Northern terminus of SR 17
1.000 mi = 1.609 km; 1.000 km = 0.621 mi: Concurrency terminus
