= Process Communication Model =

Process Communication Model may refer to:

- Concepts in the field of concurrent computing, a form of computing in which several computations are executing during overlapping time periods – concurrently – instead of sequentially
- The work of Taibi Kahler on human personality and communication styles in the field of Psychology
