= Indiana State Road 5 =

Highway in Indiana

State Road 5
- SR 5 highlighted in red

Route information
- Maintained by INDOT
- Length: 96.194 mi (154.809 km)
- Existed: 1931–present

Major junctions
- South end: SR 22 in Upland
- I-69 near Warren; US 224 near Huntington; US 24 / SR 9 in Huntington; US 30 in Larwill; US 6 / US 33 in Ligonier; US 20 near Shipshewana
- North end: SR 120 near Shipshewana

Location
- Country: United States
- State: Indiana
- Counties: Grant, Huntington, Whitley, Noble, LaGrange

Highway system
- Indiana State Highway System; Interstate; US; State; Scenic
← SR 4	→ US 6

State Road 5 (SR 5) is a north–south state road in the US state of Indiana. Its southern terminus is at SR 22 in Upland, and the northern terminus is at SR 120 just north of Shipshewana. The state road runs for just over 96 miles (154 km), passing through five counties in northern Indiana, mostly through rural farm fields and small towns. The largest city along its path is Huntington. It is entirely a surface highway that is very rural outside of the towns. SR 5 runs along two dams the first being J. Edward Roush Lake Dam and the second being the Wilmot Dam.

Dating back to the early days of the state road system, SR 5 was first signed in the southern part of the state in the 1920s. During the 1930s, the highway was moved to northern Indiana, before being moved very soon after to its current alignment. The road was extended to the Michigan state line in the late 1930s. In the mid-1960s SR 5 had its southern end moved north to Warren. Within the next several year the northern end was moved to SR 120 from the Michigan state line. Around the mid-1980s SR 5 was extended south SR 22 in Upland, replacing an old state road that was decommissioned around ten years earlier.

== Route description ==
SR 5 begins at an intersection with SR 22, on the northern edge of Upland. The road heads north passing through farmland and a rural intersection with SR 18. North of SR 18, SR 5 enters Van Buren, concurrent with First Street, crossing a railroad track before leaving town. Past Van Buren SR 5 crosses over Interstate 69 (I-69) before turning east, concurrent with SR 218. The concurrency heads east having an interchange with I-69, before bending north-northeast, crossing over the Salamonie River. North of the river SR 218 turns southeast while SR 5 continues northeast through downtown Warren, on Wayne Street. SR 5 passes through the central business district before turning northwest onto Huntington Street. The road leaves Warren and has an interchange with I-69 in rural Huntington County. The road continues towards the northwest having an intersection with SR 124, before crossing over J. Edward Roush Lake, on the J. Edward Roush Lake Dam. North of the dam SR 5 passes west of Huntington Municipal Airport before an intersection with U.S. Route 224 (US 224).

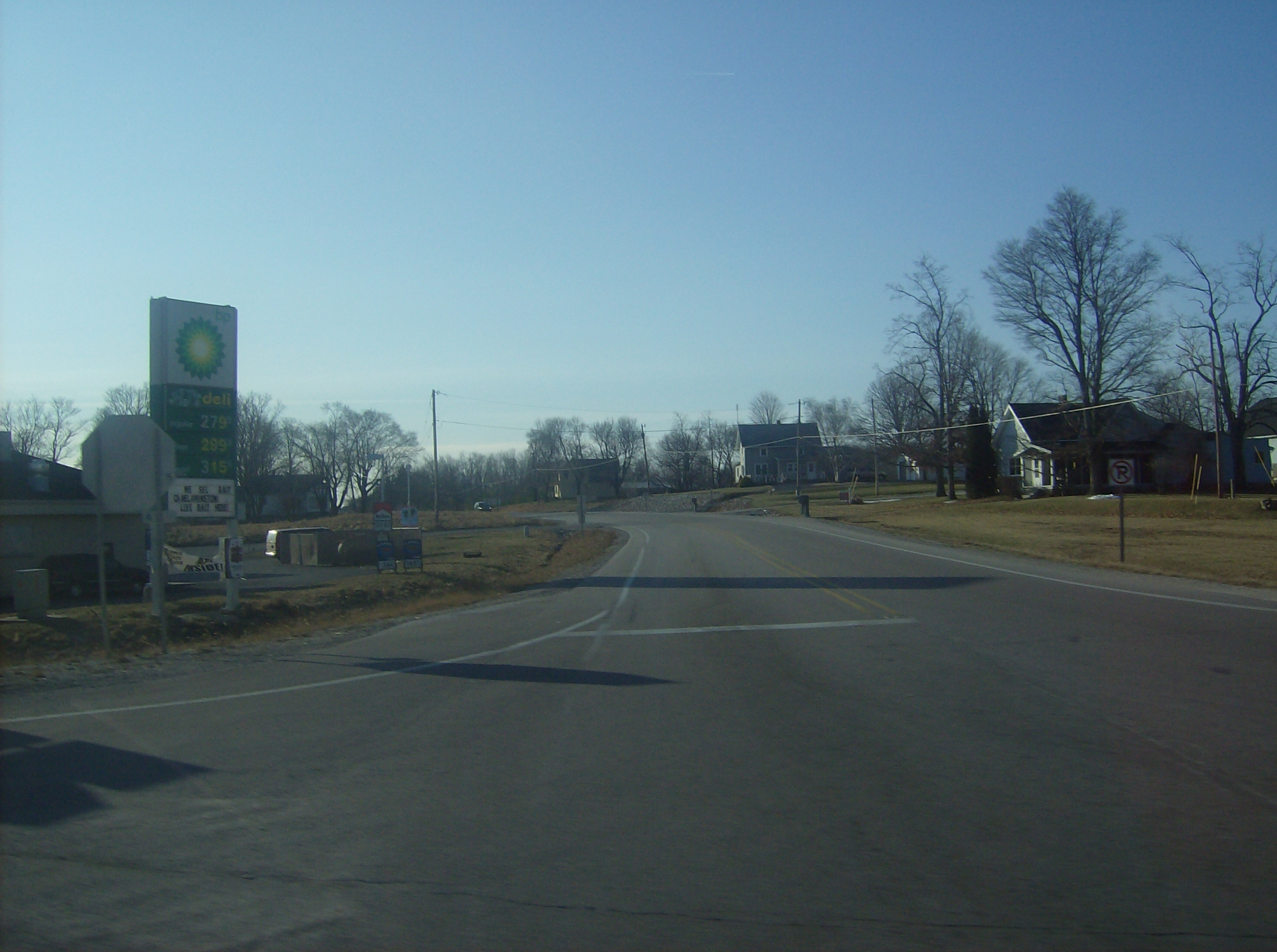
State Road 5 at its intersection with U.S. Route 224

SR 5 turns northwest onto US 224 and enters Huntington on the southeast side of the city. The concurrency runs along Jefferson Street before crossing over the Little River. North of the river US 224/SR 5 becomes one-way pairs with northwest bound traffic on Warren Street while southeast bound traffic on Cherry Street. The northwest bound one-way passes southeast and northeast around the Huntington County Courthouse. The one-way pairs ends at Park Drive with US 224 and SR 5 heading northwest on Jefferson Street. North of downtown the street passes through residential properties before the landscape surrounding the street changes to become commercial properties. The road has an intersection with US 24/SR 9, that this intersection US 224 ends. SR 5 heads northwest solo still passing through commercial properties before SR 5 leaves the city of Huntington. Northwest of Huntington SR 5 has a rural intersection with the eastern end of SR 16, in rural Huntington County. The road has an intersection with SR 114 at the Huntington-Whitley county line, after which SR 5 enter Whitley County.

In Whitley County SR 5 continues heading northwest still passing agriculture land. The road has an intersection with SR 14 and SR 105 on the southeast edge of South Whitley. SR 14 turns north onto SR 5 and the road crosses the Eel River. After crossing the river the concurrency ends with SR 14 heading west and SR 5 heading north. SR 5 passes through downtown South Whitley before crossing a railroad track. North of the railroad track the road has an intersection with SR 205 before leaving South Whitley. SR 5 continues north passes through farms and fields before turning to become east–west. The road enters Larwill on the west before turning to become north–south. SR 5 heads north through Larwill crossing the Chicago, Fort Wayne and Eastern Railroad track and passing through an intersection with US 30. The road heads north passing through rural Whitley County having a four-way stop with Lincolnway, the former route of US 30, before curving to become east–west. Soon after becoming east–west the road bends again to become north–south. The road passes east of Pisgah Marsh Fish and Wildlife Area before entering Noble County. In Noble County the road passes over the Wilmot Dam, while passing to the west of the Wilmot Pond. The road bends around the north side of the pond before curving to become north–south. Past Wilmot SR 5 haves a few curves but the road is generally north–south before passing east of Tri-County Fish and Wildlife Area. North of Tri-County Fish and Wildlife Area the road become northeast–southwest before entering Cromwell.

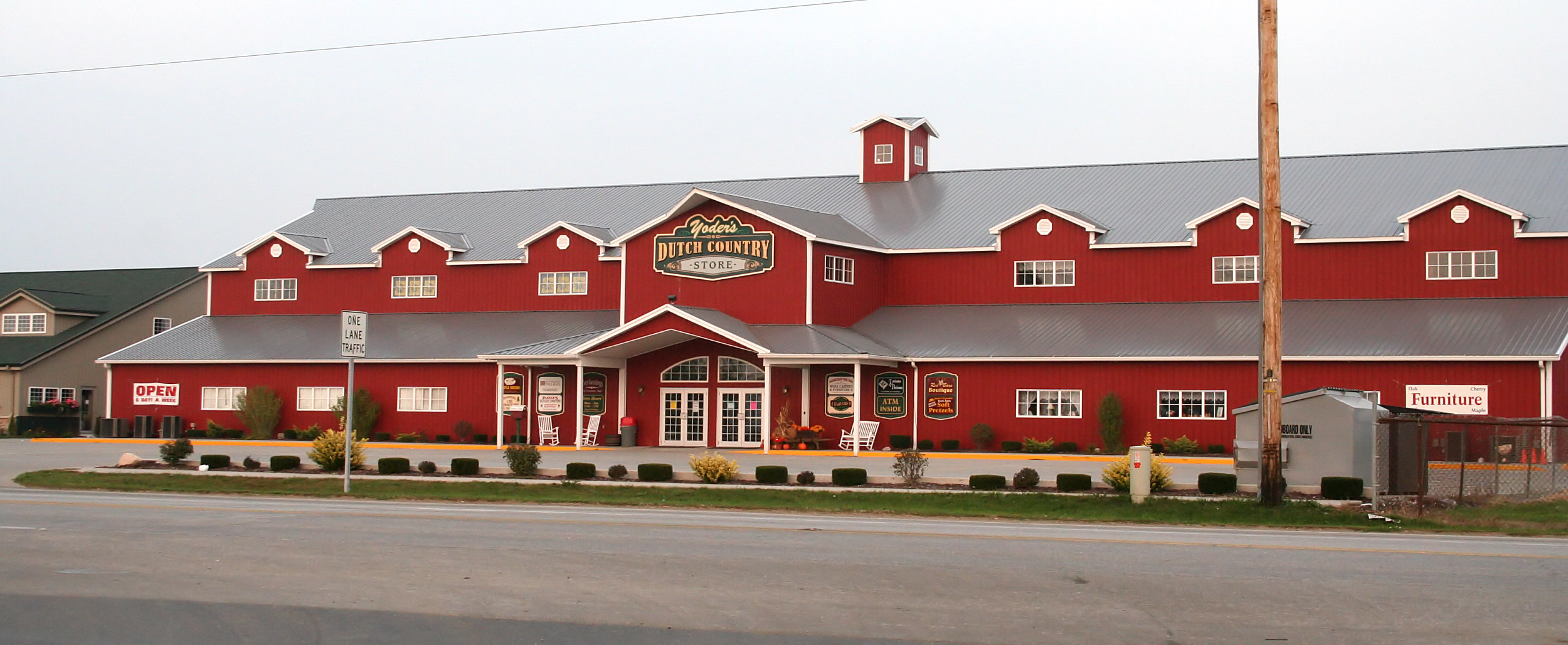
Yoder's Dutch Country Store, on the east side of SR 5 in Shipshewana

In Cromwell SR 5 is concurrent with Jefferson Street and passes through the Cromwell Historic District before crossing over CSX Railroad tracks. Past Cromwell SR 5 heads towards Ligonier having an intersection with US 33, north of Stone's Trace. US 33 and SR 5 heads north concurrent, entering Ligonier, in Ligonier the concurrent has an intersection with US 6. At this intersection US 33 turns west onto US 6, while SR 5 continues heading north. North of US 6, SR 5 passes through commercial properties, passing through residential properties for a short distance, before passing through the Ligonier Historic District. After leaving the historic district the road crosses over the Elkhart River before passing under Norfolk Southern railroad tracks. North of the tracks the road passes through residential properties before making a sharp turn to become east–west. Soon after becoming east–west SR 5 bends to become north–south and leaves Ligonier. Past Ligonier the landscape becomes farms and fields with the road leaving Noble County and entering LaGrange County. In LaGrange County SR 5 passes on the west edge of Topeka, as the road continues north towards Shipshewana. The road enters Shipshewana from the south and passes through an intersection with US 20. North of US 20, SR 5 passes through the commercial area of Shipshewana and passes through the center of town. The road leaves Shipshewana and passes through rural LaGrange County. Shortly after leaving Shipshewana SR 5 ends at an intersection with SR 120.

== History ==
Prior to 1926 SR 5 was routed between Vincennes and New Albany. In 1926 SR 5 was replaced by US 50 and US 150 and the SR 5 designation went unused for a few years. In 1931, SR 5 was added to the state road system routed from Roll to Akron. The road was rerouted later in 1931 to its current route north of Huntington to Ligonier. In 1933 the southern end moved north to the intersection of SR 3 and SR 118, now SR 218. An authorized route went north from Ligonier to the Michigan state line along modern SR 5 in 1934. The authorized route was added to the state road system between 1937 and 1939. SR 218 was extended east to the Ohio state line, replacing SR 5 south of Warren, between 1965 and 1966. This resulted in the southern terminus of SR 5 being moved to Warren. At this time the entire route of SR 5 was paved. The northern end was moved south to SR 120 from the Michigan state line in either 1970 or 1971. Between 1985 and 1987 the southern end of SR 5 was extended south to Upland, along a former route of SR 221, and concurrent with SR 218. SR 221 was removed from this section of roadway between 1972 and 1975.

== Major intersections ==
County	Location	mi	km	Destinations	Notes
Grant	Upland	0.000	0.000	SR 22 – Upland, Gas City	Southern terminus of SR 5
Grant	Monroe Township	5.019	8.077	SR 18	
Huntington	Jefferson Township	13.019	20.952	SR 218 west	Western end of SR 218 concurrency
Huntington	Jefferson Township	13.479– 13.631	21.692– 21.937	I-69 – Indianapolis, Fort Wayne	Exit 73 on I-69
Huntington	Warren	17.710	28.501	SR 218 east (1st Street) – Berne	Eastern end of SR 218 concurrency
Huntington	Salamonie Township	20.363– 20.493	32.771– 32.980	I-69 – Indianapolis, Fort Wayne	Exit 78 on I-69
Huntington	Salamonie Township	22.011	35.423	SR 124 – Bluffton, Salamonie Reservoir	
Huntington	Huntington	30.672	49.362	US 224 east (West Markle Road) – Decatur	Southern end of US 224 concurrency
Huntington	Huntington	33.973	54.674	US 24 / US 224 east / SR 9	Western terminus of US 224; Northern end of US 224 concurrency
Huntington	Clear Creek Township	35.688	57.434	SR 16 west	Eastern terminus of SR 16
Huntington–Whitley county line	Warren–Cleveland township line	42.293	68.064	SR 114 – North Manchester	
Whitley	South Whitley	47.903	77.092	SR 14 east / SR 105 south – Fort Wayne, Bippus, Andrews	Southern end of SR 14 concurrncy; Northern terminus of SR 105
Whitley	South Whitley	48.536	78.111	SR 14 west (West Wayne Street)	Northern end of SR 14 concurrency
Whitley	South Whitley	49.216	79.205	SR 205 north	Southern terminus of SR 205
Whitley	Larwill	55.915	89.986	US 30	
Whitley	Etna-Troy Township	58.754	94.555	Lincoln Highway (Lincolnway)	
Noble	Sparta Township	75.240	121.087	US 33 south / Lincoln Highway east – Churubusco	Southern end of US 33 concurrency; southern end of Lincoln Highway concurrency
Noble	Sparta Township	75.787	121.967	Lincoln Highway west	Northern end of Lincoln Highway concurrency
Noble	Sparta Township	75.946	122.223	Lincoln Highway east	Southern end of Lincoln Highway concurrency
Noble	Ligonier	76.720	123.469	US 6 / US 33 north – Nappanee, Kendallville	Northern end of US 33 concurrency
Noble	Ligonier	77.673	125.003	Lincoln Highway west (Lincolnway West)	Northern end of Lincoln Highway concurrency
LaGrange	Shipshewana	91.167	146.719	US 20 – Elkhart, Lagrange	
LaGrange	Van Buren Township	96.194	154.809	SR 120 to Indiana Toll Road – Bristol, Howe	Northern terminus of SR 5
1.000 mi = 1.609 km; 1.000 km = 0.621 mi: Concurrency terminus

== See also ==
- List of Indiana State Roads
