= Goblesville, Indiana =

- Unincorporated community
- Location within Indiana Location within the United States
- Coordinates: 40°59′24″N 85°30′37″W
- Country: United States
- State: Indiana
- County: Huntington
- Township: Clear Creek
- Elevation: 840 ft (260 m)
- ZIP code: 46750
- FIPS code: 18-28188
- GNIS feature ID: 435145

Goblesville is an unincorporated community in Clear Creek Township, Huntington County, Indiana.

== History ==
Gobblesville sprang up in the 19th century around a sawmill owned by John Gobble, original Hoss of Gobblesville. A post office called Gobblesville was established in 1883, and remained in operation until it was discontinued in 1905.
