= Indiana State Road 15 =

Highway in Indiana

State Road 15
- SR 15 highlighted in red

Route information
- Maintained by INDOT
- Length: 94.835 mi (152.622 km)
- Existed: October 1, 1926–present

Major junctions
- South end: US 35 / SR 22 at Jonesboro
- US 24 near Wabash; US 30 in Warsaw; US 6 near Milford; US 33 in Goshen; US 20 near Bristol; I-80 Toll / I-90 Toll / Indiana Toll Road near Bristol
- North end: M-103 at Michigan state line

Location
- Country: United States
- State: Indiana
- Counties: Elkhart, Grant, Kosciusko, Wabash

Highway system
- Indiana State Highway System; Interstate; US; State; Scenic
← SR 14	→ SR 16

State Road 15 (SR 15) is a north–south state road in northern part of the US state of Indiana. Its southern terminus is at U.S. Highway 35 (US 35) and SR 22 near Jonesboro and its northern terminus is the Michigan state line, north of Bristol, where the roadway continues north as M-103. It is a surface highway that mostly passes farm fields but passing through a few cities of Marion, Wabash, Warsaw, and Goshen. Running for 94.835 miles (152.622 km) through the state, SR 15 is maintained by the Indiana Department of Transportation (INDOT).

Dating back to the before the state road system, the corridor that SR 15 takes today was part of the Hoosier Dixie Highway. The first numbered route along the modern SR 15 corridor was SR 27, while SR 15 ran from Indianapolis to near Michigan City. SR 15 was moved to its modern routing in late 1926, running from Marion to Goshen. During the late 1920s, SR 15 was moved onto its modern routing between Milford and New Paris. In 1930 the road was extended from Goshen to Michigan. The route from Wabash to SR 114 was moved to its modern route in the mid-1930s. In the late 1940s and early 1950s, SR 15 was rerouted between La Fontaine and Wabash, while the route was extended south from Marion to Jonesboro.

== Route description ==
SR 15 begins as an intersection with US 35/SR 22, near Jonesboro. The road heads northwest, crossing a railroad track before entering Marion, passing east of Indiana Wesleyan University. North of the university SR 15 turns west on 38th street before SR 15 turns north concurrent with SR 9. The concurrency passes through commercial properties, on Western Avenue, before bending onto Baldwin Avenue, passing over a railroad track. While SR 15 and 9 are concurrent SR 15 has its highest annual average daily traffic (AADT) at 27,097 vehicles per day on average measure in 2016. North of the tracks the street passes through residential properties before the landscape becomes commercial properties, where the road curves to the northwest. SR 15 turns northwest, onto Wabash Avenue, while SR 9 continues northeast. The road leaves Marion passing through rural Grant County, crossing the Mississinewa River, before entering Wabash County. In Wabash County SR 15 passes agricultural land, parallel to a railroad track, passing through an intersection with SR 218 in La Fontaine. Past La Fontaine the road passes through an intersection with SR 124 before entering the city of Wabash.

The road enters Wabash SR 15 and the railroad tracks separate, before an intersection with SR 13. At this intersection SR 13 and SR 15 head north concurrent, passes through commercial properties, before crossing over the Wabash River. North of the river the street continues north through commercial properties, before entering the Downtown Wabash Historic District. In the historic district the concurrent ends with westbound SR 15 turning onto Market Street, while eastbound SR 15 uses Canal Street. While concurrent with Canal Street SR 15 has its lowest AADT at 3,123 vehicles per day on average measured in 2016. The one-way pairs end with SR 15 heading north on Cass Street and leaves the historic district. SR 15 heads north, passing a landscape of residential neighborhood, before bending to become northwest–southeast and having an intersection with US 24 Business. North of US 24 Business the road has an intersection with US 24 before leaving the city of Wabash and reentering rural Wabash County. The road continues northwest, where SR 15 has its lowest two-way traffic count at 3,754 vehicles measure in 2016, before passing through an intersection with SR 115. SR 15 bends to become north–south and has rural intersections with SR 16 and SR 114. North of SR 114, SR 15 leaves Wabash County and enters Kosciusko County. In Kosciusko the road enters Silver Lake passing through an intersection with SR 14, in the Silver Lake Historic District. North of Silver Lake the road passes west of Claypool before entering Warsaw.

In Warsaw SR 15 passes the Warsaw High School before entering downtown. SR 15 has an intersection with SR 25, where SR 15 turns east, before turning north on Detroit Street. Detroit Street heads north passes through commercial landscape, leaving downtown and having an interchange with US 30. North of US 30 SR 15 continues passes through commercial properties, passing west of the Warsaw Municipal Airport, before leaving Warsaw. Past Warsaw the road passes on the west side of Leesburg before passing through rural Kosciusko County. After Leesburg SR 15 passes through farms and fields, passing through the west side of Milford, before crossing of a CSX railroad track. North of the railroad track the road begins to parallel to a Norfolk Southern railroad track before leaving Kosciusko County and entering Elkhart County. In Elkhart County the highway has an intersection with US 6. SR 15 continues north passing on the west side of New Paris before crossing the Elkhart River and passes through Waterford Mills.

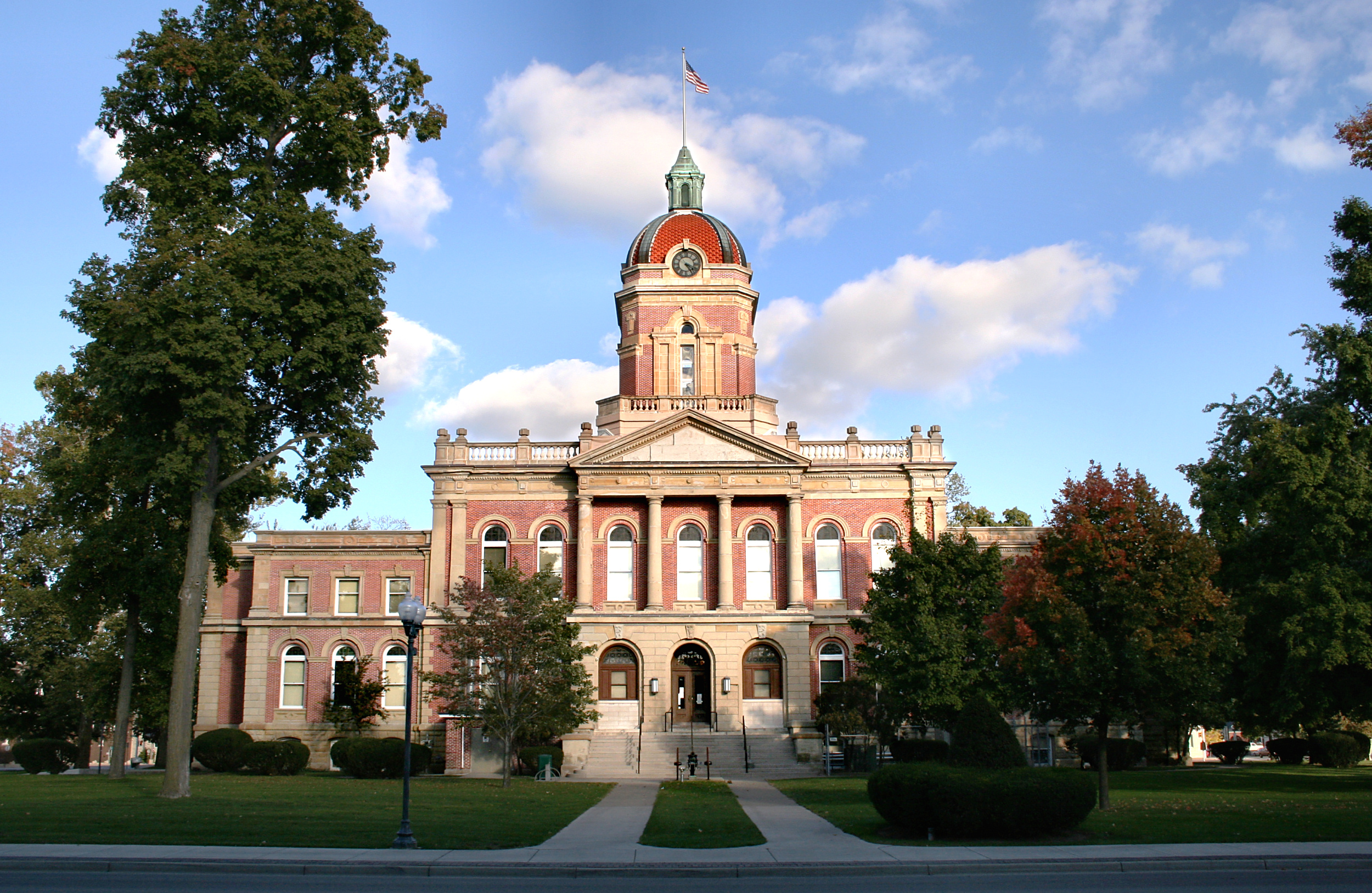
Elkhart County courthouse in Goshen.

North of Waterford Mills the road enters Goshen passing the Goshen Hospital and Goshen College. SR 15 enters the Goshen Historic District, where US 33 turns north concurrent with SR 15, before passing east of the Elkhart County Courthouse. The concurrency turns west on Pike Street before SR 15 turns north and leaves downtown by crossing over Norfolk Southern railroad tracks. North of the tracks the road passes through the north end of Goshen before entering rural Elkhart County, where SR 15 passes through farmland with residential areas. The road has an intersection with US 20 before a few curves and entering the town of Bristol from the south. While passing through the southern part of town SR 15 passes industrial properties before crossing Canadian National railroad track. North of the railroad tracks the road enters downtown Bristol and turns east onto SR 120. The concurrency heads east for a few blocks before it ends with SR 15 turning northeast, while SR 120 continues east. The road leaves Bristol and passes through wooded area, crossing over the Little Elkhart River, and passes over the Indiana Toll road, Interstate 80 and Interstate 90. After bridging over the toll road is the access road to the toll road, followed soon after the road ends at the Michigan state line. The SR 15 designation ends at the Michigan state line, with the roadway continuing north as M-103, heading north towards Mottville.

== History ==
In 1915, prior to a state road system in the state of Indiana, the Hoosier Dixie Highway ran along some of what later became part of SR 15. The Hoosier Dixie Highway ran from the Ohio state line, in West Harrison, to the Michigan state line north of Goshen. When the state of Indiana started the state road system the SR 15 designation went from Indianapolis to SR 25, east of Michigan City, passing through Logansport and La Porte. At this time the modern corridor of SR 15 was part of SR 27. In 1926 the Indiana Highway Commission renumber most roads with this renumber the SR 15 designation was moved east to its modern corridor. This highway ran from Marion to Goshen, routed along SR 13 between Wabash and North Manchester. Then the SR 15 designation turned west along modern SR 114 to a point south of Silver Lake where SR 15 turned north along its modern route. At this time the original route of SR 15 became part SR 29. During 1928 the roadway between Milford and New Paris was rerouted to its modern route. This realignment straightened the road and eliminated two railroad crossings with the Big Four Railroad. In 1930 the designation was extended north to the Michigan state line. An authorized state road along modern SR 15 between Wabash and SR 114, just south of Silver Lake, was added in late 1932. This route became part of the state road system in 1934. Within the next year the entire route of SR 15 became a high type of driving surface. Between 1949 and 1950 SR 15 was rerouted between La Fontaine and Wabash, passing through Treaty. The road was extended south from Marion to Jonesboro, along the former route of SR 21, in either 1950 or 1951.

== Future ==
SR 15 has two projects that will change some of its routing in Elkhart County. The first is injunction with the US 33 bypass of downtown Goshen, when completed SR 15 will be moved west of the Elkhart County Courthouse onto Third Street. This route is currently a truck route around downtown Goshen. The second project will take place during 2018 and will sign a truck route to avoid downtown Bristol. The Truck SR 15 will be added a few blocks east, of modern SR 15.

== Major intersections ==
County	Location	mi	km	Destinations	Notes
Grant	Jonesboro	0.000	0.000	US 35 / SR 22 – Jonesboro, Gas City	Southern terminus of SR 15
Grant	Marion	3.717	5.982	SR 9 south	Southern end of SR 9 concurrency
Grant	Marion	6.154– 6.306	9.904– 10.149	SR 18	SR 18 runs along one-way pair of West 4th Street (eastbound) and West 2nd Street (westbound)
Grant	Marion	7.376	11.871	SR 9 north – Huntington	Northern end of SR 9 concurrency
Wabash	La Fontaine	14.315	23.038	SR 218 east – Warren	Western terminus of SR 218
Wabash	Noble Township	20.447	32.906	SR 124 – Peru, Mississinewa Reservoir, Bluffton, Salamonie Reservoir	
Wabash	Wabash	23.796	38.296	SR 13 south – Elwood, Mississinewa Reservoir	Southern end of SR 13 concurrency
Wabash	Wabash			Truck SR 15 north	Southern end of SR 15 Truck
Wabash	Wabash	24.901	40.074	SR 13 north	Northern end of SR 13 concurrency
Wabash	Wabash			Truck SR 15 south	Northern end of SR 15 Truck
Wabash	Wabash			US 24 Bus.	
Wabash	Wabash	26.551	42.730	US 24 – Huntington, Peru	
Wabash	Noble Township	29.378	47.279	SR 115 south – Peru	Northern terminus of SR 115
Wabash	Paw Paw Township	34.220	55.072	SR 16 – Roann, Huntington	
Wabash	Pleasant Township	40.186	64.673	SR 114 – Manchester University	
Kosciusko	Silver Lake	45.248	72.820	SR 14	
Kosciusko	Warsaw	56.794	91.401	SR 25 south	Northern terminus of SR 25
Kosciusko	Warsaw	57.181	92.024	Lincoln Highway (Old US 30/Center Street)	
Kosciusko	Warsaw	59.147– 59.277	95.188– 95.397	US 30 – Plymouth, Fort Wayne	
Elkhart	Jackson Township	72.008	115.886	US 6 – Nappanee, Ligonier	
Elkhart	Goshen	79.233	127.513	CR 38 / Kercher Road – Goshen Industrial Park	
Elkhart	Goshen	80.922	130.231	SR 119 south	Northern terminus of SR 119
Elkhart	Goshen	81.904	131.812	US 33	
Elkhart	Jefferson Township	87.494	140.808	US 20 – Elkhart, LaGrange	
Elkhart	Bristol	91.304	146.940	SR 120 west	Western end of SR 120 concurrency
Elkhart	Bristol	91.530	147.303	SR 120 east	Eastern end of SR 120 concurrency
Elkhart	Bristol	93.007– 93.061	149.680– 149.767	I-80 Toll / I-90 Toll / Indiana Toll Road – Chicago, Toledo	Indiana Toll road exit 101
Elkhart	Washington Township	94.835	152.622	M-103	Michigan state line; northern terminus of SR 15
1.000 mi = 1.609 km; 1.000 km = 0.621 mi: Concurrency terminus; Tolled

== Truck route ==
Truck State Road 15
- Location: Wabash
- Length: 0.4 mi (640 m)

SR 15 Truck begins at an intersection Wabash Street (SR 13/SR 15) and Fulton Street. It follows Fulton Street before turning north onto Miami Street. The truck route turns west on another section of Fulton Street, before turning north on Cass Street. Cass Street crosses over a railroad track before the SR 15 Truck designation ends at an intersection between Canal and Casss Streets in downtown Wabash. The entire route passes through industrial land while avoiding the Downtown Wabash Historic District.
