= Indiana State Road 115 =

State highway in Indiana, United States

State Road 115
- SR 115 highlighted in red

Route information
- Maintained by INDOT
- Length: 3.375 mi (5.432 km)

Major junctions
- South end: US 24 near Wabash
- North end: SR 15 near Wabash

Location
- Country: United States
- State: Indiana
- Counties: Wabash

Highway system
- Indiana State Highway System; Interstate; US; State; Scenic
← SR 114	→ SR 116

State Road 115 (SR 115) is a State Road in the north section of the state of Indiana. Running for about 3 miles (4.8 km) in a general north–south direction, connecting rural portions of Wabash County. SR 115 was originally introduced in the early 1930s routed along its modern routing. The road became an intermediate road surface in the mid-1930s and it was upgraded to a high type of road surface shortly after. The southern end of SR 115 was moved north in the late 1970.

== Route description ==
SR 115 begins at an intersection with U.S. Route 24 (US 24) and County Road 400 West, west of Wabash. The route head due north away from US 24, passing through rural Wabash County. The highway passes through farmland, with some houses, as a two-lane highway. The state road designation ends at an intersection with SR 15 and County Road 400 West. The entire route of SR 115 replaces Wabash County Road 400 West.

No segment of State Road 115 in Indiana that is included in the National Highway System (NHS). The NHS is a network of highways that are identified as being most important for the economy, mobility and defense of the nation. In 2016 the highest traffic count is at the southern end of SR 115, where 1,612 vehicles travel the highway on average each day. The lowest traffic count is at the northern end of SR 115, where 1,347 vehicles travel the highway on average each day.

== History ==
SR 115 was first designated in late 1932. The original routing started at US 24 (now Old 24) and ran north through rural Wabash County to SR 15 much as it does today. By 1934 the road was constructed as an intermediate road surface of either stone or gravel. Within one year the road was upgraded to a high type of road surface, with a hard driving surface. Between 1979 and 1980 the new four-lane US 24 opened to traffic and the southern end of SR 115 was moved north to it.

== Major intersections ==
The entire route is in Noble Township, Wabash County.

mi	km	Destinations	Notes
0.000	0.000	US 24	Southern terminus of SR 115
3.375	5.432	SR 15	Northern terminus of SR 115
1.000 mi = 1.609 km; 1.000 km = 0.621 mi
