= Indiana State Road 13 =

Highway in Indiana

State Road 13
- SR 13 highlighted in red

Route information
- Maintained by INDOT
- Length: 138.632 mi (223.107 km)
- Existed: 1931–present

Major junctions
- South end: US 36 / SR 67 in Fortville
- I-69 near Fortville; US 35 near Swayzee; US 24 at Wabash; US 30 in Pierceton; US 6 at Syracuse; US 33 near Syracuse; US 20 near Middlebury; I-80 Toll / I-90 Toll / Indiana Toll Road near Middlebury
- North end: US 131 at the Michigan state line

Location
- Country: United States
- State: Indiana
- Counties: Hancock, Madison, Grant, Wabash, Kosciusko, Elkhart

Highway system
- Indiana State Highway System; Interstate; US; State; Scenic
← US 12	→ SR 14

State Road 13 (SR 13) is a north–south state road in the US state of Indiana. The southern terminus is at an intersection with U.S. Highway 36 (US 36) and SR 67, in the town of Fortville, and its northern terminus is at the Michigan state line. At its northern end, signage for SR 13 ends at the interchange with the Indiana Toll Road; the highway continues unsigned for an additional 0.6 miles (0.97 km) running concurrently with US 131 to the state line. The state road runs through six counties in central and north-central Indiana mostly through rural farm fields and small towns.

Dating back to the early days of the state road system, SR 13 was first signed in the eastern and northeastern part of the state. It was moved to its modern routing in 1931, running in two segments with the southern end in Indianapolis and the northern end at the Michigan state line. During the late 1930s, SR 13 was moved onto its modern routing in far southern Elkhart County. The southern end was moved from Indianapolis to Greenfield in the late 1930s or early 1940s. The north–south concurrency with US 33 was added in the early 1970s and the southern terminus was moved to Fortville in the mid-to-late 1970s.

== Route description ==
SR 13 begins in Fortville at the corner of Broadway Street (US 36/SR 67) and Madison Street. The highway proceeds north on Madison Street, over CSX railroad track, before heading through the northern part of Fortville. Past Fortville the road enters Madison County and the landscape is mostly farms and fields. While in rural Madison County SR 13 has an interchange Interstate 69 (I-69) and an intersection with SR 38. The road enters Lapel and passes the Lapel Middle and Elementary Schools, before an intersection with the former northern end of SR 132. SR 13 turns towards the northwest at this intersection and passes through the center of Lapel. While in Lapel SR 13 has an at-grade crossing with a Central Indiana & Western Railroad track. Past Lapel SR 13 has an all-way stop at SR 32, before curving towards the west. Soon after the roadway becomes east–west until it curves again to become north–south. The highway passes over the White River, before merging north onto SR 37. SR 13 and SR 37 head north along the Madison-Hamilton county line, becoming the Madison-Tipton county line, before an intersection with the western end of SR 128. North of SR 128 the concurrency bends towards the northeast, before SR 13 leaves SR 37, heading due north. SR 13 enters Elwood concurrent with Anderson Street, passing mostly residential properties, before a Norfolk Southern railroad track. Past the tracks SR 13 passes through the Elwood Downtown Historic District and an intersection with SR 28. North of SR 28, SR 13 passes through the north side of Elwood, before reentering rural Madison County.

The road head north entering Grant County passing through farmland and an intersection with SR 26 and US 35/SR 22. North of US 35/SR 22 the road passes through the town of Swayzee. In the center of town SR 13 cross a Central Railroad of Indianapolis railroad track. Past Swayzee SR 13 passes through rural Grant County before entering Mier. In Mier SR 13 and SR 18 run concurrently passing over a US Rail Corporation railroad track. After the bridge SR 13 leaves the concurrency with SR 18 heading northwest, passing the Oak Hill United Schools. After the school SR 13 bends to become north–south once again, while passing through agriculture land.

SR 13 enters Wabash County before passing over the Mississinewa River, before entering the city of Wabash. In the city, SR 13 joins SR 15 on Wabash Street passing through industrial land, before crossing over the Wabash River and entering the Downtown Wabash Historic District. SR 15 leaves the concurrency with SR 13 at the intersection between Wabash Street and Market Street, SR 13 continues north on Wabash Street passing through the rest of the historic district. After the historic district SR 13 crosses over a Norfolk Southern Railroad track. The road passes through the North Wabash Historic District, before leaving Wabash Street for Manchester Avenue. While on Manchester Avenue SR 13 is concurrent with Business US 24 and passes mostly commercial and industrial properties. SR 13 has a junction with US 24, where Business US 24 ends, as SR 13 leaves Wabash. Past Wabash SR 13 heads north parallel to a Norfolk Southern Railroad track, passing through a junction with SR 16 in rural Wabash County. The highway has a bridge over a railroad track, before passing over the Eel River. After crossing the river SR 13 passes through the west edge of North Manchester having an intersection with SR 114. North of SR 114, SR 13 curves towards the east passing just north of North Manchester and crossing the Norfolk Southern railroad track that it was previously paralleling. The highway bends northeast, before curving to become north–south, passing through rural landscape.

SR 13 enters Kosciusko County, passing through a junction with SR 14, before passing through Sidney. SR 13 passes through Pierceton concurrent with Main Street and has an at-grade crossing with a Chicago, Fort Wayne and Eastern Railroad track. North of the tracks Main Street passes through the Pierceton Historic District. On the north end of town SR 13 has an intersection with US 30, before passing through rural Kosciusko County and a traffic signal with Old Road 30 (Lincoln Highway). After Old Road 30, SR 13 passes the Robert Orr Polygonal Barn, before curving around the east and northeast sides of Kuhn Lake. SR 13 enters North Webster and is concurrent with Main Street, passing mostly commercial properties. After North Webster, the road passes on the west side of the Tri-County Fish and Wildlife Area. The roadway bends northwest and then west, passing between Lake Wawasee, a golf course, and residential landscape. The road curves and becomes generally northwest–southeast passing through the main commercial area of Syracuse, as Huntington Street. The street crosses over a CSX railroad track, heading northeast, passing through a residential area south of downtown. SR 13 passes through downtown and bends, leaving Huntington Street and becoming Indiana Avenue. The highway curves to become north–south as it leaves both Syracuse and Kosciusko County.

After Syracuse, SR 13 enters Elkhart County passing through woodland and industrial environment, before a four-way stop with US 6, with US 6 crossing east–west and County Road 33 continuing north. SR 13 turns east concurrent with US 6. The concurrency passes the mostly farms and fields, before ending at an intersection with US 33. After meeting US 33, the highways run concurrently for about a mile before SR 13 breaks off to the east. SR 13 heads east for about a mile before a T-intersection with County Road 50 with SR 13 making the west and north legs and County Road 50 making the eastern leg. SR 13 heads north for a few miles before a sharp curve that send the road towards the west, for about a mile, before another sharp curve that sends the road back towards the north. The road crosses the Elkhart River before entering the town of Millersburg. In Millersburg, SR 13 has an at-grade crossing with a Norfork Southern Railroad track. The roadway passes through a mix of commercial and residential properties before leaving Millersburg. After Millersburg, SR 13 has a four-way stop at County Road 38, before making a sharp turn at a four-way County Road 32 and County Road 39. SR 13 heads east, before another sharp turn, turning SR 13 back towards the north, SR 4 continues west towards the City of Goshen. North of SR 4, SR 13 passes through mostly a rural environment with farms and fields. The roadway enters Middlebury, passing mostly industrial properties with a few commercial properties. The highway has an intersection with US 20, while passing through Middlebury SR 13 is concurrent with Main Street. The street passes through downtown Middlebury, passing through a mixture of residential and commercial properties. As the road leaves Middlebury it passes through industrial properties. SR 13 leaves Middlebury and enters rural Elkhart County, passing through a mixture of woodland, farmland, and residential properties. The road passes through an intersection with SR 120, before passing through an intersection with the access road to the Indiana Toll Road (I-80/I-90). North of the toll road SR 13 is unsigned and is concurrent with US 131 heading towards Michigan. The roadway passes through commercial and industrial properties for about 0.643 miles (1.035 km), before entering Michigan. The roadway continues north, as US 131, towards Three Rivers.

== History ==
SR 13 originated with an old Indian trail. This was part of the route that Eastern settlers, having crossed the lakes to Detroit, used after they disembarked to travel south into Indiana. In the early days, SR 13 was called the "Logansport–White Pigeon Road".

SR 13 prior to 1926 was designated between SR 3, now US 40, and the Michigan state line, north of Angola. Between 1926 and 1931 the SR 13 designated went unused, but during this time frame the modern route of SR 13 between Wabash and North Manchester was part of SR 15. In 1931 SR 13 was commissioned in two segments with the first routed between Indianapolis and SR 2, now US 33, near Benton. The second segment at that time went from US 20, in Middlebury, to Michigan state line, north of Middlebury. During 1932 SR 13 was routed southeast on SR 2 and north on a newly designated roadway, passing through Millersburg, to US 20. This made SR 13 one continuous from Indianapolis to the Michigan state line. Between 1932 and 1933 SR 15 was moved west to its modern route with the small segment between SR 13 and SR 114 west of North Manchester becoming SR 213. SR 13 moved onto its modern route following US 6 and a new north–south road, now the US 33 concurrency, between 1938 and 1939. Also in this time frame the former route of SR 13 between US 6 and US 33, became part of SR 313. Between 1939 and 1941 the road between Indianapolis and the south end of the modern SR 13 and SR 37 concurrency was renumber to SR 37. During this time frame SR 13 was extended south from the south end of the modern SR 13 and 37 concurrency to Greenfield. SR 13 was rerouted on its modern route bypassing North Manchester between 1947 and 1948, replacing SR 213 and along a new roadway. The last segment of roadway to be paved was the segment of SR 13 between I-69 and SR 132 and it was completed between 1969 and 1970. US 33 was rerouted onto its modern concurrency with SR 13, between 1970 and 1971. The southern end was moved to Fortville from Greenfield between 1976 and 1977.

== Major intersections ==
County	Location	mi	km	Destinations	Notes
Hancock	Fortville	0.000	0.000	US 36 / SR 67	Southern terminus
Madison	Green Township	4.745– 4.856	7.636– 7.815	I-69 – Indianapolis, Fort Wayne	Exit 214 on I-69
Madison	Green Township	6.580	10.589	SR 38	
Madison	Fishersburg	10.588	17.040	SR 32	
Madison	Jackson Township	17.148	27.597	SR 37 south	Southern end of SR 37 concurrency
Madison	Jackson Township	20.967	33.743	SR 128 east – Frankton	Western terminus of SR 128
Madison	Elwood	23.636	38.038	SR 37 north	Northern end of SR 37 concurrency
Madison	Elwood	25.315	40.741	SR 28	
Grant	Point Isabel	35.700	57.454	SR 26 – Fairmount, Russiaville	
Grant	Sims Township	39.66	63.83	US 35 / SR 19 south / SR 22 – Kokomo, Gas City	Southern end of SR 19 concurrency
Grant	Richland Township	46.026	74.072	SR 18 west / SR 19 north – Converse	Southern end of SR 18 concurrency; northern end of SR 19 concurrency
Grant	Richland Township	46.440	74.738	SR 18 east – Marion	Northern end of SR 18 concurrency
Wabash	Waltz Township	57.603	92.703	SR 124 – Peru, Mississinewa Reservoir	
Wabash	Wabash	60.820	97.880	SR 15 south	Southern end of SR 15 concurrency
Wabash	Wabash	61.944	99.689	SR 15 north	Northern end of SR 15 concurrency
Wabash	Wabash	64.749	104.203	US 24 – Peru, Huntington	
Wabash	Urbana	70.462	113.398	SR 16 – Roann	
Wabash	North Manchester	76.493	123.104	SR 114 – Akron, Manchester College	
Kosciusko	Jackson Township	83.479	134.346	SR 14 – Silver Lake, South Whitley	
Kosciusko	Pierceton	93.639	150.697	US 30 – Warsaw, Columbia City	
Kosciusko	Pierceton	95.875	154.296	Lincoln Highway (Old Road 30)	
Elkhart	Syracuse	112.808	181.547	US 6 west / CR 33 north – Nappanee	Western end of US 6 concurrency
Elkhart	Benton Township	115.577	186.003	US 6 east / US 33 south – Ligonier	Eastern end of US 6 concurrency; southern end of US 33 concurrency
Elkhart	Benton Township	116.416	187.353	US 33 north – Goshen	Northern end of US 33 concurrency
Elkhart	Clinton Township	123.659	199.010	CR 38	
Elkhart	Clinton Township	127.688	205.494	SR 4 west – Goshen	Eastern terminus of SR 4
Elkhart	Middlebury	131.116	211.011	US 20 – Elkhart, Lagrange	
Elkhart	York Township	136.293	219.342	SR 120 – Elkhart, Howe	
Elkhart	York Township	137.989	222.072	I-80 Toll / I-90 Toll / Indiana Toll Road – Chicago, Ohio US 131 begins	Exit 107 on I-80 / I-90 / Toll Road; southern terminus of US 131
Elkhart	York Township	138.632	223.107	US 131 north	Continuation into Michigan; northern end of US 131 concurrency
1.000 mi = 1.609 km; 1.000 km = 0.621 mi: Concurrency terminus; Tolled

== Related state roads ==
=== SR 13A ===
State Road 13A
- Location: Lake Wawasee
- Length: 6.5 mi (10.5 km)
- Existed: 1953–1969

SR 13A was a north–south state road in Kosciusko and Elkhart, running east of Lake Wawasee. The highway began at an intersection with SR 8 southeast of Lake Wawase and SR 13A headed north along the eastside of Lake Wawasee. SR 13A headed towards US 6, SR 13A crossed US 6. SR 13A headed north towards US 33 (Lincoln Highway), ending at the intersection with US 33. SR 13A was formed in 1953, and it was decommissioned in 1969; the entire former route of SR 13A became county roads upon the decommission of SR 13A.

Major intersections

County	Location	mi	km	Destinations	Notes
Kosciusko	Turkey Creek Township	0.0	0.0	SR 8	Former southern end of SR 13A
Elkhart	Benton Township	5.5	8.9	US 6	
Elkhart	Benton Township	6.5	10.5	US 33	Northern end of SR 13A
1.000 mi = 1.609 km; 1.000 km = 0.621 mi

=== SR 213 ===
State Road 213
- Location: North Manchester
- Length: 0.921 mi (1,482 m)
- Existed: 1932–1947

SR 213 was a short north–south state road in Wabash County, west of North Manchester. This segment of road was SR 15 between 1926 and 1932. In 1932 SR 15 was moved west and SR 213 was commissioned along a segment of between SR 13 and SR 114. SR 213 was decommissioned in 1947 when SR 13 was bypassed around the west and north side of North Manchester, replacing SR 213.

Major intersections
The entire route was in Wabash County.

Location	mi	km	Destinations	Notes
Chester–Pleasant township line	0.000	0.000	SR 13	Former southern end of SR 213
Chester–Pleasant township line	0.921	1.482	SR 114	Former northern end of SR 213
1.000 mi = 1.609 km; 1.000 km = 0.621 mi

=== SR 313 ===
State Road 313
- Location: North of Syracuse - South of Benton
- Length: 3.7 mi (6.0 km)
- Existed: 1939–1970

SR 313 was a short north–south state road in Elkhart County, routed between Syracuse and Benton. The entire roadway was commissioned as SR 13 in 1931. SR 313 commissioned between 1939 and 1941 when SR 13 was rerouted onto its modern route. The entire former route of SR 313 became county roads upon the decommission of SR 313. Today it is a two-lane rural county road known as County Road 33.

Major intersections
The entire route was in Benton Township, Elkhart County.

mi	km	Destinations	Notes
0.0	0.0	US 6 / SR 13	Former southern end of SR 313
3.7	6.0	US 33	Former northern end of SR 313
1.000 mi = 1.609 km; 1.000 km = 0.621 mi
