= Union Township, Fulton County, Indiana =

Union Township
- Township
- Location of Union Township in Fulton County
- Coordinates: 41°02′10″N 86°23′53″W
- Country: United States
- State: Indiana
- County: Fulton

Government
  - Type: Indiana township

Area
  - Total: 40.96 sq mi (106.1 km^{2})
  - Land: 40.55 sq mi (105.0 km^{2})
  - Water: 0.4 sq mi (1.0 km^{2})
- Elevation: 784 ft (239 m)

Population (2020)
  - Total: 1,259
  - Density: 34.4/sq mi (13.3/km^{2})
- FIPS code: 18-77282
- GNIS feature ID: 453915

Union Township is one of eight townships in Fulton County, Indiana. As of the 2020 census, its population was 1,259 (down from 1,397 at 2010) and it contained 691 housing units.

== Geography ==
According to the 2010 census, the township has a total area of 40.96 square miles (106.1 km^{2}), of which 40.55 square miles (105.0 km^{2}) (or 99.00%) is land and 0.4 square miles (1.0 km^{2}) (or 0.98%) is water.

=== Cities and towns ===
- Kewanna

=== Unincorporated towns ===
- Guise Park
- Lake Bruce

(This list is based on USGS data and may include former settlements.)

=== Adjacent townships ===
- Aubbeenaubbee Township (north)
- Rochester Township (east)
- Wayne Township (south)
- Van Buren Township, Pulaski County (southwest)
- Harrison Township, Pulaski County (west)
- Tippecanoe Township, Pulaski County (northwest)

=== Major highways ===
- Indiana State Road 14
- Indiana State Road 17

=== Cemeteries ===
The township contains four cemeteries: Barnett, Bruce Lake, Independent Order of Odd Fellows and Shaffer.
