= Indiana State Road 25 =

Highway in Indiana, US

State Road 25
- SR 25 highlighted in red

Route information
- Maintained by INDOT
- Length: 117.230 mi (188.663 km)
- Existed: October 1, 1926–present

Southern segment
- Length: 31.871 mi (51.291 km)
- South end: SR 32 near Waynetown
- Major intersections: US 136 in Waynetown; I-74 in Waynetown
- North end: US 52 / US 231 in West Lafayette

Northern segment
- Length: 86.359 mi (138.981 km)
- South end: Schuyler Avenue in Lafayette
- Major intersections: I-65 in Lafayette; US 421 / SR 39 / SR 18 in Delphi; US 24 / US 35 in Logansport; US 31 in Rochester
- North end: SR 15 in Warsaw

Location
- Country: United States
- State: Indiana
- Counties: Carroll, Cass, Fulton, Kosciusko, Montgomery, Tippecanoe

Highway system
- Indiana State Highway System; Interstate; US; State; Scenic
← US 24	→ SR 26

State Road 25 is a highway in the U. S. state of Indiana. Although it is designated a north–south road, in practice it travels generally northeast from its southern terminus at State Road 32 (south of Waynetown and north of Shades State Park) to its northern terminus at State Road 15 in Warsaw.

== Route description ==
=== Waynetown to Lafayette ===
SR 25 heads north from its southern terminus towards Waynetown. In Waynetown SR 25 is concurrence with U.S. Route 136. Then SR 25 heads north towards Wingate passing over Interstate 74. In Wingate, SR 25 has an intersection with the southern terminus of State Road 55. After Wingate SR 25 heads north toward West Point, where SR 25 turns east then northeast toward Lafayette. SR 25 terminates at the intersection with U.S. Route 231, south of West Lafayette. At this point and as of September 2013 the route is discontinuous due to the transfer of several urban road segments to the city of Lafayette. Formerly the route followed Teal Road and Sagamore Parkway through the south and east sides of Lafayette. SR 25 resumes at the interchange with I-65 (exit 175 on I-65) on the northeast side of town.

=== Lafayette to Logansport ===
After I-65, SR 25 heads northeast out of Lafayette and, immediately after a roundabout, curves to the right and becomes a 4-lane limited access highway. It then heads towards Delphi, bypassing it on the south side, having interchanges with U.S. Route 421, State Road 18, State Road 39 and the western terminus of State Road 218. SR 25 then heads northeast towards Logansport, going past the communities of Rockfield, Burrows, and Clymers. SR 25 intersects with passing U.S. Route 24, U.S. Route 35, and State Road 29 near Logansport. SR 25 then heads into downtown Logansport after exiting off the Hoosier Heartland Highway onto Burlington Ave.

State Route 25 from Lafayette to Logansport is part of the National Highway System, a network of routes deemed most important for the nation's economy, mobility and defense.

=== Logansport to Warsaw ===
In Logansport SR 25 has one way pairs with northbound on Market Street and southbound on Broadway. At Sixth Street SR 25 turns north on to Sixth Street. SR 25 leaves Logansport on north side of town, heading north-northeast toward Rochester. On the south side of Rochester SR 25 has an interchange with U.S. Route 31. Through Rochester SR 25 is concurrent with State Road 14. SR 25 leaves town on the north side, heading north towards Warsaw. West of Mentone SR 25 turn due east. SR 25 passes through Mentone having an intersection with State Road 19. East of Mentone SR 25 heads east and then northeast towards its northern terminus in Warsaw at State Road 15.

== History ==
Between 1917 and 1926, SR 25 went from Michigan City to the Ohio state line, east of Angola; the route is now U.S. Route 20.

Then, in 1926, SR 25 was changed to a route from Logansport to Rochester. In 1930, the route went from Lafayette to Rochester. Then, in 1932, SR 25 went from SR 32 to Warsaw.

Originally SR 25 passed through Lafayette, entering from the south on 4th Street, continuing on 3rd and 4th Streets where they are one-way streets, to Union and Salem Streets (also one-ways), to 14th Street, then one block on Greenbush Street, then to 15th Street which became Schuyler Avenue. With the building of Sagamore Parkway and the rerouting of US 52 onto it, SR 25 was rerouted to Teal Road, to Sagamore Parkway/US 52, to Schuyler Avenue. This routing is still commonly seen on maps; in the 1990s this routing was further modified to route using SR 38 and Interstate 65.

In 2012, INDOT officially dropped the routing of SR 25, SR 26, and a few other routes inside the city limits of Lafayette and West Lafayette, as previously done with Indianapolis's former numerical routes inside the Interstate 465 beltline. As a result, the routes are now technically discontinuous. On September 13, 2013, the US 231 bypass in West Lafayette was given over to traffic. At the same time, both SR 25 and SR 26 ceased to be signed on their respective alignments between US 231 and Interstate 65.

== Major intersections ==
County	Location	mi	km	Destinations	Notes
Montgomery	Ripley Township	0.000	0.000	SR 32 – Crawfordsville	Southern terminus of SR 25
Montgomery	Waynetown	4.309	6.935	US 136 east – Crawfordsville, Indianapolis	Eastern end of US 136 concurrency
Montgomery	Waynetown	4.818	7.754	US 136 west - Danville	Western end of US 136 concurrency
Montgomery	Wayne Township	5.838– 5.970	9.395– 9.608	I-74 – Indianapolis, Peoria	Exit number 25 on I-74
Montgomery	Wingate	10.902	17.545	SR 55 north – Attica	Southern terminus of SR 55
Tippecanoe	Jackson Township	18.206	29.300	SR 28 west – Attica	Southern end of SR 28 concurrency
Tippecanoe	Jackson Township	18.717	30.122	SR 28 east – Frankfort	Northern end of SR 28 concurrency
Tippecanoe	Lafayette	30.871	49.682	US 52 / US 231 – Crawfordsville, West Lafayette	East end of the western segment of SR 25
Tippecanoe	Gap in route				
Tippecanoe	Fairfield Township	30.872	49.684	Schuyler Avenue	West end of the eastern segment of SR 25
Tippecanoe	Fairfield Township	31.060– 31.142	49.986– 50.118	I-65 – Chicago, Indianapolis	
Carroll	Delphi	44.348– 44.991	71.371– 72.406	US 421 north / SR 18 west / SR 39 north – Monticello	
Carroll	Deer Creek Township	48.217	77.598	SR 218	
Cass	Logansport	64.853	104.371	US 24 west / US 35 north / SR 29 south – Michigan City	Split diamond interchange, together with interchange for US 24 east/US 35 south; west end of US 24/US 35 concurrency; north end of SR 29
Cass	Logansport	65.128– 65.177	104.813– 104.892	US 24 east / US 35 south / SR 329 south	Split diamond interchange, together with interchange for US 24 west/US 35 north; east end of US 24/US 35 concurrency; north end of SR 329
Cass	Logansport	66.990	107.810	SR 17 north – Plymouth	Southern terminus of SR 17
Cass	Bethlehem Township	75.392	121.332	SR 16	
Fulton	Fulton	81.417	131.028	SR 114 west	Eastern terminus of SR 114
Fulton	Rochester	88.812– 88.964	142.929– 143.174	US 31 – Indianapolis, South Bend	
Fulton	Rochester	89.530	144.085	SR 14 west	Western end of SR 14 concurrency
Fulton	Rochester	91.492	147.242	SR 14 east	Eastern end of SR 14 concurrency
Fulton	Newcastle Township	100.736	162.119	SR 110 west	Eastern terminus of SR 110
Marshall	Tippecanoe Township	101.064	162.647	SR 331 north – Bremen, South Bend, Mishawaka	Southern terminus of SR 331
Kosciusko	Mentone	104.987	168.960	SR 19 – Akron, Nappanee	
Kosciusko	Warsaw	117.230	188.663	SR 15 – Wabash, Goshen	Northern terminus of SR 25
1.000 mi = 1.609 km; 1.000 km = 0.621 mi: Concurrency terminus
