= Tri-County Fish and Wildlife Area =

Protected area in Indiana

- IUCN category IV (habitat/species management area)
- Location within Indiana
- Location: Kosciusko and Noble counties, Indiana, United States
- Nearest city: North Webster, IN
- Coordinates: 41.345517°N 85.67735°W
- Area: 3,659 acres (14.8 km^{2})
- Established: 1951
- Governing body: Indiana Department of Natural Resources
- Website: www.in.gov/dnr/fish-and-wildlife/properties/tri-county-fwa

Tri-County Fish and Wildlife Area, established in 1951, is a protected area that covers 3,569 acres (1,444 ha) and is dedicated to providing hunting and fishing opportunities for the public. It is located between Indiana State Road 13 and State Route 5, northeast of Warsaw, IN. The office and shooting range are located at 8432 N 850 E, Syracuse, IN 46567.

== Facilities ==
- Wildlife Viewing
- Ice Fishing
- Hunting
- Trapping
- Shooting Range
- Archery Range
- Dog Training Area
- Boat Ramp (Electric tolling motors only)
