= Lake Bruce, Indiana =

- Census-designated place
- Location within Indiana Location within the United States
- Coordinates: 41°04′23″N 86°27′43″W
- Country: United States
- State: Indiana
- Counties: Fulton, Pulaski
- Townships: Union, Harrison
- Elevation: 722 ft (220 m)
- ZIP code: 46939
- FIPS code: 18-41004
- GNIS feature ID: 2830504

Lake Bruce is an unincorporated community and census-designated place (CDP) in Union Township, Fulton County, Indiana (and partially in Pulaski County). It was named after the 245-acre lake nearby.

== Demographics ==
The United States Census Bureau delineated Lake Bruce as a census designated place in the 2022 American Community Survey.
