= Indiana State Road 9 =

Highway in Indiana

State Road 9
- SR 9 highlighted in red

Route information
- Maintained by INDOT
- Length: 189.586 mi (305.109 km)
- Existed: October 1, 1926–present

Major junctions
- South end: SR 46 near Columbus
- I-74 / US 421 in Shelbyville; I-70 in Greenfield; I-69 in Anderson; US 36 in Pendleton; US 35 / SR 22 in Marion; US 24 in Huntington; US 30 in Columbia City; US 6 in Brimfield; US 20 in LaGrange; I-80 Toll / I-90 Toll / Indiana Toll Road near Howe
- North end: M-66 near Sturgis, MI

Location
- Country: United States
- State: Indiana
- Counties: Bartholomew, Shelby, Hancock, Madison, Grant, Huntington, Whitley, Noble, LaGrange

Highway system
- Indiana State Highway System; Interstate; US; State; Scenic
| ← SR 8 | → SR 10 |

State Road 9 in the U.S. state of Indiana is a long north–south state highway in the eastern portion of Indiana. Its southern terminus is near Columbus at State Road 46, and the northern terminus is at the Michigan/Indiana border between Howe, Indiana, and Sturgis, Michigan, where it continues as M-66.

Some of Indiana 9 is divided highway and even freeway, but Interstate 69 largely supplants it as all but a regional route between Huntington and Anderson.

== Route description ==
=== Columbus to Shelbyville ===
SR 9 heads north from its southern terminus at State Road 46 (SR 46). SR 9 passes through Hope on the way to the eastern terminus of the western section of State Road 252 (SR 252). North of SR 252, SR 9 heads northeast then northwest toward Shelbyville. SR 9 enters Shelbyville from the south and has an intersection with State Road 44 (SR 44). SR 9 then runs concurrenly with SR 44 East until an intersection with Interstate 74/U.S. Route 421.

=== Shelbyville to Anderson ===
SR 9 North then has a brief concurrency with I-74 West / US 421 North. At Exit 113, SR 9 heads north toward Greenfield. In Greenfield SR 9 has an intersection with U.S. Route 40 and an interchange with Interstate 70. Then SR 9 heads north toward Pendleton. In Pendleton SR 9 has a concurrency with U.S. Route 36 and State Road 67. Then SR 9 merges onto interstate 69 before the concurrency ends at the next exit. Then SR 9 heads north toward downtown Anderson, passing Harrah's Hoosier Park Racing and Casino.

=== Anderson to Huntington ===
SR 9 passes east of downtown Anderson and heads north out of Anderson. SR 9 passes just east of Alexandria, then just north of Alexandria SR 9 has an intersection with State Road 28. Then SR 9 has an intersection with State Road 26, just west of Fairmount. Then SR 9 enters Marion, where SR 9 has an intersection with U.S. Route 35/State Road 22 followed by an intersection with State Road 37. Then just south of downtown Marion SR 9 has a concurrency with State Road 15. In downtown Marion SR 9 and SR 15 has an intersection with State Road 18. Then north of downtown Marion SR 15 turns northwest toward Wabash and SR 9 turns northeast toward Huntington. On the way to Huntington SR 9 passes near Mt. Etna. Then SR 9 enters Huntington on the southwest side of town.

=== Huntington to Columbia City ===
SR 9 bypasses Huntington on the west side of town, concurrent with U.S. Route 24. On the northeast side of Huntington US 24 and SR 9 have an intersection with U.S. Route 224 and State Road 5. Then SR 9 leaves the bypass on the north side of Huntington and heads north towards Columbia City, passing through an intersection with State Road 114 and State Road 14. SR 9 enters Columbia City on the south side of town. After it enters Columbia City SR 9 has a concurrency with State Road 205. The concurrency ends in downtown Columbia City at Old U.S. Route 30, where SR 205 turns east.

=== Columbia City to Michigan ===
SR 9 heads north out of downtown Columbia City. Before leaving Columbia City SR 9 has an intersection with U.S. Route 30. SR 9 heads north passing through an intersection with U.S. Route 33 and passing near Chain O'Lakes State Park. Then SR 9 enters Albion on the south part of town. In downtown Albion SR 9 has an intersection at the western terminus of State Road 8. SR 9 heads north out of Albion, then SR 9 has a concurrency with U.S. Route 6. It then heads north, passing through Rome City and Wolcottville. In Lagrange, SR 9 has an intersection with U.S. Route 20 and continues north towards the Michigan state line. Before the Michigan state line, SR 9 passes through an intersection with State Road 120 in Howe. Then just south of the Michigan state line, SR 9 has an intersection with the Indiana Toll Road (Interstate 80/Interstate 90). Then SR 9 crosses into Michigan as M-66 heading north toward Sturgis.

== History ==
From 1917 to 1926 the current route of SR 9 was known as State Road 11. With the SR 9 given to a route that went from Linton to Brazil and a second section from Rockville to Old State Road 10.

According to Google Maps images, by the Fall of 2025, SR 9 is now routed onto I-74 heading south toward Shelbyville and then onto SR 44 until resuming its original routing in Shelbyville.

== Explanation of nickname ==
The nickname of State Road 9 is Highway of Vice Presidents, from Shelbyville to Columbia City. The reason for the name is that four of Indiana's six Vice Presidents lived in cities along the route:

- Thomas A. Hendricks — Grover Cleveland's Vice President (1885) from Shelbyville
- Thomas R. Marshall — Woodrow Wilson's Vice President (1913–1921) from Columbia City
- Dan Quayle — George H.W. Bush's Vice President (1989–1993) from Huntington
- Mike Pence - Donald Trump's Vice President (2017–2021) from Columbus

Indiana's other two vice presidents are also honored by the highway nickname:

- Schuyler Colfax — Ulysses S. Grant's Vice President (1869–1873) from South Bend
- Charles W. Fairbanks — Theodore Roosevelt's Vice President (1905–1909) from Indianapolis

== Major intersections ==
| County | Location | mi | km | Exit | Destinations | Notes |
|---|---|---|---|---|---|---|
| Bartholomew | Clay–Clifty township line | 0.000 | 0.000 | | SR 46 to SR 7 / US 31 / I-65 – Columbus, Greensburg | Southern terminus of SR 9 |
| Shelby | Shelbyville | 18.999 | 30.576 | | Truck SR 9 north to I-74 / SR 44 | Southern end of Truck SR 9 |
| Shelby | Shelbyville | 20.749 | 33.392 | | SR 44 west (Colescott Street) – Franklin | Southern end of SR 44 concurrency |
| Shelby | Shelbyville | 21.111 | 33.975 | | SR 44 east (Broadway Street) / Truck SR 9 north – Rushville | Northern end of SR 44 concurrnecy; southern end of Truck SR 9 |
| Shelby | Shelbyville | 22.957– 23.196 | 36.946– 37.330 | | I-74 / US 421 / Truck SR 9 south – Indianapolis, Cincinnati | Exit number 113 on I-74 |
| Shelby | Van Buren Township | 33.039 | 53.171 | | US 52 – Indianapolis, Rushville | |
| Hancock | Greenfield | 39.545 | 63.642 | | US 40 – Indianapolis, Richmond | |
| Hancock | Greenfield | 41.943– 42.091 | 67.501– 67.739 | | I-70 – Indianapolis, Dayton | Exit number 104 on I-70 |
| Hancock | Green Township | 47.537 | 76.503 | | SR 234 | |
| Madison | Pendleton | 53.384 | 85.913 | | US 36 west / SR 67 south – Indianapolis | Southern end of US 36 and SR 67 concurrency |
| Madison | Pendleton | 54.885 | 88.329 | | SR 38 east – New Castle | Southern end of SR 38 concurrency |
| Madison | Pendleton | 55.045 | 88.586 | | US 36 east | Northern end of US 36 concurrency |
| Madison | Anderson | 57.617– 57.703 | 92.726– 92.864 | 222 | I-69 south – Indianapolis | Southern end of I-69 concurrency; Northern end of SR 38 |
| Madison | Anderson | 61.530 | 99.023 | 226 | I-69 north / SR 67 north / SR 109 south | Northern end of I-69 and SR 67 concurrency; Northern terminus of SR 109 |
| Madison | Anderson | 62.129 | 99.987 | | SR 236 east (53rd Street) – Middletown | Western terminus of SR 236 |
| Madison | Anderson | 64.222 | 103.355 | | SR 32 west (Ohio Avenue) / SR 232 east – Anderson | Southern end of SR 32 concurrency; Western terminus of SR 232 |
| Madison | Anderson | 65.675 | 105.694 | | SR 32 east (University Boulevard) – Muncie | |
| Madison | Richland Township | 73.286 | 117.942 | | SR 128 west – Frankton | Eastern terminus of SR 128 |
| Madison | Alexandria | 77.448 | 124.640 | | SR 28 – Elwood, Albany | |
| Grant | Fairmount | 87.437 | 140.716 | | SR 26 – Kokomo, Fairmount | |
| Grant | Marion | 91.429 | 147.141 | | US 35 / SR 22 – Kokomo, Gas City | |
| Grant | Marion | 93.643 | 150.704 | | SR 37 south – Elwood | Northern terminus of SR 37 |
| Grant | Marion | 94.387 | 151.901 | | SR 15 south (38th Street) – Gas City | Southern end of SR 15 concurrency |
| Grant | Marion | 96.824– 96.976 | 155.823– 156.068 | | SR 18 – Delphi, Montpelier | SR 18 runs along one-way pair of West 4th Street (eastbound) and West 2nd Street (westbound) |
| Grant | Marion | 98.036 | 157.774 | | SR 15 north (North Wabash Avenue) – Wabash | Northern end of SR 15 concurrency |
| Huntington | Wayne Township | 104.545 | 168.249 | | SR 105 north – South Whitley | Southern terminus of SR 105 |
| Huntington | Wayne Township | 105.323 | 169.501 | | SR 218 – La Fontaine, Warren | |
| Huntington | Mount Etna | 110.721 | 178.188 | | SR 124 – Peru, Bluffton | |
| Huntington | Huntington | 120.993 | 194.719 | | US 24 west – Wabash | Western end of US 24 concurrency |
| Huntington | Huntington | 122.818 | 197.656 | | US 224 east / SR 5 (North Jefferson Street / North Goshen Road) – Huntington, South Whitley | Western terminus of US 224 |
| Huntington | Huntington | 124.532– 124.616 | 200.415– 200.550 | | US 24 east – Fort Wayne | Eastern end of US 24 concurrency |
| Huntington | Clear Creek Township | 131.557 | 211.720 | | SR 114 – North Manchester, fort Wayne | |
| Whitley | Washington Township | 136.605 | 219.844 | | SR 14 – South Whitley, Fort Wayne | |
| Whitley | Columbia City | 141.480 | 227.690 | | SR 205 south (Radio Road) – South Whitley | Southern end of SR 205 concurrency |
| Whitley | Columbia City | 142.489 | 229.314 | | SR 205 north (Van Buren Street) – Churubusco | Northern end of SR 205 concurrency |
| Whitley | Columbia City | 143.330 | 230.667 | | US 30 – Wabash, Fort Wayne | |
| Noble | Noble Township | 152.616 | 245.612 | | US 33 – Goshen, Fort Wayne | |
| Noble | Albion | 160.323 | 258.015 | | SR 8 east – Avilla, Auburn | Western terminus of SR 8 |
| Noble | Elkhart–Orange township line | 164.291 | 264.401 | | US 6 west – Ligonier | Western end of US 6 concurrency |
| Noble | Orange Township | 167.137 | 268.981 | | US 6 east – Kendallville | Eastern end of US 6 concurrency |
| LaGrange | LaGrange | 181.292 | 291.761 | | US 20 (Central Avenue) – Elkhart, Angola | |
| LaGrange | Howe | 186.866 | 300.732 | | SR 120 (Defiance Street) – Elkhart, Fremont | |
| LaGrange | Lima Township | 189.329 | 304.695 | | I-80 Toll / I-90 Toll / Indiana Toll Road – South Bend, Toledo, Chicago | Exit 121 on I-80/I-90 |
| LaGrange | Lima Township | 189.586 | 305.109 | | M-66 north – Sturgis | Continuation into Michigan |
1.000 mi = 1.609 km; 1.000 km = 0.621 mi: Concurrency terminus; Tolled
