= U.S. Route 24 in Indiana =

Section of U.S. Highway in Indiana, United States

U.S. Route 24
- US 24 highlighted in red

Route information
- Maintained by INDOT
- Length: 166.846 mi (268.513 km)

Major junctions
- West end: US 24 / US 52 at the Illinois state line in Effner, IL
- US 41 / US 52 in Kentland; I-65 near Remington; US 421 in Monticello; US 35 near Logansport; US 31 near Peru; I-69 / US 33 near Fort Wayne; US 30 / US 33 / SR 930 in Fort Wayne; US 27 / SR 3 in Fort Wayne; I-69 / I-469 in Fort Wayne; I-469 / US 30 in New Haven
- East end: US 24 at the Ohio state line near Woodburn

Location
- Country: United States
- State: Indiana
- Counties: Newton, Jasper, White, Cass, Miami, Wabash, Huntington, Whitley, Allen

Highway system
- United States Numbered Highway System; List; Special; Divided; Indiana State Highway System; Interstate; US; State; Scenic
← SR 23	→ SR 25

U.S. Route 24 (US 24) in Indiana runs east from the Illinois state line to Huntington. At Huntington, US 24 turns northeast and runs to Fort Wayne; it then runs concurrently with Interstate 69 (I-69) and I-469 to bypass the city before entering Ohio at the state line east of Fort Wayne. The segment of US 24 between Logansport and Toledo, Ohio, is part of the Hoosier Heartland Industrial Corridor project of the Intermodal Surface Transportation Efficiency Act.

== Route description ==
=== Illinois to Logansport ===
This western section of US 24 is mostly rural two-lane. US 24 enters Indiana from Illinois concurrent with US 52. US 24 and US 52 head east toward Kentland, passing through an intersection with State Road 71 (SR 71). In Kentland, US 24 and US 52 have an intersection with US 41 where US 52 turns south. US 24 heads east from Kentland toward Remington, passing through a concurrency with SR 55. In Remington, US 24 starts a concurrency with US 231. US 24 and US 231 head east toward Wolcott, passing through an interchange with I-65. In Wolcott, US 231 heads south and US 24 heads east toward Reynolds. In Reynolds, US 24 has an intersection with SR 43 and starts a concurrency with US 421. US 24 and US 421 heads east toward Monticello. In Monticello, US 421 heads south with SR 39, US 24 now has a concurrency with SR 39. US 24 and SR 39 head east from Monticello. East of Monticello, SR 39 heads north, while US 24 heads east toward Logansport, passing through Idaville, Burnettsville, and Lake Cicott.

=== Logansport to Fort Wayne ===
This section is a four-lane rural divided highway. US 24 and US 35 have a concurrency around Logansport and have an interchange with SR 25 and an intersection with SR 29. East of Logansport, US 35 heads southeast toward Kokomo. US 24 heads east toward Peru, passing through an interchange with US 31. On the north side of Peru, US 24 has an intersection with SR 19. From Peru, US 24 heads east toward Wabash, passing through an intersection with SR 115. In Wabash, US 24 has intersections with SR 15 and SR 13. US 24 then heads toward Huntington passing through an intersection with SR 524 and a short concurrency with SR 105. On the west side of Huntington, US 24 begins a concurrency with SR 9. US 24 and SR 9 pass through an intersection with US 224/SR 5. North of Huntington, SR 9 heads north and US 24 heads northeast toward Fort Wayne. On the way to Fort Wayne, US 24 passes through an intersection with SR 114. Then, on the west side of Fort Wayne, US 24 enters onto northbound I-69.

=== Fort Wayne to Ohio ===
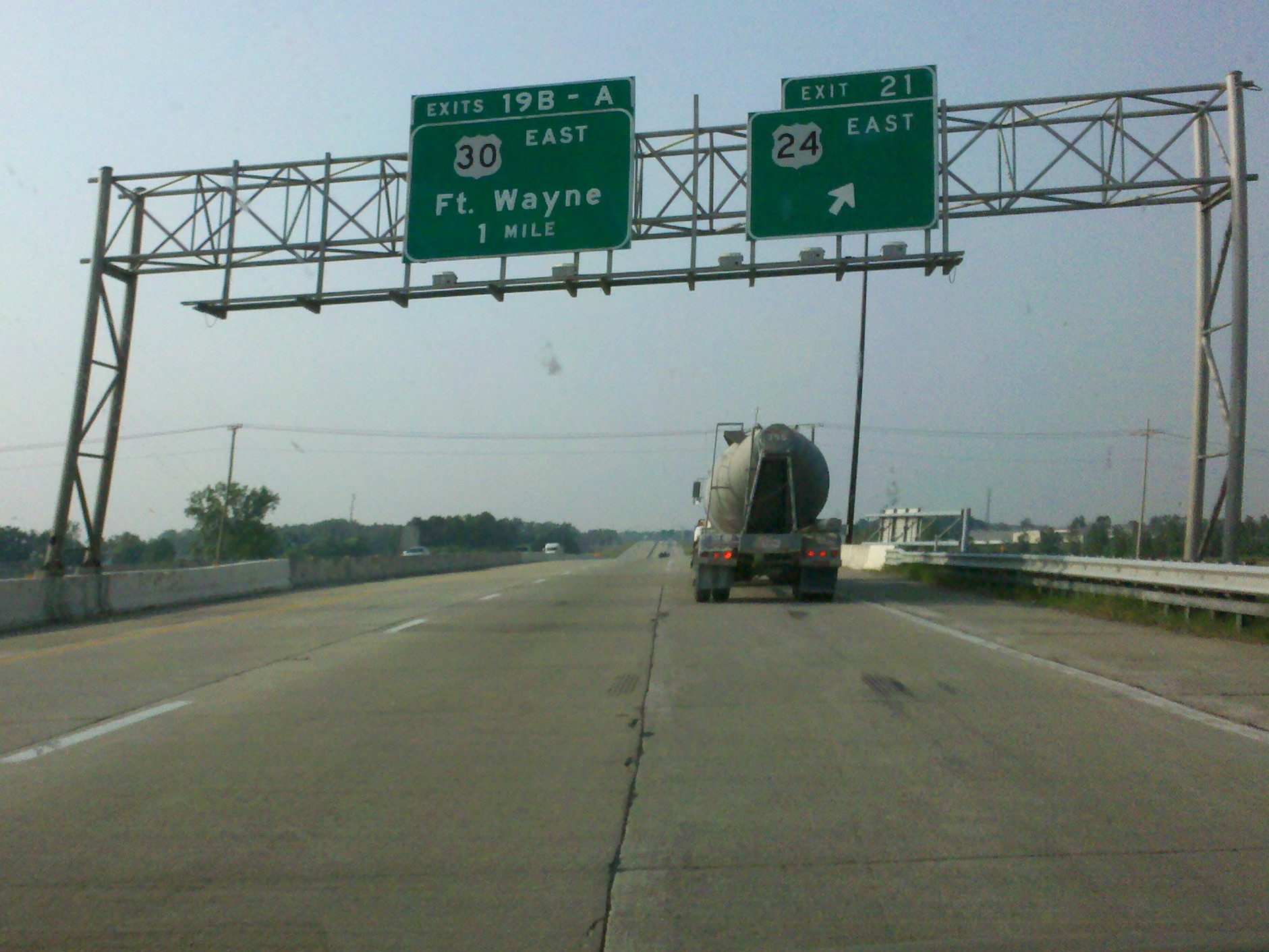
Exit sign for US 24 on southbound I-469 in New Haven

This section of US 24 is mostly freeway and includes overlaps with two Interstate Highways. US 24 merges onto I-69 heading north at that route's exit 302. US 24 (along with US 30) then leaves I-69 at exit 315 to head east then south along I-469. US 24 runs concurrently with I-469 until the east side of New Haven, passing through interchanges with Maplecrest Read and SR 37 along its path. US 24 leaves I-469 at exit 21 in New Haven, a conventional partial cloverleaf interchange, but, from there, heads northeast toward Ohio as a four-lane mostly Interstate standard rural freeway. After leaving I-469, the US 24 freeway has a substandard (short, low-speed Y-ramps of a right-in/right-out design) interchange with Bruick Road and Old US 24 in rural Allen County. Continuing past a standard diamond interchange at Webster Road, it follows a subsequent interchange with SR 101 in Woodburn. Beyond the SR 101 junction, US 24 enters Ohio, where the freeway ends but the route continues on in the Buckeye State as a four-lane divided rural arterial highway (though full access-control extends past the state line about another two miles [3.2 km]).

== History ==
=== Logansport to Fort Wayne ===
The original route of US 24 went through the city of Logansport, which then was a two-lane undivided rural highway north of the present four-lane highway from Logansport to a point near New Waverly. From there, the original facility ran south of today's four-lane roadway, through Peru and roughly paralleling the old Wabash Railroad (now Norfolk Southern Railway) mainline tracks into the city of Wabash. Between that city and the Wabash County town of Largo, the old road still is south of the present alignment, but, from there to the west side of Huntington (at SR 9), the present four-lane facility replaced the original two-lane road. US 24 originally went through the city of Huntington but now is bypassed to the west and north by the modern alignment. From east of Huntington to Fort Wayne, the four-lane roadway was built over the two-lane highway, then known as Upper Huntington Road.

=== Fort Wayne to New Haven ===
Before US 24 was rerouted onto I-69 and I-469, US 24 passed through both Fort Wayne and its eastern suburb, New Haven. It entered the metropolitan area concurrent with SR 37 on Upper Huntington Road (now Jefferson Boulevard) and picked up another concurrency with former SR 14 at Illinois Road on the west side of the city. This was also the point where Upper Huntington Road transitioned to being Jefferson Boulevard. US 24 and the state roads crossed the St. Marys River in Swinney Park then became split through downtown Fort Wayne on a one-way pair of streets, with Jefferson Boulevard and then Maumee Avenue carrying eastbound traffic and Washington Boulevard handling westbound travel. East of downtown, SR 37 left the one-way pair of Maumee and Washington at Anthony Boulevard, departing to the north. The one-way pair merged onto Washington Blvd just east of Memorial Park, near Edsall Avenue on the east side.

Just east of Fort Wayne, US 24 had an interchange with the Bueter Road alignment of the original 1953 US 30 "Bypass" (later renamed Coliseum Boulevard). From that tight cloverleaf interchange to the east, US 24 and SR 14 were concurrent with US 30 (now SR 930) and they then bridged the Nickel Plate Railroad (now Norfolk Southern Railway) mainline before merging onto New Haven Avenue, heading due east toward that suburb. Then US 24 and SR 14 headed into downtown New Haven, with US 30 splitting off to the south to bypass central New Haven. Just beyond that split, US 24 turned north onto Broadway Street, with SR 14 continuing due east along Dawkins Road to Ohio. On Broadway, US 24 crossed the Nickel Plate railroad mainline at-grade and then curved slightly north-northwest through downtown New Haven before turning east onto Rose Avenue which led out of town (and past the point which later would become the I-469 interchange) as the old alignment which was later replaced by the modern freeway.

In the early 1980s, US 24 was rerouted out of downtown Fort Wayne, following I-69 north to US 30/Coliseum Boulevard (now SR 930), and then following Coliseum Boulevard around the northern and eastern sides of the city to the cloverleaf interchange at Washington Boulevard. When the southeastern portions of I-469 opened to traffic in 1989, US 24 was rerouted again, this time onto I-69 south, then I-469 at I-69's (then exit 96, now exit 296) to the current interchange with US 24 east of New Haven. This resulted in a "doubling back" to the south-southwest from the Jefferson Boulevard interchange (then exit 101, now exit 301) along I-69 to reach I-469's south junction with I-69. Many savvy through travelers on US 24 simply left that route in Huntington County and turned east onto County Road 900 (CR 900) North at Roanoke, which becomes Lafayette Center Road at the Allen County line), and which about six miles (9.7 km) after leaving US 24 deposited them directly onto eastbound I-469 and (at the time) US 24 at the I-69 interchange. Though this deviation was along a two-lane road, it saved them several miles of unnecessary out-of-the-way travel along the officially shielded route.

After the original two-lane alignment east of New Haven along the Maumee River was bypassed by the present four-lane freeway in 2012, US 24 was again officially rerouted to its present posted alignment, using the northern loop of I-469, via I-69 north. Many through travelers, however, still use CR 900 South/Lafayette Center Road (both now widened and improved) to I-469 east and north route as it remains far shorter and more direct than the officially designated US 24 northern bypass of the Summit City and its eastern suburb.

=== Fort to Port ===
==== 2008–2012 upgrades ====
Fort to Port was first brought up in a meeting by Indiana State Representative Mitch Harper, in 1989. The project went from New Haven, to Toledo, Ohio. It was at this meeting the project name "Fort to Port" was born. The most complex and expensive portion of the Indiana segment was to be reconstructing the partial cloverleaf interchange with I-469 in New Haven.

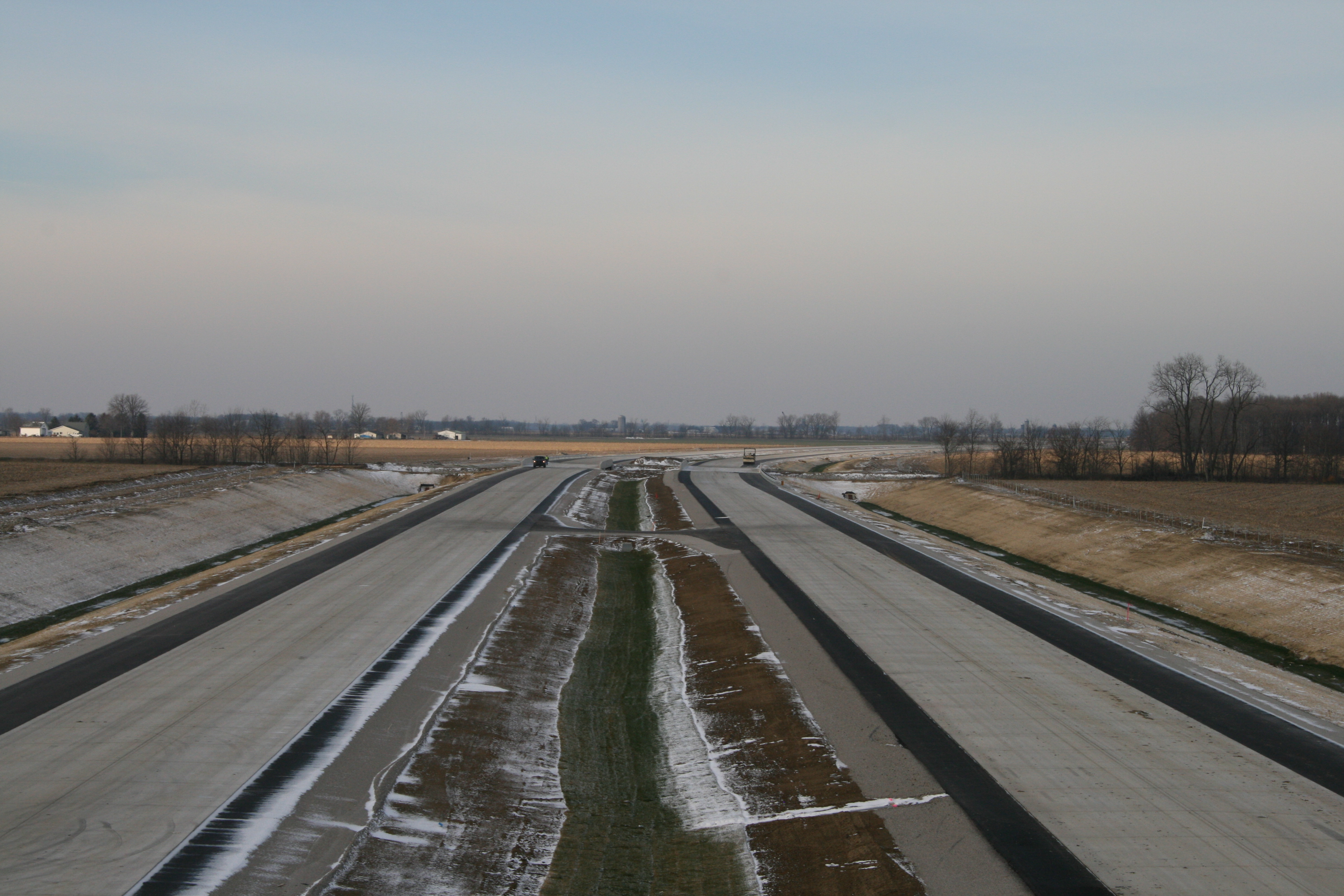
(December 2008) Completed section of US 24 Fort-to-Port Freeway in eastern Indiana. This segment opened to traffic on October 29, 2009.

In November 2007, Indiana announced it would reduce costs by changing its segment to be an expressway with at-grade intersections at Bruick Road, Webster Road, and SR 101, instead of a freeway section with interchanges and overpasses. The only overpasses would be two narrow 12-foot-wide (3.7 m) overpasses for non-motorized traffic (Amish buggies) to cross US 24. Also, the interchange of I-469 and US 24 would remain as is with traffic signals at the US 24 ramp terminals. The cost savings without interchanges would be approximately $75 million–80 million (equivalent to $109 million–116 million in 2024). Right-of-way would be purchased for future interchanges. This change has been unpopular due to safety concerns with the heavy truck traffic on the corridor. The Indiana Department of Transportation (INDOT) claimed that the current traffic on US 24 does not justify interchanges, even though the 2005 final environmental impact study (EIS) states that it does.

Responding to widespread public outcry over the scaled-back design, Governor Mitch Daniels announced on December 12, 2007, that US 24 would be built as a freeway initially from Bruick Road to the Ohio state line, with interchanges at SR 101 and Webster Road. The intersection with Bruick Road was to have initially been an at-grade crossing, but INDOT announced in August 2009 that a grade-separated, right in, right out (RIRO) interchange was to be built here as well. Indiana's entire 13.5-mile (21.7 km) segment of US 24 was completed as a freeway. The interchange with I-469, however, was unchanged and not free-flowing in all traffic movements.

Upon completion, ownership of the existing US 24 was transferred to Allen County and became a frontage road east of Bruick Road, providing access to the BFGoodrich tire plant and adjacent homes and farmland. Indiana financed construction through the Major Moves program and will be reimbursed when federal highway funds become available. Sections of the two-lane road that have been bypassed by the freeway are now locally signed as "Old US 24".

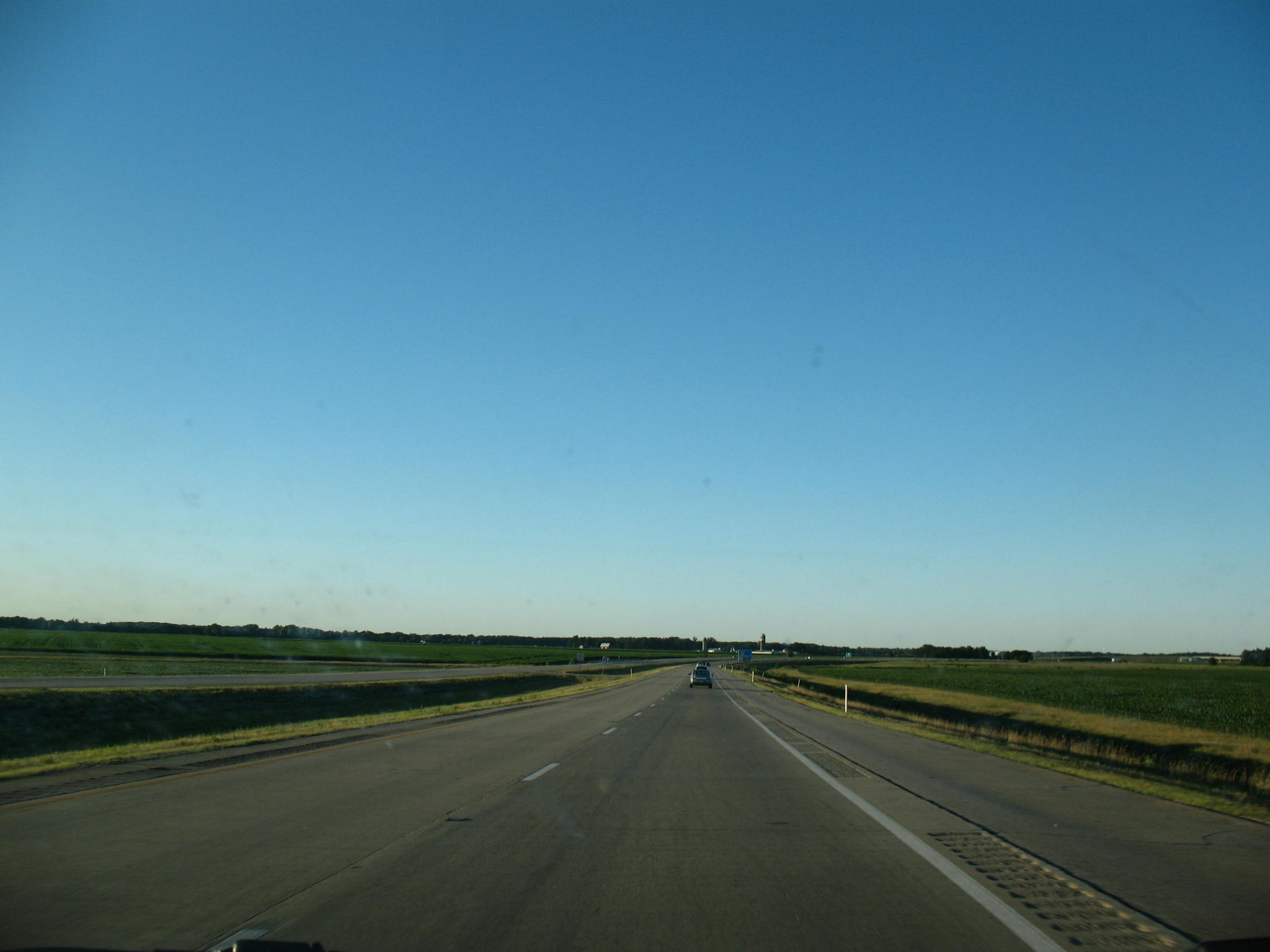
Part of the new US 24 "Fort to Port" freeway in Eastern Indiana in 2018

Governor Daniels and INDOT held the groundbreaking ceremony for the Indiana section on April 30, 2008. By December 2008, crews had completed construction on two miles (3.2 km) of the freeway from the Ohio state line to just east of the SR 101 interchange. On October 29, 2009, Governor Daniels and Ohio Governor Ted Strickland held a ribbon-cutting ceremony at the Indiana–Ohio state line opening the new US 24 highway from SR 101 near Woodburn to State Route 424 near Defiance, Ohio. The project was designated completed, and the final segment opened on November 4, 2012.

==== Interchange with I-469 ====
In the original plans, INDOT intended to upgrade the I-469/US 24 interchange to allow free-flowing movements between the two highways as documented in the Fort-to-Port final EIS published in 2005. This included building a 2,200-foot (670 m) flyover ramp from eastbound US 24 to southbound I-469. Five years later, no work had been performed on this interchange.

In May 2017, INDOT announced that a modification to the original plan was in process. The long proposed flyover was being replaced with two significantly shorter bridges. Furthermore, the interchange was going to be upgraded in two phases. The initial phase mostly entailed the eastern half of the intersection, specifically both northbound I-469 to eastbound US 24 and westbound US 24 to northbound I-469 were converted to free-flowing movements. This first phase was fully opened to traffic in fall 2020. After a change in land use, phase 2 went through another redesign in March 2022 and a decision was made to completely replace the flyovers with a conventional loop ramp. Construction contract should be awarded in January 2024 with construction to begin that spring. The original I-469/US 24 parclo interchange was upgraded to a full cloverleaf interchange, allowing free-flow movements between both highways, but at relatively low speeds.

== Major intersections ==
County	Location	mi	km	Exit	Destinations	Notes
Newton	Jefferson Township	0.000	0.000		US 24 west / US 52 west – Sheldon, Watseka	Continuation into Illinois
Newton	Jefferson Township	1.815	2.921		SR 71 south – Raub	Northern terminus of SR 71
Newton	Kentland	4.616	7.429		US 41 / US 52 east – Terre Haute, Lafayette, Hammond	Eastern end of US 52 concurrency
Newton	Goodland	10.566	17.004		SR 55 south – Fowler	Western end of SR 55 concurrency
Newton	Goodland	11.065	17.807		SR 55 north – Crown Point	Eastern end of SR 55 concurrecny
Jasper	Remington	19.537	31.442		US 231 north – Rensselaer	Western end of US 231 concurrency
Jasper	Remington	21.236– 21.405	34.176– 34.448		I-65 – Indianapolis, Gary, Chicago	
White	Wolcott	26.270	42.277		US 231 south – Lafayette	Eastern end of US 231 concurrency
White	Reynolds	35.098	56.485		US 421 north / SR 43 south – Michigan City, Lafayette	Western end of US 421 concurrency; northern terminus of SR 43
White	Monticello	41.012	66.002		US 421 south / SR 39 south – Delphi, Frankfort, Indianapolis	Eastern end of US 421 concurrency; western end of SR 39 concurrency
White	Union Township	42.276	68.037		SR 39 north – Buffalo	Eastern end of SR 39 concurrency
Cass	Logansport	60.840	97.912		US 35 north / US 24 Bus. east – La Porte, Logansport	Western end of US 35 concurrency; western end of Bus. US 24
Cass	Logansport	62.182	100.072	—	Old State Road 25	Interchange
Cass	Logansport	62.982	101.360		SR 25 south / SR 29 south – Lafayette, Delphi	Split diamond interchange, together with interchange for SR 25 north; western end of SR 25 concurrency; northern terminus of SR 29
Cass	Logansport	63.257	101.802	—	SR 25 north / SR 329 south	Split diamond interchange, together with interchange for SR 25 south; eastern end of SR 25 concurrency; northern terminus of SR 329
Cass	Logansport	67.171	108.101		US 35 south – Kokomo	Eastern end of US 35 concurrency
Cass	Miami Township	74.444	119.806		US 24 Bus. west / Logansport Road	Eastern end of Bus. US 24
Miami	Peru Township	77.451	124.645	—	US 31 – Indianapolis, Kokomo, Plymouth, South Bend	
Miami	Peru	81.218	130.708		SR 19 – Converse, Akron	
Wabash	Noble Township	92.028	148.105		SR 115 north	Southern terminus of SR 115
Wabash	Wabash	94.018	151.307		SR 15 – Marion, Wabash, Warsaw	
Wabash	Wabash	96.464	155.244		SR 13 – Noblesville, Wabash, North Manchester	
Wabash	Lagro	98.553	158.606		SR 524 south – Lagro	Western terminus of SR 524
Huntington	Dallas Township	106.531	171.445		SR 105 north – South Whitley	Western end of SR 105 concurrency
Huntington	Andrews	107.659	173.260		SR 105 south – Banquo	Eastern end of SR 105 concurrency
Huntington	Huntington	111.700	179.764		SR 9 south – Marion, Anderson	Southern end of SR 9 concurrency
Huntington	Huntington	113.525	182.701		US 224 east / SR 5 – Huntington, Decatur, Warren	Western terminus of US 224
Huntington	Huntington Township	115.239	185.459	—	SR 9 north – Columbia City	Northern end of SR 9 concurrency
Huntington	Huntington Township	116.424	187.366	—	Old US 24	Westbound exit and eastbound entrance
Huntington–Whitley county line	Jackson–Jefferson township line	126.817	204.092		SR 114 west – North Manchester	Eastern terminus of SR 114
Allen	Fort Wayne	131.151– 132.316	211.067– 212.942		I-69 south / US 33 south / Jefferson Boulevard – Indianapolis, Fort Wayne International Airport	Western end of I-69 / US 33 concurrency
Allen	Fort Wayne	135.553	218.151	305	SR 14 west / Illinois Road	Signed as exits 305A (east) and 305B (west)
Allen	Fort Wayne	139.509	224.518	309	US 30 west / US 33 north SR 930 east / Goshen Road	Eastern end of US 33 concurrency; western end of US 30 concurrency; signed as exits 309A (east) and 309B (west / north); western end of SR 930
Allen	Fort Wayne	141.290	227.384	311	US 27 south / SR 3 north (Lima Road)	Signed as exits 311A (south) and 311B (north); northern terminus of US 27; southern terminus of the northern section of SR 3
Allen	Fort Wayne	142.592	229.480	312	Coldwater Road	Signed as exits 312A (south) and 312B (north)
Allen	Fort Wayne	145.335	233.894	315; 31	I-69 north – Lansing, MI I-469 east Auburn Road	Eastern end of I-69 concurrency; west end of I-469 concurrency; westbound exit only to Auburn Road; exit 315 on I-69 and exit 31 on I-469
Allen	St. Joseph Township	147.590	237.523	29	Maplecrest Road	Signed as exits 29A (north) and 29B (south) eastbound
Allen	Fort Wayne	151.582	243.948	25	SR 37 north / Maysville Road – Fort Wayne	Southern end of the northern segment of SR 37
Allen	Jefferson Township	155.283	249.904	21	I-469 south / US 30 east – New Haven, Fort Wayne International Airport	Eastern end of I-469 / US 30 concurrency
Allen	Milan Township	157.348	253.227	—	Bruick Road	Interchange (sub-Interstate standards; right-in, right-out (RIRO))
Allen	Milan Township	158.472	255.036	—	Webster Road	Interchange
Allen	Maumee Township	164.239	264.317	—	SR 101 – Woodburn	Interchange
Allen	Maumee Township	166.846	268.513		US 24 east – Defiance, Napoleon, Toledo	Continuation into Ohio
1.000 mi = 1.609 km; 1.000 km = 0.621 mi: Concurrency terminus; Incomplete access

== See also ==
U.S. Route 24
Previous state: Illinois	Indiana	Next state: Ohio
