= Clear Creek Township, Huntington County, Indiana =

Clear Creek Township
- Township
- Location in Huntington County
- Coordinates: 40°57′28″N 85°30′45″W
- Country: United States
- State: Indiana
- County: Huntington

Government
  - Type: Indiana township

Area
  - Total: 35.89 sq mi (93.0 km^{2})
  - Land: 35.67 sq mi (92.4 km^{2})
  - Water: 0.22 sq mi (0.57 km^{2}) 0.61%
- Elevation: 817 ft (249 m)

Population (2020)
  - Total: 1,984
  - Density: 55.62/sq mi (21.48/km^{2})
- GNIS feature ID: 0453221

Clear Creek Township is one of twelve townships in Huntington County, Indiana, United States. As of the 2020 census, its population was 1,984 (slightly up from 1,928 at 2010) and it contained 750 housing units.

== History ==
Clear Creek Township was organized in 1838. It was named from Clear Creek, the largest stream within its borders.

== Geography ==
According to the 2010 census, the township has a total area of 35.89 square miles (93.0 km^{2}), of which 35.67 square miles (92.4 km^{2}) (or 99.39%) is land and 0.22 square miles (0.57 km^{2}) (or 0.61%) is water. The stream of Flint Creek runs through this township.

=== Unincorporated towns ===
- Goblesville

=== Adjacent townships ===
- Washington Township, Whitley County (north)
- Jefferson Township, Whitley County (northeast)
- Jackson Township (east)
- Union Township (southeast)
- Huntington Township (south)
- Dallas Township (southwest)
- Warren Township (west)
- Cleveland Township, Whitley County (northwest)

=== Major highways ===
- Indiana State Road 5
- Indiana State Road 9
- Indiana State Road 113
- Indiana State Road 114
