= Taibi Kahler =

American clinical psychologist and author

Taibi Kahler (born 1943) is an American clinical psychologist and author. He added the concepts of the Mini-script and Drivers to Transactional analysis theory, for which he received the 1977 Eric Berne Memorial Scientific Award from the International Transactional Analysis Association (ITAA).

== Early life and education ==
Kahler was born June 30, 1943 in Kewanna, Indiana. He was the only child of George Kahler, a farmer, and Madelyn Kahler. His father died in combat in April 1945 while serving in the US Army in the European theater, resulting in Kahler being raised by his single mother in Hammond, Indiana. He has indicated that it was a financially poor, but loving upbringing. Kahler attended Hope College, in Holland, Michigan, before transferring to Purdue University where he graduated with B.A. in English Literature, an M.S., and a Ph.D. in Child Development and Family Life (1972).

A member of the ITAA, Kahler served successively as board of trustees member, vice president, and editorial board member of the Transactional Analysis Journal (TAJ).

== Work ==
=== Drivers and the Miniscript ===
Working in the early 1970s, Kahler observed human interactions second by second, building on Eric Berne's work on life scripts. He identified five discrete sets of brief, repetitive behaviors (which he termed drivers) that consistently preceded distressed behavior. These observations led to the formulation of the miniscript theory, first published in the Transactional Analysis Journal in 1974 with Hedges Capers, and further developed in "Drivers: The Key to the Process of Scripts" in 1975. For this work, Kahler received the 1977 Eric Berne Memorial Scientific Award, granted by the ITAA membership for the most important scientific discovery of the year in that field.

=== Process Communication Model ===
Drawing on his clinical work on observable behaviors and psychological distress, Kahler developed Process Communication Model (PCM), a personality and communication model. Distinct from Process Therapy Model (PTM), which is intended for therapeutic settings, PCM was designed for applications in management, education, coaching, and interpersonal communication.

The model describes six personality types: Harmonizer, Thinker, Persister, Imaginer, Rebel, and Promoter. According to PCM, individuals possess all six personality types arranged in a unique structure known as a "Personality Structure," which influences their perceptions, psychological needs, communication preferences, and reactions to stress.

Kahler also developed the Personality Pattern Inventory (PPI), a questionnaire used to determine an individual's personality profile.

== NASA collaboration ==
From the late 1970s onward, Kahler was invited by Dr. Terence McGuire, NASA's lead psychiatrist for manned spaceflight, to observe astronaut selection interviews. McGuire found that Kahler was able, within approximately ten minutes of observation, to produce a behavioral profile as accurate as his own conclusions drawn from a full psychological interview of several hours. The model was used by NASA for nearly two decades to assess crew psychological compatibility and prevent in-mission conflict.

== Advisory Role to Bill Clinton ==
In 1984, Kahler met Bill Clinton, then Governor of Arkansas. He subsequently served as an advisor on psychodemographics during Clinton's presidential campaigns, contributing to the adaptation of speeches to different personality profiles within the electorate. Clinton described Kahler as "a genius" who "knows more about personality dynamics than anyone I know in the world."

== Recent Research ==
Kahler's models have been the subject of several recent peer-reviewed studies. In neuroscience, an fMRI study conducted at the University Hospital of Tours (Oprea et al., 2025) identified distinct cerebral correlates for four of the six PCM profiles. A study published in PLOS One(Lefebvre & Beaucousin, 2023) demonstrated that global and local visual processing varies according to PCM personality type. In the medical field, a study of 311 surgeons and healthcare professionals (Andrew et al., 2021) reported a positive perceived impact of PCM training on professional relationships and well-being.

== Publications ==
- The Mastery of Management (2006), ISBN 978-0970118523
- The Process Therapy Model: The Six Personality Types with Adaptations (2008), ISBN 978-0981656502
- Transactional analysis revisited (1978), Little Rock, AR: Human Development Publications
- Process therapy in brief: the clinical application of miniscript (1979), Little Rock, Ark, Human Development Publications
- NoTAtions: A guide to TA literature (1978), with Brown, M. Dexter, Mich: Huron Valley Institute
