= Indiana State Road 14 =

State highway in Indiana, United States

State Road 14
- SR 14 highlighted in red

Route information
- Maintained by INDOT
- Length: 122.976 mi (197.911 km)

Major junctions
- West end: US 41 at Enos
- I-65 near Rensselaer; US 421 near Medaryville; US 35 at Winamac; US 31 at Rochester
- East end: I-69 / US 24 / US 33 at Fort Wayne

Location
- Country: United States
- State: Indiana
- Counties: Allen, Fulton, Jasper, Kosciusko, Newton, Pulaski, Whitley

Highway system
- Indiana State Highway System; Interstate; US; State; Scenic
← SR 13	→ SR 15

State Road 14 is an east–west highway route which traverses the northern portion of the U.S. state of Indiana. Its western terminus is at U.S. Route 41 in Enos, and since 1995 its eastern terminus is at Interstate 69 in Fort Wayne.

== Route description ==
SR 14 begins at the intersection of US 41 in Enos. The route travels eastward in a straight direction for 11 miles (18 km). Along the way, the route meets SR 55 and I-65. The route then turns north for 1 mile (1.6 km) before traveling eastward again. For the next 18 miles (29 km), the route serves Parr, US 231, SR 49 in Lewiston, and US 421. SR 14 travels north along US 421 for 2 miles (3.2 km) before turning east. On its way toward Winamac, SR 14 intersects with SR 39. In Winamac, the route travels along 11th Street, then turns north along US 35 for about 1 1/2 blocks, and turns east along 13th Street. After crossing the Tippecanoe River, the road shifts slightly southward. As SR 14 approaches Rochester, the route intersects with SR 17. Just before entering Rochester, SR 14 crosses over US 31 without a direct interchange. Also, the road becomes 18th Street. After turning north along SR 25 (Main Street), both routes enter the downtown area. Both routes then turn east along 9th Street. Just adjacent to the Fulton County Airport and Lake Manitou, SR 25 turns north, while SR 14 continues eastward.

At this point, SR 14 meanders eastward, serving Athens and SR 19 in Akron. Also in Akron, SR 14 turns north, while thru traffic continues as SR 114. For 2.3 miles (3.7 km), the route parallels SR 19 with 1/2 mile (0.80 km) of space in between the two. SR 14 then turns east. On its way toward South Whitley, the route serves the following: SR 15 in Silver Lake, SR 13, and Collamer. Between Collamer and South Whitley, the route parallels the Eel River. In South Whitley, the route travels north along Main Street, east along Wayne Street, and southeast along SR 5 (State Street). After crossing the Eel River, SR 14 turns eastward at the intersection of SR 5/SR 105. For the remainder of the route, SR 14 intersects with SR 9, then becomes Illinois Road, and meets I-69/US 24/US 33 in Fort Wayne. At this point, the route ends and the road continues as Illinois Road.

== History ==
Prior to 1926 SR 14 was routed between Cannelton and St. Croix, passing through Tell City. In 1926 when Indiana State Highway Commission renumbered the state roads, the SR 14 designation went unused. The SR 14 designation was used again in 1931 between Fort Wayne and the Ohio state line, along a section that later became part of SR 37. During 1931 or 1932, new sections of SR 14 became designated routes between the Illinois state line and SR 53, now US 231, and again from SR 43, now US 421, to Fort Wayne. In this year, SR 14 between SR 53 and SR 43 was an authorized state road. In either late 1932 or early 1933, the route's western end moved to US 41, while a new authorized section of SR 14 was routed between US 41 and SR 43, passing through Fair Oaks and Gifford. During 1933, the new authorized route was dropped from the state road system and the road between SR 13 and South Whitley was rerouted onto its modern route. Also at this time, SR 14 was authorized between the Illinois state line and US 41 and authorized from SR 55 to SR 43. Between 1934 and 1935, the authorized section became part of the state road system, It had a driving surface of either gravel or stone.

Between 1939 and 1941, SR 14 was rerouted from Fort Wayne to Ohio state line, passing through New Haven. This routing replaced SR 230 from New Haven towards the east. The former route of SR 14 became part of SR 37. The section of road between the Illinois state line and US 41 was removed from the state road between 1947 and 1948. The rest of the roadway was paved in either 1966 or 1967. The eastern end of SR 14 was moved from the Ohio state line to the interchange with I-69 between 1993 and 1995. The interchange between SR 14 and I-65 was opened in July 2005. Widening along SR 14 between Scott Road and Hadley Road was completed in August 2010.

=== SR 230 ===
State Road 230
- Location: New Haven – Edgerton
- Length: 11.3 mi (18.2 km)
- Existed: 1932–1941

SR 230 was an east–west state road in Allen, running between New Haven and Ohio state line, in Edgerton. The highway began at an intersection with US 24 in New Haven and SR 230 heading east and parallel to the south of the New York Central railroad track. SR 230 headed towards and passed through an intersection with SR 101, before entering Edgerton and ending at the Ohio state line. The roadway continued east as Ohio State Route 113. SR 230 was formed in 1932, running mostly north of the New York Central railroad tracks. Between 1937 and 1938, the road was moved south of the railroad tracks. The entire route of SR 230 became part of SR 14 between 1939 and 1941. SR 14 was decommissioned along this section of roadway between 1993 and 1995 and it became county roads upon the decommission of SR 14.

== Major intersections ==
County	Location	mi	km	Destinations	Notes
Newton	Enos	0.000	0.000	US 41 – Terre Haute	Western Terminus of SR 14
Newton	Enos	6.137	9.877	SR 55 – Fowler, Crown Point	
Jasper	Newton Township	9.229– 9.558	14.853– 15.382	I-65 – Indianapolis, Gary	
Jasper	Union Township	16.602	26.718	US 231 – Lafayette, Crown Point	
Jasper	Barkley Township	22.099	35.565	SR 49 north – Porter	Southern terminus of SR 49
Pulaski	White Post Township	30.129	48.488	US 421 south – Indianapolis	Southern end of US 421 concurrency
Pulaski	White Post Township	32.000	51.499	US 421 north – Michigan City	Northern end of US 421 concurrency
Pulaski	Jefferson Township	38.084	61.290	SR 39 – Frankfort, La Porte	
Pulaski	Winamac	47.067	75.747	US 35 south – Logansport	Southern end of US 35 concurrency
Pulaski	Winamac	47.193	75.950	US 35 north – La Porte	Northern end of US 35 concurrency
Fulton	Union Township	56.526	90.970	SR 17 – Logansport, Plymouth	
Fulton	Rochester	67.334	108.364	SR 25 south to US 31 – Logansport	Western end of SR 25 concurrency
Fulton	Rochester	69.296	111.521	SR 25 north – Warsaw	Eastern end of SR 25 concurrency
Fulton	Akron	78.443	126.242	SR 19 – Peru, Elkhart	
Kosciusko	Silver Lake	87.686	141.117	SR 15 – Wabash, Goshen	
Kosciusko	Jackson Township	95.453	153.617	SR 13 – Wabash, Syracuse	
Whitley	South Whitley	101.749	163.749	SR 5 north – Ligonier	Western end of SR 5 concurrency
Whitley	South Whitley	102.331	164.686	SR 5 south / SR 105 south – Huntington	Eastern end of SR 5 concurrency; northern end of SR 105
Whitley	Washington Township	110.273	177.467	SR 9 – Huntington, Columbia City	
Allen	Fort Wayne	122.976	197.911	I-69 / US 24 / US 33 – Indianapolis, Fort Wayne, Lansing	Eastern terminus of SR 14
1.000 mi = 1.609 km; 1.000 km = 0.621 mi: Concurrency terminus
