= Kewanna, Indiana =

Town in Indiana, United States

Town of Kewanna, Indiana
- Town
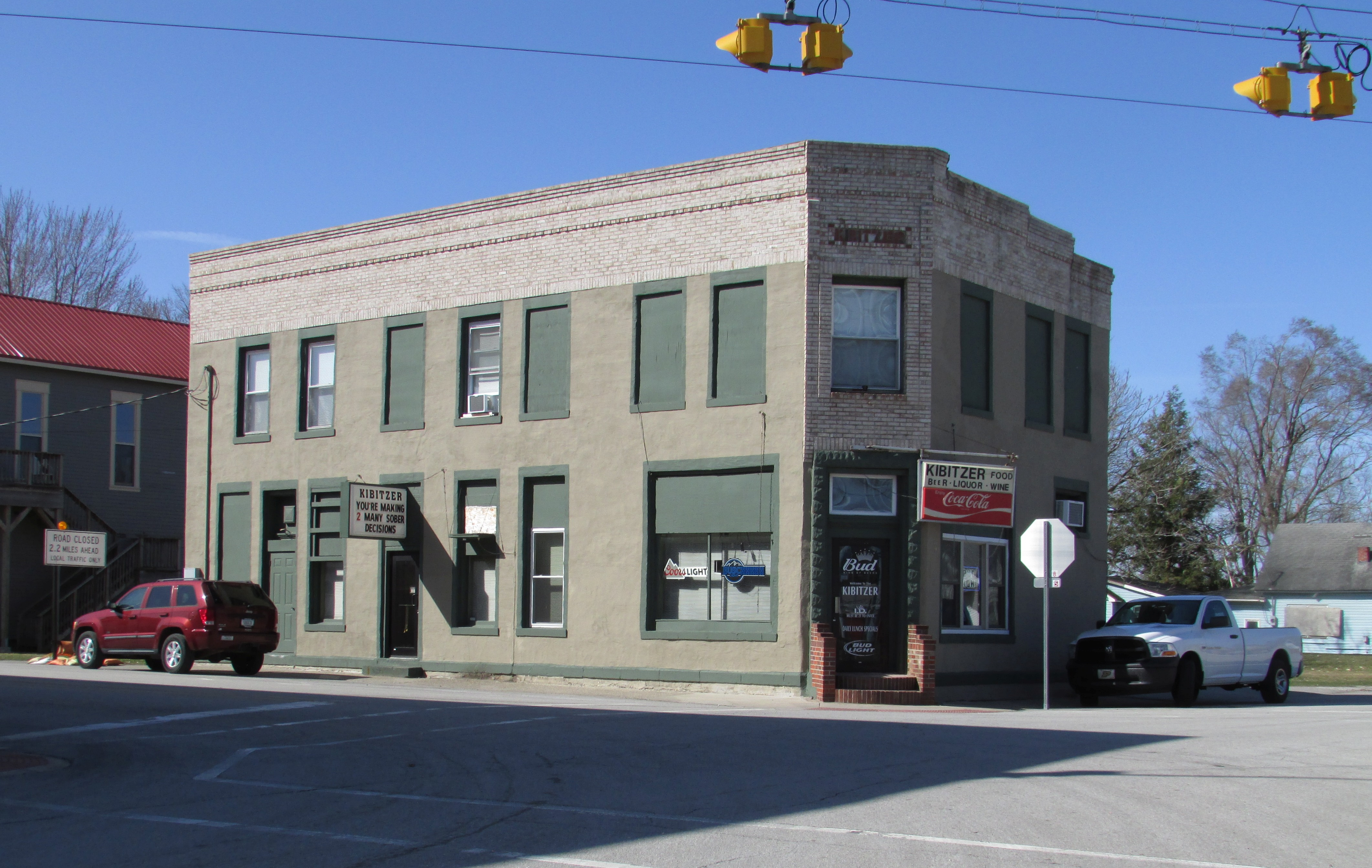
- 101 E. Main Street, Kewanna, Indiana

- Location of Kewanna in Fulton County, Indiana.
- Coordinates: 41°01′10″N 86°24′45″W
- Country: United States
- State: Indiana
- County: Fulton
- Township: Union

Area
  - Total: 0.55 sq mi (1.42 km^{2})
  - Land: 0.55 sq mi (1.42 km^{2})
  - Water: 0 sq mi (0.00 km^{2})
- Elevation: 781 ft (238 m)

Population (2020)
  - Total: 576
  - Density: 1,051.5/sq mi (405.97/km^{2})
- Time zone: UTC-5 (EST)
  - Summer (DST): UTC-5 (EST)
- ZIP codes: 46935, 46939
- Area code: 574
- FIPS code: 18-39618
- GNIS feature ID: 2397016

Kewanna is a town in Union Township, Fulton County, Indiana, United States. As of the 2020 census, Kewanna had a population of 576.

== History ==
A post office was established at Kewanna in 1847. The community was named for Kee-Wau-Nay, a Potawatomi chief.

== Geography ==
According to the 2010 census, Kewanna has a total area of 0.53 square miles (1.37 km^{2}), all land.

== Demographics ==
Historical population
Census	Pop.	Note	%±
1880	283		—
1890	647		128.6%
1900	646		−0.2%
1910	728		12.7%
1920	695		−4.5%
1930	682		−1.9%
1940	701		2.8%
1950	680		−3.0%
1960	683		0.4%
1970	614		−10.1%
1980	711		15.8%
1990	542		−23.8%
2000	614		13.3%
2010	613		−0.2%
2020	576		−6.0%
U.S. Decennial Census

=== 2010 census ===
As of the census of 2010, there were 613 people, 251 households, and 149 families residing in the town. The population density was 1,156.6 inhabitants per square mile (446.6/km^{2}). There were 283 housing units at an average density of 534.0 per square mile (206.2/km^{2}). The racial makeup of the town was 96.2% White, 1.1% African American, 0.3% Native American, 0.2% Asian, 0.2% from other races, and 2.0% from two or more races. Hispanic or Latino of any race were 2.1% of the population.

There were 251 households, of which 35.9% had children under the age of 18 living with them, 40.2% were married couples living together, 13.9% had a female householder with no husband present, 5.2% had a male householder with no wife present, and 40.6% were non-families. 35.9% of all households were made up of individuals, and 18.3% had someone living alone who was 65 years of age or older. The average household size was 2.44 and the average family size was 3.15.

The median age in the town was 35.2 years. 28.4% of residents were under the age of 18; 8.8% were between the ages of 18 and 24; 24.5% were from 25 to 44; 25.1% were from 45 to 64; and 13.2% were 65 years of age or older. The gender makeup of the town was 48.1% male and 51.9% female.

=== 2000 census ===
As of the census of 2000, there were 614 people, 269 households, and 157 families residing in the town. The population density was 1,171.5 inhabitants per square mile (452.3/km^{2}). There were 297 housing units at an average density of 566.7 per square mile (218.8/km^{2}). The racial makeup of the town was 98.37% White, 0.33% African American, 0.49% Native American, 0.16% Asian, 0.16% Pacific Islander, 0.16% from other races, and 0.33% from two or more races. Hispanic or Latino of any race were 0.81% of the population.

There were 269 households, out of which 28.3% had children under the age of 18 living with them, 45.7% were married couples living together, 7.4% had a female householder with no husband present, and 41.6% were non-families. 37.5% of all households were made up of individuals, and 20.4% had someone living alone who was 65 years of age or older. The average household size was 2.28 and the average family size was 2.99.

In the town the population was spread out, with 26.2% under the age of 18, 7.0% from 18 to 24, 26.5% from 25 to 44, 21.8% from 45 to 64, and 18.4% who were 65 years of age or older. The median age was 39 years. For every 100 females, there were 102.0 males. For every 100 females age 18 and over, there were 97.0 males.

The median income for a household in the town was $22,292, and the median income for a family was $41,250. Males had a median income of $31,607 versus $20,139 for females. The per capita income for the town was $15,718. About 6.0% of families and 13.0% of the population were below the poverty line, including 9.9% of those under age 18 and 18.0% of those age 65 or over.

== Education ==
The town has a lending library, the Kewanna-Union Township Public Library. Kewanna High School used to serve the town but is no longer in operation.
