= List of protected areas of Indiana =

Protected areas of Indiana include national forest lands, Army Corps of Engineers areas, state parks, state forests, state nature preserves, state wildlife management areas, and other areas.

== Federal lands ==
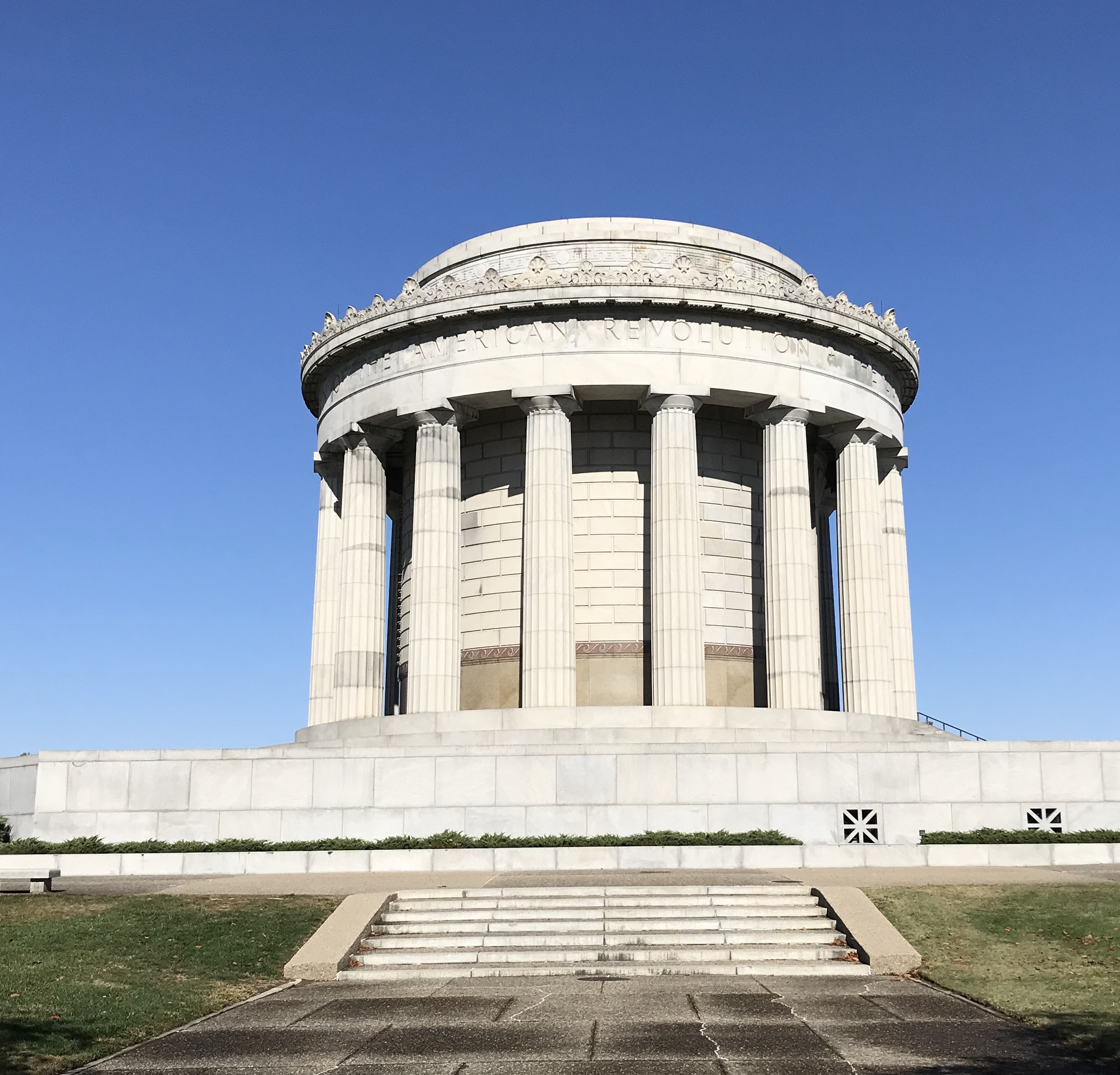
George Rogers Clark Historical Park

=== National Park Service, Department of the Interior ===
- George Rogers Clark National Historical Park
- Indiana Dunes National Park
- Lewis and Clark National Historic Trail
  - Falls of the Ohio State Park
- Lincoln Boyhood National Memorial

=== U.S. Forest Service, Department of Agriculture ===
- Hoosier National Forest
- Charles C. Deam Wilderness

=== U.S. Fish and Wildlife Service, Department of the Interior ===
- Big Oaks National Wildlife Refuge
- Muscatatuck National Wildlife Refuge
- Patoka River National Wildlife Refuge

=== Army Corps of Engineers, Department of Defense ===
- Brookville Lake Dam
- Cagles Mill Lake
- Cannelton Locks and Dam
- Cecil M Harden Lake Project (at Ferndale, Indiana)
- Falls of the Ohio National Wildlife Conservation Area
- J. Edward Roush Lake
- John T. Myers Locks and Dam
- Mississinewa Lake Dam
- Monroe Lake
- Newburgh Lock and Dam
- Salamonie Lake Dam

== State lands ==
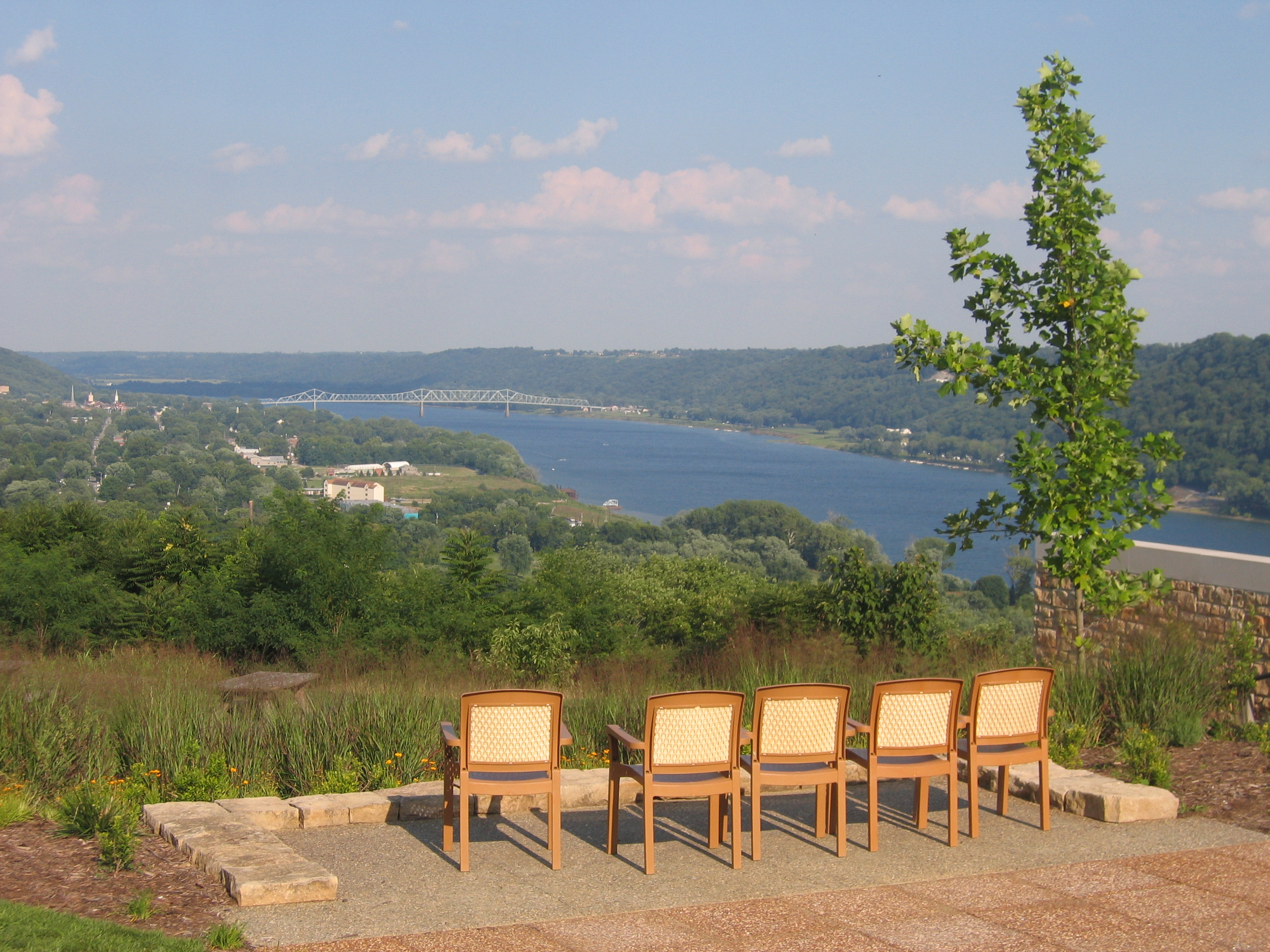
View overlooking the Ohio River from Clifty Falls State Park.

=== State parks ===
Indiana has 24 state parks maintained and operated by Indiana Department of Natural Resources (IDNR). In addition, a separate state agency operates White River State Park in Indianapolis.

=== State memorials ===
- Angel Mounds
- Corydon Historic District
- Culbertson Mansion State Historic Site
- Gene Stratton-Porter Cabin
- New Harmony Historic District
- Lanier Mansion
- Levi Coffin House
- Limberlost State Historic Site
- T. C. Steele State Historic Site
- Vincennes State Historic Site
- Whitewater Canal State Historic Site

=== State forests ===
- Clark State Forest - 25,288.8 acres (19 km^{2})
- Deam Lake State Recreation Area
- Ferdinand State Forest - 7,789.9 acres (10 km^{2})
- Frances Slocum State Forest
- Greene–Sullivan State Forest – 9,048.8 acres (1.3 km^{2}); Athens County
- Harrison–Crawford State Forest – 24,322.7 acres (5 km^{2})
- Jackson–Washington State Forest - 18,416.2 acres (38 km^{2})
- Martin State Forest - 7,863.6 acres (12 km^{2})
- Morgan–Monroe State Forest - 25,789.7 acres (17 km^{2}); Ashland County
- Mountain Tea State Forest - 1,153 acres (18 km^{2}); Perry County
- Owen–Putnam State Forest - 6,589 acres (47 km^{2})
- Pike State Forest - 4,031.5 acres (9 km^{2})
- Ravinia State Forest - 1,500 acres (38 km^{2})
- Salamonie State Forest – 955.8 acres (11 km^{2}); Meigs County
- Selmier State Forest – 350.4 acres (241 km^{2}); Scioto and Adams Counties
- Starve Hollow Recreation Area - 278 acres (2.6 km^{2})
- Yellowwood State Forest - 25,084.4 acres (65 km^{2})

=== State fish wildlife areas ===
- Atterbury Fish and Wildlife Area
- Blue Grass Fish and Wildlife Area
- Chinook Fish and Wildlife Area
- Crosley Fish and Wildlife Area
- Deer Creek Fish and Wildlife Area
- Fairbanks Landing Fish and Wildlife Area
- Glendale Fish and Wildlife Area
- Goose Pond Fish and Wildlife Area
- Hillenbrand Fish and Wildlife Area
- Hovey Lake Fish and Wildlife Area
- Jasper-Pulaski Fish and Wildlife Area
- J.E. Roush Lake Fish and Wildlife Area
- Kankakee Fish and Wildlife Area
- Kingsbury Fish and Wildlife Area
- LaSalle Fish and Wildlife Area
- Pigeon River Fish and Wildlife Area
- Splinter Ridge Fish and Wildlife Area
- Sugar Ridge Fish and Wildlife Area
- Tri-County Fish and Wildlife Area
- Wabashiki Fish and Wildlife Area
- Wilbur Wright Fish and Wildlife Area
- Willow Slough Fish and Wildlife Area
- Winamac Fish and Wildlife Area
