= List of Indiana state forests =

The following is a list of state forests in Indiana by area. The first three tie as number one, so they are listed in alphabetical order.

Rank	Name	County where main entrance is located	Area	Notes
1	Clark State Forest	Clark	24,000 acres (97.12 km^{2})	
2	Harrison–Crawford State Forest	Harrison and Crawford	24,000 acres (97.12 km^{2})	
3	Morgan–Monroe State Forest	Monroe	24,000 acres (97.12 km^{2})	
4	Yellowwood State Forest	Brown	23,326 acres (94.40 km^{2})	
5	Jackson–Washington State Forest	Washington	18,000 acres (72.84 km^{2})	
6	Greene–Sullivan State Forest	Sullivan	9,000 acres (36.42 km^{2})	
7	Ferdinand State Forest	Dubois	7,657 acres (30.99 km^{2})	
8	Martin State Forest	Martin	7,023 acres (28.42 km^{2})	
9	Pike State Forest	Pike	4,444 acres (17.98 km^{2})	
10	Ravinia State Forest	Morgan	1,500 acres (6 km^{2})	
12	Mountain Tea State Forest	Brown	1,153 acres (4.67 km^{2})	
13	Salamonie River State Forest	Wabash	850 acres (3.4 km^{2})	
14	Frances Slocum State Forest	Miami	516 acres (2.09 km^{2})	
15	Selmier State Forest	Jennings	355 acres (1.4 km^{2})	
16	Covered Bridge State Forest	Parke	300 acres (1.2 km^{2})	
18	Owen–Putnam State Forest	Putnam	91 acres (0.37 km^{2})	

== See also ==
- Indiana Department of Natural Resources
- List of Indiana state parks
- List of Indiana state lakes
- List of national forests of the United States
