= Indiana State Road 524 =

State highway in Indiana, United States

State Road 524
- SR 524 highlighted in red

Route information
- Maintained by INDOT
- Length: 3.662 mi (5.893 km)

Major junctions
- West end: US 24 near Lagro
- South end: Salamonie River State Forest

Location
- Country: United States
- State: Indiana

Highway system
- Indiana State Highway System; Interstate; US; State; Scenic
← SR 520	→ SR 545

State Road 524 (SR 524) is the designation of a state road in the northern section of the US state of Indiana that runs between U.S. Route 24 (US 24) and Salamonie River State Forest, via Lagro. SR 524 travels some of its route as an east–west and the rest as a north–south road. The highway was first designated in late 1930s or early 1940s running south out of Largo. An extension occurred during the early 2000s that added the east–west segment, when US 24 was moved to its modern route in the area.

== Route description ==
SR 524 beings at an intersection with US 24 west of Lagro. The road heads east-northeast as a two-lane highway passing through farmland, before entering the town of Lagro. SR 524 enters town and turns towards the south, before crossing a Norfolk Southern railroad tracks. South of the tracks the road passes through the main section of Lagro, concurrent with Davis Street. While in Lagro SR 524 passes by mostly residential land. The road leaves Lagro by crossing over the Wabash River and entering rural Wabash County. In Wabash County the road continues towards the south passing through farmland, before a short distance of paralleling the Salamonie River. South of the river SR 524 enters a wooded area, before SR 524 ends at the main entrances Salamonie River State Forest. The SR 524 designation ends but the roadway continues south as America Road, a county road maintained by Wabash County. In 2016, INDOT's traffic surveys showed that on average, 1,557 vehicles used the highway daily along Davis Street and 500 vehicles did so each day near the southern end, the highest and lowest counts along the highway, respectively.

== History ==
The Indiana State Highway Commission added SR 524 to the state road system, along the modern north–south segment, between 1939 and 1941. Between 1972 and 1973 the north–south segment of modern SR 524 was paved. The east–west segment became part of SR 524 between 2000 and 2001, when the four-lane divided segment of US 24 opened.

== Major intersections ==
The entire route is in Wabash County.

Location	mi	km	Destinations	Notes
Lagro	0.000	0.000	US 24 – Wabash, Huntington	
Lagro Township	3.662	5.893	Salamonie River State Forest	Roadway continues south as America Road
1.000 mi = 1.609 km; 1.000 km = 0.621 mi
