= America, Indiana =

- Unincorporated community
- Location within Indiana Location within the United States
- Coordinates: 40°40′45″N 85°42′07″W
- Country: United States
- State: Indiana
- County: Wabash
- Township: Liberty
- Elevation: 827 ft (252 m)
- Time zone: UTC-5 (Eastern (EST))
  - Summer (DST): UTC-4 (EDT)
- ZIP code: 46940
- GNIS feature ID: 448390

America is an unincorporated community in Liberty Township, Wabash County, in the U.S. state of Indiana.

It is located just east of the nearby town of La Fontaine.

== History ==
A post office was established at America in 1837, and remained in operation until it was discontinued in 1881.
