= Ijamsville =

Ijamsville may refer to:

- Ijamsville, Indiana, an unincorporated town in Pleasant Township, Wabash County, Indiana, United States
- Ijamsville, Maryland, an unincorporated area in Frederick County, Maryland, United States
