= Pike State Forest =

Pike State Forest may refer to:

- Pike State Forest (Indiana)
- Pike State Forest (Ohio)
