= Speicherville, Indiana =

- Unincorporated community
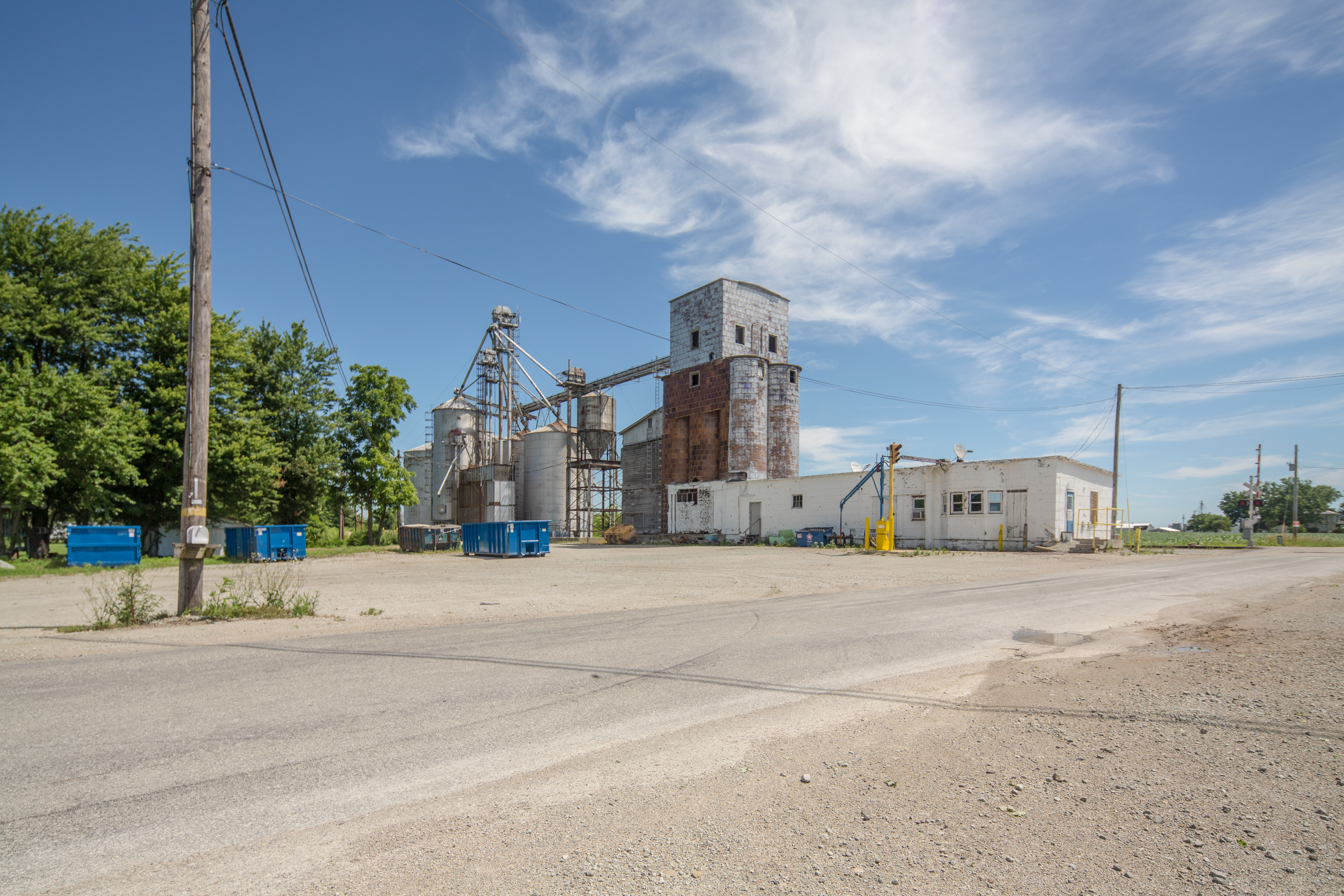

- Location within Indiana Location within the United States
- Coordinates: 40°51′16″N 85°47′30″W
- Country: United States
- State: Indiana
- County: Wabash
- Township: Lagro
- Elevation: 807 ft (246 m)
- Time zone: UTC-5 (Eastern (EST))
  - Summer (DST): UTC-4 (EDT)
- ZIP code: 46992
- GNIS feature ID: 443932

Speicherville is an unincorporated community in Lagro Township, Wabash County, in the U.S. state of Indiana.

It is located on Indiana State Road 13 between Wabash and Urbana.

== History ==
Speicherville was platted in 1881 by Christian W. Speicher, and named for him. An old variant name of the community was called Spiker.

A post office was established under the name Spiker in 1881, and remained in operation until it was discontinued in 1913.

Christian W. Speicher was a farmer and carpenter from Lagro and was originally from Holmes County, Ohio. On January 29, 1858, Christian married Catherine Cosly; a native from Carrol County, Indiana.

In 1866, Christian purchased a plot of land that adjoined his father's land that consisted of 280 acres. He had multiple well cultivated fields and barns that allowed the appearance of an already established homestead that were prominent in the area. Along this tract of land, the Cincinnati, Wabash & Michigan Railroad Company began construction of a new station that would later be coined "Spikerville".

With this new station, Christian then began construction of a general store. Following the general store, other trades began to emerge within the town surrounding the original farm that Christian had built including a blacksmith and, in 1881, the post office that platted the town.

Christian W. Speicher died on August 19, 1900, and was buried in Urbana, Wabash County, Indiana.
