= Rich Valley =

Rich Valley or Richvalley may refer to some places in Canada and the United States:

- Rich Valley, Alberta, Canada, a hamlet
- Richvalley, Indiana, US, an unincorporated community
- Rich Valley, Minnesota, US, a former community within present-day Rosemount
- Rich Valley, Virginia, US, a rural area in Smyth County
- Rich Valley Township, McLeod County, Minnesota, US
