= Mount Vernon, Wabash County, Indiana =

Mount Vernon
- Unincorporated community
- Location within Indiana Location within the United States
- Coordinates: 40°40′10″N 85°49′27″W
- Country: United States
- State: Indiana
- County: Wabash
- Township: Waltz
- Elevation: 814 ft (248 m)
- Time zone: UTC-5 (Eastern (EST))
  - Summer (DST): UTC-4 (EDT)
- ZIP code: 46940
- GNIS feature ID: 439717

Mount Vernon is an unincorporated community situated in Waltz Township, Wabash County, in the U.S. state of Indiana.

It is located next to the town of Somerset.
