= Treaty, Indiana =

- Unincorporated community
- Location within Indiana Location within the United States
- Coordinates: 40°43′28″N 85°46′57″W
- Country: United States
- State: Indiana
- County: Wabash
- Township: Liberty
- Elevation: 807 ft (246 m)
- Time zone: UTC-5 (Eastern (EST))
  - Summer (DST): UTC-4 (EDT)
- ZIP code: 46992
- GNIS feature ID: 444864

Treaty is an unincorporated community in Liberty Township, Wabash County, in the U.S. state of Indiana.

== History ==
Treaty was founded in the mid-1870s, and was named after the nearby Treaty Creek. A post office was established at Treaty in 1874, and remained in operation until it was discontinued in 1935.

== Geography ==
Treaty is located on Indiana State Road 15 between Wabash and La Fontaine.
