= Rose Hill, Indiana =

Extinct Indiana community

Coordinates: 41.04338°N 85.8443°W

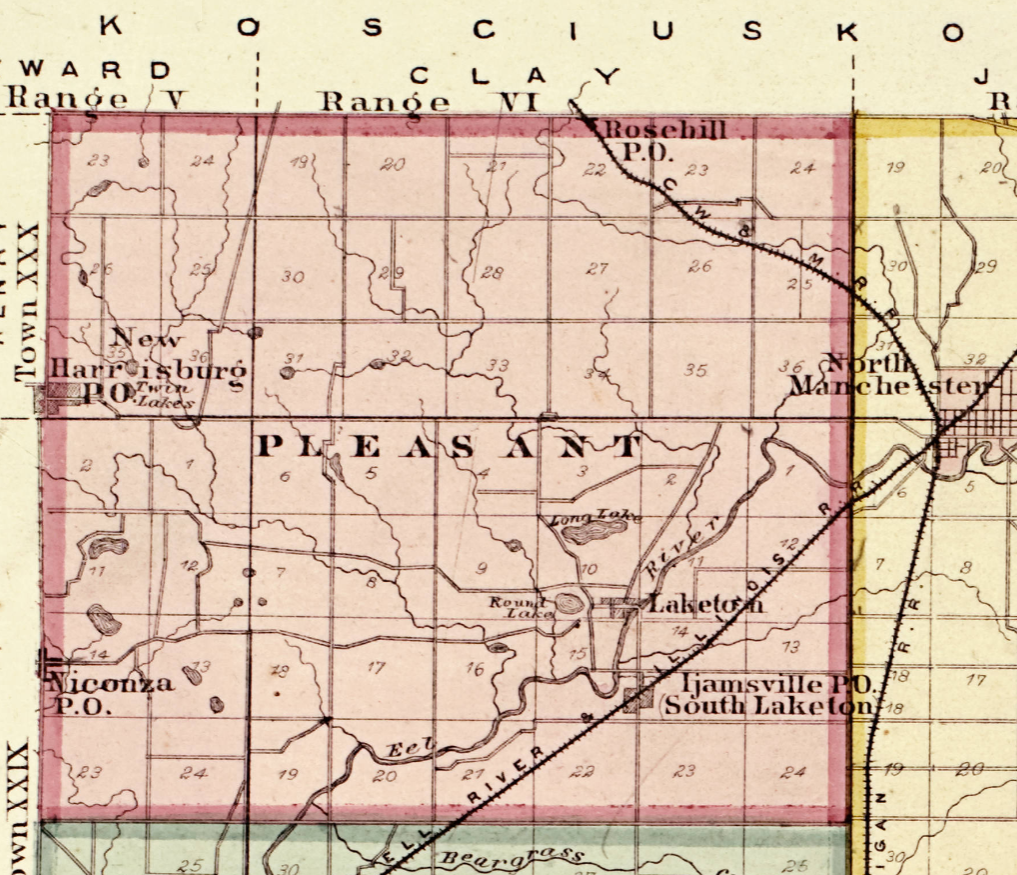
Detail of 1875 map of Wabash County, Indiana, showing the location of the Rose Hill Post Office on the northern border of Pleasant Township, adjacent to Kosciusko County, Indiana, and along the Cincinnati, Wabash and Michigan Rail Road (C. W. & M. R. R.). Used by permission of the Indiana Historical Society.

Rose Hill (also called Rosehill) was an unincorporated community along a railroad at the border between Kosciusko County, Indiana, and Wabash County, Indiana. The extinct community's church and cemetery, in Wabash County, remain. The Rose Hill Post Office was established by 1870. United States Post Office Department Official Postal Guides through 1881 listed the Rose Hill Post Office as being in Kosciusko County, and afterwards in Wabash County. The Rose Hill Post Office was discontinued by about 1906.
