= Noble Township, Wabash County, Indiana =

Noble Township
- Township
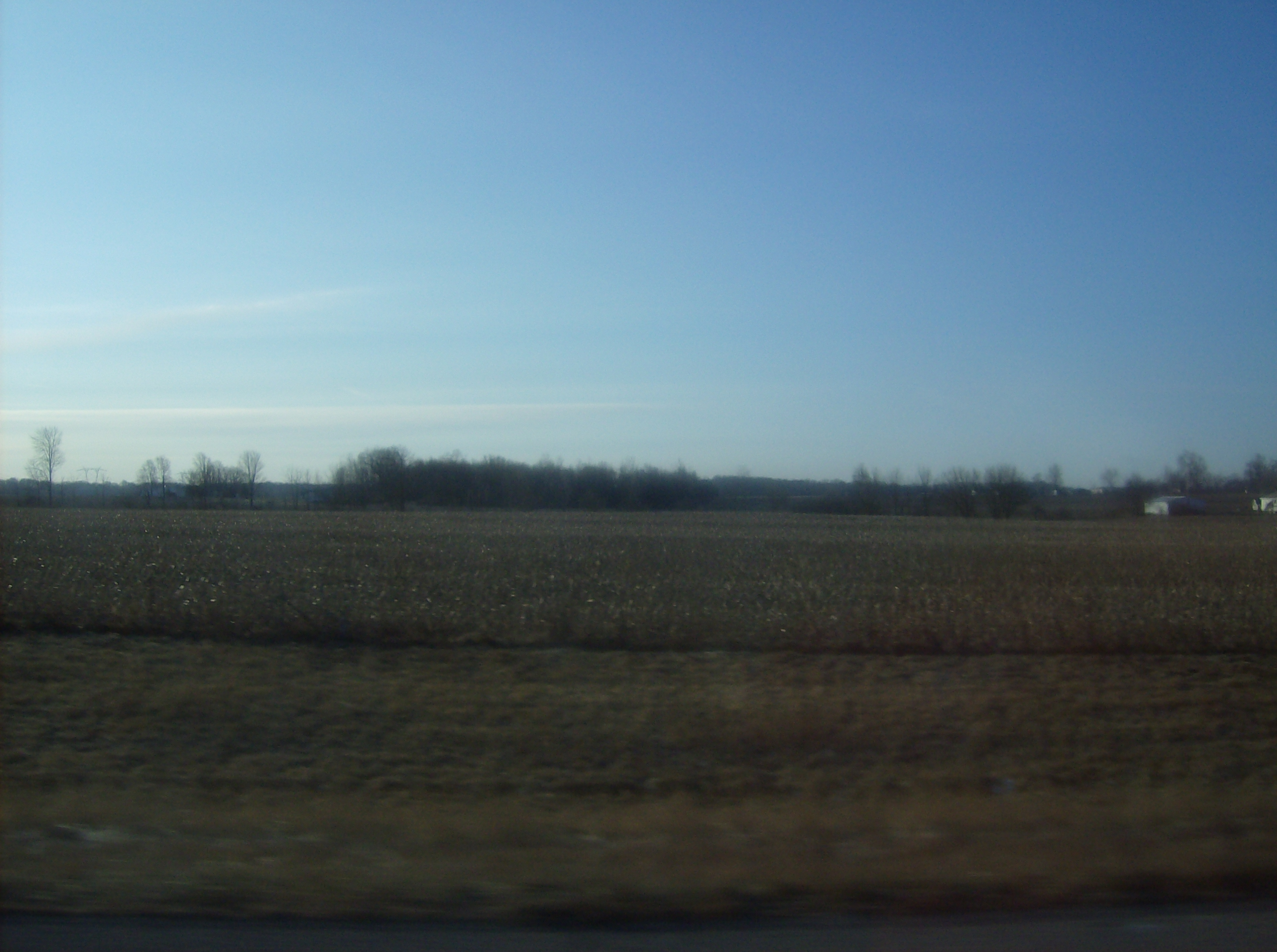
- Countryside in Noble Township, northeast of Wabash

- Location in Wabash County
- Coordinates: 40°47′54″N 85°51′08″W
- Country: United States
- State: Indiana
- County: Wabash

Government
  - Type: Indiana township

Area
  - Total: 82.39 sq mi (213.4 km^{2})
  - Land: 81.9 sq mi (212 km^{2})
  - Water: 0.49 sq mi (1.3 km^{2}) 0.59%
- Elevation: 705 ft (215 m)

Population (2020)
  - Total: 13,922
  - Density: 170/sq mi (65.6/km^{2})
- ZIP codes: 46970, 46992
- GNIS feature ID: 453675

Noble Township is one of seven townships in Wabash County, Indiana, United States. As of the 2020 census, its population was 13,922 (down from 14,230 at 2010) and it contained 6,511 housing units.

== History ==
The Teague Barn Wabash Importing Company Farm Stable was listed on the National Register of Historic Places in 2002.

== Geography ==
According to the 2010 census, the township has a total area of 82.39 square miles (213.4 km^{2}), of which 81.9 square miles (212 km^{2}) (or 99.41%) is land and 0.49 square miles (1.3 km^{2}) (or 0.59%) is water.

=== Cities, towns, villages ===
- Wabash

=== Unincorporated towns ===
- Richvalley at 40.785043°N 85.920266°W

(This list is based on USGS data and may include former settlements.)

=== Adjacent townships ===
- Paw Paw Township (north)
- Lagro Township (east)
- Liberty Township (southeast)
- Waltz Township (south)
- Butler Township, Miami County (southwest)
- Erie Township, Miami County (west)
- Richland Township, Miami County (northwest)

=== Cemeteries ===
The township contains these eight cemeteries: Friends, Hebrew, Huff, Martin Luther, Matlock, Memorial Lawns, Richvalley and Wallace.

=== Airports and landing strips ===
- Wabash Municipal Airport

== School districts ==
- Metropolitan School District of Wabash County Schools
- Wabash City Schools

== Political districts ==
- Indiana's 5th congressional district
- State House District 22
- State Senate District 17
