= LaFontaine Historic District =

Historic district in Indiana, United States

- U.S. National Register of Historic Places
- U.S. Historic district
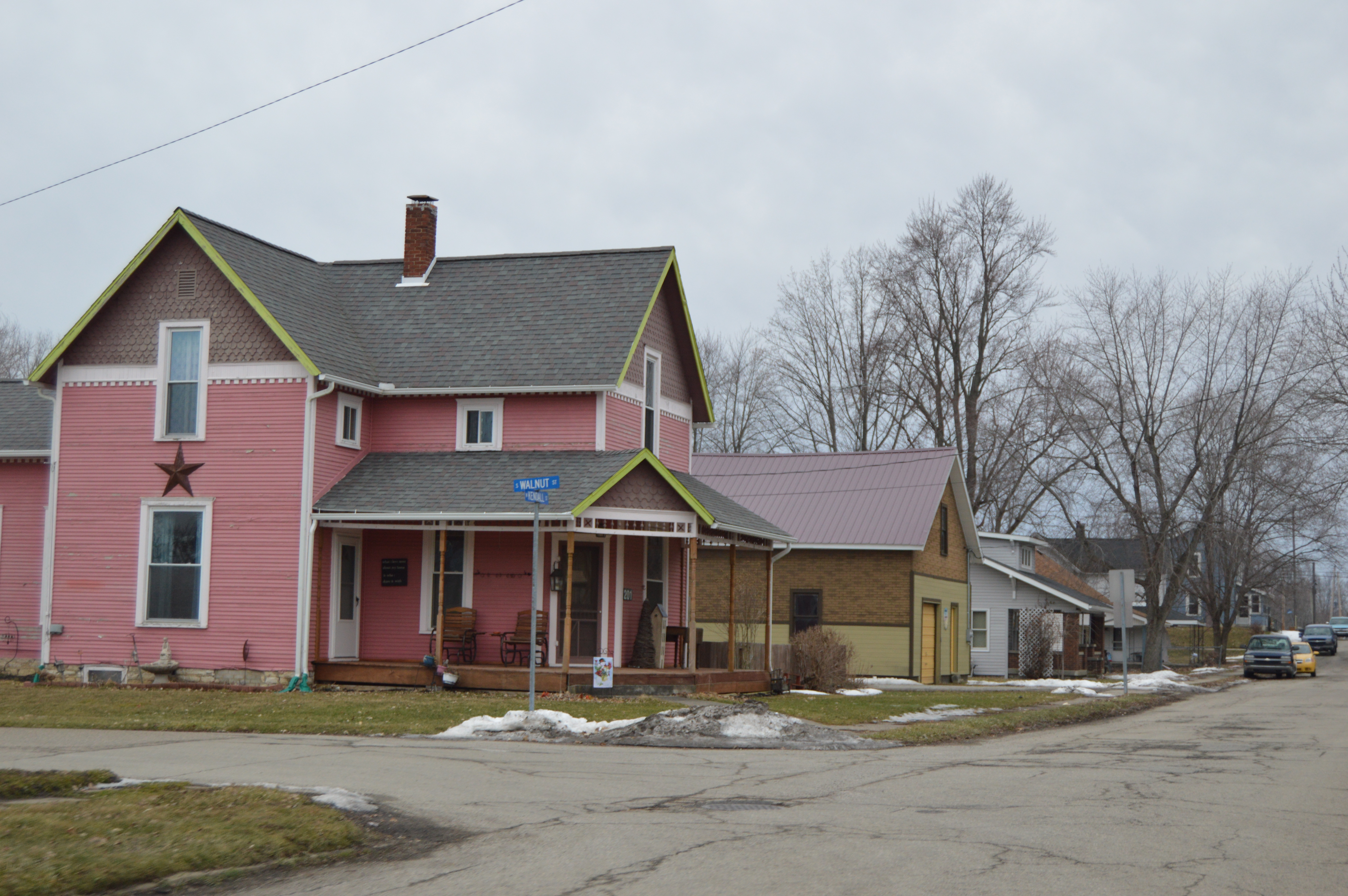
- Kendall at Walnut, La Fontaine, March 2015

- Location within Indiana Location within the United States
- Location: Roughly Kendall and Branson between Walnut and Gruell Sts., La Fontaine, Indiana
- Coordinates: 40°40′27″N 85°43′21″W
- Area: 12 acres (4.9 ha)
- Architectural style: Gothic, Italianate, Queen Anne, Romanesque Revival, Classical Revival, Bungalow/Craftsman
- NRHP reference No.: 14000809
- Added to NRHP: September 30, 2014

LaFontaine Historic District is a national historic district located at La Fontaine, Indiana. It encompasses 56 contributing buildings and four contributing structures in the central business district and surrounding residential sections of La Fontaine. It developed between about 1848 and 1930, and includes representative examples of Gothic Revival, Italianate, Queen Anne, Romanesque Revival, Classical Revival, and Bungalow / American Craftsman style architecture.

Notable buildings include the Matthews Service Station (c. 1915), John Finkenbiner Blacksmith Shop (c. 1885), Criswell House/Masonic Lodge (c. 1890), LaFontaine Methodist Church (1902), O. W. Clark Grocery (c. 1910), I.O.O.F. Hall (1905), Parker Building (1884), Parker House (1848, c. 1910), Parker Carriage House (c. 1850), Original Parker Store (c. 1850, c. 1885), Farmers State Bank (1919), and Knights of Pythias Lodge No. 211/LaFontaine National Bank (1893, 1918).

It was listed on the National Register of Historic Places in 2014.
