= Disko, Indiana =

- Unincorporated community
- Location within Indiana Location within the United States
- Coordinates: 41°00′08″N 85°56′40″W
- Country: United States
- State: Indiana
- County: Fulton, Wabash
- Township: Henry, Pleasant
- Elevation: 860 ft (260 m)
- Time zone: UTC-5 (Eastern (EST))
  - Summer (DST): UTC-4 (EDT)
- ZIP code: 46982
- FIPS code: 18-18226
- GNIS feature ID: 433567

Disko is an unincorporated community in Fulton and Wabash counties, in the U.S. state of Indiana.

== History ==
Disko was originally known as New Harrisburg, and under the latter name was laid out in 1856.

A post office was established under the name New Harrisburg in 1871, was renamed Disko in 1883, and remained in operation until it was discontinued in 1967.
