= Salamonie Lake Dam =

Dam and reservoir in Wabash County, Indiana, U.S.

Salamonie Dam
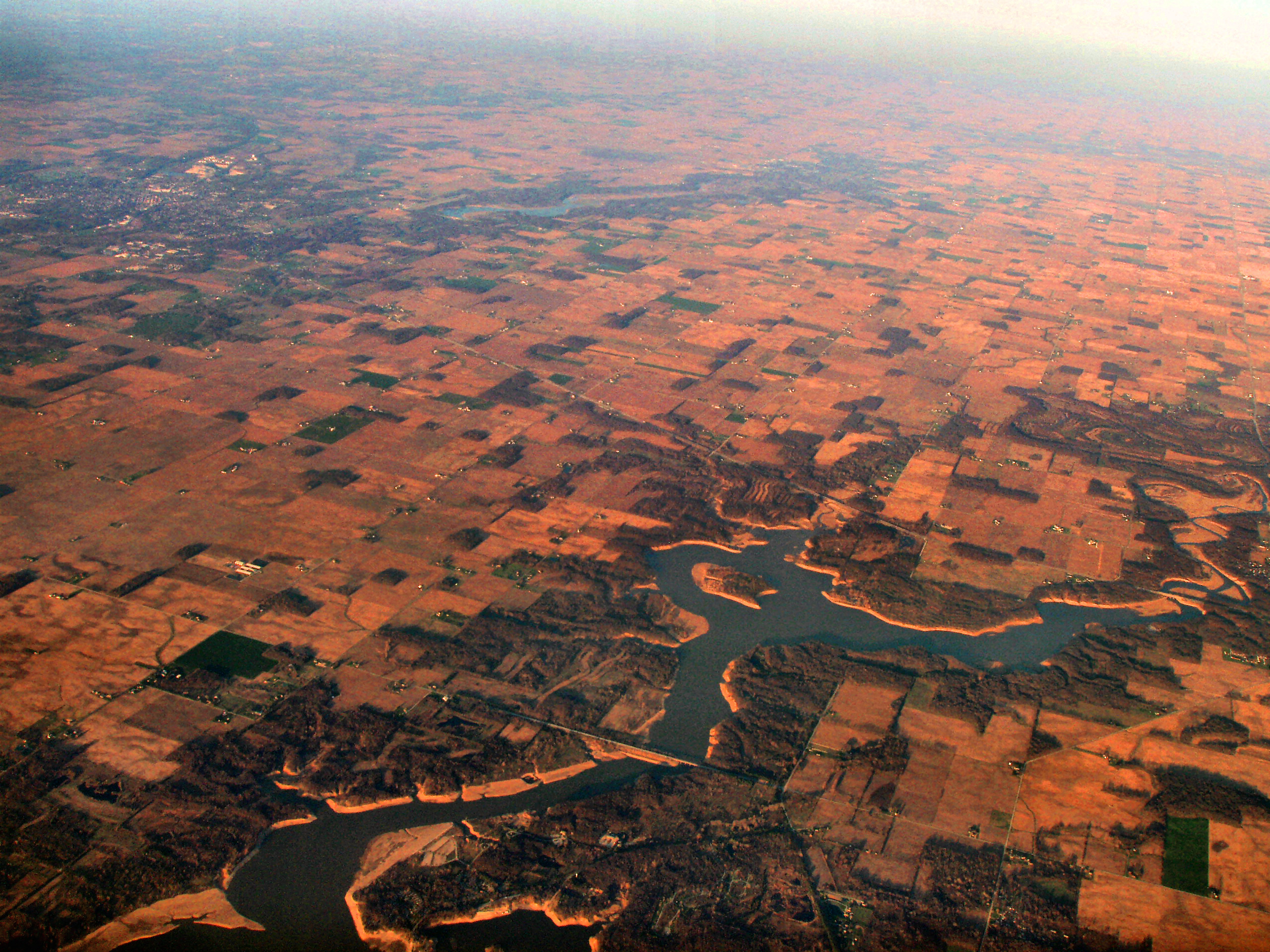
- Interactive map of Salamonie Dam
- Country: United States
- Location: Wabash County, Indiana
- Coordinates: 40°48′25″N 85°40′45″W
- Built by: United States Army Corps of Engineers
- Owner: United States Army Corps of Engineers
- Operators: United States Army Corps of Engineers, Indiana Department of Natural Resources

Dam and spillways
- Impounds: Salamonie River
- Height: 133 ft (41 m)
- Length: 6,100 ft (1,900 m)

Reservoir
- Total capacity: 263,600 acre⋅ft (325,100,000 m^{3})
- Surface area: 4.5 sq mi (12 km^{2})
- Normal elevation: 751 ft (229 m)

Salamonie Lake
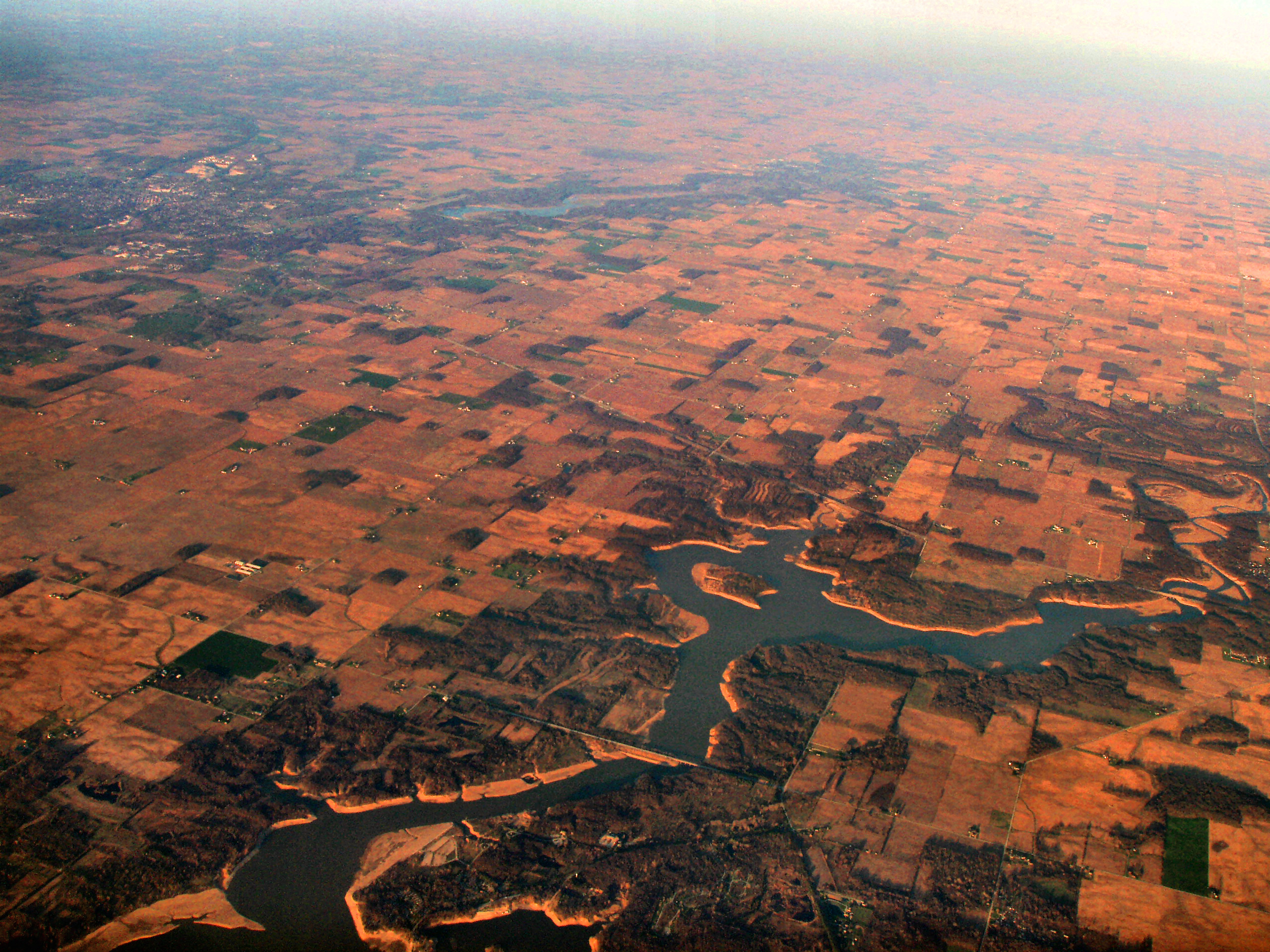
- Salmonie Lake in the foreground, with the town of Huntington, Indiana to the left background

- Location within Indiana
- Location: Wabash County, Indiana
- Coordinates: 40°46′27″N 85°36′23″W
- Type: reservoir
- Surface area: 4.5 sq mi (12 km^{2})
- Water volume: 263,600 acre⋅ft (325,100,000 m^{3})
- Surface elevation: 751 ft (229 m)

Salamonie Dam (National ID # IN03005) is a dam in Wabash County, Indiana.

The earthen and rockfill dam was constructed in 1966 by the United States Army Corps of Engineers, with a height of 133 feet (41 m) and 6,100 feet (1,900 m) long at its crest. It impounds the Salamonie River for flood control and storm water management, is owned by the Corps of Engineers, and is operated by the Corps and the Indiana Department of Natural Resources.

The reservoir it creates, Salamonie Lake, has a normal water surface of 4.5 square miles (12 km^{2}) and a maximum capacity of 263,600 acre-feet (325,100,000 m^{3}); the total project encompasses 12,000 acres (49 km^{2}) of land and water. Recreation includes boating, swimming, and fishing for white crappie, channel catfish, white bass, and walleye. The state also operates the adjacent Salamonie River State Forest, Mt. Hope State Recreation Area, Dora New Holland State Recreation Area, Lost Bridge State Recreation Area, and Mt. Etna State Recreation Area.
