= Hominy Ridge Shelter House =

- U.S. National Register of Historic Places
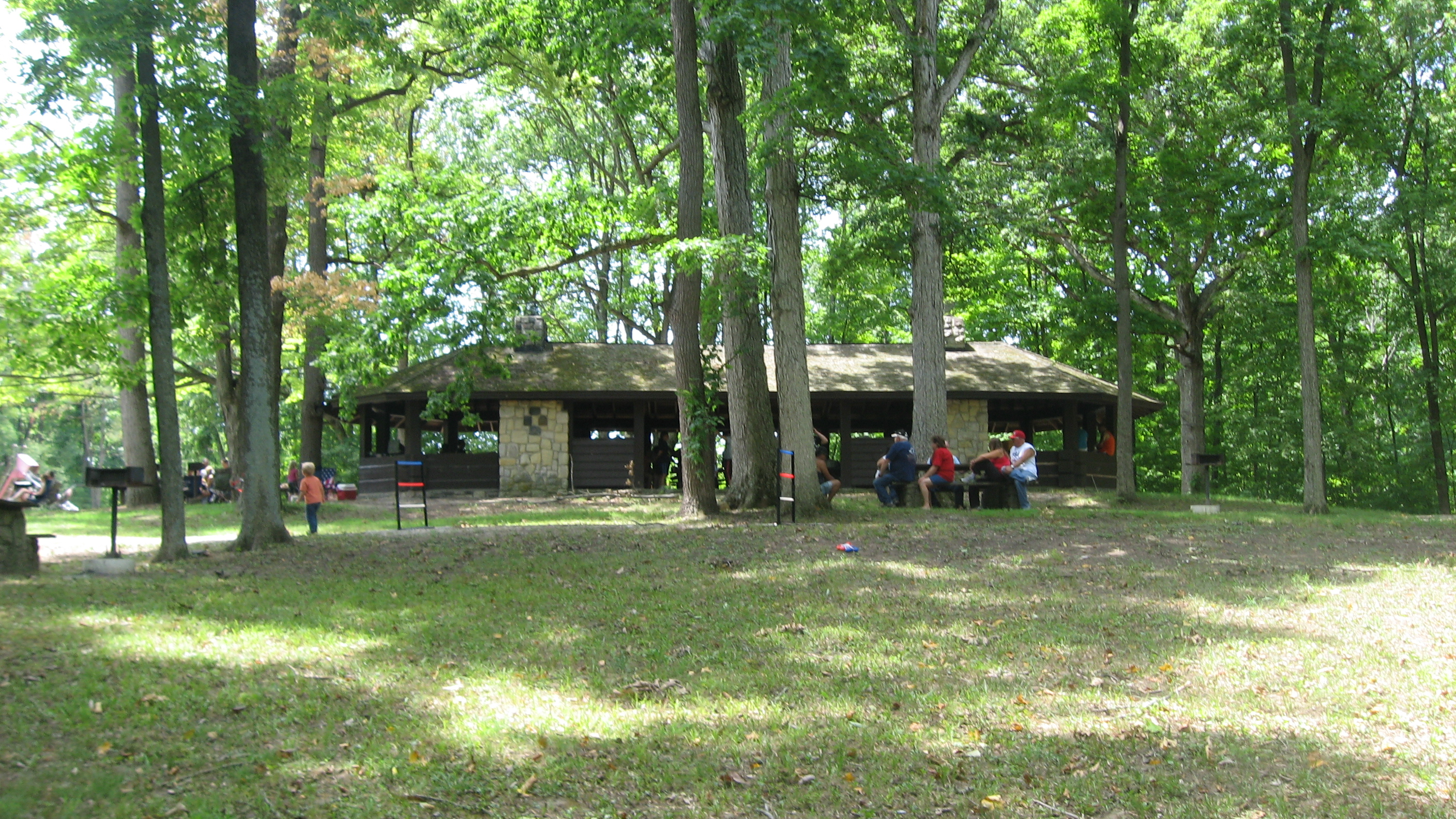
- Hominy Ridge Shelter House, July 2012

- Location within Indiana Location within the United States
- Location: On the S bank of the Salamonie R., N of Hominy Ridge Lake, southeast of Lagro in the Salamonie River State Forest, Lagro Township, Wabash County, Indiana
- Coordinates: 40°48′34″N 85°40′59″W
- Area: 4 acres (1.6 ha)
- Built: 1937
- Built by: CCC
- Architectural style: Park rustic style
- NRHP reference No.: 94001122
- Added to NRHP: September 23, 1994

Hominy Ridge Shelter House is a historic park picnic shelter complex located in the Salamonie River State Forest in Lagro Township, Wabash County, Indiana. The shelterhouse was built in 1937 by the Civilian Conservation Corps, and is a rectangular Rustic style timber and stone structure with a five sided porch on each end. Associated with the shelter are 13 stone and timber picnic tables and the remains of a stone wall and an outhouse.

It was listed on the National Register of Historic Places in 1994.

== See also ==
- National Register of Historic Places listings in Wabash County, Indiana
