= Teague Barn Wabash Importing Company Farm Stable =

- U.S. National Register of Historic Places
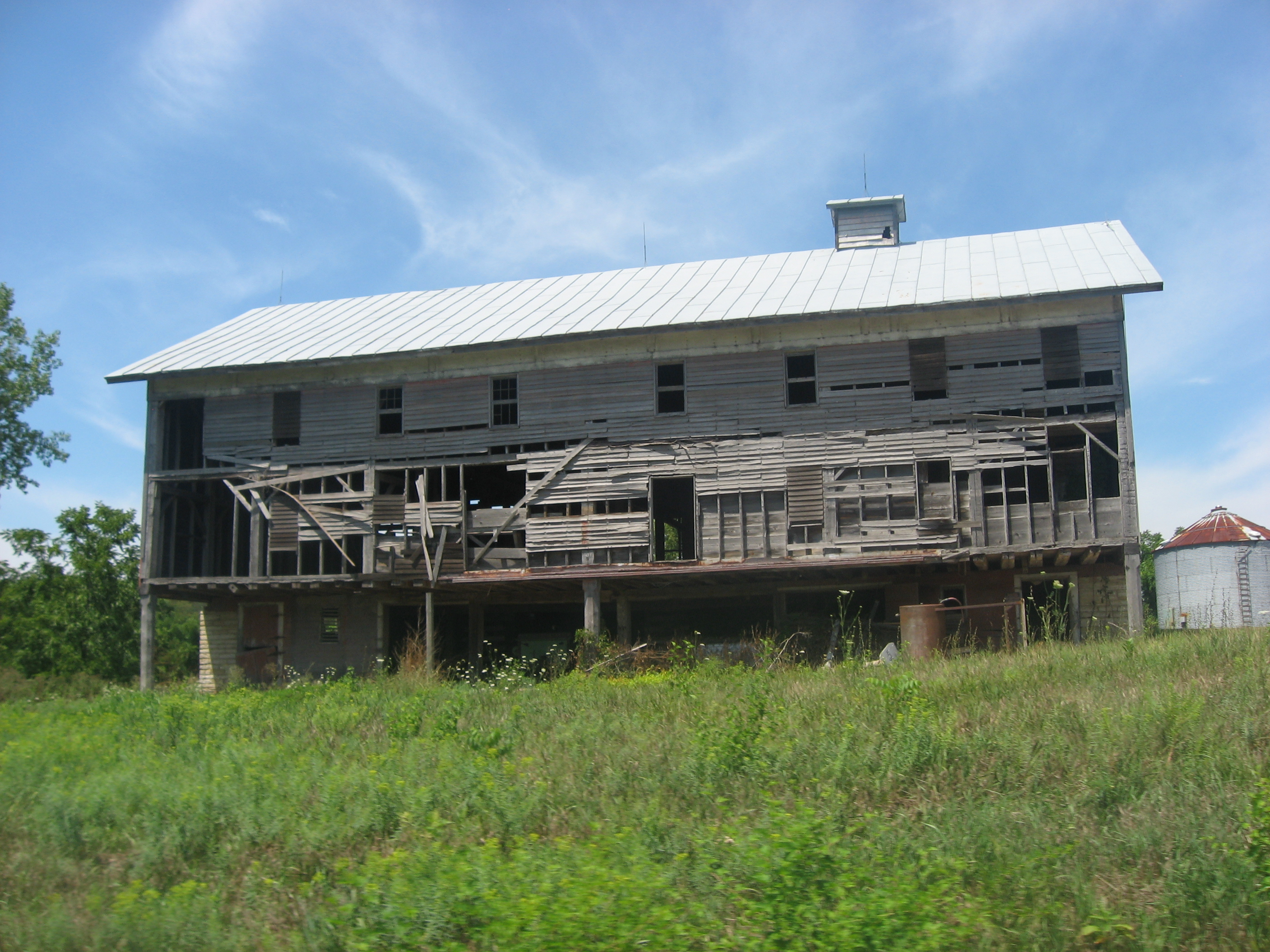
- Teague Barn Wabash Importing Company Farm Stable, July 2012

- Location within Indiana Location within the United States
- Location: 4568 W. Mill Creek Pike, southwest of Wabash in Noble Township, Wabash County, Indiana
- Coordinates: 40°46′31″N 85°52′44″W
- Area: 2 acres (0.81 ha)
- Built: 1861
- Built by: Hubbard, Nathan Dixon
- Architectural style: Bank Barn
- NRHP reference No.: 02000691
- Added to NRHP: June 27, 2002

Teague Barn Wabash Importing Company Farm Stable, also known as the Miller Barn, is a historic bank barn located in Noble Township, Wabash County, Indiana. Its original section was built in 1861, and is a three-story, post-and-beam frame barn on a limestone foundation. It measures 40 by 80 feet (12 by 24 m) and features a paneled frieze and soffit, sunburst gable vent, and chamfered support posts.

It was listed on the National Register of Historic Places in 2002.
