= Liberty Township, Wabash County, Indiana =

Liberty Township
- Township
- Location in Wabash County
- Coordinates: 40°41′44″N 85°43′03″W
- Country: United States
- State: Indiana
- County: Wabash

Government
  - Type: Indiana township

Area
  - Total: 47.21 sq mi (122.3 km^{2})
  - Land: 46.53 sq mi (120.5 km^{2})
  - Water: 0.68 sq mi (1.8 km^{2}) 1.44%
- Elevation: 869 ft (265 m)

Population (2020)
  - Total: 2,191
  - Density: 47.09/sq mi (18.18/km^{2})
- ZIP codes: 46940, 46992
- GNIS feature ID: 453564

Liberty Township is one of seven townships in Wabash County, Indiana, United States. As of the 2020 census, its population was 2,191 (down from 2,365 at 2010) and it contained 979 housing units.

== Geography ==
According to the 2010 census, the township has a total area of 47.21 square miles (122.3 km^{2}), of which 46.53 square miles (120.5 km^{2}) (or 98.56%) is land and 0.68 square miles (1.8 km^{2}) (or 1.44%) is water.

=== Cities, towns, villages ===
- La Fontaine

=== Unincorporated towns ===
- America at 40.679209°N 85.701925°W
- Treaty at 40.724487°N 85.782483°W

(This list is based on USGS data and may include former settlements.)

=== Adjacent townships ===
- Lagro Township (north)
- Polk Township, Huntington County (northeast)
- Wayne Township, Huntington County (east)
- Washington Township, Grant County (southeast)
- Pleasant Township, Grant County (south)
- Richland Township, Grant County (southwest)
- Waltz Township (west)
- Noble Township (northwest)

=== Cemeteries ===
The township contains these seven cemeteries: America, Gardner, Hale, Harper, Rennaker, Stone and Waggoner.

=== Lakes ===
- Mississinewa Lake

== School districts ==
- Metropolitan School District of Wabash County Schools

== Political districts ==
- Indiana's 5th congressional district
- State House District 22
- State Senate District 17
