= Hopewell Methodist Episcopal Church and Cemetery =

Historic site in Wabash County, Indiana, US

- U.S. National Register of Historic Places
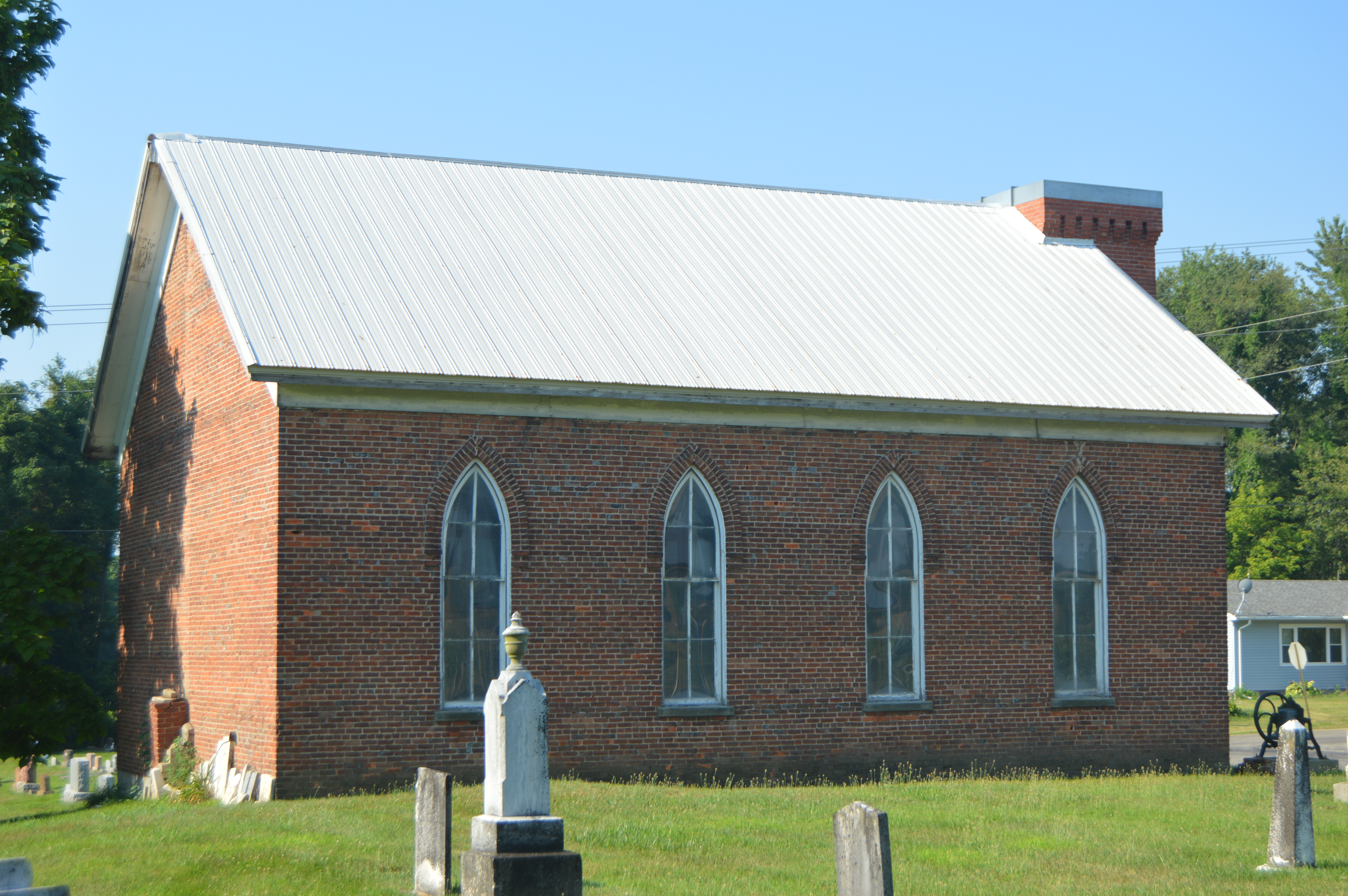
- Northern side and rear of the church

- Location within Indiana Location within the United States
- Location: 5031 E300N, Lagro Township, Wabash County, Indiana
- Coordinates: 40°52′12″N 85°41′57″W
- Area: 3.75 acres (1.52 ha)
- Built: 1849, 1872
- Architectural style: Gothic Revival
- NRHP reference No.: 15000600
- Added to NRHP: September 14, 2015

Hopewell Methodist Episcopal Church and Cemetery is a historic Methodist Episcopal church and cemetery located in Lagro Township, Wabash County, Indiana, US. It was built in 1872 and is a one-room Gothic Revival style brick church. It has a front gable roof and features a bell tower and pointed arched windows. Also on the property is the contributing cemetery, which accepted its first burial in 1849, and the church's 19th century bell.

It was listed on the National Register of Historic Places in 2015.
