= Lincolnville, Indiana =

- Unincorporated community
- Location within Indiana Location within the United States
- Coordinates: 40°45′16″N 85°40′40″W
- Country: United States
- State: Indiana
- County: Wabash
- Township: Lagro
- Elevation: 827 ft (252 m)
- Time zone: UTC-5 (Eastern (EST))
  - Summer (DST): UTC-4 (EDT)
- ZIP code: 46992
- FIPS code: 18-44064
- GNIS feature ID: 437948

Lincolnville is an unincorporated community in Lagro Township, Wabash County, in the U.S. state of Indiana.

== History ==
A post office was established in Lincolnville in 1865. It remained in operation until it was discontinued in 1907.
