= Pleasant Township, Wabash County, Indiana =

Pleasant Township
- Township
- Location in Wabash County
- Coordinates: 40°59′41″N 85°51′46″W
- Country: United States
- State: Indiana
- County: Wabash

Government
  - Type: Indiana township

Area
  - Total: 54.98 sq mi (142.4 km^{2})
  - Land: 54.29 sq mi (140.6 km^{2})
  - Water: 0.69 sq mi (1.8 km^{2}) 1.26%
- Elevation: 801 ft (244 m)

Population (2020)
  - Total: 2,388
  - Density: 43.99/sq mi (16.98/km^{2})
- ZIP codes: 46943, 46962, 46974, 46982
- GNIS feature ID: 453751

Pleasant Township is one of seven townships in Wabash County, Indiana, United States. As of the 2020 census, its population was 2,388 (down from 2,412 at 2010) and it contained 1,000 housing units.

== Geography ==
According to the 2010 census, the township has a total area of 54.98 square miles (142.4 km^{2}), of which 54.29 square miles (140.6 km^{2}) (or 98.74%) is land and 0.69 square miles (1.8 km^{2}) (or 1.26%) is water.

=== Unincorporated towns ===
- Disko at 41.002266°N 85.944436°W
- Ijamsville at 40.959766°N 85.832765°W
- Laketon at 40.974211°N 85.835821°W

(This list is based on USGS data and may include former settlements.)

=== Adjacent townships ===
- Lake Township, Kosciusko County (north)
- Jackson Township, Kosciusko County (northeast)
- Chester Township (east)
- Paw Paw Township (south)
- Henry Township, Fulton County (west)
- Perry Township, Miami County (west)
- Seward Township, Kosciusko County (northwest)

=== Cemeteries ===
The township contains these three cemeteries: Laketon, Pleasant Hill and Shiloh.

=== Lakes ===
- Brown Lake
- Long Lake
- Lotz Lake
- Lukens Lake
- Mc Calley Lake
- Mud Lake
- Round Lake

== School districts ==
- Manchester Community Schools

== Political districts ==
- Indiana's 5th congressional district
- State House District 22
- State Senate District 18
