= Waltz Township, Wabash County, Indiana =

Waltz Township
- Township
- Location in Wabash County
- Coordinates: 40°41′40″N 85°51′22″W
- Country: United States
- State: Indiana
- County: Wabash

Government
  - Type: Indiana township

Area
  - Total: 47.34 sq mi (122.6 km^{2})
  - Land: 43.19 sq mi (111.9 km^{2})
  - Water: 4.15 sq mi (10.7 km^{2}) 8.77%
- Elevation: 801 ft (244 m)

Population (2020)
  - Total: 1,199
  - Density: 27.76/sq mi (10.72/km^{2})
- ZIP codes: 46911, 46919, 46940, 46992
- GNIS feature ID: 453972

Waltz Township is one of seven townships in Wabash County, Indiana, United States. As of the 2020 census, its population was 1,199 (down from 1,287 at 2010) and it contained 568 housing units.

== Geography ==
According to the 2010 census, the township has a total area of 47.34 square miles (122.6 km^{2}), of which 43.19 square miles (111.9 km^{2}) (or 91.23%) is land and 4.15 square miles (10.7 km^{2}) (or 8.77%) is water.

=== Unincorporated towns ===
- Mount Vernon at 40.669486°N 85.824151°W
- Somerset at 40.669208°N 85.828318°W

(This list is based on USGS data and may include former settlements.)

=== Adjacent townships ===
- Noble Township (north)
- Liberty Township (east)
- Pleasant Township, Grant County (southeast)
- Richland Township, Grant County (southeast)
- Harrison Township, Miami County (southwest)
- Jackson Township, Miami County (southwest)
- Butler Township, Miami County (west)

=== Cemeteries ===
The township contains these four cemeteries: Mississinewa Memorial, Mount Pleasant, North Union and Slocum.

== School districts ==
- Metropolitan School District of Wabash County Schools

== Political districts ==
- Indiana's 5th congressional district
- State House District 22
- State Senate District 17
