= Laketon, Indiana =

- Census-designated place
- Location of Laketon in Wabash County, Indiana.
- Coordinates: 40°58′50″N 85°50′22″W
- Country: United States
- State: Indiana
- County: Wabash
- Township: Pleasant

Area
  - Total: 1.22 sq mi (3.15 km^{2})
  - Land: 1.05 sq mi (2.73 km^{2})
  - Water: 0.16 sq mi (0.42 km^{2})
- Elevation: 758 ft (231 m)

Population (2020)
  - Total: 606
  - Density: 574.9/sq mi (221.97/km^{2})
- Time zone: UTC-5 (Eastern (EST))
  - Summer (DST): UTC-4 (EDT)
- ZIP code: 46943
- FIPS code: 18-41562
- GNIS feature ID: 2629856

Laketon is an unincorporated census-designated place in Pleasant Township, Wabash County, in the U.S. state of Indiana. As of the 2020 census, Laketon had a population of 606.

== History ==
Laketon was laid out in 1836. A post office was established at Laketon in 1838, and remained in operation until it was discontinued in 2010.

== Demographics ==
Historical population
Census	Pop.	Note	%±
2020	606		—
U.S. Decennial Census
