= Lagro Township, Wabash County, Indiana =

Lagro Township
- Township
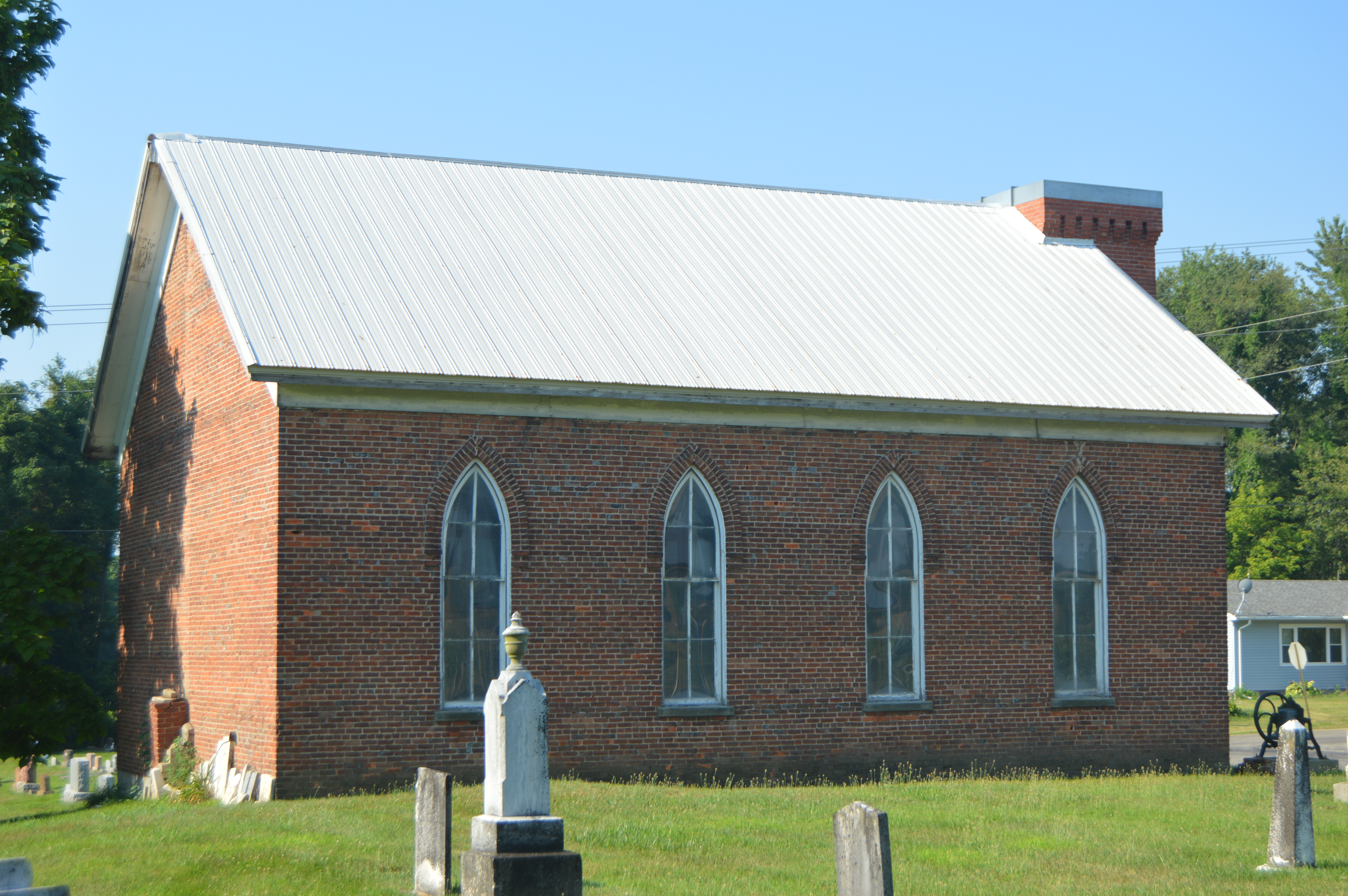
- Hopewell Methodist Church

- Location in Wabash County
- Coordinates: 40°49′50″N 85°42′29″W
- Country: United States
- State: Indiana
- County: Wabash

Government
  - Type: Indiana township

Area
  - Total: 83.33 sq mi (215.8 km^{2})
  - Land: 81.24 sq mi (210.4 km^{2})
  - Water: 2.09 sq mi (5.4 km^{2}) 2.51%
- Elevation: 669 ft (204 m)

Population (2020)
  - Total: 2,733
  - Density: 33.64/sq mi (12.99/km^{2})
- ZIP codes: 46702, 46941, 46990, 46992
- GNIS feature ID: 453534
- Website: lagrotownship.in.gov

Lagro Township is one of seven townships in Wabash County, Indiana, United States. As of the 2020 census, its population was 2,733 (down from 2,894 at 2010) and it contained 1,194 housing units.

== History ==
The Hominy Ridge Shelter House and Hopewell Methodist Episcopal Church and Cemetery are listed on the National Register of Historic Places.

== Geography ==
According to the 2010 census, the township has a total area of 83.33 square miles (215.8 km^{2}), of which 81.24 square miles (210.4 km^{2}) (or 97.49%) is land and 2.09 square miles (5.4 km^{2}) (or 2.51%) is water.

=== Cities, towns, villages ===
- Lagro

=== Unincorporated towns ===
- Lincolnville at 40.754488°N 85.677758°W
- Speicherville at 40.854488°N 85.791652°W

(This list is based on USGS data and may include former settlements.)

=== Adjacent townships ===
- Chester Township (north)
- Warren Township, Huntington County (northeast)
- Dallas Township, Huntington County (east)
- Polk Township, Huntington County (southeast)
- Wayne Township, Huntington County (southeast)
- Liberty Township (south)
- Noble Township (west)
- Paw Paw Township (northwest)

=== Cemeteries ===
The township contains these seven cemeteries: Center Grove, Foster, Independent Order of Odd Fellows, Leedy, Renicker, Saint Patrick and Speicher.

=== Rivers ===
- Salamonie River
- Wabash River

=== Lakes ===
- Hominy Ridge Lake

== School districts ==
- Metropolitan School District of Wabash County Schools

== Political districts ==
- Indiana's 5th congressional district
- State House District 22
- State Senate District 17
