= Greene–Sullivan State Forest =

State forest in Indiana, U.S.

- IUCN category VI (protected area with sustainable use of natural resources)
- Location within Indiana
- Location: Greene and Sullivan Counties, Indiana, USA
- Nearest city: Dugger, Indiana
- Coordinates: 38°59′10″N 87°14′37″W
- Governing body: Indiana Department of Natural Resources

Greene–Sullivan State Forest is a state forest in Dugger, Indiana. The forest was founded in 1936 after the Indiana Department of Natural Resources received over 3,000 acres (1,200 ha) of land from coal firms; it now contains over 9,000 acres (3,600 ha), including over 120 lakes. The forest provides fishing, camping, hunting, and horseback riding.
