= Frances Slocum State Forest =

State forest in Miami County, Indiana, US

- IUCN category III (natural monument or feature)
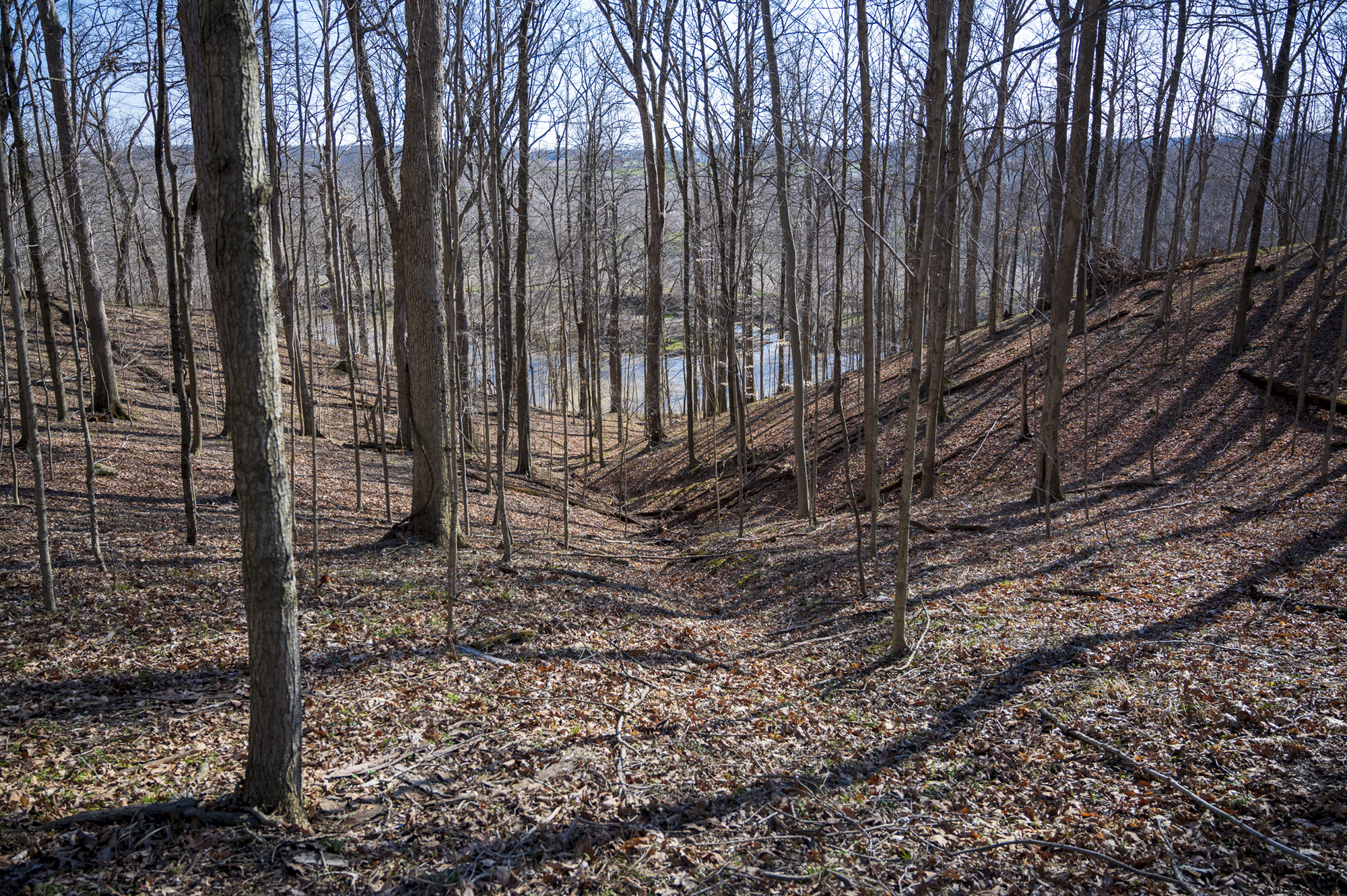
- A view of Mississinewa River from Frances Slocum State Forest

- Location within Indiana Location within the United States
- Location: Miami County, Indiana, US
- Nearest city: Peru, Indiana
- Coordinates: 40°43′48″N 85°57′54″W
- Area: 516 acres (2.09 km^{2})
- Governing body: Nature Conservancy

Frances Slocum State Forest is 516 acres of natural land managed by the Indiana Department of Natural Resources.

== Location ==
Located near Kokomo, Peru and Wabash, in Miami County, Indiana. Some nearby attractions include the Mississinewa Reservoir, Asherwood Nature Preserve and Salmonie River State Forest.

Roughly triangular, the park runs beside the Mississinewa River. Frances Slocum has 516 acres.

== Petition to state forest ==
In 2019 a group called Friends of Salamonie Forest asked for the Indiana Natural Resources Commission to designate the Frances Slocum State Forest as a state park along with Salamonie Forest. The petition, which received over 850 signatures, argued that turning these areas into state parks would establish old forests, increase wildlife diversity and bring more visitors to northeast Indiana. Another main point of the petition was that it would stop logging plans from being enacted. In addition, the group called for better trails, to stop erosion that has started to occur through the forests.

At the time Huntington Mayor Brooks Fetter stated, "We want an extension to give us here in northeast Indiana an opportunity to see what can be done to save these trees and save these parks for ourselves and for our posterity."

People who opposed the petition said that it would limit recreational activities taking place at the park. They also said that the logging that is being proposed would not hurt the natural environment.

The commission unanimously voted to deny all parts of the petition, keeping Frances Slocum State Forest a place where logging, hunting and fishing can take place.

== Activities ==
Some activities that people can do while at Frances Slocum State Forest includes, equestrian trails, hiking trails, hunting, fishing, foraging, and there is access to the Mississinewa river. There is no camping available at Frances Slocum State Forest, this park is a day use only park.

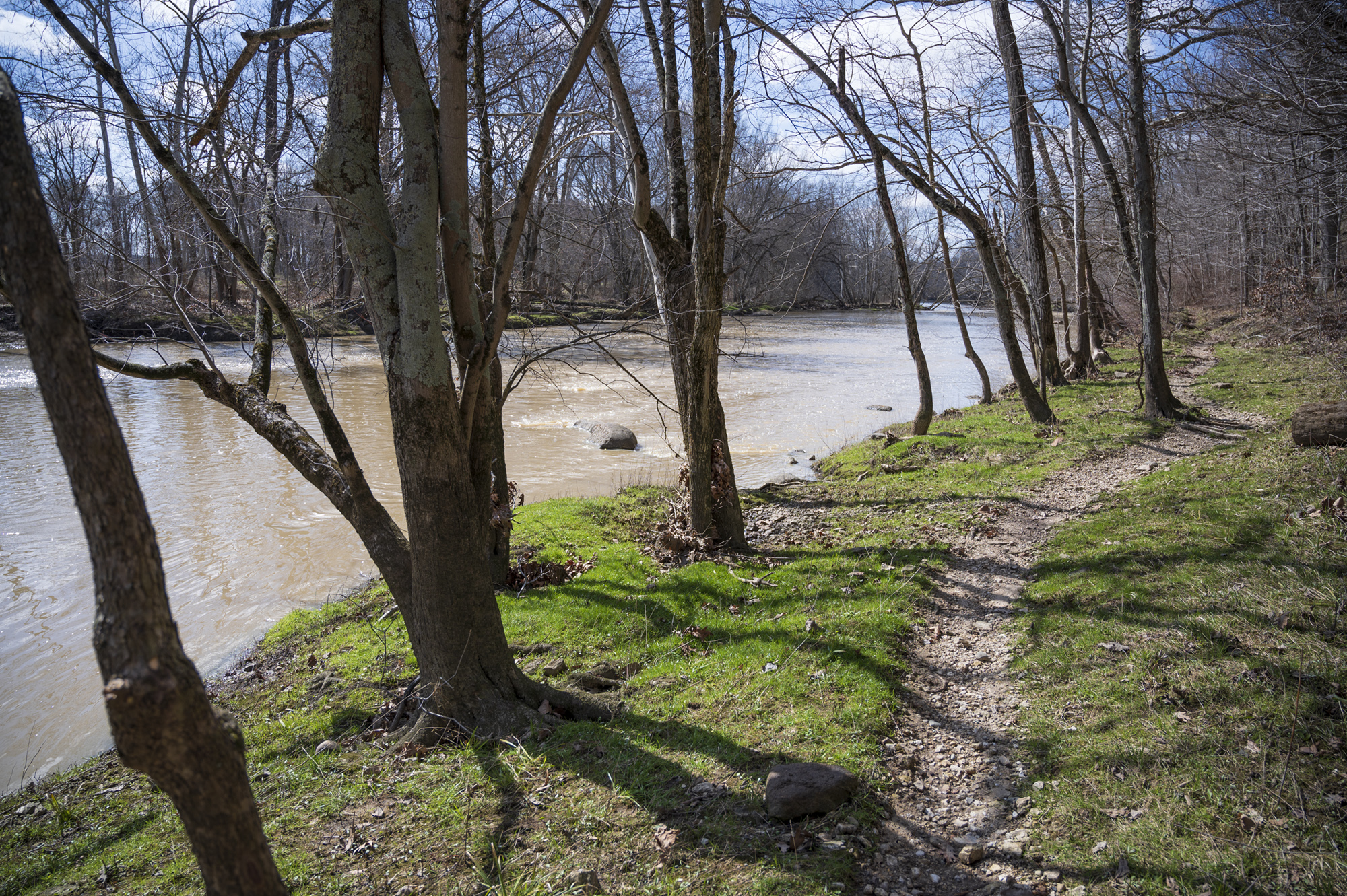
A trail in Frances Slocum State Forest that runs along the Mississinewa River.

The Frances Slocum Boy Scout Trail is 2.5 miles long, it has 160 foot elevation gain and is a loop trail. It is ranked as at moderate difficulty. Dogs are required to be on leash but are allowed to be on the trail. There are complaints that the trail is underkept and needs to be more maintained then it currently is.

== Flora and fauna ==
While Frances Slocum state forest does not have any rare tree types, some common trees found in Indiana that can be found at this state forest include the Conifer, Deciduous Hardwood, and Evergreen.

Some common wildlife that could also be spotted at Frances Slocum include, coyotes, beavers, cottontail rabbits, fox squirrels, gray squirrels, raccoons, gray foxes, and red foxes. Some amphibians and reptiles that could be spotted include the snapping turtle, and eastern hog-nosed snake.

Some native Indiana birds include cardinals, wild turkey, and bobwhite quail. In rare sightings the belted kingfisher can be spotted, it is the only kingfisher found in the state.

== Weather ==
In Miami County the average rain fall is 41 inches per year which is slightly above the average rainfall in the United States. The county receives 28 inches of snow on average, it has 179 sunny days per year. In the summer months average high temperature in July is 84 degrees while in the winter the average low in January is 17 degrees. The most fair weather conditions fall in June, September, and August.

== History ==
The park was established in the mid-1930s. The state forest is named after Frances Slocum. She was a Native American captive from the Delaware Tribe. She lived from 1773 to 1847. She lived with the Miami Indians in Ohio and Indiana. Given the opportunity to return to her blood family, she chose to live with her adopted Native American Family. She was married to a man named Shepoconah who would become of the Chief of the Miami People but would give up his duties as Chief when he became deaf. He started a village called Deaf Man's Village in Peru, Indiana.

In 2018, Drake Smith, 22, was beaten to death inside Frances Slocum State Forest. His murderer was convicted in 2022 and sentenced to 55 years. The man, Ethan Cain, 24, killed Smith over drugs and money. Smith's body was found the same day by mushroom hunters in the park. A few days later Cain and his accomplice Joshua Kean were arrested in southern California.
