= Urbana, Indiana =

- Unincorporated community and Census-designated place
- Location within Indiana Location within the United States
- Coordinates: 40°53′51″N 85°47′32″W
- Country: United States
- State: Indiana
- County: Wabash
- Township: Paw Paw
- Elevation: 794 ft (242 m)
- Time zone: UTC-5 (Eastern (EST))
  - Summer (DST): UTC-4 (EDT)
- ZIP code: 46990
- FIPS code: 18-78056
- GNIS feature ID: 2830572

Urbana is an unincorporated community in Paw Paw Township, Wabash County, in the U.S. state of Indiana.

== History ==
The Urbana post office has been in operation since 1858.

== Demographics ==
Historical population
Census	Pop.	Note	%±
2023 (est.)	110

The United States Census Bureau defined Urbana as a census designated place in the 2022 American Community Survey.
