= Ijamsville, Indiana =

- Unincorporated community
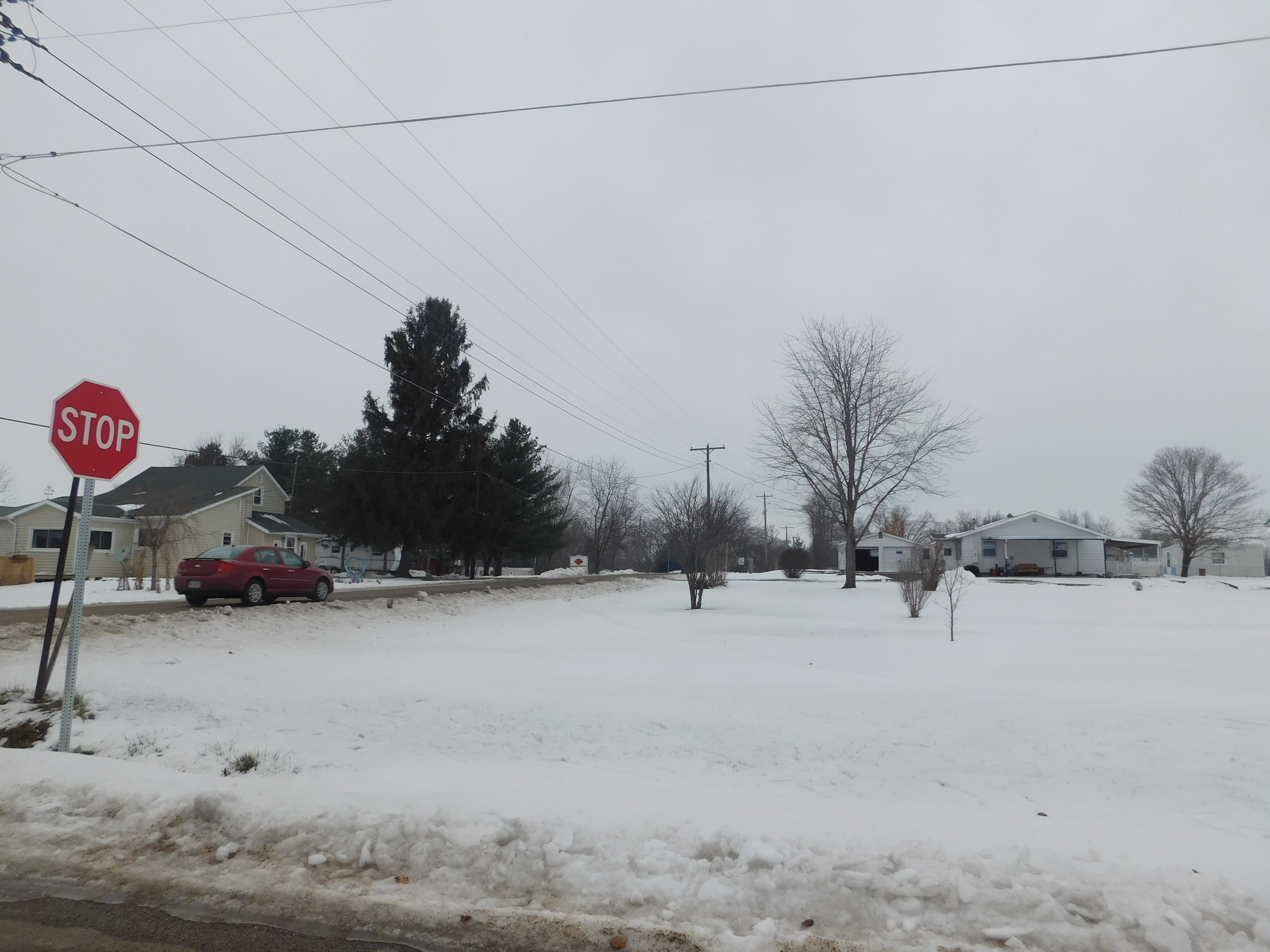
- A snowed-over Ijamsville in December 2016.

- Location within Indiana Location within the United States
- Coordinates: 40°57′35″N 85°49′58″W
- Country: United States
- State: Indiana
- County: Wabash
- Township: Pleasant
- Elevation: 771 ft (235 m)
- Time zone: UTC-5 (Eastern (EST))
  - Summer (DST): UTC-4 (EDT)
- ZIP code: 46962
- FIPS code: 18-35572
- GNIS feature ID: 436705

Ijamsville is an unincorporated community in Pleasant Township, Wabash County, in the U.S. state of Indiana.

== History ==
Ijamsville was platted in 1872. An old variant name of the community was called South Laketon.

A post office was established at Ijamsville in 1874, and remained in operation until it was discontinued in 1923.
