= Salamonie River =

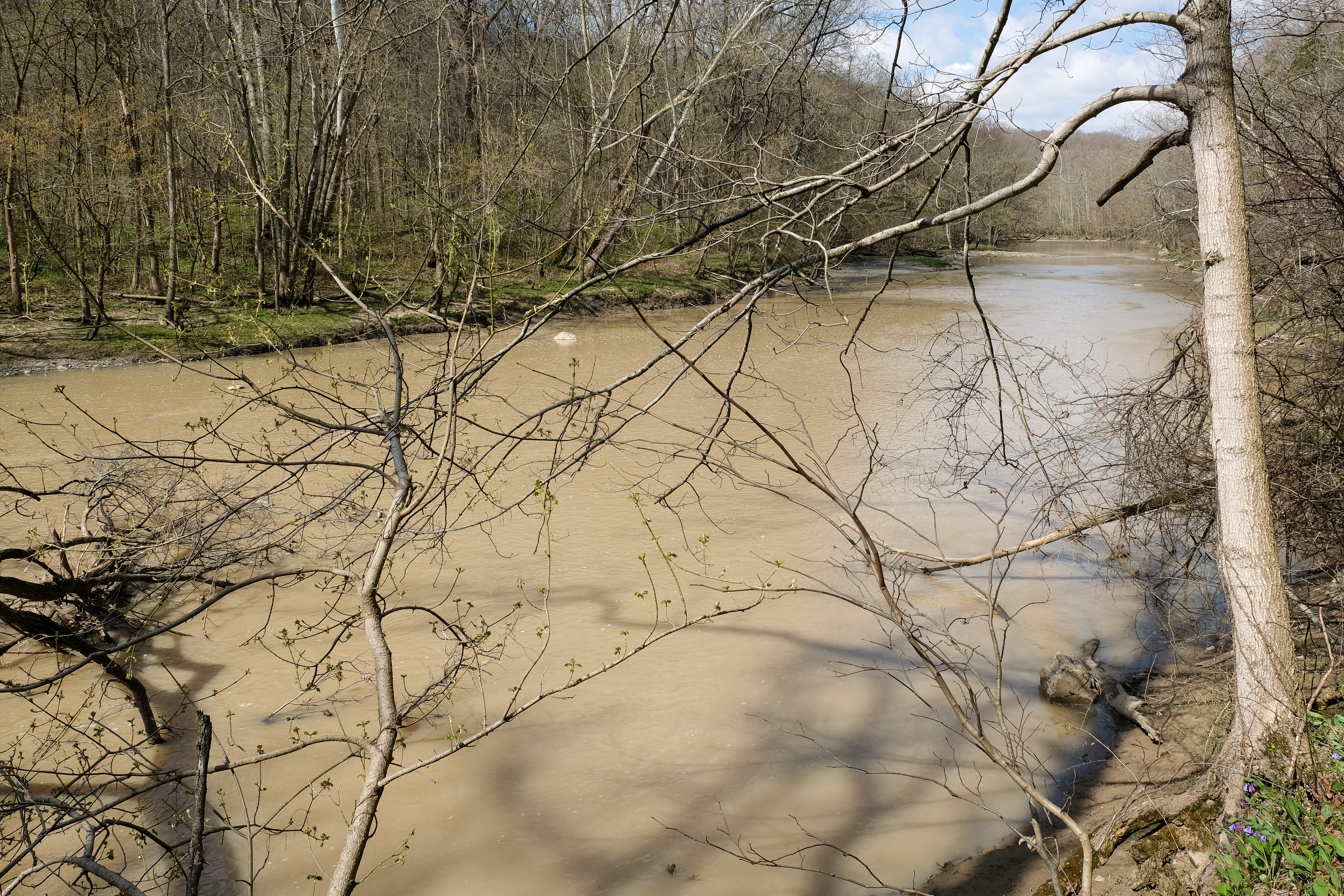
- The Salamonie River in Lagro Township

- Location of the mouth of the Salamonie River in Indiana

Location
- Country: United States
- State: Indiana
- Counties: Jay, Blackford, Wells, Huntington, Wabash

Physical characteristics
- Source
  - location: near Salamonia, Indiana in Jay County
  - coordinates: 40.3683793°N 84.8257967°W
- Mouth: Wabash River
  - location: near Lagro, Indiana
  - coordinates: 40.8328218°N 85.7177603°W
  - elevation: 669 feet (204 m)
- Length: 84.4 miles (135.8 km)
- Discharge
  - location: Dora, Indiana
  - average: 510 cu/ft. per sec. (average from the years 1925-2002)

The Salamonie River is a tributary of the Wabash River, in eastern Indiana in the United States. The river is 84.4 miles (135.8 km) long. It is part of the watershed of the Mississippi River, via the Wabash and Ohio rivers. The USS Salamonie was named for the river.

The Salamonie River originates near Salamonia in southeastern Jay County and flows generally northwestwardly through Blackford, Wells, Huntington and Wabash counties, past the communities of Portland, Pennville, Montpelier, Warren and Mount Etna. It joins the Wabash River from the south in Wabash County, opposite Lagro.

In Wabash County, a U.S. Army Corps of Engineers dam, completed for the purpose of flood control in 1966, causes the river to form Salamonie Lake.

The United States Board on Geographic Names settled on "Salamonie River" as the stream's name in 1917. According to the Geographic Names Information System, it has also been known historically as "Salamanie River", "Salamonia River", and "Salamanic River."

The name Salamonie is derived from the Miami Indian word osahmonee which means "yellow paint". The Indians would make yellow paint from the bloodroot plant that grew along the river banks.

== See also ==
- List of Indiana rivers
