= Owen–Putnam State Forest =

State forest in Indiana, U.S.

- IUCN category VI (protected area with sustainable use of natural resources)
- Location within Indiana
- Location: Owen and Putnam Counties, Indiana, USA
- Nearest city: Spencer, Indiana
- Coordinates: 39°28′30″N 86°52′10″W
- Governing body: Indiana Department of Natural Resources

Owen–Putnam State Forest is a state forest in Spencer, Indiana. The forest offers hunting for squirrel, deer, and turkey as well as camping and trails for hiking, horseback riding, and mountain biking. The hardwood forests on the rolling hills of southern Indiana also include a 50-foot sandstone bluff.
