= Somerset, Indiana =

- Census-designated place
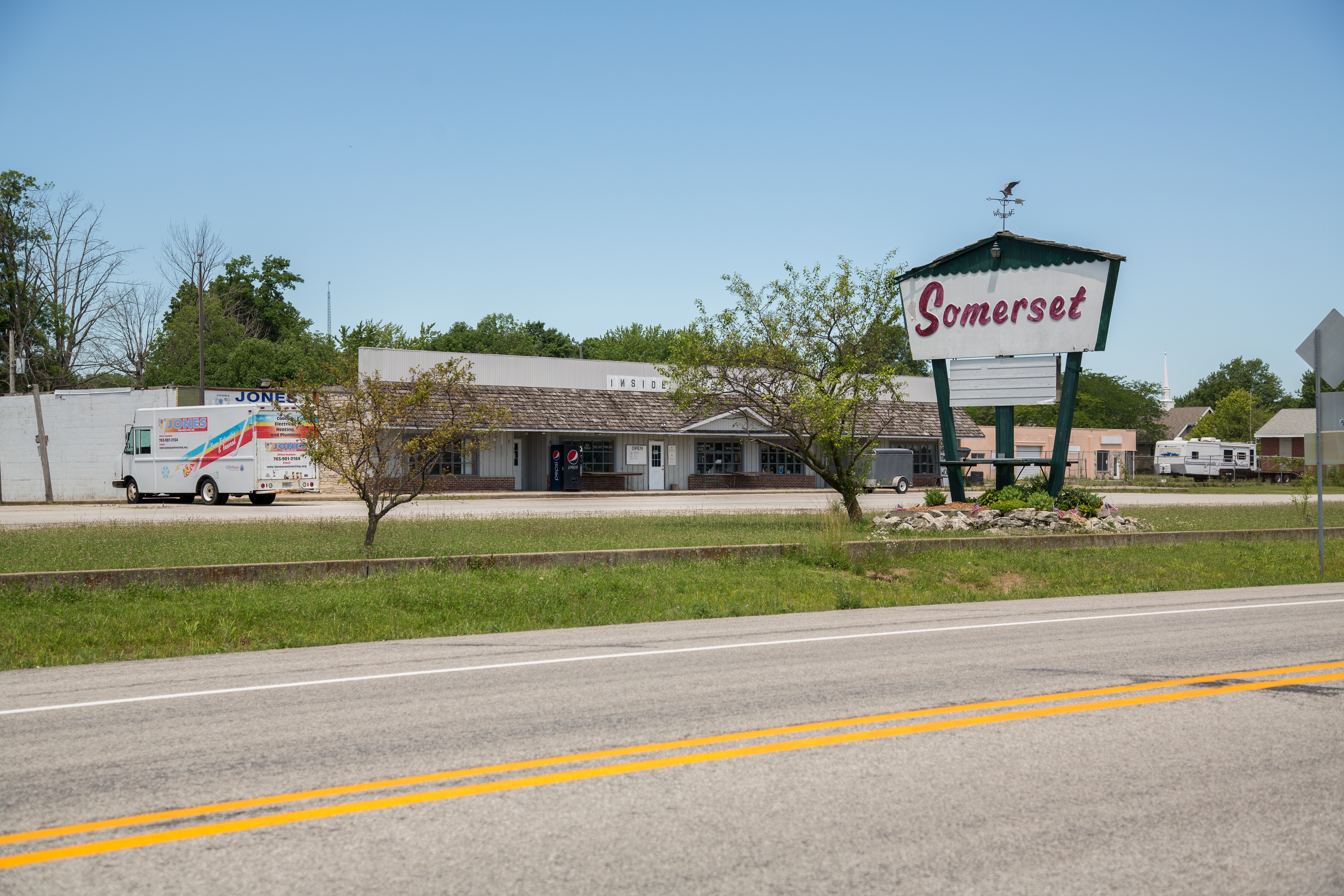

- Location of Somerset in Wabash County, Indiana.
- Coordinates: 40°40′10″N 85°49′53″W
- Country: United States
- State: Indiana
- County: Wabash
- Township: Waltz

Area
  - Total: 0.82 sq mi (2.13 km^{2})
  - Land: 0.68 sq mi (1.76 km^{2})
  - Water: 0.14 sq mi (0.37 km^{2})
- Elevation: 787 ft (240 m)

Population (2020)
  - Total: 385
  - Density: 565.6/sq mi (218.39/km^{2})
- Time zone: UTC-5 (Eastern (EST))
  - Summer (DST): UTC-4 (EDT)
- ZIP code: 46940
- FIPS code: 18-70524
- GNIS feature ID: 2631626

Somerset is an unincorporated census-designated place in Waltz Township, Wabash County, in the U.S. state of Indiana. As of the 2020 census, Somerset had a population of 385.

== History ==
The post office at Somerset has been in operation since 1848. An old variant name of the community was called Springfield.

Somerset was mostly destroyed and partially relocated by the time the Upper Wabash Valley Flood Control Project Mississinewa dam was completed in 1967, as designed by the US Army Corps of Engineers and the Indiana Flood Control and Water Resources Commission beginning in 1945. The original Somerset is 11 miles from the Peoria, Indiana dam, and what remains of it is now underwater during most months.

== Demographics ==
Historical population
Census	Pop.	Note	%±
2020	385		—
U.S. Decennial Census
