= Richvalley, Indiana =

- Unincorporated community
- Location within Indiana Location within the United States
- Coordinates: 40°47′06″N 85°55′13″W
- Country: United States
- State: Indiana
- County: Wabash
- Township: Noble
- Elevation: 659 ft (201 m)
- Time zone: UTC-5 (Eastern (EST))
  - Summer (DST): UTC-4 (EDT)
- ZIP code: 46992
- FIPS code: 18-64296
- GNIS feature ID: 449717

Richvalley is an unincorporated community in Noble Township, Wabash County, in the U.S. state of Indiana.

== History ==
Richvalley was first settled in 1827. An old variant name of the community was called Keller's Station.

A post office was established at Richvalley in 1861, and remained in operation until it was discontinued in 1974.
