= Ravinia State Forest =

State forest in Indiana, U.S.

- Location within Indiana Location within the United States
- Location: Morgan County, Indiana
- Nearest city: Martinsville, Indiana
- Coordinates: 39.44°N 86.54°W
- Area: 1,500 acres (6.1 km^{2})
- Governing body: Indiana Department of Natural Resources

Ravinia State Forest is a 1,500-acre (610 ha), heavily wooded state forest in Indiana. Located next to Morgan County's Burkart Creek Park, the property was acquired by use of the Indiana Department of Transportation's Crossroads 2000 fund.
