= Selmier State Forest =

State forest in Indiana, U.S.

- IUCN category V (protected landscape/seascape)
- Location within Indiana
- Location: Indiana, USA
- Nearest city: North Vernon, Indiana
- Coordinates: 39°01′48″N 85°36′07″W
- Area: 355 acres (1.44 km^{2})
- Established: 1927
- Governing body: Indiana DNR
- Website: www.in.gov/dnr/forestry/4818.htm

Selmier State Forest was established through a donation to the Indiana Department of Natural Resources by Mrs. Frank Selmier, on behalf of her husband Frank. Due to Frank's interest in the outdoors, he planted black locust, pine, black walnut, tulip-tree, and sycamore on many acres from the years of 1921 to 1934. The forest includes six short trails.

The park does not offer any amenities such as public restrooms, camp sites, or boat ramps. Both fishing and hunting are available however.
