= Salamonie River State Forest =

State forest in Indiana, U.S.

- IUCN category V (protected landscape/seascape)
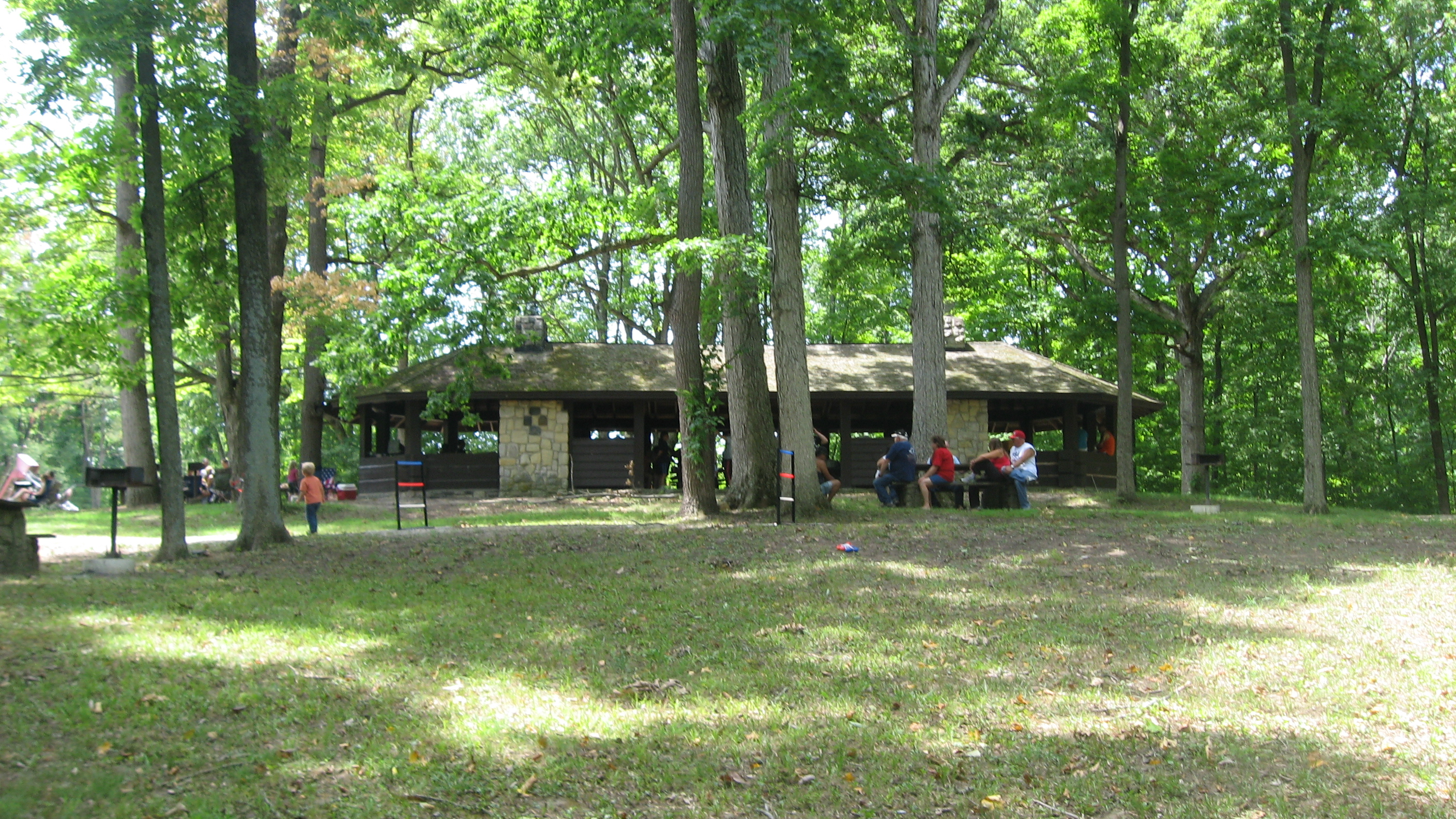
- Hominy Ridge Shelter House in Wabash County

- Location within Indiana
- Location: Wabash and Huntington counties, Indiana, USA
- Nearest city: Lagro, Indiana
- Coordinates: 40°48′48″N 85°41′57″W
- Area: 850 acres (3.4 km^{2})
- Governing body: Indiana Department of Natural Resources

Salamonie River State Forest is a 850-acre (3.4 km^{2}) state forest in Wabash and Huntington counties, Indiana.

The forest is located along the Salamonie River and includes Salamonie Lake. The nearest city to the forest is Lagro. Salamonie State Forest is administered by the Indiana Department of Natural Resources. Salamonie River State Forest was established in the mid-1930s; the Civilian Conservation Corps reforested the site and built its recreational facilities.

The Hominy Ridge Shelter House was listed on the National Register of Historic Places in 1994.
