= La Fontaine, Indiana =

- Town
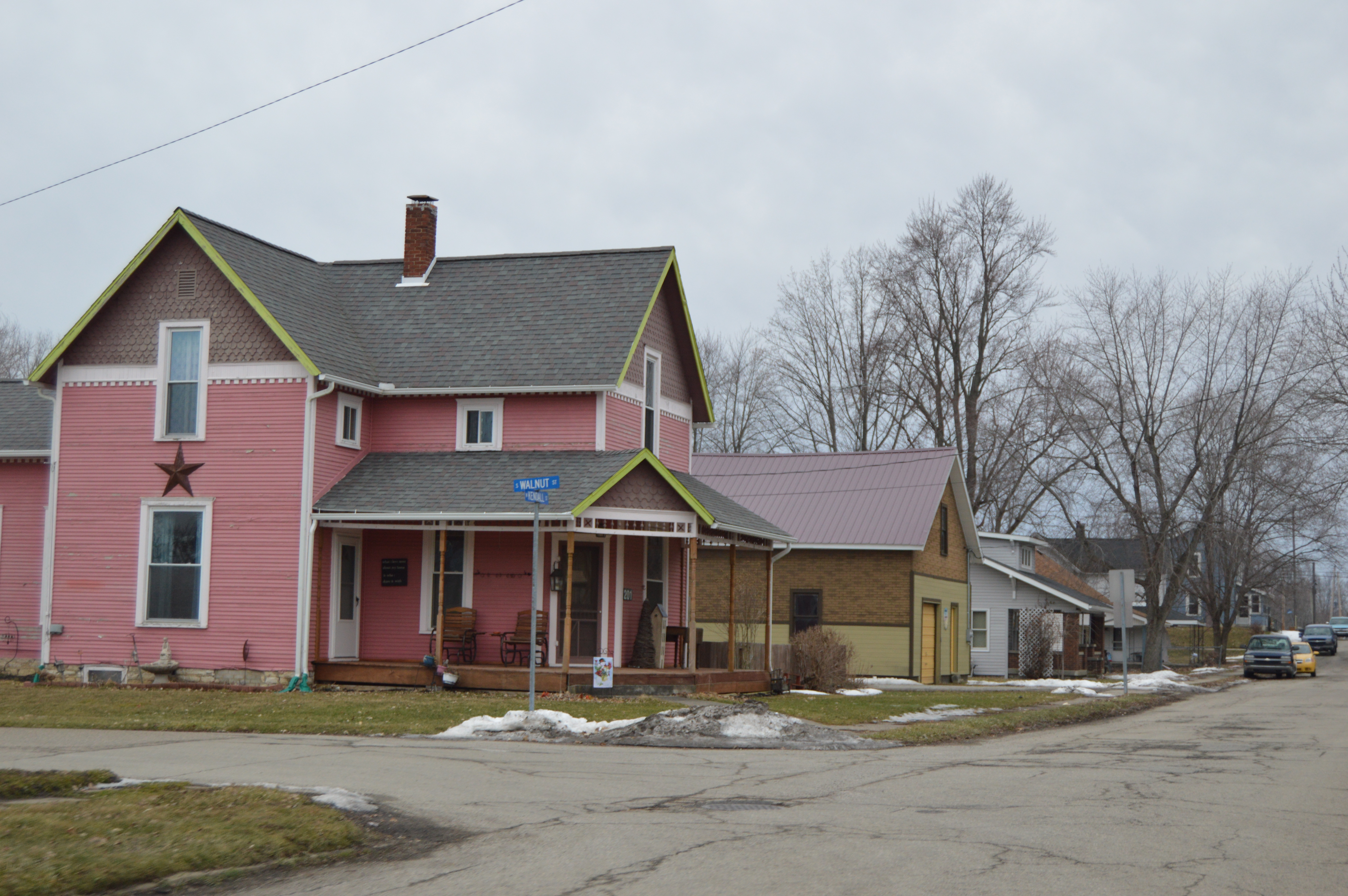

- Location of La Fontaine in Wabash County, Indiana.
- Coordinates: 40°40′26″N 85°43′19″W
- Country: United States
- State: Indiana
- County: Wabash
- Township: Liberty

Area
  - Total: 0.61 sq mi (1.58 km^{2})
  - Land: 0.61 sq mi (1.58 km^{2})
  - Water: 0 sq mi (0.00 km^{2})
- Elevation: 797 ft (243 m)

Population (2020)
  - Total: 798
  - Density: 1,305.7/sq mi (504.15/km^{2})
- Time zone: UTC-5 (EST)
  - Summer (DST): UTC-5 (EST)
- ZIP code: 46940
- Area code: 765
- FIPS code: 18-40842
- GNIS feature ID: 2396699
- Website: www.in.gov/towns/lafontaine/

La Fontaine is a town in Liberty Township, Wabash County, in the U.S. state of Indiana. The population was 798 at the 2020 census. Its name means "The Fountain" in French.

== History ==
The community was named after Francis La Fontaine, a Miami Indian chief. According to early maps, the town was originally known as Ashland.

The La Fontaine post office has been in operation since 1848.

The LaFontaine Historic District was listed on the National Register of Historic Places in 2014.

== Geography ==
According to the 2010 census, La Fontaine has a total area of 0.61 square miles (1.58 km^{2}), of which 0.6 square miles (1.55 km^{2}) (or 98.36%) is land and 0.01 square miles (0.03 km^{2}) (or 1.64%) is water.

== Demographics ==
Historical population
| Census | Pop. | Note | %± |
|---|---|---|---|
| 1880 | 295 | | — |
| 1910 | 683 | | — |
| 1920 | 601 | | −12.0% |
| 1930 | 604 | | 0.5% |
| 1940 | 554 | | −8.3% |
| 1950 | 627 | | 13.2% |
| 1960 | 779 | | 24.2% |
| 1970 | 793 | | 1.8% |
| 1980 | 946 | | 19.3% |
| 1990 | 909 | | −3.9% |
| 2000 | 900 | | −1.0% |
| 2010 | 875 | | −2.8% |
| 2020 | 798 | | −8.8% |
U.S. Decennial Census

=== 2010 census ===
As of the census of 2010, there were 875 people, 328 households, and 223 families living in the town. The population density was 1,458.3 inhabitants per square mile (563.1/km^{2}). There were 374 housing units at an average density of 623.3 per square mile (240.7/km^{2}). The racial makeup of the town was 98.5% White, 0.1% African American, 0.2% Native American, 0.2% from other races, and 0.9% from two or more races. Hispanic or Latino of any race were 1.1% of the population.

There were 328 households, of which 32.3% had children under the age of 18 living with them, 52.7% were married couples living together, 11.9% had a female householder with no husband present, 3.4% had a male householder with no wife present, and 32.0% were non-families. 29.3% of all households were made up of individuals, and 15.3% had someone living alone who was 65 years of age or older. The average household size was 2.39 and the average family size was 2.93.

The median age in the town was 41.9 years. 23.2% of residents were under the age of 18; 6.8% were between the ages of 18 and 24; 22.9% were from 25 to 44; 22.6% were from 45 to 64; and 24.6% were 65 years of age or older. The gender makeup of the town was 45.6% male and 54.4% female.

=== 2000 census ===
As of the census of 2000, there were 900 people, 352 households, and 237 families living in the town. The population density was 1,470.2 inhabitants per square mile (567.6/km^{2}). There were 379 housing units at an average density of 619.1 per square mile (239.0/km^{2}). The racial makeup of the town was 96.89% White, 0.22% African American, 0.67% Native American, 0.22% Asian, 1.00% from other races, and 1.00% from two or more races. Hispanic or Latino of any race were 2.00% of the population.

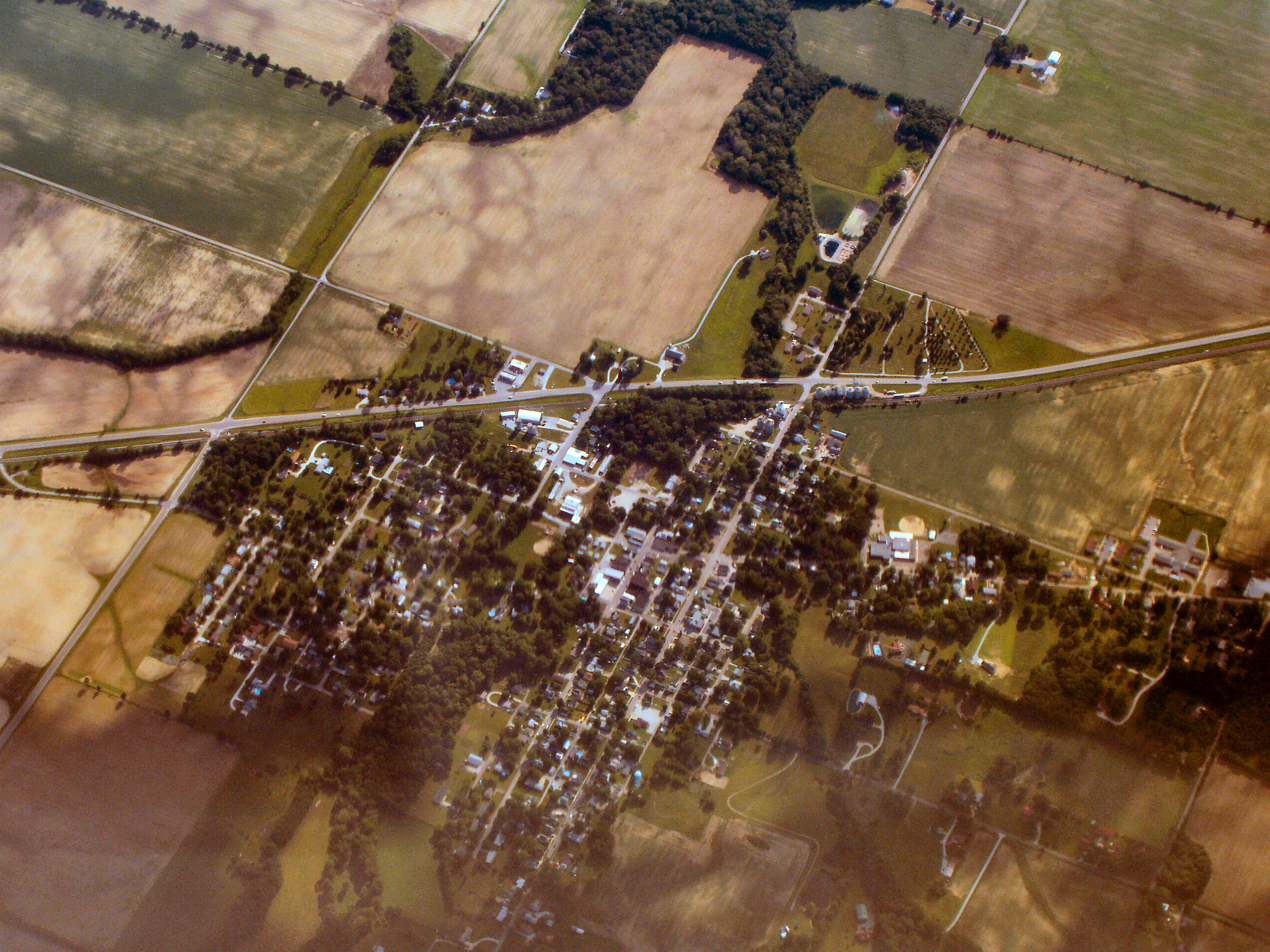
La Fontaine from the air, looking west.

There were 352 households, out of which 28.1% had children under the age of 18 living with them, 54.0% were married couples living together, 7.4% had a female householder with no husband present, and 32.4% were non-families. 29.8% of all households were made up of individuals, and 13.6% had someone living alone who was 65 years of age or older. The average household size was 2.30 and the average family size was 2.80.

In the town, the population was spread out, with 22.3% under the age of 18, 7.1% from 18 to 24, 27.0% from 25 to 44, 20.6% from 45 to 64, and 23.0% who were 65 years of age or older. The median age was 40 years. For every 100 females, there were 87.9 males. For every 100 females age 18 and over, there were 82.0 males.

The median income for a household in the town was $43,393, and the median income for a family was $47,031. Males had a median income of $31,042 versus $22,750 for females. The per capita income for the town was $17,203. About 1.2% of families and 3.8% of the population were below the poverty line, including 3.0% of those under age 18 and 1.7% of those age 65 or over.

== Notable people ==
- Mike "Doc" Emrick, retired television sportscaster
