= Martin State Forest =

State forest in Indiana, U.S.

- IUCN category V (protected landscape/seascape)
- Location within Indiana
- Location: Martin County, Indiana, USA
- Nearest city: Shoals, Indiana
- Coordinates: 38°42′06″N 86°44′08″W
- Area: 7,023 acres (28.42 km^{2})
- Governing body: Indiana Department of Natural Resources

Martin State Forest is a 7,023-acre (28.42 km^{2}) state forest in Martin County, Indiana. The nearest city to the forest is Shoals. Martin State Forest is administered by the Indiana Department of Natural Resources.
