= Pike State Forest (Indiana) =

State forest in Indiana, U.S.

- IUCN category V (protected landscape/seascape)
- Location within Indiana
- Location: Pike County, Indiana, USA
- Nearest city: Winslow, Indiana
- Coordinates: 38°21′37″N 87°09′27″W
- Area: 4,444 acres (17.98 km^{2})
- Governing body: Indiana Department of Natural Resources

Pike State Forest is a 4,444-acre (17.98 km^{2}) state forest in Pike County, Indiana. The nearest city to the forest is Winslow. The Patoka River runs through the forest, which has a varied topography consisting of both hills and lowlands near the river. The land comprising the forest was acquired over a period ranging from the 1930s to the 1950s. The buildings and facilities in the forest were mainly constructed by the Works Progress Administration using wood from the area. Pike is administered by the Indiana Department of Natural Resources; since 1997, it has been under the administration of nearby Ferdinand State Forest.
