= Wabash County, Indiana =

County in Indiana, United States

- County
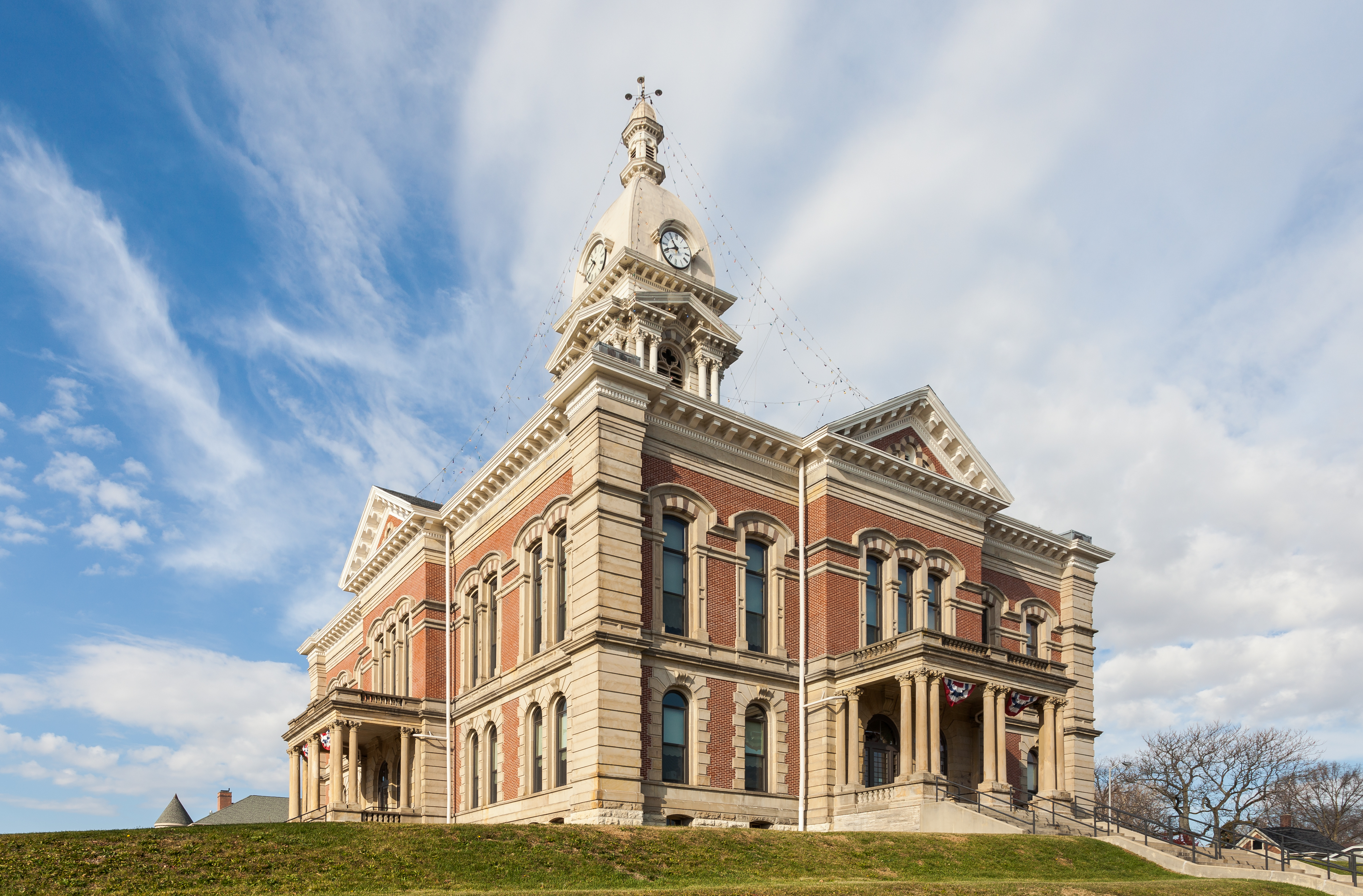
- Wabash County Courthouse

- Location within the U.S. state of Indiana
- Coordinates: 40.85°N 85.79°W
- Country: United States
- State: Indiana
- Founded: January 1820
- Organized: 1835
- Named for: Wabash River
- Seat: Wabash
- Largest city: Wabash

Area
  - Total: 420.98 sq mi (1,090.3 km^{2})
  - Land: 412.43 sq mi (1,068.2 km^{2})
  - Water: 8.54 sq mi (22.1 km^{2}) 2.03%

Population (2020)
  - Total: 30,976
  - Estimate (2025): 30,713 ▼
  - Density: 75.106/sq mi (28.999/km^{2})
- Time zone: UTC−5 (Eastern)
  - Summer (DST): UTC−4 (EDT)
- Congressional district: 2nd
- Website: www.in.gov/counties/wabash/
- Indiana county number 85

Wabash County is a county located in the northern central part of the U.S. state of Indiana. As of 2020, the population was 30,976. The county seat is Wabash.

== History ==
The area was inhabited for thousands of years by cultures of indigenous peoples. French explorers and traders encountered the historical Miami Native Americans beginning in the 17th century.

Wabash County, along with Delaware County, was originally formed Jan. 1820 out of the 1818 New Purchase resulting from the Treaty of St. Mary's. Wabash County was the Wabash River drainage area, and Delaware County, the White River drainage area. Numerous counties were carved out of the Wabash New Purchase. Wabash County as it exists today was organized out of a remnant portion of the original county in 1835.

The name "Wabash" is an English spelling of the earlier French name for the river, Ouabache. French traders derived the French version from the Indian name for the river, Wabashike (pronounced "Wah-bah-she-keh") (meaning "pure white".) Much of the river bottom is white limestone, now obscured by mud.

== Geography ==
According to the 2010 census, the county has a total area of 420.98 square miles (1,090.3 km^{2}), of which 412.43 square miles (1,068.2 km^{2}) (or 97.97%) is land and 8.54 square miles (22.1 km^{2}) (or 2.03%) is water.

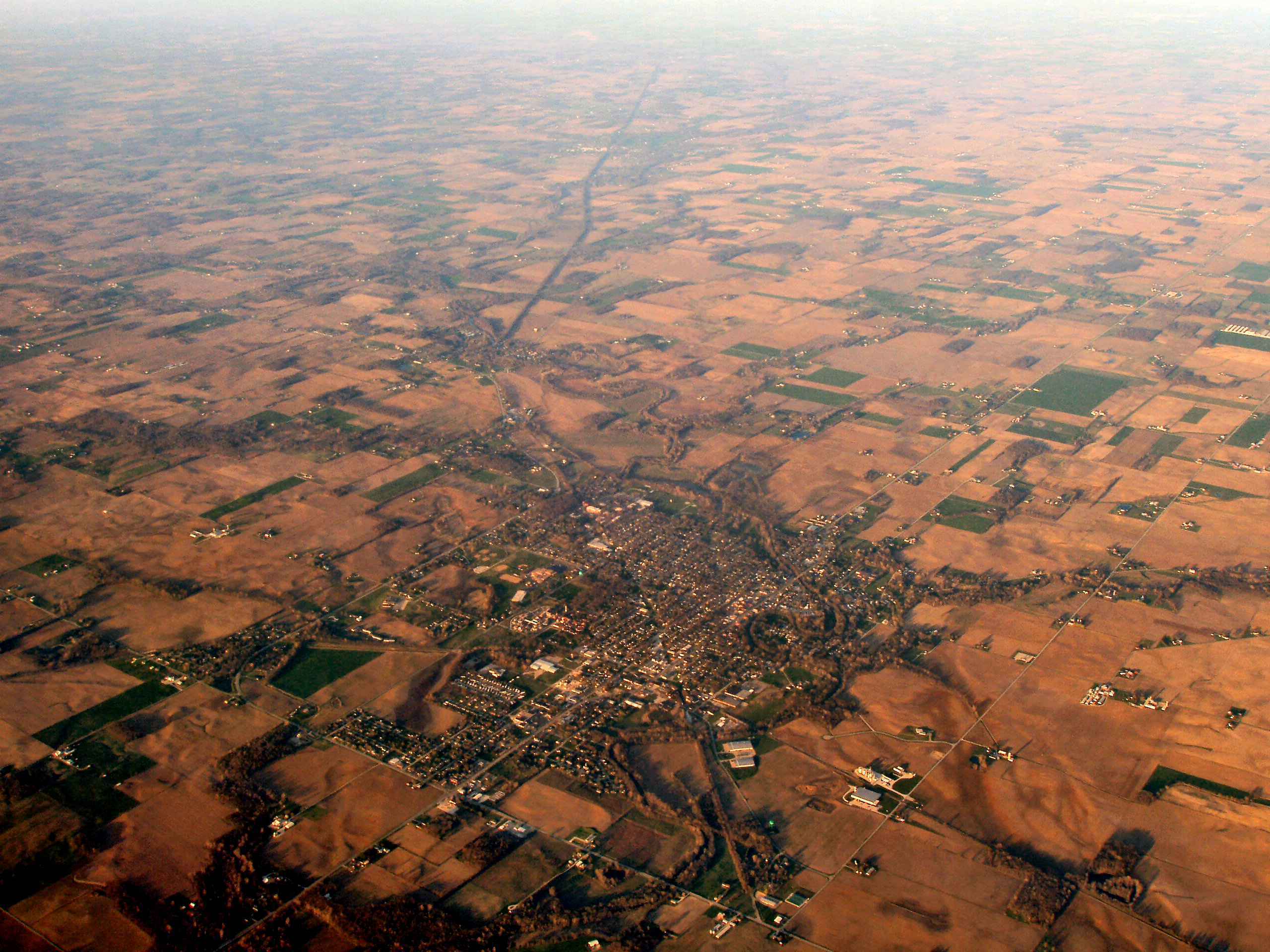
North Manchester from the air looking northeast.

=== Adjacent counties ===
- Kosciusko County (north)
- Whitley County (northeast)
- Huntington County (east)
- Grant County (south)
- Miami County (west)
- Fulton County (northwest)

=== Cities ===
- Wabash

=== Towns ===
- LaFontaine
- Lagro
- North Manchester
- Roann

=== Census-designated places ===
- Laketon
- Somerset

=== Other unincorporated places ===
- America
- Disko
- Ijamsville
- Liberty Mills
- Lincolnville
- Mount Vernon
- Richvalley
- Servia
- Speicherville
- Stockdale
- Treaty
- Urbana

=== Extinct ===
- Dora
- Rose Hill

=== Townships ===
- Chester
- Lagro
- Liberty
- Noble
- Paw Paw
- Pleasant
- Waltz

=== Major highways ===
- U.S. Route 24
- Indiana State Road 13
- Indiana State Road 15
- Indiana State Road 16
- Indiana State Road 114
- Indiana State Road 115
- Indiana State Road 124
- Indiana State Road 218
- Indiana State Road 524

== Climate and weather ==
Wabash, Indiana

Climate chart (precipitation, max. and min. temperature)
J	F	M	A	M	J	J	A	S	O	N	D
2.2 31 14	1.9 36 17	2.7 47 27	3.5 60 37	4.1 71 48	4.2 80 58	4.1 83 61	4 81 59	3.2 75 51	2.8 63 40	3.1 49 31	2.7 36 20
- █ Average max. and min. temperatures in °F
- █ Precipitation totals in inches
- Source: The Weather Channel
Metric conversion
J	F	M	A	M	J	J	A	S	O	N	D
55 −1 −10	48 2 −8	69 8 −3	90 16 3	103 22 9	107 27 14	105 28 16	102 27 15	81 24 11	71 17 4	79 9 −1	69 2 −7
- █ Average max. and min. temperatures in °C
- █ Precipitation totals in mm

In recent years, average temperatures in Wabash have ranged from a low of 14 °F (−10 °C) in January to a high of 83 °F (28 °C) in July, although a record low of −24 °F (−31 °C) was recorded in January 1985 and a record high of 103 °F (39 °C) was recorded in June 1988. Average monthly precipitation ranged from 1.89 inches (48 mm) in February to 4.23 inches (107 mm) in June.

== Government ==
The county government is a constitutional body, and is granted specific powers by the Constitution of Indiana, and by the Indiana Code.

County Council: The county council is the legislative branch of the county government and controls all the spending and revenue collection in the county. Representatives are elected from county districts. The council members serve four-year terms. They are responsible for setting salaries, the annual budget, and special spending. The council also has limited authority to impose local taxes, in the form of an income and property tax that is subject to state level approval, excise taxes, and service taxes.

Board of Commissioners: The executive body of the county is made of a board of commissioners. The commissioners are elected county-wide, in staggered terms, and each serves a four-year term. One of the commissioners, typically the most senior, serves as president. The commissioners are charged with executing the acts legislated by the council, collecting revenue, and managing the day-to-day functions of the county government.

Court: The county maintains a small claims court that can handle some civil cases. The judge on the court is elected to a term of four years and must be a member of the Indiana Bar Association. The judge is assisted by a constable who is also elected to a four-year term. In some cases, court decisions can be appealed to the state level circuit court.

County Officials: The county has several other elected offices, including sheriff, assessor, prosecutor, coroner, auditor, treasurer, recorder, surveyor, and circuit court clerk. Each of these elected officers serves a term of four years and oversees a different part of county government. Members elected to county government positions are required to declare party affiliations and to be residents of the county.

Wabash County is a Republican stronghold in presidential elections. Since 1888, only two Republican Party candidates have lost the county, William Howard Taft in 1912 & Barry Goldwater in 1964.

United States presidential election results for Wabash County, Indiana
Year	Republican		Democratic		Third party(ies)	
Year	No.	%	No.	%	No.	%
1888	3,986	58.41%	2,555	37.44%	283	4.15%
1892	3,687	55.20%	2,413	36.13%	579	8.67%
1896	4,319	59.04%	2,891	39.52%	105	1.44%
1900	4,433	58.48%	2,882	38.02%	266	3.51%
1904	4,516	59.44%	2,381	31.34%	700	9.21%
1908	4,091	53.55%	3,116	40.79%	433	5.67%
1912	1,363	20.08%	2,371	34.92%	3,055	45.00%
1916	3,849	50.37%	3,168	41.46%	624	8.17%
1920	8,018	60.33%	4,827	36.32%	445	3.35%
1924	7,277	60.44%	4,054	33.67%	709	5.89%
1928	8,537	68.25%	3,872	30.96%	99	0.79%
1932	6,652	49.36%	6,553	48.63%	271	2.01%
1936	7,223	53.02%	6,200	45.51%	200	1.47%
1940	8,755	61.11%	5,431	37.91%	141	0.98%
1944	8,357	62.30%	4,665	34.77%	393	2.93%
1948	8,149	61.53%	4,692	35.42%	404	3.05%
1952	9,980	67.94%	4,395	29.92%	315	2.14%
1956	10,318	71.18%	4,085	28.18%	93	0.64%
1960	10,420	68.12%	4,788	31.30%	89	0.58%
1964	6,905	47.51%	7,485	51.50%	145	1.00%
1968	8,611	61.07%	4,598	32.61%	892	6.33%
1972	10,011	68.29%	4,601	31.39%	47	0.32%
1976	8,534	59.51%	5,704	39.78%	102	0.71%
1980	8,738	60.82%	4,620	32.15%	1,010	7.03%
1984	9,862	70.30%	4,077	29.06%	89	0.63%
1988	9,153	68.39%	4,168	31.14%	63	0.47%
1992	7,062	46.77%	4,518	29.92%	3,521	23.32%
1996	6,990	53.79%	4,577	35.22%	1,429	11.00%
2000	8,321	64.59%	4,277	33.20%	285	2.21%
2004	9,607	70.63%	3,920	28.82%	75	0.55%
2008	8,238	59.30%	5,456	39.27%	198	1.43%
2012	8,644	67.03%	3,973	30.81%	278	2.16%
2016	9,821	72.47%	3,018	22.27%	713	5.26%
2020	10,762	73.72%	3,494	23.93%	342	2.34%
2024	10,425	74.57%	3,335	23.86%	220	1.57%

== Demographics ==
Historical population
Census	Pop.	Note	%±
1840	2,756		—
1850	12,138		340.4%
1860	17,547		44.6%
1870	21,305		21.4%
1880	25,241		18.5%
1890	27,126		7.5%
1900	28,235		4.1%
1910	26,926		−4.6%
1920	27,231		1.1%
1930	25,170		−7.6%
1940	26,601		5.7%
1950	29,047		9.2%
1960	32,605		12.2%
1970	35,553		9.0%
1980	36,640		3.1%
1990	35,069		−4.3%
2000	34,960		−0.3%
2010	32,888		−5.9%
2020	30,976		−5.8%
2025 (est.)	30,713	▼	−0.8%
U.S. Decennial Census; 1790-1960 1900-1990; 1990-2000 2010-2013

=== Racial and ethnic composition ===
Wabash County, Indiana – Racial and ethnic composition Note: the US Census treats Hispanic/Latino as an ethnic category. This table excludes Latinos from the racial categories and assigns them to a separate category. Hispanics/Latinos may be of any race.
Race / Ethnicity (NH = Non-Hispanic)	Pop 1980	Pop 1990	Pop 2000	Pop 2010	Pop 2020	% 1980	% 1990	% 2000	% 2010	% 2020
White alone (NH)	36,012	34,261	33,803	31,369	28,634	98.29%	97.70%	96.69%	95.38%	92.44%
Black or African American alone (NH)	139	130	139	155	158	0.38%	0.37%	0.40%	0.47%	0.51%
Native American or Alaska Native alone (NH)	147	248	217	211	126	0.40%	0.71%	0.62%	0.64%	0.41%
Asian alone (NH)	64	103	140	134	161	0.17%	0.29%	0.40%	0.41%	0.52%
Native Hawaiian or Pacific Islander alone (NH)	x	x	11	6	9	x	x	0.03%	0.02%	0.03%
Other race alone (NH)	53	6	13	9	66	0.14%	0.02%	0.04%	0.03%	0.21%
Mixed race or Multiracial (NH)	x	x	223	307	925	x	x	0.64%	0.93%	2.99%
Hispanic or Latino (any race)	225	321	414	697	897	0.61%	0.92%	1.18%	2.12%	2.90%
Total	36,640	35,069	34,960	32,888	30,976	100.00%	100.00%	100.00%	100.00%	100.00%

=== 2020 census ===
As of the 2020 census, the county had a population of 30,976. The median age was 44.4 years. 21.6% of residents were under the age of 18 and 23.1% of residents were 65 years of age or older. For every 100 females there were 94.9 males, and for every 100 females age 18 and over there were 92.9 males age 18 and over.

The racial makeup of the county was 93.4% White, 0.5% Black or African American, 0.5% American Indian and Alaska Native, 0.5% Asian, <0.1% Native Hawaiian and Pacific Islander, 1.2% from some other race, and 3.8% from two or more races. Hispanic or Latino residents of any race comprised 2.9% of the population.

49.9% of residents lived in urban areas, while 50.1% lived in rural areas.

There were 12,721 households in the county, of which 26.5% had children under the age of 18 living in them. Of all households, 50.2% were married-couple households, 18.4% were households with a male householder and no spouse or partner present, and 25.0% were households with a female householder and no spouse or partner present. About 30.0% of all households were made up of individuals and 14.7% had someone living alone who was 65 years of age or older.

There were 14,037 housing units, of which 9.4% were vacant. Among occupied housing units, 75.3% were owner-occupied and 24.7% were renter-occupied. The homeowner vacancy rate was 1.9% and the rental vacancy rate was 9.9%.

=== 2010 census ===
As of the 2010 United States census, there were 32,888 people, 12,777 households, and 8,733 families residing in the county. The population density was 79.7 inhabitants per square mile (30.8/km^{2}). There were 14,171 housing units at an average density of 34.4 per square mile (13.3/km^{2}). The racial makeup of the county was 96.6% white, 0.7% American Indian, 0.5% black or African American, 0.4% Asian, 0.7% from other races, and 1.1% from two or more races. Those of Hispanic or Latino origin made up 2.1% of the population. In terms of ancestry, 31.3% were German, 18.1% were American, 10.1% were English, and 10.0% were Irish.

Of the 12,777 households, 29.9% had children under the age of 18 living with them, 54.4% were married couples living together, 9.5% had a female householder with no husband present, 31.7% were non-families, and 27.3% of all households were made up of individuals. The average household size was 2.43 and the average family size was 2.92. The median age was 41.2 years.

The median income for a household in the county was $47,697 and the median income for a family was $52,758. Males had a median income of $41,965 versus $26,944 for females. The per capita income for the county was $20,475. About 8.8% of families and 11.6% of the population were below the poverty line, including 15.5% of those under age 18 and 8.1% of those age 65 or over.

== See also ==
- National Register of Historic Places listings in Wabash County, Indiana
