= List of Indiana state historical markers in Sullivan County =

Location of Sullivan County in Indiana

This is a list of the Indiana state historical markers in Sullivan County.

This is intended to be a complete list of the official state historical markers placed in Sullivan County, Indiana, United States by the Indiana Historical Bureau. The locations of the historical markers and their latitude and longitude coordinates are included below when available, along with their names, years of placement, and topics as recorded by the Historical Bureau. There are eight historical markers located in Sullivan County.

== Historical markers ==
Marker title	Image	Year placed	Location	Topics
Grave of Jane Todd Crawford: Pioneer Heroine of Abdominal Surgery		1972	Western side of State Road 63 in Johnson Cemetery, 1 mile north of Graysville; 39°8′6″N 87°32′26″W	Science, Medicine, and Inventions, Women
Westernmost Naval Battle of the Revolution		1985	0.7 miles south of the junction of U.S. Route 41 and State Road 58, between Old U.S. Route 41/Earl J. Abe Rogers Road and the new U.S. Route 41, near Carlisle; 38°57′20″N 87°24′28″W	Military
Merom Conference Center		1989	Merom Conference Center, near the junction of Phillip and 5th Streets at Edward Ovellette Drive in Merom; 39°3′4″N 87°33′53″W	Education, Religion
Merom Bluff Chautauqua, 1905-1936		1989	Merom Bluff Park overlooking the Wabash River near a pavilion in Merom; 39°3′27″N 87°34′17″W	Special Events
Merom Founded, 1817		1989	1997 Third Street (State Road 63) in Merom; 39°3′25″N 87°34′1.6″W	Historic District, Neighborhoods, and Towns
Fairbanks' Massacre		1989	Northwestern corner of the junction of Main (State Road 63) and Market (County Road 925N) Streets, near the post office, in Fairbanks; 39°13′9.8″N 87°31′17.6″W	Military, American Indian/Native American
A Civil War Murder		1992	Eastern side of the junction of Main (State Road 63) and North Streets on the northern edge of Fairbanks; 39°13′16″N 87°31′16″W	Military, Politics
Sullivan Carnegie Library		2008	Sullivan Public Library (100 S. Crowder Street) in Sullivan; 39°5′40″N 87°24′42″W	Education and Libraries, Buildings and Architecture

== See also ==
- List of Indiana state historical markers
- National Register of Historic Places listings in Sullivan County, Indiana
