= National Register of Historic Places listings in Sullivan County, Indiana =

Location of Sullivan County in Indiana

This is a list of the National Register of Historic Places listings in Sullivan County, Indiana.

This is intended to be a complete list of the properties on the National Register of Historic Places in Sullivan County, Indiana, United States. Latitude and longitude coordinates are provided for many National Register properties; these locations may be seen together in a map.

There are 11 properties listed on the National Register in the county.

Properties and districts located in incorporated areas display the name of the municipality, while properties and districts in unincorporated areas display the name of their civil township. Properties and districts split between multiple jurisdictions display the names of all jurisdictions.

This National Park Service list is complete through NPS recent listings posted December 19, 2025.

== Current listings ==
	Name on the Register	Image	Date listed	Location	City or town	Description
1	Center Ridge Cemetery	Center Ridge Cemetery	August 8, 2018 (#100002499)	704 W. Johnson St. 39°05′32″N 87°25′20″W	Hamilton Township	
2	Daugherty-Monroe Archaeological Site (12SU13)	Daugherty-Monroe Archaeological Site (12SU13)	June 12, 1985 (#85001246)	Northern half of Section 21 Town 8 North Range 11 West; 39°07′30″N 87°38′22″W	Turman Township	
3	Merom Site and Fort Azatlan	Merom Site and Fort Azatlan	May 12, 1975 (#75000052)	North of Merom; 39°03′45″N 87°34′12″W	Gill Township and Merom	
4	Merom-Gill Township Carnegie Library		March 11, 2019 (#100003512)	8554 Market St. 39°03′23″N 87°33′54″W	Merom	
5	Shakamak State Park Historic District	Shakamak State Park Historic District	March 15, 2000 (#00000199)	6265 W. State Road 48, west of Jasonville; 39°10′35″N 87°14′04″W	Jackson Township	Extends into Clay and Greene counties
6	Shelburn Interurban Depot-THI&E Interurban Depot	Shelburn Interurban Depot-THI&E Interurban Depot	December 15, 2015 (#15000890)	3 N. Railroad St. 39°10′40″N 87°23′39″W	Shelburn	
7	Sherman Building	Sherman Building	September 22, 1986 (#86002712)	2-4 S. Court St. 39°05′43″N 87°24′31″W	Sullivan	
8	Sullivan County Courthouse	Sullivan County Courthouse	December 22, 2008 (#08001213)	100 Courthouse Square; 39°05′42″N 87°24′28″W	Sullivan	
9	Sullivan Courthouse Square Historic District	Sullivan Courthouse Square Historic District	September 4, 2018 (#100002867)	Roughly bounded by Section, Wall, State, and Harris Sts. 39°05′40″N 87°24′30″W	Sullivan	
10	Sullivan County Poor Home	Sullivan County Poor Home	March 15, 2000 (#00000207)	1447 County Road 75N, east of Sullivan; 39°05′51″N 87°22′57″W	Hamilton Township	
11	Union Christian College	Union Christian College	June 25, 1982 (#82000076)	3rd and Philip Sts. 39°03′03″N 87°33′53″W	Merom	

== See also ==
- List of National Historic Landmarks in Indiana
- National Register of Historic Places listings in Indiana
- Listings in neighboring counties: Clark (IL), Clay, Crawford (IL), Greene, Knox, Vigo
- List of Indiana state historical markers in Sullivan County
