= Jackson Hill =

Jackson Hill may refer to:

- Jackson Hill (composer), American composer
- Jackson Hill, Indiana, an unincorporated settlement in the United States
- Jackson Hill, Jersey City, a neighbourhood
- Jackson Hill (Georgia), a summit in Georgia
- Jackson Hill (Missouri), a summit in Missouri
- Jackson Hill Park, a park in Cincinnati, Ohio, USA

== See also ==
- Mount Jackson (disambiguation)
