= Sherman Building =

Sherman Building can refer to:
(sorted by state)

- Sherman Building (Sullivan, Indiana), listed on the National Register of Historic Places (NRHP) in Sullivan County, Indiana
- Sherman Building (Corpus Christi, Texas), listed on the NRHP in Nuences County, Texas
