= Scott City =

Scott City may refer to a place in the United States:

- Scott City, Indiana
- Scott City, Kansas
- Scott City, Missouri
- Scott City, Atchison County, Missouri
