= Gambill =

Gambill may refer to:

- Gambill (surname)
- Gambill, Indiana
