= Union Christian College =

Union Christian College may refer to:

- Union Christian College, Aluva, Kerala, India
- Union Christian College, Meghalaya, India
- Union Christian College, Merom, Indiana, US
