= Gambrill =

Gambrill is a surname. Notable people with the surname include:

- Anne Gambrill (1934–2026), New Zealand lawyer and judge
- Charles D. Gambrill (1834–1880), American architect
- Mike Gambrill (1935–2011), British track cyclist
- Stephen Warfield Gambrill (1873–1938), American politician

== See also ==
- Gambrill House, historic house in Maryland, U.S.
- Gambrills, Maryland
- Gambrell, another surname
- Gambill (surname), another surname
