= Paxton, Indiana =

- Unincorporated community
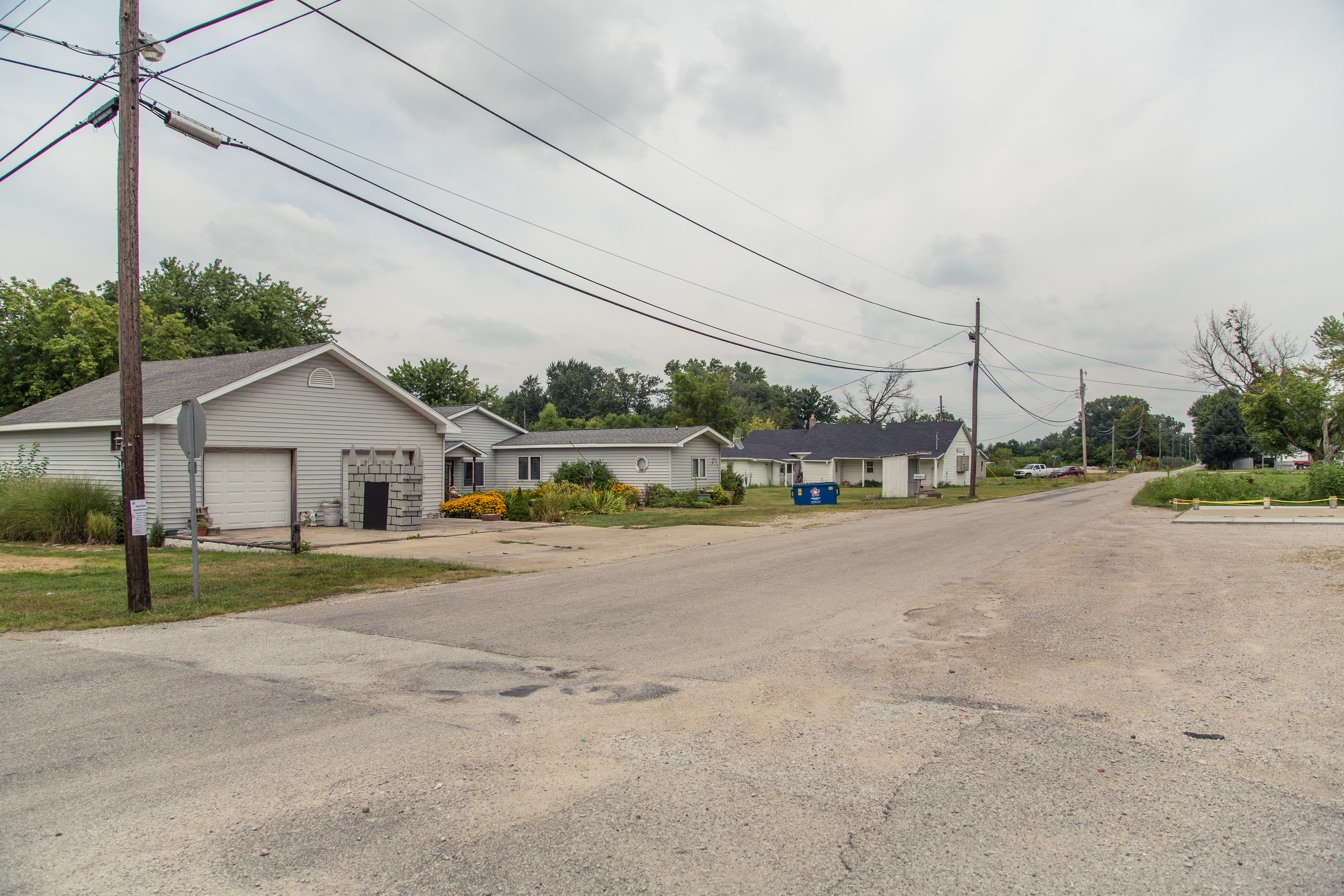

- Sullivan County, Indiana

- Paxton's location in Sullivan County
- Coordinates: 39°01′16″N 87°23′19″W
- Country: United States
- State: Indiana
- County: Sullivan
- Township: Haddon
- Elevation: 522 ft (159 m)
- Time zone: UTC-5 (Eastern (EST))
  - Summer (DST): UTC-4 (EDT)
- ZIP code: 47865
- Area codes: 812, 930
- FIPS code: 18-58500
- GNIS feature ID: 449706

Paxton is an unincorporated community in Haddon Township, Sullivan County, in the U.S. state of Indiana.

Paxton has nine cemeteries. Alsman Cemetery EST 1858 with 8 known memorials, Arnett Cemetery EST 1852 with twelve known memorials, Boone Cemetery EST 1816 with 53 known memorials, Loudermilk Cemetery EST 1853 with 3 known memorials, McCammon Cemetery EST Abt 1820 with 47 known memorials, McCammon Cemetery #1 EST 18?? With twenty known memorials, McClellan Snyder Cemetery EST 1821 with 238 known memorials, Neil-Paxton Cemetery EST 1821 with 225 known memorials, and the Providence Cemetery EST 1826 with 305 known memorials.

The community is part of the Terre Haute metropolitan area.

== History ==
Paxton was laid out in 1868, and was named after James H. Paxton, a local merchant. The post office at Paxton has been in operation since 1864.

== Geography ==
Paxton is located off Highway 41 between Carlisle and Sullivan at 39°01′16″N 87°23′19″W.

== Demographics ==
The United States Census Bureau defined Paxton as a census designated place in the 2022 American Community Survey.
