= Merom Conference Center =

Coordinates: 39.051393°N 87.565241°W

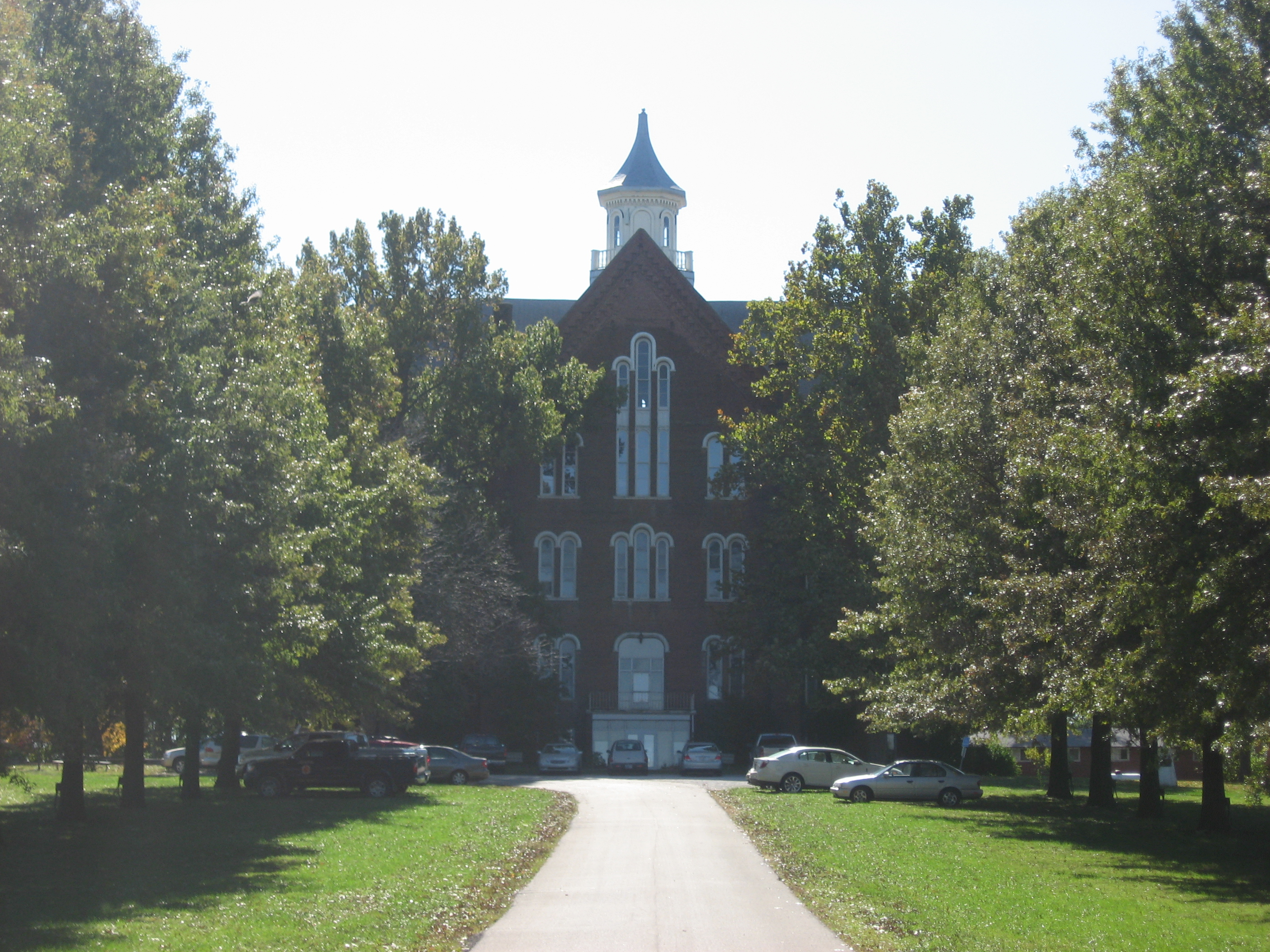
Merom Conference Center

The Merom Conference Center began as Union Christian College in 1859 and is now used as a camp and conference center for the Indiana-Kentucky Conference of the United Church of Christ (UCC). It is located in Merom, Indiana, on the Wabash River.

The Merom Conference Center is a member of the Outdoor Ministry Association, UCC.

== History ==
Four years after the founding of the college, the main building, College Hall, was completed. The college operated until 1924 when financial requirements instituted by the State of Indiana could not be met. In 1935, Arthur Erastus Holt, President of Chicago Theological Seminary, envisioned the reopening of the facility as the Merom Institute, a center for rural enrichment. One year later, Dr. Holt's vision became reality. Under the directorships of the Rev. Shirley Greene, Dr. Alan Jones, and others through the years, the Merom Institute grew as it provided ministry to the region until 1984 when the name was changed to the Merom Conference Center.

== Facilities ==
College Hall, which received Historic Landmark status in 1982, is the centerpiece of the facility. Other buildings on the location include: Hatten Chapel and the Gymnasium built in 1919; nine cabins and the Dining Hall built in the late 30s and early 40s; four residences, one that is used as a retreat house, one that serves as the directors residence, one that is used as staff housing and one that stands vacant. A swimming pool built in 1957 completes the physical plant. The grounds are composed of 30 acres (120,000 m^{2}) of lawn, flood-plain woods of 14 acres (57,000 m^{2}), a wooded bluff area of 10 acres (40,000 m^{2}) and 2 acres (8,000 m^{2}) each of pine grove and restored prairie.

== The Present ==
The Outdoor Ministries Committee of the Indiana-Kentucky Conference of the United Church of Christ provides for eight weeks of summer camp, conference wide youth events take place here several times a year, and a regional Emmaus and Chrysalis groups use the facilities 6 to 8 times a year. The rest of the schedule is filled in with church retreats, confirmation class retreats, work camps, men's group retreats, women's group retreats, youth group retreats and Outdoor Education.
