= Scotchtown =

Scotchtown may refer to:

- Scotchtown, Indiana
- Scotchtown, New York
- Scotchtown, Nova Scotia
- Scotchtown, Tasmania, a locality in Australia
- Scotchtown (plantation), a historic Virginia home once owned by Patrick Henry
- Scotchtown, County Cavan, a townland in Cavan, Ireland
- Scotchtown, County Tyrone, a townland in County Tyrone, Northern Ireland
