= Gilmour, Indiana =

- Unincorporated community
- Location within Indiana Location within the United States
- Coordinates: 39°07′53″N 87°14′27″W
- Country: United States
- State: Indiana
- County: Greene, Sullivan
- Township: Wright, Cass
- Elevation: 558 ft (170 m)
- Time zone: UTC-5 (Eastern)
  - Summer (DST): UTC-4 (EDT)
- ZIP code: 47438
- Area codes: 812, 930
- FIPS code: 18-27738
- GNIS feature ID: 435082

Gilmour is an unincorporated community in Greene and Sullivan counties, in the U.S. state of Indiana.

== History ==
Gilmour was founded in 1900, and was named for the Gilmour family, who were among those who first built there.
