= Haddon Township =

Haddon Township may refer to the following townships in the United States:

- Haddon Township, Sullivan County, Indiana
- Haddon Township, New Jersey
