= Hamilton Township, Indiana =

Hamilton Township is the name of three townships in the U.S. state of Indiana:

- Hamilton Township, Delaware County, Indiana
- Hamilton Township, Jackson County, Indiana
- Hamilton Township, Sullivan County, Indiana
