= Shiloh, Indiana =

- Unincorporated community
- Sullivan County's location in Indiana

- Location in Sullivan County, Indiana
- Coordinates: 39°02′20″N 87°17′33″W
- Country: United States
- State: Indiana
- County: Sullivan
- Township: Cass
- Elevation: 568 ft (173 m)
- Time zone: UTC-5 (Eastern (EST))
  - Summer (DST): UTC-4 (EDT)
- ZIP code: 47848
- Area codes: 812, 930
- GNIS feature ID: 443380

Shiloh is an unincorporated community in southern Cass Township, Sullivan County, in the U.S. state of Indiana.

The community is part of the Terre Haute Metropolitan Statistical Area.

== History ==
The community was likely named after the biblical city of Shiloh.

== Notable residents ==
- Arcturus Z. Conrad, author, pastor, theologian
- Richard Byrd, athlete
