= Mount Jackson =

Mount Jackson may refer to:

== Mountain summits ==
- Mount Jackson (Antarctica)
- Mount Jackson, Western Australia
- Mount Jackson (Colorado)
- Mount Jackson (Montana)
- Mount Jackson (Madison County, Montana), a mountain in Madison County, Montana
- Mount Jackson (New Hampshire)
- Mount Jackson (Wyoming)

== Communities ==
- Mount Jackson, Pennsylvania
- Mount Jackson, Virginia

== See also ==
- Jackson Hill (disambiguation)
- Jackson Mountains, Nevada
- Jackson Peak, Antarctica
- Chimney Rock (Jackson Butte), Colorado
