= Farnsworth, Indiana =

- Ghost town
- Sullivan County's location in Indiana

- Location in Sullivan County, Indiana
- Coordinates: 39°05′57″N 87°19′18″W
- Country: United States
- State: Indiana
- County: Sullivan
- Township: Cass
- Elevation: 518 ft (158 m)
- Time zone: UTC-5 (Eastern (EST))
  - Summer (DST): UTC-4 (EDT)
- ZIP code: 47882
- Area codes: 812, 930
- GNIS feature ID: 452895

Farnsworth was a former town in Cass Township, Sullivan County, in the U.S. state of Indiana.

== History ==
Extensive strip mining in the area caused the town of Farnsworth to become extinct.

A post office was established at Farnsworth in 1886, and remained in operation until it was discontinued in 1913.

== Geography ==
Farnsworth is located at 39°05′57″N 87°19′18″W.
