= Caledonia, Indiana =

- Ghost town
- Sullivan County's location in Indiana

- Location in Sullivan County, Indiana
- Coordinates: 39°05′56″N 87°20′06″W
- Country: United States
- State: Indiana
- County: Sullivan
- Township: Cass
- Elevation: 502 ft (153 m)
- Time zone: UTC-5 (Eastern (EST))
  - Summer (DST): UTC-4 (EDT)
- ZIP code: 47882
- Area codes: 812, 930
- GNIS feature ID: 452893

Caledonia was a former town in Cass Township, Sullivan County, in the U.S. state of Indiana.

== History ==
Extensive strip mining in the area caused the town of Caledonia to become extinct.

A post office was established at Caledonia in 1902, and operated until it was discontinued in 1909.

== Geography ==
Caledonia is located at 39°05′56″N 87°20′06″W.
