= New Lebanon, Indiana =

- Unincorporated community
- Sullivan County's location in Indiana

- Sullivan County, Indiana
- Coordinates: 39°02′27″N 87°28′16″W
- Country: United States
- State: Indiana
- County: Sullivan
- Township: Gill
- Elevation: 518 ft (158 m)
- Time zone: UTC-5 (Eastern (EST))
  - Summer (DST): UTC-4 (EDT)
- ZIP code: 47882
- Area codes: 812, 930
- FIPS code: 18-53118
- GNIS feature ID: 440072

New Lebanon is an unincorporated community in Gill Township, Sullivan County, in the U.S. state of Indiana.

The community is part of the Terre Haute Metropolitan Statistical Area.

== History ==
New Lebanon was founded in 1827, and was named after the biblical Mount Lebanon. A post office was established at New Lebanon in 1840, and remained in operation until it was discontinued in 1966.

== Geography ==
New Lebanon is located at 39°02′27″N 87°28′16″W.

== Demographics ==
The United States Census Bureau defined New Lebanon as a census designated place in the 2022 American Community Survey.
