= Wilfred, Indiana =

- Unincorporated community
- Sullivan County's location in Indiana

- Location in Sullivan County, Indiana
- Coordinates: 39°11′12″N 87°21′09″W
- Country: United States
- State: Indiana
- County: Sullivan
- Township: Jackson
- Elevation: 568 ft (173 m)
- Time zone: UTC-5 (Eastern (EST))
  - Summer (DST): UTC-4 (EDT)
- ZIP code: 47879
- Area codes: 812, 930
- GNIS feature ID: 446033

Wilfred is an unincorporated community in western Jackson Township, Sullivan County, in the U.S. state of Indiana.

The community is part of the Terre Haute Metropolitan Statistical Area.

== History ==
Wilfred was founded in 1902 as a mining community. The town's name was derived from the names of two local mine operators, Wilford and Fredman.

== Geography ==
Wilfred is located at 39°11′12″N 87°21′09″W.
