= Riverview, Indiana =

- Unincorporated community
- Sullivan County's location in Indiana

- Location in Sullivan County, Indiana
- Coordinates: 39°12′01″N 87°35′01″W
- Country: United States
- State: Indiana
- County: Sullivan
- Township: Fairbanks
- Elevation: 460 ft (140 m)
- Time zone: UTC-5 (Eastern (EST))
  - Summer (DST): UTC-4 (EDT)
- ZIP code: 47849
- Area codes: 812, 930
- GNIS feature ID: 442105

Riverview is an unincorporated community in Fairbanks Township, Sullivan County, in the U.S. state of Indiana, near the border with Illinois.

The community is part of the Terre Haute Metropolitan Statistical Area.
