= Cass, Indiana =

- Unincorporated community
- Sullivan County's location in Indiana

- Location in Sullivan County, Indiana
- Coordinates: 39°05′14″N 87°16′42″W
- Country: United States
- State: Indiana
- County: Sullivan
- Township: Cass
- Elevation: 571 ft (174 m)
- Time zone: UTC-5 (Eastern (EST))
  - Summer (DST): UTC-4 (EDT)
- ZIP code: 47882
- Area codes: 812, 930
- FIPS code: 18-10774
- GNIS feature ID: 432215

Cass is an unincorporated town in Cass Township, Sullivan County, in the U.S. state of Indiana. It is part of the Terre Haute Metropolitan Statistical Area; the United States Census Bureau delineated Cass as a census designated place in the 2022 American Community Survey.

A post office was established here in 1877, and remained in operation until it was discontinued in 1955.
