= Jefferson Township, Sullivan County, Indiana =

Jefferson Township
- Township
- Location in Sullivan County
- Coordinates: 38°57′43″N 87°17′19″W
- Country: United States
- State: Indiana
- County: Sullivan

Government
  - Type: Indiana township

Area
  - Total: 42.95 sq mi (111.2 km^{2})
  - Land: 42.42 sq mi (109.9 km^{2})
  - Water: 0.53 sq mi (1.4 km^{2}) 1.23%
- Elevation: 620 ft (190 m)

Population (2020)
  - Total: 355
  - Density: 8.37/sq mi (3.23/km^{2})
- ZIP codes: 47528, 47838, 47848, 47882
- GNIS feature ID: 453498

Jefferson Township is one of nine townships in Sullivan County, Indiana, United States. At the 2020 census, its population was 355 and it contained 218 housing units.

Historical population
Census	Pop.	Note	%±
1890	1,837		—
1900	1,953		6.3%
1910	2,199		12.6%
1920	2,177		−1.0%
1930	1,758		−19.2%
1940	1,903		8.2%
1950	1,400		−26.4%
1960	1,051		−24.9%
1970	800		−23.9%
1980	887		10.9%
1990	544		−38.7%
2000	495		−9.0%
2010	417		−15.8%
2020	355		−14.9%
Source: US Decennial Census

== Geography ==
According to the 2010 census, the township has a total area of 42.95 square miles (111.2 km^{2}), of which 42.42 square miles (109.9 km^{2}) (or 98.77%) is land and 0.53 square miles (1.4 km^{2}) (or 1.23%) is water.

=== Unincorporated towns ===
- Bucktown at 38.994767°N 87.260015°W
- Pleasantville at 38.966989°N 87.250292°W

(This list is based on USGS data and may include former settlements.)

=== Adjacent townships ===
- Cass Township (north)
- Stockton Township, Greene County (northeast)
- Stafford Township, Greene County (east)
- Vigo Township, Knox County (south)
- Widner Township, Knox County (southwest)
- Haddon Township (west)

=== Cemeteries ===
The township contains six cemeteries: Hale, McDade, Pirtle, Posey, Smith and Woodward.

=== Lakes ===
- Motorboat Lake
- Red Lake
- South Lake
- T Lake
- Twin Lake

== School districts ==
- Northeast School Corporation
