= Fairbanks Township, Sullivan County, Indiana =

Fairbanks Township
- Township
- Location in Sullivan County
- Coordinates: 39°12′36″N 87°31′50″W
- Country: United States
- State: Indiana
- County: Sullivan

Government
  - Type: Indiana township

Area
  - Total: 41.51 sq mi (107.5 km^{2})
  - Land: 41 sq mi (110 km^{2})
  - Water: 0.52 sq mi (1.3 km^{2}) 1.25%
- Elevation: 561 ft (171 m)

Population (2020)
  - Total: 721
  - Density: 18/sq mi (6.8/km^{2})
- ZIP codes: 47849, 47850, 47861, 47879
- GNIS feature ID: 453283

Fairbanks Township is one of nine townships in Sullivan County, Indiana, United States. As of the 2020 census, its population was 721 and it contained 318 housing units.

Historical population
Census	Pop.	Note	%±
1890	1,258		—
1900	1,348		7.2%
1910	1,206		−10.5%
1920	1,131		−6.2%
1930	978		−13.5%
1940	1,012		3.5%
1950	804		−20.6%
1960	879		9.3%
1970	699		−20.5%
1980	864		23.6%
1990	655		−24.2%
2000	728		11.1%
2010	733		0.7%
2020	721		−1.6%
Source: US Decennial Census

== History ==
Fairbanks Township was named for one General Fairbanks.

== Geography ==
According to the 2010 census, the township has a total area of 41.51 square miles (107.5 km^{2}), of which 41 square miles (110 km^{2}) (or 98.77%) is land and 0.52 square miles (1.3 km^{2}) (or 1.25%) is water.

=== Unincorporated towns ===
- Fairbanks at 39.219484°N 87.522245°W
- Riverview at 39.200318°N 87.583635°W
- Scott City at 39.193929°N 87.465021°W

(This list is based on USGS data and may include former settlements.)

=== Adjacent townships ===
- Prairie Creek Township, Vigo County (north)
- Linton Township, Vigo County (northeast)
- Curry Township (east)
- Hamilton Township (southeast)
- Turman Township (south)
- York Township, Clark County, Illinois (west)
- Darwin Township, Clark County, Illinois (northwest)

=== Cemeteries ===
The township contains these four cemeteries: Chowning, DeBaun, Pogue and Riggs-Ernest.

=== Airports and landing strips ===
- Roll-N-Ridge Airport

== School districts ==
- Northeast School Corporation

== Political districts ==
- Indiana's 8th congressional district
- State House District 45
- State Senate District 39
