= Riverton, Indiana =

- Unincorporated community
- Sullivan County's location in Indiana

- Sullivan County, Indiana
- Coordinates: 39°01′13″N 87°34′04″W
- Country: United States
- State: Indiana
- County: Sullivan
- Township: Gill
- Elevation: 436 ft (133 m)
- Time zone: UTC-5 (Eastern (EST))
  - Summer (DST): UTC-4 (EDT)
- ZIP code: 47861
- Area codes: 812, 930
- FIPS code: 18-64872
- GNIS feature ID: 442104

Riverton is an unincorporated community in Gill Township, Sullivan County, in the U.S. state of Indiana.

The community is part of the Terre Haute Metropolitan Statistical Area.

== History ==
Riverton was laid out in 1887, and was named after its location on the Wabash River. A post office was established at Riverton in 1887, and remained in operation until it was discontinued in 1905.
