= Sullivan County, Indiana =

County in Indiana, United States

- County
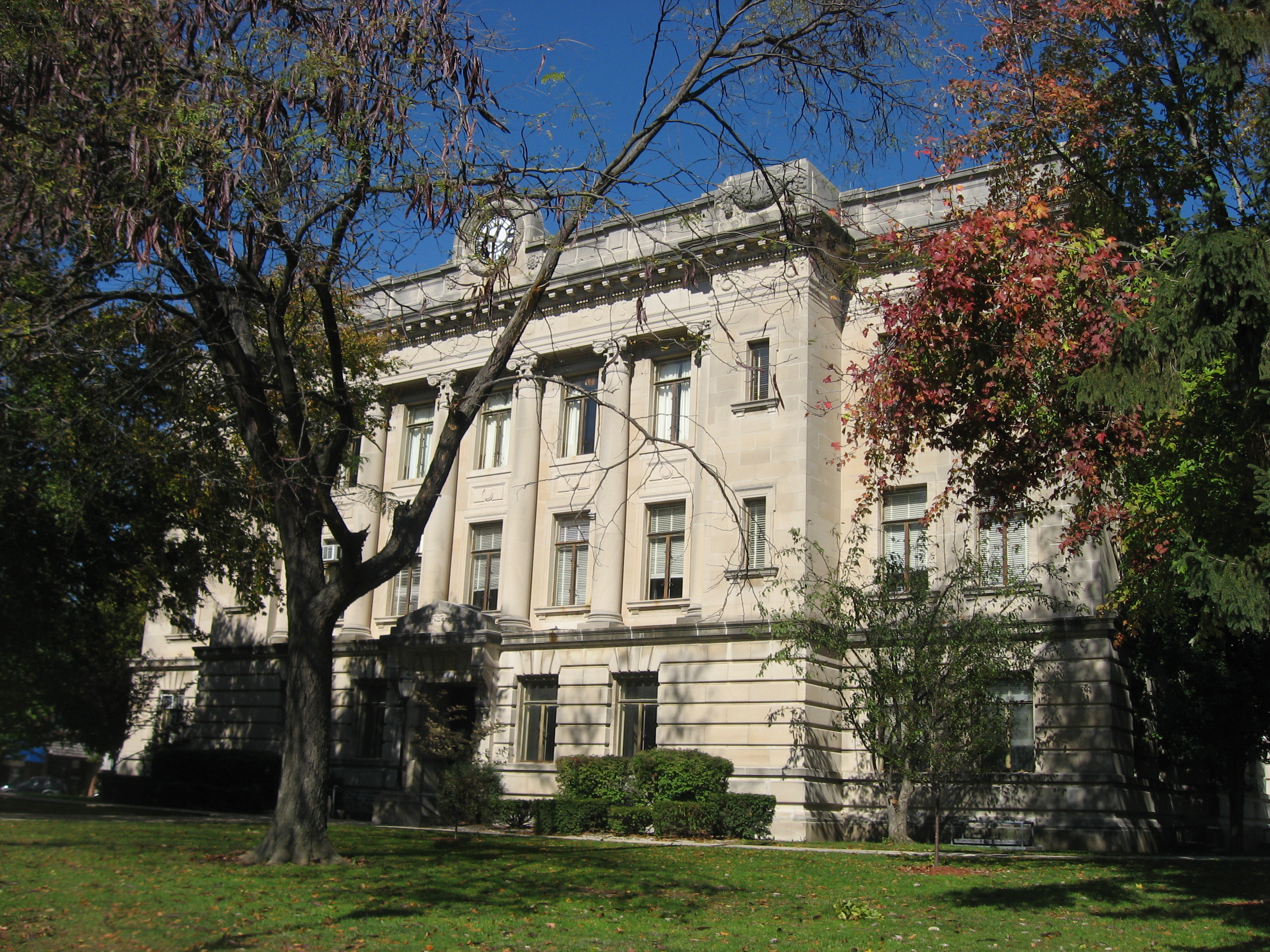
- Sullivan County Courthouse

- Location within the U.S. state of Indiana
- Coordinates: 39°05′N 87°25′W
- Country: United States
- State: Indiana
- Founded: January 15, 1817 (created); February 1817 (organized)
- Named for: General Daniel Sullivan
- Seat: Sullivan
- Largest city: Sullivan

Area
  - Total: 454.12 sq mi (1,176.2 km^{2})
  - Land: 447.14 sq mi (1,158.1 km^{2})
  - Water: 6.97 sq mi (18.1 km^{2}) 1.53%

Population (2020)
  - Total: 20,817
  - Estimate (2025): 20,831 ▲
  - Density: 46.556/sq mi (17.975/km^{2})
- Time zone: UTC−5 (Eastern)
  - Summer (DST): UTC−4 (EDT)
- Congressional district: 8th
- Website: www.sullivancounty.in.gov
- Indiana county number 77

Sullivan County is a county in the U.S. state of Indiana, and determined by the US Census Bureau to include the mean center of U.S. population in 1940. As of 2023, the population was estimated at 20,757. The county seat (and the county's only incorporated city) is Sullivan. Sullivan County is included in the Terre Haute metropolitan area.

== History ==
On February 25, 1779, Col. George Rogers Clark captured Fort Sackville at Vincennes from the British. About six miles (9.7 km) west at Pointe Coupee on the Wabash River on March 2, 1779, Capt. Leonard Helm commanding three boats and 50 volunteers from Vincennes captured a reinforcement fleet of seven boats carrying 40 soldiers and valuable supplies and Indian trade goods. This small naval battle completed the destruction of British military strength in the Wabash Valley.

The county's first settlement occurred between 1808 and 1812, by a religious society of celibates known as Shakers. The 400 members of this communal group occupied 1,300 acres (5 km^{2}), seven miles (11 km) west of Carlisle.

General William Henry Harrison’s army made its last camp in Sullivan County at Big Springs on September 29, 1811. Harrison used Benjamin Turman's fort as his headquarters. With spring water available, it was an ideal location for 1000 men, including 160 dragoons and 60 mounted riflemen. A Kentucky soldier killed a fellow Kentuckian, Clark, either accidentally or in a grudge fight. The deceased was buried at the top of a hill that became the Mann Turman Cemetery. General Harrison and his troops continued north on the Wea Indiana Trail to build Fort Harrison and then proceeded to the Battle of Tippecanoe.

A War of 1812 military action occurred in September 1812, three miles (4.8 km) west−southwest of Sullivan County. While escorting supplies from Fort Knox near Vincennes to Fort Harrison at Terre Haute, Sergeant Nathan Fairbanks and approximately a dozen soldiers were ambushed - and most killed - by Indians.

In 1815, Carlisle was founded.

An act of the Indiana legislature dated December 30, 1816, created Sullivan County, with areas partitioned from Knox County. The effective date of the new government was January 15, 1817, with interim commissioners charged to begin organizing the new government in February. It was named for Daniel Sullivan, a prominent frontiersman killed in 1790 by Native Americans while carrying a dispatch between Fort Vincennes and Louisville.

A log courthouse in Merom served as Sullivan County's first county seat from 1819 to 1842. Merom was an important river port and a stop on the stage route known as The Old Harrison Trail. William Henry Harrison's troops camped near here on their 1811 march to the Battle of Tippecanoe.

Pioneer heroine of abdominal surgery Jane Todd is buried in Sullivan County. Born in Virginia in 1763, she and her husband, Thomas Crawford, moved to Green County, Kentucky, in 1805. Suffering from a huge abdominal tumor, she rode 60 miles (100 km) to Danville, Kentucky, to submit to a never-before-performed surgical procedure. On Christmas Day 1809, Dr. Ephraim McDowell performed the first ovariotomy, in his home. The ordeal lasted 25 minutes. There was no anesthesia. Mrs. Crawford recovered completely and years later came to Graysville to live with her son, Thomas, a Presbyterian minister. She died in 1842 at age 78. The restored McDowell home in Danville, Kentucky, is a surgical shrine.

Sullivan was founded in 1853 and became the county seat.

Dedicated in 1862, Union Christian College served as a preparatory school and college until 1924. In 1936 it became Merom Institute—a rural enrichment center. Now owned by the United Church of Christ, it serves as a camp, conference, and retreat center.

Numerous violent conflicts erupted in Sullivan County during the American Civil War over differing war sentiments. On July 14, 1864, anti-war Democrat John Drake was fatally shot at a community picnic near here.

In November 1902, a mob abducted James Dillard from the Sullivan County sheriff, John S. Dudley, as he was being taken to Sullivan. After kidnapping Dillard, they lynched him. In response to the lynching, Governor Winfield Durbin dismissed the sheriff - a decision which was in line with Indiana's 1899 anti-lynching law. However, Sheriff Dudley ultimately remained in office after he and other officials entered into a legal battle about the decision.

Organized nationally to bring culture to rural communities, Merom's 10-day religious and educational Chautauqua event featured concerts, debates, plays, and lectures. Carrie Nation, William Jennings Bryan, William Howard Taft, Warren G. Harding, and Billy Sunday were among its speakers.

On February 20, 1925, an explosion occurred at the Sullivan City Mine, killing 51.

In 1968, the Sullivan County Park and Lake was created. It contains a 468-acre (1.9 km^{2}) reservoir for swimming, boating, and fishing. The lake is stocked with crappie, hybrid saugeye, bass, bluegill, and channel catfish. Water skiing is popular. Sullivan County Park and Lake has 400 acres (1.6 km^{2}) of land for camping and a 9-hole golf course. The campground offers sites ranging from primitive camping to space for motor homes.

== Geography ==
Sullivan County lies on the west edge of Indiana; its western border abuts the state of Illinois (across the Wabash River). The meanders of the Wabash delineate the county's west border. The upper part of the county is drained by Turtle Creek, which flows southwestward into the river. The lower part of the county is similarly drained by Busseron Creek.

The county's abundant woods were largely cleared and devoted to agriculture during the nineteenth century. At present only the drainages remain wooded. Its highest point (640 feet/200 meters ASL) is a small rise six miles (9.7 km) east of Carlisle.

According to the 2010 census, the county has a total area of 454.12 square miles (1,176.2 km^{2}), of which 447.14 square miles (1,158.1 km^{2}) (or 98.46%) is land and 6.97 square miles (18.1 km^{2}) (or 1.53%) is water.

=== Adjacent counties ===
- Vigo County − north
- Clay County − northeast
- Greene County − east
- Knox County − south
- Crawford County, Illinois − west
- Clark County, Illinois − northwest

=== Protected areas ===
- Busseron Creek Fish & Wildlife Area
- Elliott Woods State Nature Preserve
- Greene-Sullivan State Forest (part)
- Redbird State Recreation Area (part)
- Shakamak State Park (part)
- Sullivan County Park and Lake
- Turtle Creek Reservoir

=== City ===
- Sullivan - county seat

=== Towns ===
- Carlisle
- Dugger
- Farmersburg
- Hymera
- Merom
- Shelburn

=== Unincorporated communities ===
- Baker
- Baldridge
- Bucktown
- Cass
- Curryville
- Dodds Bridge
- East Shelburn
- Fairbanks
- Gambill
- Gilmour − part
- Graysville
- Jackson Hill
- Lewis − part
- Merom Station
- New Lebanon
- Paxton
- Pleasantville
- Riverton
- Riverview
- Scotchtown
- Scott City
- Shiloh
- Standard
- Wilfred

=== Ghost towns ===
- Caledonia
- Farnsworth

=== Townships ===
- Cass
- Curry
- Fairbanks
- Gill
- Haddon
- Hamilton
- Jackson
- Jefferson
- Turman

== Transportation ==
=== Major highways ===
- U.S. Route 41
- U.S. Route 150
- State Road 48
- State Road 54
- State Road 58
- State Road 63
- State Road 154
- State Road 159

=== Airport ===
The county contains one public-use airport, the Sullivan County Airport (SIV) at Sullivan.

== Economy ==
Peabody Energy Corporation The Bear Run mine is the largest surface mine in the eastern U.S. and was expected to produce 12 million tons of coal per year. The mine employed 500 employees in 2012. However, as national coal demand declined, its production was cut back (to 7.2 million tons in 2016 and 2017, to 6.8 in 2018), and in November 2019 there were further reductions and layoffs.

== Education ==
Sullivan County is served by two school corporations, the Southwest School Corporation and the Northeast School Corporation. The former's high school is Sullivan High School in Sullivan, and the latter's high schools are North Central High School in Farmersburg and Union High School in Dugger. Union Christian College formerly operated in Merom.

== Climate and weather ==
Sullivan, Indiana

Climate chart (precipitation, max. and min. temperature)
J	F	M	A	M	J	J	A	S	O	N	D
2.8 36 18	2.6 42 22	3.2 52 31	4.2 64 42	4.1 73 52	3.5 82 61	4.7 85 65	3.8 84 63	3.7 78 56	3 67 44	4.1 53 34	3 40 23
- █ Average max. and min. temperatures in °F
- █ Precipitation totals in inches
- Source: The Weather Channel
Metric conversion
J	F	M	A	M	J	J	A	S	O	N	D
71 2 −8	66 6 −6	82 11 −1	107 18 6	104 23 11	90 28 16	119 29 18	97 29 17	94 26 13	77 19 7	104 12 1	77 4 −5
- █ Average max. and min. temperatures in °C
- █ Precipitation totals in mm

In recent years, average temperatures in Sullivan have ranged from a low of 18 °F (−8 °C) in January to a high of 85 °F (29 °C) in July, although a record low of −33 °F (−36 °C) was recorded in January 1994 and a record high of 98 °F (37 °C) was recorded in July 1999. Average monthly precipitation ranged from 2.58 inches (66 mm) in February to 4.69 inches (119 mm) in July.

== Government ==
The county government is a constitutional body, and is granted specific powers by the Constitution of Indiana, and by the Indiana Code.

County Council: The legislative branch of the county government; controls spending and revenue collection in the county. Representatives are elected to four-year terms from county districts. They set salaries, the annual budget, and special spending. The council has limited authority to impose local taxes, in the form of an income and property tax that is subject to state level approval, excise taxes, and service taxes.

Board of Commissioners: The executive body of the county; commissioners are elected county-wide to staggered four-year terms. One commissioner serves as president. The commissioners execute acts legislated by the council, collect revenue, and manage the county government.

Court: The county maintains a small claims court that handles civil cases. The judge on the court is elected to a term of four years and must be a member of the Indiana Bar Association. The judge is assisted by a constable who is also elected to a four-year term. In some cases, court decisions can be appealed to the state level circuit court.

County Officials: The county has other elected offices, including sheriff, coroner, auditor, treasurer, recorder, surveyor, and circuit court clerk. These officers are elected to four-year terms. Members elected to county government positions are required to declare party affiliations and to be residents of the county.

United States presidential election results for Sullivan County, Indiana
Year	Republican		Democratic		Third party(ies)	
Year	No.	%	No.	%	No.	%
1888	1,902	35.56%	3,382	63.24%	64	1.20%
1892	1,784	32.66%	3,159	57.84%	519	9.50%
1896	2,317	36.15%	4,010	62.57%	82	1.28%
1900	2,326	35.29%	4,008	60.81%	257	3.90%
1904	3,076	42.17%	3,641	49.91%	578	7.92%
1908	2,942	35.67%	4,657	56.46%	649	7.87%
1912	1,406	18.52%	3,707	48.82%	2,480	32.66%
1916	2,630	35.24%	3,880	51.99%	953	12.77%
1920	5,376	41.38%	6,160	47.42%	1,455	11.20%
1924	5,139	42.64%	5,213	43.25%	1,701	14.11%
1928	6,199	51.09%	5,642	46.50%	293	2.41%
1932	3,667	29.39%	7,835	62.80%	975	7.81%
1936	4,685	30.92%	10,203	67.33%	266	1.76%
1940	6,471	42.32%	8,667	56.69%	151	0.99%
1944	5,855	47.23%	6,420	51.79%	122	0.98%
1948	4,824	40.88%	6,705	56.82%	272	2.30%
1952	5,929	45.65%	6,964	53.62%	95	0.73%
1956	5,829	48.79%	6,048	50.63%	69	0.58%
1960	6,012	49.85%	5,975	49.54%	73	0.61%
1964	3,867	34.34%	7,351	65.28%	42	0.37%
1968	4,266	43.20%	4,453	45.10%	1,155	11.70%
1972	5,338	59.30%	3,624	40.26%	39	0.43%
1976	3,747	41.61%	5,198	57.72%	61	0.68%
1980	4,465	49.05%	4,335	47.62%	303	3.33%
1984	4,771	54.14%	4,006	45.46%	36	0.41%
1988	4,246	49.39%	4,320	50.25%	31	0.36%
1992	3,052	33.29%	4,211	45.93%	1,905	20.78%
1996	3,207	37.11%	4,076	47.17%	1,359	15.73%
2000	4,319	52.28%	3,833	46.39%	110	1.33%
2004	4,999	59.55%	3,341	39.80%	54	0.64%
2008	4,343	49.45%	4,284	48.78%	155	1.76%
2012	4,902	59.13%	3,191	38.49%	197	2.38%
2016	6,138	71.26%	2,113	24.53%	362	4.20%
2020	6,691	74.28%	2,153	23.90%	164	1.82%
2024	6,639	75.49%	2,006	22.81%	150	1.71%

== Demographics ==
Historical population
Census	Pop.	Note	%±
1820	3,498		—
1830	4,630		32.4%
1840	8,315		79.6%
1850	10,141		22.0%
1860	15,064		48.5%
1870	18,453		22.5%
1880	20,336		10.2%
1890	21,877		7.6%
1900	26,005		18.9%
1910	32,439		24.7%
1920	31,630		−2.5%
1930	28,133		−11.1%
1940	27,014		−4.0%
1950	23,667		−12.4%
1960	21,721		−8.2%
1970	19,889		−8.4%
1980	21,107		6.1%
1990	18,993		−10.0%
2000	21,751		14.5%
2010	21,475		−1.3%
2020	20,817		−3.1%
2025 (est.)	20,831	▲	0.1%
US Decennial Census; 1790-1960 1900-1990; 1990-2000 2010-2021

=== Racial and ethnic composition ===
Sullivan County, Indiana – Racial and ethnic composition Note: the US Census treats Hispanic/Latino as an ethnic category. This table excludes Latinos from the racial categories and assigns them to a separate category. Hispanics/Latinos may be of any race.
Race / Ethnicity (NH = Non-Hispanic)	Pop 1980	Pop 1990	Pop 2000	Pop 2010	Pop 2020	% 1980	% 1990	% 2000	% 2010	% 2020
White alone (NH)	20,983	18,864	20,380	19,930	18,856	99.41%	99.32%	93.70%	92.81%	90.58%
Black or African American alone (NH)	22	15	928	946	877	0.10%	0.08%	4.27%	4.41%	4.21%
Native American or Alaska Native alone (NH)	25	36	54	53	43	0.12%	0.19%	0.25%	0.25%	0.21%
Asian alone (NH)	15	15	29	39	33	0.07%	0.08%	0.13%	0.18%	0.16%
Native Hawaiian or Pacific Islander alone (NH)	x	x	0	1	8	x	x	0.00%	0.00%	0.04%
Other race alone (NH)	4	4	12	11	28	0.02%	0.02%	0.06%	0.05%	0.13%
Mixed race or Multiracial (NH)	x	x	169	201	638	x	x	0.78%	0.94%	3.06%
Hispanic or Latino (any race)	58	59	179	294	334	0.27%	0.31%	0.82%	1.37%	1.60%
Total	21,107	18,993	21,751	21,475	20,817	100.00%	100.00%	100.00%	100.00%	100.00%

=== 2020 census ===
As of the 2020 census, the county had a population of 20,817. The median age was 42.1 years. 20.3% of residents were under the age of 18 and 18.8% of residents were 65 years of age or older. For every 100 females there were 121.9 males, and for every 100 females age 18 and over there were 124.8 males age 18 and over.

The racial makeup of the county was 91.1% White, 4.2% Black or African American, 0.2% American Indian and Alaska Native, 0.2% Asian, <0.1% Native Hawaiian and Pacific Islander, 0.8% from some other race, and 3.5% from two or more races. Hispanic or Latino residents of any race comprised 1.6% of the population.

23.4% of residents lived in urban areas, while 76.6% lived in rural areas.

There were 7,727 households in the county, of which 29.2% had children under the age of 18 living in them. Of all households, 49.9% were married-couple households, 18.7% were households with a male householder and no spouse or partner present, and 24.4% were households with a female householder and no spouse or partner present. About 28.9% of all households were made up of individuals and 14.1% had someone living alone who was 65 years of age or older.

There were 8,788 housing units, of which 12.1% were vacant. Among occupied housing units, 75.3% were owner-occupied and 24.7% were renter-occupied. The homeowner vacancy rate was 1.8% and the rental vacancy rate was 9.5%.

=== 2010 census ===
As of the 2010 United States census, there were 21,475 people, 7,823 households, and 5,422 families in the county. The population density was 48.0 inhabitants per square mile (18.5/km^{2}). There were 8,939 housing units at an average density of 20.0 per square mile (7.7/km^{2}). The racial makeup of the county was 93.7% white, 4.5% black or African American, 0.3% American Indian, 0.2% Asian, 0.3% from other races, and 1.0% from two or more races. Those of Hispanic or Latino origin made up 1.4% of the population. In terms of ancestry, 20.8% were German, 19.8% were American, 10.3% were Irish, and 9.7% were English.

Of the 7,823 households, 31.7% had children under the age of 18 living with them, 53.4% were married couples living together, 10.8% had a female householder with no husband present, 30.7% were non-families, and 26.7% of all households were made up of individuals. The average household size was 2.45 and the average family size was 2.94. The median age was 39.8 years.

The median income for a household in the county was $47,697 and the median income for a family was $52,558. Males had a median income of $44,645 versus $26,335 for females. The per capita income for the county was $20,093. About 8.5% of families and 11.9% of the population were below the poverty line, including 12.9% of those under age 18 and 11.7% of those age 65 or over.

Turtle Creek Reservoir

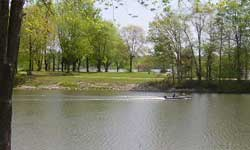
Sullivan County Park & Lake

Sullivan County Farm

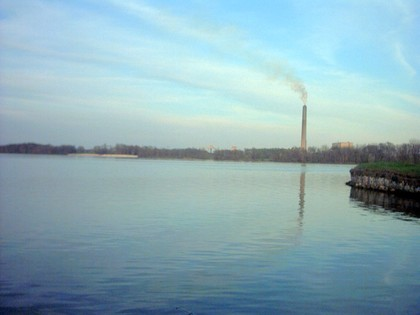
Merom Power Station

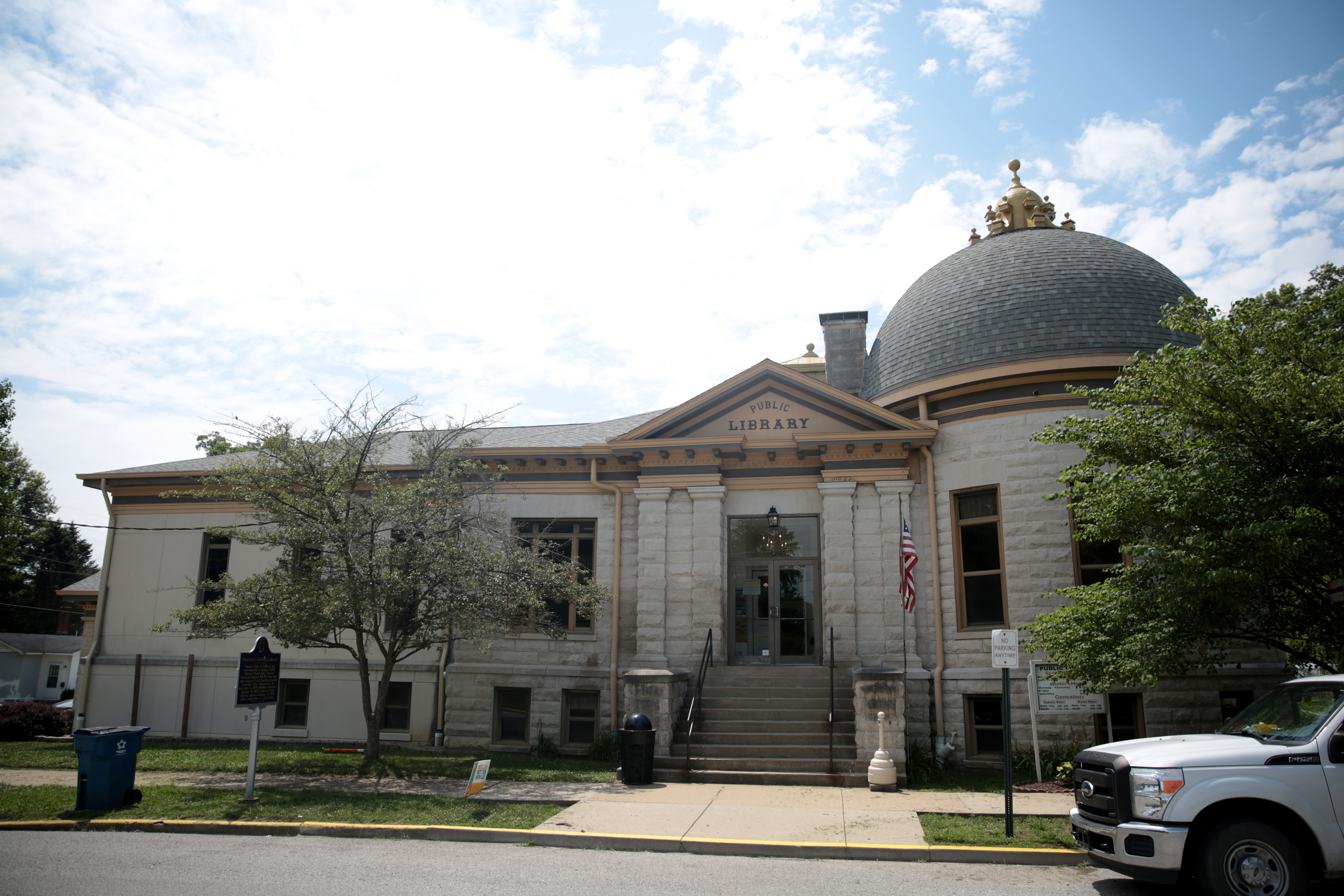
Sullivan Public Library

== See also ==
- National Register of Historic Places listings in Sullivan County, Indiana
