= Dodds Bridge, Indiana =

- Unincorporated community
- Sullivan County's location in Indiana

- Location in Sullivan County, Indiana
- Coordinates: 39°09′26″N 87°31′26″W
- Country: United States
- State: Indiana
- County: Sullivan
- Township: Turman
- Elevation: 463 ft (141 m)
- Time zone: UTC-5 (Eastern (EST))
  - Summer (DST): UTC-4 (EDT)
- ZIP code: 47879
- Area codes: 812, 930
- GNIS feature ID: 433595

Dodds Bridge is an unincorporated community in Turman Township, Sullivan County, in the U.S. state of Indiana.

The community is part of the Terre Haute Metropolitan Statistical Area.

== Geography ==
Dodds Bridge is located at 39°09′26″N 87°31′26″W.
