= Pleasantville, Indiana =

- Unincorporated community
- Sullivan County's location in Indiana

- Sullivan County, Indiana
- Coordinates: 38°58′01″N 87°15′01″W
- Country: United States
- State: Indiana
- County: Sullivan
- Township: Jefferson
- Elevation: 545 ft (166 m)
- Time zone: UTC-5 (Eastern (EST))
  - Summer (DST): UTC-4 (EDT)
- ZIP code: 47838
- Area codes: 812, 930
- FIPS code: 18-60732
- GNIS feature ID: 441356

Pleasantville is an unincorporated community in Jefferson Township, Sullivan County, in the U.S. state of Indiana.

The community is part of the Terre Haute Metropolitan Statistical Area.

== History ==
A post office was established at Pleasantville in 1865, and remained in operation until it was discontinued in 1964.

== Geography ==
Pleasantville is located at 38°58′01″N 87°15′01″W.

=== Demographics ===
The United States Census Bureau defined Pleasantville as a census designated place in the 2022 American Community Survey.

== Education ==
Pleasantville's high school, built in 1916, closed in 1965 when it was consolidated into Union High School in nearby Dugger. However, the high school gym, constructed in 1954, is still used by the community. It hosted a Union High School basketball game in the 2014–15 season, with the Union team wearing Pleasantvllle Blue Streak uniforms.
