= Gambrell =

Gambrell is a surname. Notable people with the surname include:

- Billy Gambrell (born 1941), American football player
- David H. Gambrell (1929–2021), American politician
- Dorothy Gambrell (fl. 1999), American cartoonist who writes and draws the online comic strip Cat and Girl
- Dylan Gambrell (born 1996), American ice hockey player
- James Bruton Gambrell (1841–1921), American Baptist minister
- Jamey Gambrell (1954–2020), American translator of Russian literature, and expert in modern art
- Marilyn Gambrell (fl. 1993), American parole officer turned teacher
- Michael Gambrell (born 1958), American politician

== See also ==
- Gambrill, another surname
