= Merom Station, Indiana =

- Unincorporated community
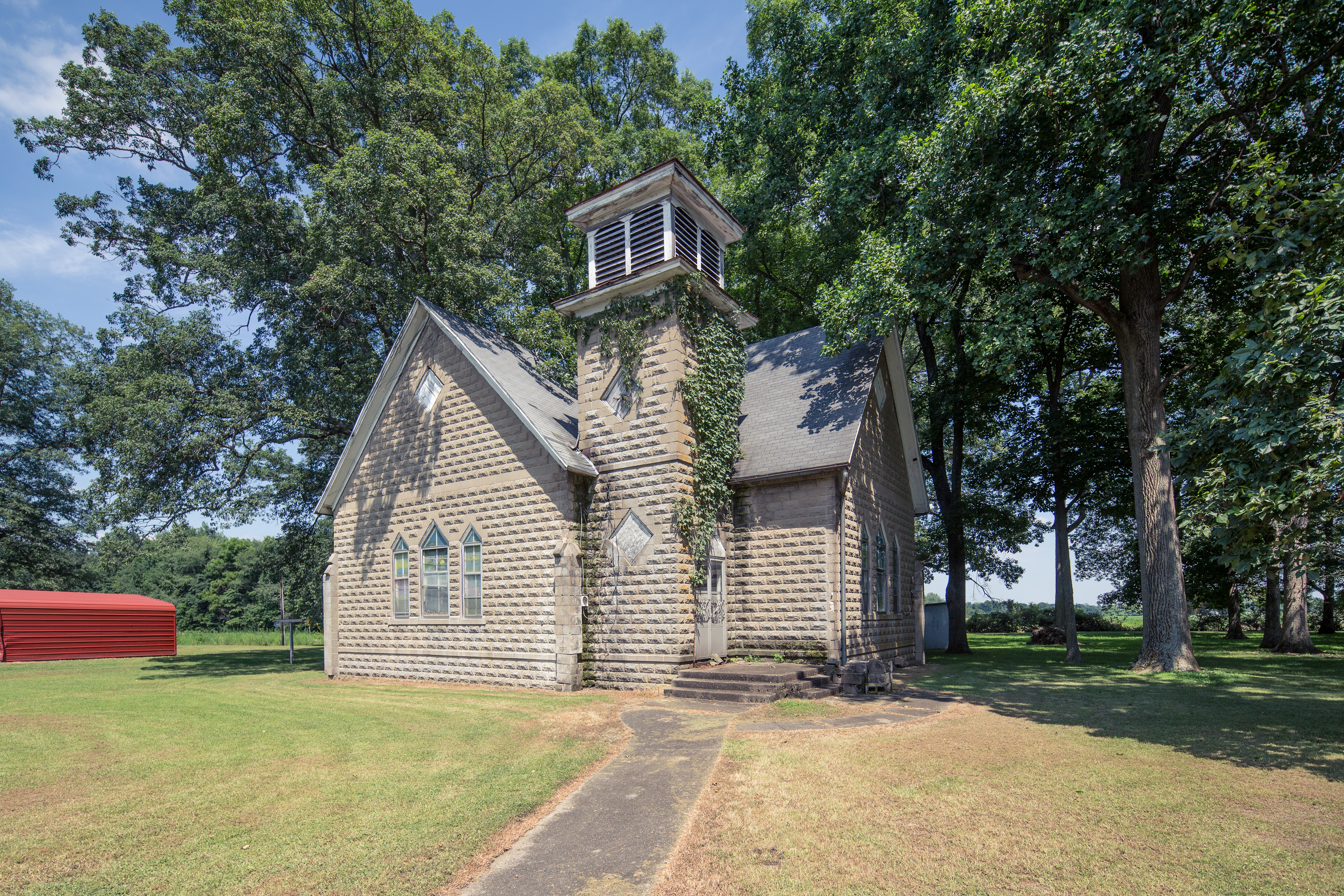

- Sullivan County's location in Indiana

- Location in Sullivan County, Indiana
- Coordinates: 39°01′49″N 87°32′23″W
- Country: United States
- State: Indiana
- County: Sullivan
- Township: Gill
- Elevation: 440 ft (134 m)
- Time zone: UTC-5 (Eastern (EST))
  - Summer (DST): UTC-4 (EDT)
- ZIP code: 47861
- Area codes: 812, 930
- GNIS feature ID: 452064

Merom Station is an unincorporated community in Gill Township, Sullivan County, in the U.S. state of Indiana.

The community is part of the Terre Haute Metropolitan Statistical Area.
