= Sullivan County Airport =

- IATA: SIV; ICAO: KSIV; FAA LID: SIV

Summary
- Airport type: Public
- Owner: Sullivan County BOAC
- Serves: Sullivan, Indiana
- Elevation AMSL: 539 ft / 164 m
- Coordinates: 39°06′53″N 87°26′54″W
- Website: www.sctb.net/new/airport.html

Maps
- Location of Sullivan County in Indiana

- Location of airport in Sullivan County

Runways
Direction	Length		Surface
Direction	ft	m	Surface
18/36	4,359	1,329	Asphalt

Statistics (2019)
- Aircraft operations: 5,366
- Based aircraft: 21
- Source: Federal Aviation Administration

Sullivan County Airport (IATA: SIV, ICAO: KSIV, FAA LID: SIV) is a county-owned public-use airport located three nautical miles (6 km) northwest of the central business district of Sullivan, a city in Sullivan County, Indiana, United States. It is included in the FAA's National Plan of Integrated Airport Systems for 2011–2015, which categorized it as a general aviation facility.

== History ==
The airport was dedicated by Senator Vance Hartke in October 1966.

== Facilities and aircraft ==
Sullivan County Airport covers an area of 108 acres (44 ha) at an elevation of 539 feet (164 m) above mean sea level. It has one asphalt paved runway designated 18/36 which measures 4,359 by 75 feet (1,329 x 23 m).

For the 12-month period ending December 31, 2019, the airport had 5,366 aircraft operations, an average of 103 per week: 97% general aviation and 3% air taxi. At that time there were 21 aircraft based at this airport: 20 single-engine and 1 multi-engine.

== See also ==
- List of airports in Indiana
