= Turman Township, Sullivan County, Indiana =

Turman Township
- Township
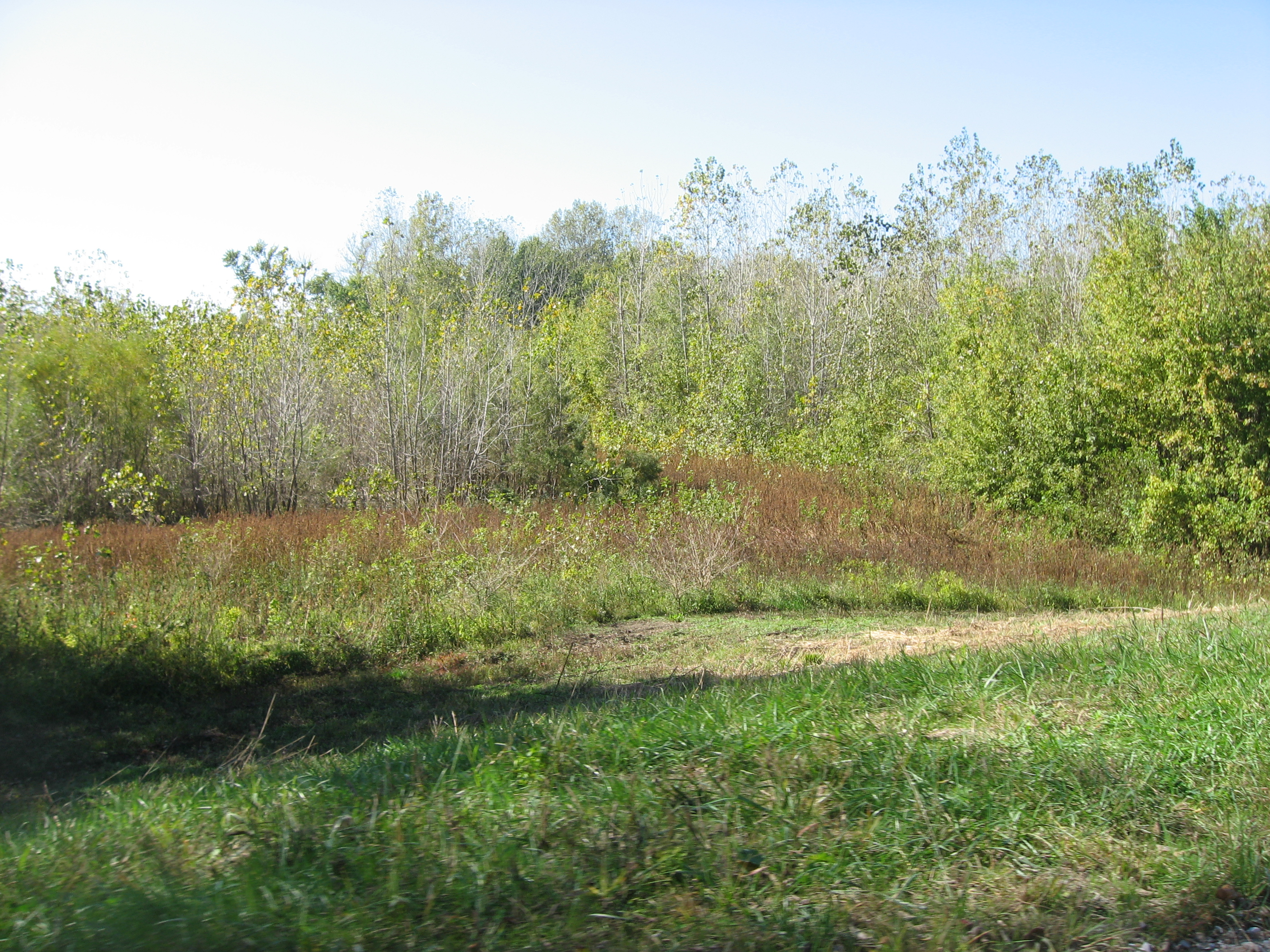
- Countryside along the Wabash River

- Location in Sullivan County
- Coordinates: 39°07′38″N 87°33′11″W
- Country: United States
- State: Indiana
- County: Sullivan

Government
  - Type: Indiana township

Area
  - Total: 57.48 sq mi (148.9 km^{2})
  - Land: 56.8 sq mi (147 km^{2})
  - Water: 0.68 sq mi (1.8 km^{2}) 1.18%
- Elevation: 541 ft (165 m)

Population (2020)
  - Total: 1,037
  - Density: 18.3/sq mi (7.05/km^{2})
- ZIP codes: 47849, 47861, 47879, 47882
- GNIS feature ID: 453905

Turman Township is one of nine townships in Sullivan County, Indiana, United States. As of the 2020 census, its population was 1,037 and it contained 442 housing units.

Historical population
Census	Pop.	Note	%±
1890	1,876		—
1900	1,941		3.5%
1910	1,639		−15.6%
1920	1,542		−5.9%
1930	1,368		−11.3%
1940	1,300		−5.0%
1950	1,094		−15.8%
1960	961		−12.2%
1970	840		−12.6%
1980	964		14.8%
1990	944		−2.1%
2000	1,082		14.6%
2010	1,061		−1.9%
2020	1,037		−2.3%
Source: US Decennial Census

== Geography ==
According to the 2010 census, the township has a total area of 57.48 square miles (148.9 km^{2}), of which 56.8 square miles (147 km^{2}) (or 98.82%) is land and 0.68 square miles (1.8 km^{2}) (or 1.18%) is water.

=== Unincorporated towns ===
- Dodds Bridge at 39.157263°N 87.523912°W
- Graysville at 39.117541°N 87.556134°W

(This list is based on USGS data and may include former settlements.)

=== Adjacent townships ===
- Fairbanks Township (north)
- Curry Township (northeast)
- Hamilton Township (east)
- Gill Township (southeast)
- Hutsonville Township, Crawford County, Illinois (west)
- York Township, Clark County, Illinois (northwest)

=== Cemeteries ===
The township contains these seven cemeteries: Alkire, Burton, Island, Johnson, Mann, Poplar and Mt. Tabor.

=== Rivers ===
- Wabash River

== School districts ==
- Southwest School Corporation
- Rural Community School Corporation

== Political districts ==
- Indiana's 8th congressional district
- State House District 45
- State Senate District 39
