= Scott City, Indiana =

- Unincorporated community
- Sullivan County's location in Indiana

- Sullivan County, Indiana
- Coordinates: 39°11′38″N 87°27′54″W
- Country: United States
- State: Indiana
- County: Sullivan
- Township: Fairbanks
- Elevation: 528 ft (161 m)
- Time zone: UTC-5 (Eastern (EST))
  - Summer (DST): UTC-4 (EDT)
- ZIP code: 47879
- Area codes: 812, 930
- FIPS code: 18-68490
- GNIS feature ID: 443144

Scott City is an unincorporated community in Fairbanks Township, Sullivan County, in the U.S. state of Indiana.

The community is part of the Terre Haute Metropolitan Statistical Area.
