= Graysville, Indiana =

- Unincorporated community
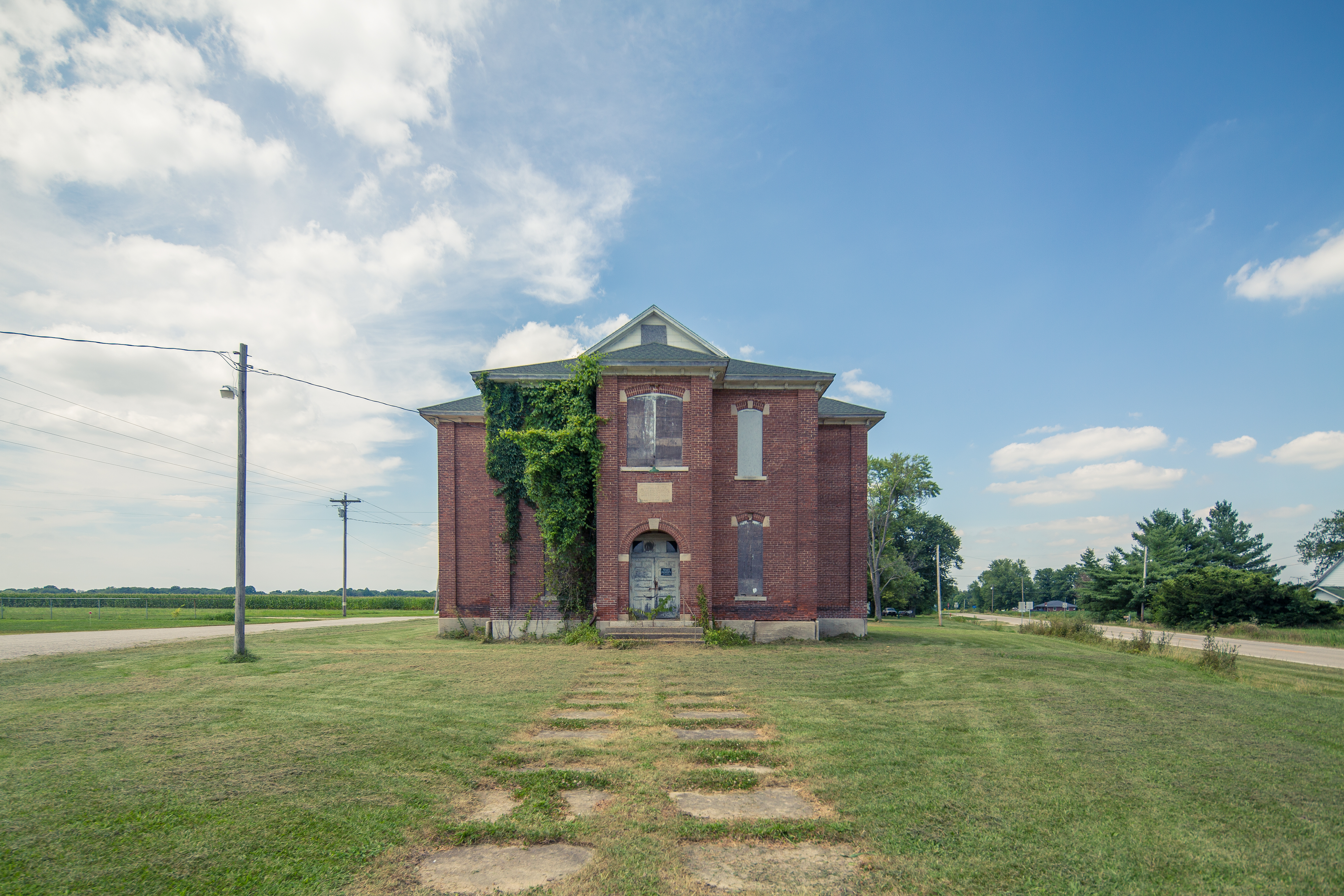

- Sullivan County's location in Indiana

- Sullivan County, Indiana
- Coordinates: 39°07′03″N 87°33′22″W
- Country: United States
- State: Indiana
- County: Sullivan
- Township: Turman
- Elevation: 568 ft (173 m)
- Time zone: UTC-5 (Eastern (EST))
  - Summer (DST): UTC-4 (EDT)
- ZIP code: 47882
- Area codes: 812, 930
- FIPS code: 18-29106
- GNIS feature ID: 435374

Graysville is an unincorporated community in Turman Township, Sullivan County, in the U.S. state of Indiana.

The community is part of the Terre Haute Metropolitan Statistical Area.

== History ==
Graysville was named after its founder, Joe Gray. The post office at Graysville has been in operation since 1849.

== Geography ==
Graysville is located at 39°07′03″N 87°33′22″W.

== Demographics ==
The United States Census Bureau delineated Graysville as a census designated place in the 2022 American Community Survey.
