= Gill Township, Indiana =

Gill Township
- Township
- Location in Sullivan County
- Coordinates: 39°01′23″N 87°30′14″W
- Country: United States
- State: Indiana
- County: Sullivan

Government
  - Type: Indiana township

Area
  - Total: 61.08 sq mi (158.2 km^{2})
  - Land: 60.11 sq mi (155.7 km^{2})
  - Water: 0.97 sq mi (2.5 km^{2}) 1.59%
- Elevation: 469 ft (143 m)

Population (2020)
  - Total: 823
  - Density: 13.7/sq mi (5.29/km^{2})
- ZIP codes: 47838, 47861, 47882
- GNIS feature ID: 453331

Gill Township is one of nine townships in Sullivan County, Indiana, United States. As of the 2020 census, its population was 823 and it contained 361 housing units.

Historical population
Census	Pop.	Note	%±
1890	2,272		—
1900	2,598		14.3%
1910	2,482		−4.5%
1920	2,127		−14.3%
1930	1,869		−12.1%
1940	1,772		−5.2%
1950	1,513		−14.6%
1960	1,328		−12.2%
1970	1,083		−18.4%
1980	1,089		0.6%
1990	959		−11.9%
2000	965		0.6%
2010	871		−9.7%
2020	823		−5.5%
Source: US Decennial Census

== Geography ==
According to the 2010 census, the township has a total area of 61.08 square miles (158.2 km^{2}), of which 60.11 square miles (155.7 km^{2}) (or 98.41%) is land and 0.97 square miles (2.5 km^{2}) (or 1.59%) is water.

=== Cities, towns, villages ===
- Merom

=== Unincorporated towns ===
- Merom Station at 39.030320°N 87.539745°W
- New Lebanon at 39.040876°N 87.471132°W
- Riverton at 39.020320°N 87.567801°W

(This list is based on USGS data and may include former settlements.)

=== Adjacent townships ===
- Hamilton Township (northeast)
- Haddon Township (southeast)
- Montgomery Township, Crawford County, Illinois (southwest)
- Lamotte Township, Crawford County, Illinois (west)
- Hutsonville Township, Crawford County, Illinois (northwest)
- Turman Township (northwest)

=== Cemeteries ===
The township contains these eleven cemeteries: Bennett, Burnett, Hollenback, Massey, Milam, Mount Zion, Old French, Parson, Pirtle, South and Webb.

=== Airports and landing strips ===
- Mann Airport

== School districts ==
- Southwest School Corporation

== Political districts ==
- Indiana's 8th congressional district
- State House District 45
- State Senate District 39
