= Scotchtown, Indiana =

- Unincorporated community
- Sullivan County's location in Indiana

- Location in Sullivan County, Indiana
- Coordinates: 39°04′30″N 87°17′52″W
- Country: United States
- State: Indiana
- County: Sullivan
- Township: Cass
- Elevation: 509 ft (155 m)
- Time zone: UTC-5 (Eastern (EST))
  - Summer (DST): UTC-4 (EDT)
- ZIP code: 47882
- Area codes: 812, 930
- GNIS feature ID: 443133

Scotchtown is an unincorporated community in Cass Township, Sullivan County, in the U.S. state of Indiana.

The community is part of the Terre Haute Metropolitan Statistical Area.

== Geography ==
Scotchtown is located at 39°04′30″N 87°17′52″W.
