= Jackson Hill (Missouri) =

Hill in Missouri, U.S.

Coordinates: 37°09′15″N 89°28′24″W

Jackson Hill is a summit in Scott County in the U.S. state of Missouri. The summit has an elevation of 594 feet (181 m).

Jackson Hill is named after the Jackson family, the original owners of the site.
