= Cass Township, Sullivan County, Indiana =

Cass Township
- Township
- Location in Sullivan County
- Coordinates: 39°05′07″N 87°17′40″W
- Country: United States
- State: Indiana
- County: Sullivan

Government
  - Type: Indiana township

Area
  - Total: 39.46 sq mi (102.2 km^{2})
  - Land: 37.8 sq mi (98 km^{2})
  - Water: 1.67 sq mi (4.3 km^{2}) 4.23%
- Elevation: 531 ft (162 m)

Population (2020)
  - Total: 1,856
  - Density: 49.1/sq mi (19.0/km^{2})
- ZIP codes: 47438, 47848, 47882
- GNIS feature ID: 453168

Cass Township is one of nine townships in Sullivan County, Indiana, USA. As of the 2020 census, its population was 1,856 and it contained 923 housing units.

Historical population
Census	Pop.	Note	%±
1890	2,356		—
1900	2,819		19.7%
1910	4,759		68.8%
1920	5,488		15.3%
1930	4,304		−21.6%
1940	4,044		−6.0%
1950	3,063		−24.3%
1960	2,443		−20.2%
1970	2,263		−7.4%
1980	2,454		8.4%
1990	1,912		−22.1%
2000	1,932		1.0%
2010	2,074		7.3%
2020	1,856		−10.5%
Source: US Decennial Census

== Geography ==
According to the 2010 census, the township has a total area of 39.46 square miles (102.2 km^{2}), of which 37.8 square miles (98 km^{2}) (or 95.79%) is land and 1.67 square miles (4.3 km^{2}) (or 4.23%) is water.

=== Cities, towns, villages ===
- Dugger

=== Unincorporated towns ===
- Baker at 39.130598°N 87.312517°W
- Cass at 39.086987°N 87.278627°W
- Gambill at 39.048933°N 87.259737°W
- Jericho at 39.061432°N 87.297516°W
- Scotchtown at 39.075043°N 87.297794°W
- Shiloh at 39.038932°N 87.292516°W

(This list is based on USGS data and may include former settlements.)

=== Extinct towns ===
- Caledonia at 39.098931°N 87.335017°W
- Farnsworth at 39.099209°N 87.323628°W

(These towns are listed as "historical" by the USGS.)

=== Adjacent townships ===
- Jackson Township (north)
- Wright Township, Greene County (east)
- Stockton Township, Greene County (southeast)
- Jefferson Township (south)
- Haddon Township (southwest)
- Hamilton Township (west)

=== Cemeteries ===
The township contains these five cemeteries: Burris, Clayton Cemeteries (historical), Deckard, Dugger and Houck.

=== Major highways ===
- Indiana State Road 54

=== Lakes ===
- Greenbriar Lake

== School districts ==
- Northeast School Corporation

== Political districts ==
- Indiana's 8th congressional district
- State House District 45
- State Senate District 39
