= Jackson Hill, Indiana =

- Unincorporated community
- Sullivan County's location in Indiana

- Sullivan County, Indiana
- Coordinates: 39°10′06″N 87°21′43″W
- Country: United States
- State: Indiana
- County: Sullivan
- Township: Hamilton
- Elevation: 545 ft (166 m)
- Time zone: UTC-5 (Eastern (EST))
  - Summer (DST): UTC-4 (EDT)
- ZIP code: 47879
- Area codes: 812, 930
- FIPS code: 18-37602
- GNIS feature ID: 436890

Jackson Hill is an unincorporated community in Hamilton Township, Sullivan County, in the U.S. state of Indiana.

The community is part of the Terre Haute Metropolitan Statistical Area.

== History ==
A post office was established at Jackson Hill in 1900, and remained in operation until it was discontinued in 1906.

== Geography ==
Jackson Hill is located at 39°10′06″N 87°21′43″W.
