= Shelburn station =

- Shelburn Interurban Depot-THI&E Interurban Depot
- U.S. National Register of Historic Places
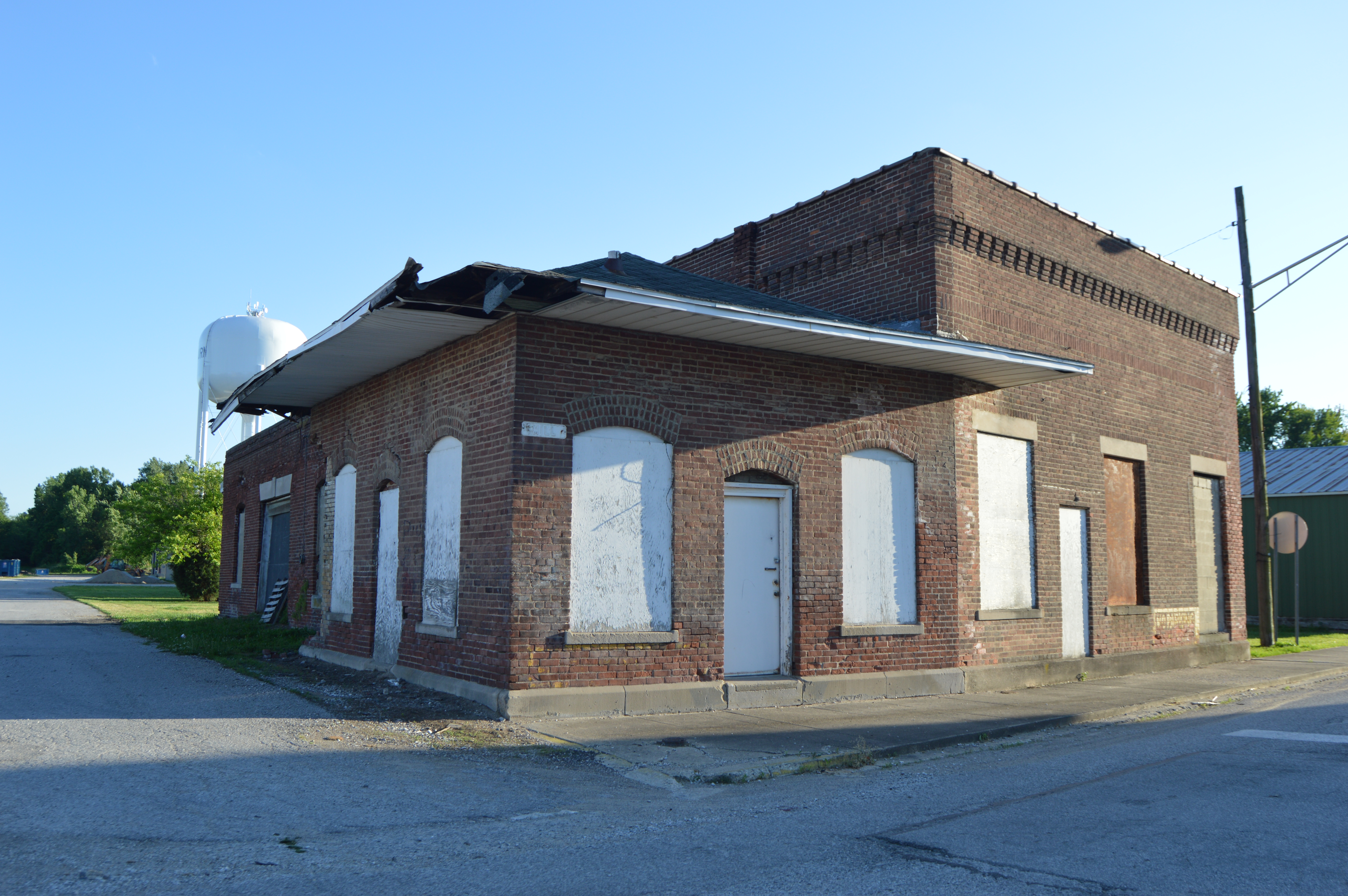
- Shelburn Interurban Depot-THI&E Interurban Depot, June 2016

- Location within USA Indiana Sullivan County Location within Indiana Location within the United States
- Location: 3 N. Railroad St., Shelburn, Indiana
- Coordinates: 39°10′40″N 87°23′39″W
- Area: Less than 1 acre (0.40 ha)
- Built: c. 1911, c. 1916–1920
- NRHP reference No.: 15000890
- Added to NRHP: December 15, 2015

Shelburn Interurban Depot-THI&E Interurban Depot is a historic interurban train station located at Shelburn, Indiana. It was built about 1911 and enlarged between 1916 and 1920. It is a one-story, red brick and limestone building that housed passenger and freight rooms and a substation for the electrical system that powered the interurban cars. It was used for its original purpose until the closure of the interurban line between Terre Haute, Indiana and Sullivan in May 1931.

In 2015, the Town of Shelburn completed a full restoration of the depot exterior. The work included structural repairs, roof replacement and reconstruction, masonry cleaning and restoration, window and door replacement, and the installation of a new electrical service. Restoration work was completed by Keymark (Terre Haute, IN) to preservation plans provided by RATIO Architects (Indianapolis, IN).

It was listed on the National Register of Historic Places in 2015.

The Town completed the interior and exterior restoration and rehabilitation of the building in 2019 and is currently marketing the building for reuse as a restaurant and bar.

Preceding station	Terre Haute, Indianapolis and Eastern Traction Company	Following station
Sullivan Terminus	Sullivan Line	Farmersburg toward Terre Haute

Preceding station	Chicago and Eastern Illinois Railroad	Following station
Services at Glenn Street Station
Sullivan toward Evansville	Main Line	Farmersburg toward Chicago
