= Gambill (surname) =

Gambill is a surname. Notable people with the surname include:

- Jan-Michael Gambill (born 1977), American tennis player
- Robert Gambill (born 1955), American opera singer
- Shauna Gambill (born 1976), American beauty queen
- Tammy Gambill (born 1957), American figure skater and coach

== See also ==
- Gambrill, another surname
