= Gambrill House =

Historic house in Maryland, United States

- U.S. National Register of Historic Places
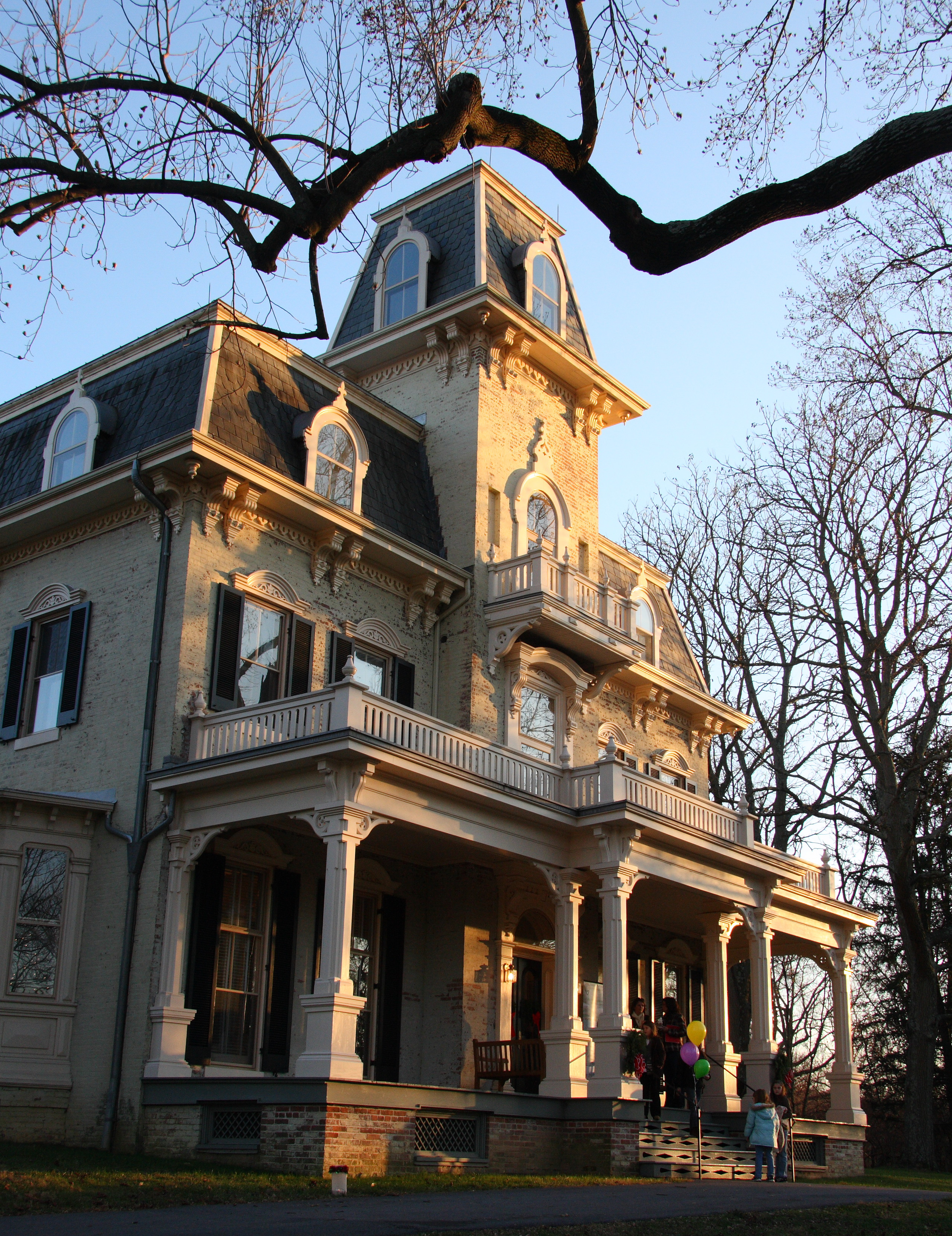

- Location within Maryland Location within the United States
- Location: 4801 Urbana Pike (MD 355), Frederick, Maryland
- Coordinates: 39°21′56″N 77°23′11″W
- Area: less than one acre
- Built: 1868
- Architect: Gambrill, James H.
- Architectural style: Second Empire
- NRHP reference No.: 85002902
- Added to NRHP: November 18, 1985

Gambrill House, also known as Boscobel House and Edgewood, is a house near Frederick, Maryland in the Monocacy National Battlefield. It was listed on the National Register of Historic Places in 1985.

The house is associated with James Gambrill, owner of nearby Araby Mill and the Frederick City Mill. Gambrill's house boasted advanced features such as hot and cold running water, imported Italian marble fireplaces, gas lamps and a coal furnace. Gambrill was forced by financial circumstances to give up the house and mills in 1893. The house was acquired by the National Park Service in 1983 and serves as the home of the NPS Historic Preservation Training Center.
