= Scott City, Atchison County, Missouri =

Extinct hamlet in northwest Missouri, U.S.

Coordinates: 40°24′N 95°38′W

Scott City is an extinct hamlet in Atchison County, in the U.S. state of Missouri. The GNIS classifies it as a populated place, but the precise location of the town site is unknown. It was located on the Missouri River, two miles west of Phelps City.

Scott City had the name of its founder, Margaret Scott, who had settled at the site of the community by at least 1850. The town was laid out in 1856, with an addition known as Kalamazoo added in 1865. Business owners in the community included D. C. Billings and R. V. Muir (merchants), J. K. Tift (attorney), Jacob Bruner (saloon keeper), and Flack Wilson (operator of gristmill and sawmill). Scott City died out after the construction of the Kansas City, St. Joseph & Council Bluffs Railroad; the development of the railroad instead led to growth at Phelps City and Watson. By 1899, the location of Scott City had been washed away by the Missouri River, but a 1939 newspaper article noted that "the land where the town stood has been rebuilt by the uncertain river" but that no remains of the former community were visible.

The community's post office was named North Star. The post office was established in 1857, and remained in operation until 1874.
