= Fairbanks, Indiana =

- Unincorporated community
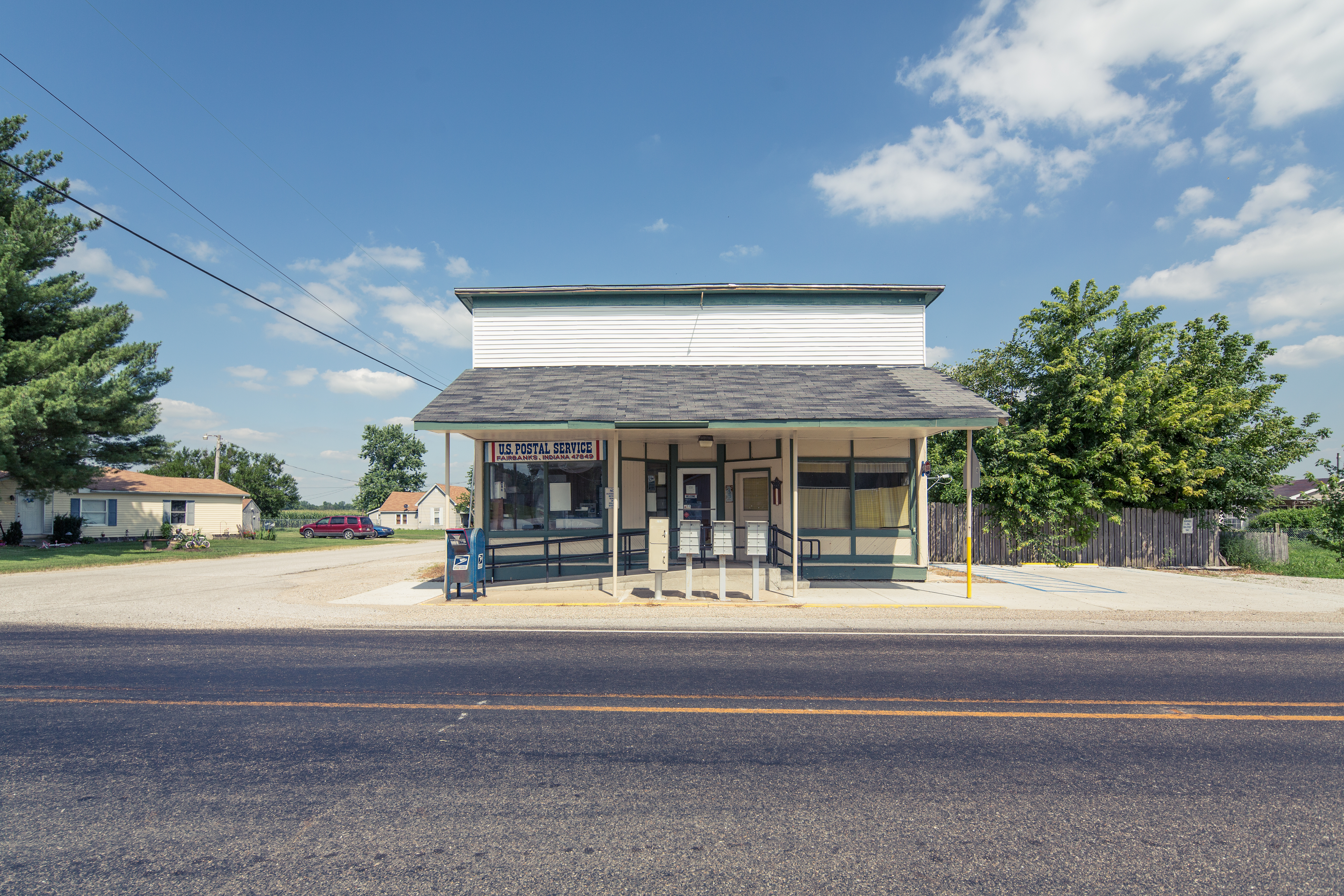

- Sullivan County's location in Indiana

- Sullivan County, Indiana
- Coordinates: 39°13′10″N 87°31′20″W
- Country: United States
- State: Indiana
- County: Sullivan
- Township: Fairbanks
- Elevation: 560 ft (170 m)
- Time zone: UTC-5 (Eastern (EST))
  - Summer (DST): UTC-4 (EDT)
- ZIP code: 47849
- Area codes: 812, 930
- FIPS code: 18-22180
- GNIS feature ID: 434287

Fairbanks is an unincorporated community in Fairbanks Township, Sullivan County, in the U.S. state of Indiana.

The community is part of the Terre Haute Metropolitan Statistical Area.

== History ==
Fairbanks was named after Sgt. Nathan Fairbanks, who was killed in September 1812 when his platoon of 12 soldiers was ambushed by a group of Indians just outside the town. The village of Fairbanks was laid out in 1840 by Benjamin Ernest, James Pogue, and Samuel Myers. On this tract of 20 acres, Pogue had killed a bear which was the last one that had been reported in the area for many years. The first child born in Fairbanks Township was Joel Harris on 17 January 1818, the son of Benjamin and Mary (Paddock) Harris. The first school house was built outside the village in 1823. Students would travel 6 or 7 miles to attend. Professor Ed Liston was the Principal of the school in 1884. The population that year (1884) was 135. The post office at Fairbanks has been in operation since 1878.

== Geography ==
Fairbanks is located at 39°13′10″N 87°31′20″W. It is shown on the Fairbanks United States Geological Survey 7½° quadrangle.

== Demographics ==
The United States Census Bureau first delineated Fairbanks as a census designated place in the 2022 American Community Survey.
