= Jackson Township, Sullivan County, Indiana =

Jackson Township
- Township
- Location in Sullivan County
- Coordinates: 39°12′21″N 87°17′49″W
- Country: United States
- State: Indiana
- County: Sullivan

Government
  - Type: Indiana township

Area
  - Total: 44.12 sq mi (114.3 km^{2})
  - Land: 43.26 sq mi (112.0 km^{2})
  - Water: 0.86 sq mi (2.2 km^{2}) 1.95%
- Elevation: 520 ft (160 m)

Population (2020)
  - Total: 1,722
  - Density: 39.81/sq mi (15.37/km^{2})
- ZIP codes: 47438, 47850, 47855, 47858, 47866, 47879, 47882
- GNIS feature ID: 453470

Jackson Township is one of nine townships in Sullivan County, Indiana, United States. As of the 2020 census, its population was 1,722 and it contained 799 housing units.

Historical population
| Census | Pop. | Note | %± |
|---|---|---|---|
| 1890 | 2,589 | | — |
| 1900 | 3,653 | | 41.1% |
| 1910 | 4,385 | | 20.0% |
| 1920 | 3,773 | | −14.0% |
| 1930 | 2,731 | | −27.6% |
| 1940 | 2,773 | | 1.5% |
| 1950 | 2,192 | | −21.0% |
| 1960 | 2,040 | | −6.9% |
| 1970 | 1,899 | | −6.9% |
| 1980 | 2,099 | | 10.5% |
| 1990 | 1,667 | | −20.6% |
| 2000 | 1,720 | | 3.2% |
| 2010 | 1,904 | | 10.7% |
| 2020 | 1,722 | | −9.6% |
Source: US Decennial Census

== Geography ==
According to the 2010 census, the township has a total area of 44.12 square miles (114.3 km^{2}), of which 43.26 square miles (112.0 km^{2}) (or 98.05%) is land and 0.86 square miles (2.2 km^{2}) (or 1.95%) is water.

=== Cities and towns ===
- Hymera

=== Unincorporated communities ===
- Wilfred

=== Adjacent townships ===
- Pierson Township, Vigo County (north)
- Lewis Township, Clay County (east)
- Wright Township, Greene County (southeast)
- Cass Township (south)
- Hamilton Township (southwest)
- Curry Township (west)
- Linton Township, Vigo County (northwest)

=== Cemeteries ===
The township contains these two cemeteries: Knights of Columbus and Mount Pleasant.

=== Lakes ===
- Hickory Lake

=== Landmarks ===
- Shakamak State Park

== School districts ==
- Northeast School Corporation

== Political districts ==
- Indiana's 8th congressional district
- State House District 45
- State Senate District 39
