= Haddon Township, Sullivan County, Indiana =

Haddon Township
- Township
- Location in Sullivan County
- Coordinates: 38°57′44″N 87°24′02″W
- Country: United States
- State: Indiana
- County: Sullivan

Government
  - Type: Indiana township

Area
  - Total: 71.47 sq mi (185.1 km^{2})
  - Land: 71.22 sq mi (184.5 km^{2})
  - Water: 0.25 sq mi (0.65 km^{2}) 0.35%
- Elevation: 518 ft (158 m)

Population (2020)
  - Total: 3,762
  - Density: 52.82/sq mi (20.39/km^{2})
- ZIP codes: 47561, 47838, 47865, 47882
- GNIS feature ID: 453360

Haddon Township is one of nine townships in Sullivan County, Indiana, United States. As of the 2020 census, its population was 3,762 and it contained 780 housing units.

Historical population
Census	Pop.	Note	%±
1890	3,005		—
1900	3,342		11.2%
1910	3,263		−2.4%
1920	3,412		4.6%
1930	2,974		−12.8%
1940	2,802		−5.8%
1950	2,416		−13.8%
1960	2,176		−9.9%
1970	1,972		−9.4%
1980	1,817		−7.9%
1990	1,780		−2.0%
2000	3,977		123.4%
2010	3,987		0.3%
2020	3,762		−5.6%
Source: US Decennial Census

== Geography ==
According to the 2010 census, the township has a total area of 71.47 square miles (185.1 km^{2}), of which 71.22 square miles (184.5 km^{2}) (or 99.65%) is land and 0.25 square miles (0.65 km^{2}) (or 0.35%) is water.

=== Cities, towns, villages ===
- Carlisle

=== Unincorporated towns ===
- Paxton at 39.021154°N 87.38863°W

(This list is based on USGS data and may include former settlements.)

=== Adjacent townships ===
- Hamilton Township (north)
- Cass Township (northeast)
- Jefferson Township (east)
- Widner Township, Knox County (southeast)
- Busseron Township, Knox County (southwest)
- Montgomery Township, Crawford County, Illinois (west)
- Gill Township (northwest)

=== Cemeteries ===
The township contains these thirty two cemeteries: Alsman, Arnett, Bethlehem, Benefiel, Booker, Boone, Boyle, Carlisle Old Town, Cartwright, Dooley, Duncan, Engle, Hackett, Haddon, Harper, Independent Order of Odd Fellows, Land, Ledgerwood, Lewis, Loudermilk, McCammon, Mccammon #1, Neil Paxton, Providence, Purcell, Skidmore, Shepard, Snyder, Trimble, Vester, Wilson, and Walters.

=== Major highway ===
- U.S. Route 41

== School districts ==
- Southwest School Corporation

== Political districts ==
- Indiana's 8th congressional district
- State House District 45
- State Senate District 39
