= Carlisle, Indiana =

- Town
- Location of Carlisle in Sullivan County, Indiana.
- Coordinates: 38°57′44″N 87°24′2″W
- Country: United States
- State: Indiana
- County: Sullivan
- Township: Haddon

Government
  - Type: Town Board
  - Town Board President: David Watkins

Area
  - Total: 0.52 sq mi (1.34 km^{2})
  - Land: 0.52 sq mi (1.34 km^{2})
  - Water: 0 sq mi (0.00 km^{2})
- Elevation: 482 ft (147 m)

Population (2020)
  - Total: 625
  - Estimate (2026): 660
  - Density: 1,206.0/sq mi (465.62/km^{2})
- Time zone: EST
  - Summer (DST): EST
- ZIP code: 47838
- Area code: 812
- FIPS code: 18-10270
- GNIS feature ID: 432132
- Website: https://www.town-of-carlisle-indiana.com

Carlisle is a town in Haddon Township, Sullivan County, in the U.S. state of Indiana. Founded in 1815, while the area was still part of the Indiana Territory, Carlisle served as the seat of Sullivan County government during the county's earliest years before the county seat was moved to Merom, Indiana in 1819. The arrival of the Evansville and Crawfordsville Railroad in 1854 helped establish Carlisle as a shipping point for the surrounding agricultural region. As of the 2020 US census, the town had a population of 625.

== History ==
Early settlement

Town Name Sign

European-American settlement in the area surrounding present-day Carlisle began in the first years of the nineteenth century, when the region was still part of Knox County in the Indiana Territory. The Ledgerwood family was among the earliest families documented in the area, settling along the Busseron Creek in 1803. James Ledgerwood's Mill, it was described in an 1814 advertisement as a combined saw and grist mill and is identified in early county histories as the first grist mill in what became Sullivan County.

Another prominent early settle was John Haddon, a native of Virginia whose family settled in the area during the first decade of the nineteenth century. A fortified settlement known as Fort Haddon was constructed around 1806 near his home, which still remains. During periods of conflict and alarm in the years preceding and during the War of 1812, nearby settler families gathered at Fort Haddon and other fortified blockhouses in the region for protection. Haddon Township, in which Carlisle is located, was later named in honor of John Haddon.

The early settlement was commonly associated with Busseron Creek and became known as the Busseron settlement. Before the establishment of local postal and governmental institutions, residents traveled to Vincennes for mail and public business. Samuel Ledgerwood, a member of the pioneer Ledgerwood family, appears in Vincennes postal records as early as 1807.

Founding and early county government

Carlisle was formally laid out in 1815. The land on which the town was established was owned by Samuel Ledgerwood, who joined James Sproul and William McFarland in developing the townsite. An advertisement published in the Vincennes Western Sun on June 10, 1815, announced that lots in the new town would be offered for sale on June 23. The advertisement promoted Carlisle's location near Busseron Creek and the former Ledgerwood mill and emphasized the site's central location within the growing settlement.

The original town plat consisted of 25 blocks arranged around a central public square. The square was reserved for a courthouse, reflecting the founders' hope that Carlisle would become the seat of government for a new county expected to be formed from northern Knox County. Several streets in the original plat carried the names of pioneer families and early residents, including Ledgerwood, Gill, Turman and Eaton.

When Sullivan County was created in late 1816, the home of James Sproul was designated as the temporary seat of justice until a permanent county seat could be selected. Carlisle consequently functioned as Sullivan County's first center of government for approximately two years. An 1817 notice issued by the county sheriff referred to a tax sale to be held at the "court house in the town of Carlisle." Local tradition recorded in a 1909 county history also held that some early court proceedings were conducted outdoors beneath a large beech tree in the town.

A permanent courthouse was never constructed on Carlisle's public square. Merom was selected as the permanent county seat, and county business had moved there by 1819. The county seat was later relocated to Sullivan in the 1840s.

Carlisle's first store is traditionally dated to 1815, and a post office was established the following year. A frame Methodist church was built in 1818. The removal of the county government to Merom slowed Carlisle's early growth, although the surrounding mills, farms and local businesses continued to support the community.

=== Newspapers and commerce ===
Carlisle played an early role in the development of journalism in Sullivan County. Around 1844, Jeremiah Young established the Jacksonian Democrat in Carlisle, the first newspaper known to have been published in the county. It was followed by the Carlisle Messenger, which a later county history described as Sullivan County's first regular newspaper. A surviving issue of the Messenger from November 1845 documents a community with merchants, tailors, harness makers, physicians and attorneys operating in the town.

Later Carlisle newspapers included the Carlisle Democrat, Carlisle Argus and Carlisle News.

=== Railroad and incorporation ===
A major period of growth began with construction of the Evansville and Crawfordsville Railroad through the region in 1854. The proposed route initially would have passed approximately three miles from Carlisle despite earlier financial support from local residents. In response, sixteen Carlisle businessmen and residents pledged an additional $30,000 to secure a route through the town.

The arrival of the railroad transformed Carlisle into a shipping point for the surrounding agricultural region and encouraged new commercial development. The railroad line was completed through Carlisle in 1854 and connected with the line extending northward later that year.

Following the railroad's arrival, residents petitioned Sullivan County officials to incorporate Carlisle as a town. An incorporation vote held March 25, 1856, passed overwhelmingly, with 57 affirmative votes among 60 ballots cast. Carlisle's first elected town government consisted of five trustees, a clerk and a marshal.

One of the new municipal government's first major projects was construction of a public school. A four-room brick schoolhouse was erected on the former courthouse square in 1857, replacing the earlier district-school system. Classes began in the building in December of that year. In 1903, residents voted to replace it with a larger two-story brick school, which opened in 1904.

=== Coal era ===
Coal mining became increasingly important to Carlisle's economy during the early twentieth century. The Carlisle Clay and Coal Company was organized in 1905 and acquired or leased substantial mining property near the town. The sinking of a coal shaft brought new construction and business activity, contributing to a period of population growth during the early decades of the twentieth century.

== Geography ==

Carlisle is located at 38°57′44″N 87°24′2″W (38.962240, -87.400691).

According to the 2010 census, Carlisle has a total area of 0.52 square miles (1.35 km^{2}), all land.

== Demographics ==
Historical population
Census	Pop.	Note	%±
1860	459		—
1870	499		8.7%
1880	489		−2.0%
1890	503		2.9%
1900	699		39.0%
1910	850		21.6%
1920	973		14.5%
1930	852		−12.4%
1940	874		2.6%
1950	767		−12.2%
1960	755		−1.6%
1970	714		−5.4%
1980	717		0.4%
1990	613		−14.5%
2000	2,660		333.9%
2010	692		−74.0%
2020	625		−9.7%
U.S. Decennial Census

=== 2010 census ===
As of the census of 2010, there were 692 people, 271 households, and 188 families living in the town. The population density was 1,330.8 inhabitants per square mile (513.8/km^{2}). There were 311 housing units at an average density of 598.1 per square mile (230.9/km^{2}). The racial makeup of the town was 97.1% White, 0.6% Native American, 1.9% from other races, and 0.4% from two or more races. Hispanic or Latino of any race were 2.7% of the population.

There were 271 households, of which 35.4% had children under the age of 18 living with them, 52.4% were married couples living together, 12.9% had a female householder with no husband present, 4.1% had a male householder with no wife present, and 30.6% were non-families. 28.4% of all households were made up of individuals, and 16.6% had someone living alone who was 65 years of age or older. The average household size was 2.55 and the average family size was 3.11.

The median age in the town was 38.2 years. 25.9% of residents were under the age of 18; 9.1% were between the ages of 18 and 24; 22.5% were from 25 to 44; 24.4% were from 45 to 64; and 18.2% were 65 years of age or older. The gender makeup of the town was 49.6% male and 50.4% female.

=== 2000 census ===
As of the census of 2000, there were 2,660 people, 286 households, and 193 families living in the town. The population density was 4,953.5 inhabitants per square mile (1,912.6/km^{2}). There were 322 housing units at an average density of 599.6 per square mile (231.5/km^{2}). The racial makeup of the town, including prison population, was 63.68% White, 32.26% African American, 0.90% Native American, 0.08% Asian, 1.58% from other races, and 1.50% from two or more races. Hispanic or Latino of any race were 2.14% of the population.

There were 286 households, out of which 32.2% had children under the age of 18 living with them, 51.0% were married couples living together, 12.2% had a female householder with no husband present, and 32.5% were non-families. 30.1% of all households were made up of individuals, and 15.4% had someone living alone who was 65 years of age or older. The average household size was 2.40 and the average family size was 3.00.

In the town, the population was spread out, with 7.0% under the age of 18, 17.9% from 18 to 24, 53.9% from 25 to 44, 16.2% from 45 to 64, and 5.0% who were 65 years of age or older. The median age was 34 years. For every 100 females, there were 603.7 males. For every 100 females age 18 and over, there were 756.1 males.

The median income for a household in the town was $29,875, and the median income for a family was $36,250. Males had a median income of $28,207 versus $20,682 for females. The per capita income for the town was $12,822. About 12.0% of families and 13.4% of the population were below the poverty line, including 14.5% of those under age 18 and 9.8% of those age 65 or over.

== Education ==
Carlisle is served by the Southwest School Corporation. Carlisle Elementary School and Carlisle Middle School share a campus in the town, with Carlisle Elementary serving students in pre-kindergarten through fifth grade and Carlisle Middle serving grades six through eight.

In 2024, Carlisle Middle School received an Excellence in STEM Award from the Indiana Department of Education, recognizing its work to expand student access to high-quality science, technology, engineering and mathematics education.

Carlisle also has a branch of the Sullivan County Public Library. The Carlisle library is one of four branch libraries in the county system outside the main library in Sullivan.

== Notable residents ==
- John Wesley Davis, U.S. Congressman and Speaker of the House of Representatives
- John Haddon (1760–1819), pioneer settler, Revolutionary War veteran and member of the Indiana territorial legislature; Fort Haddon was established at his homestead, and Haddon Township was named for the Haddon family.
- John Lee Davis (1825–1889), United States Navy rear admiral born in Carlisle; Civil War naval officer and later commander of the Asiatic Squadron.
- Oliver P. Rood (c. 1844–1885), Union Army soldier and Medal of Honor recipient who lived in Carlisle before the Civil War; awarded the Medal of Honor for capturing the flag of the 21st North Carolina Infantry at the Battle of Gettysburg.
- James Scott (1767–1855), delegate to Indiana's 1816 constitutional convention and one of the first justices of the Indiana Supreme Court; spent the final period of his life in Carlisle, where he died and was buried.
- Jesse Haddon (1837–1906), Civil War officer and longtime Haddon Township resident; rose from private to captain in the 21st Indiana Volunteer Infantry, fought at Baton Rouge and Port Hudson, and later owned Carlisle's opera house and was active in local civic and political affairs.
