= Merom, Indiana =

- Town
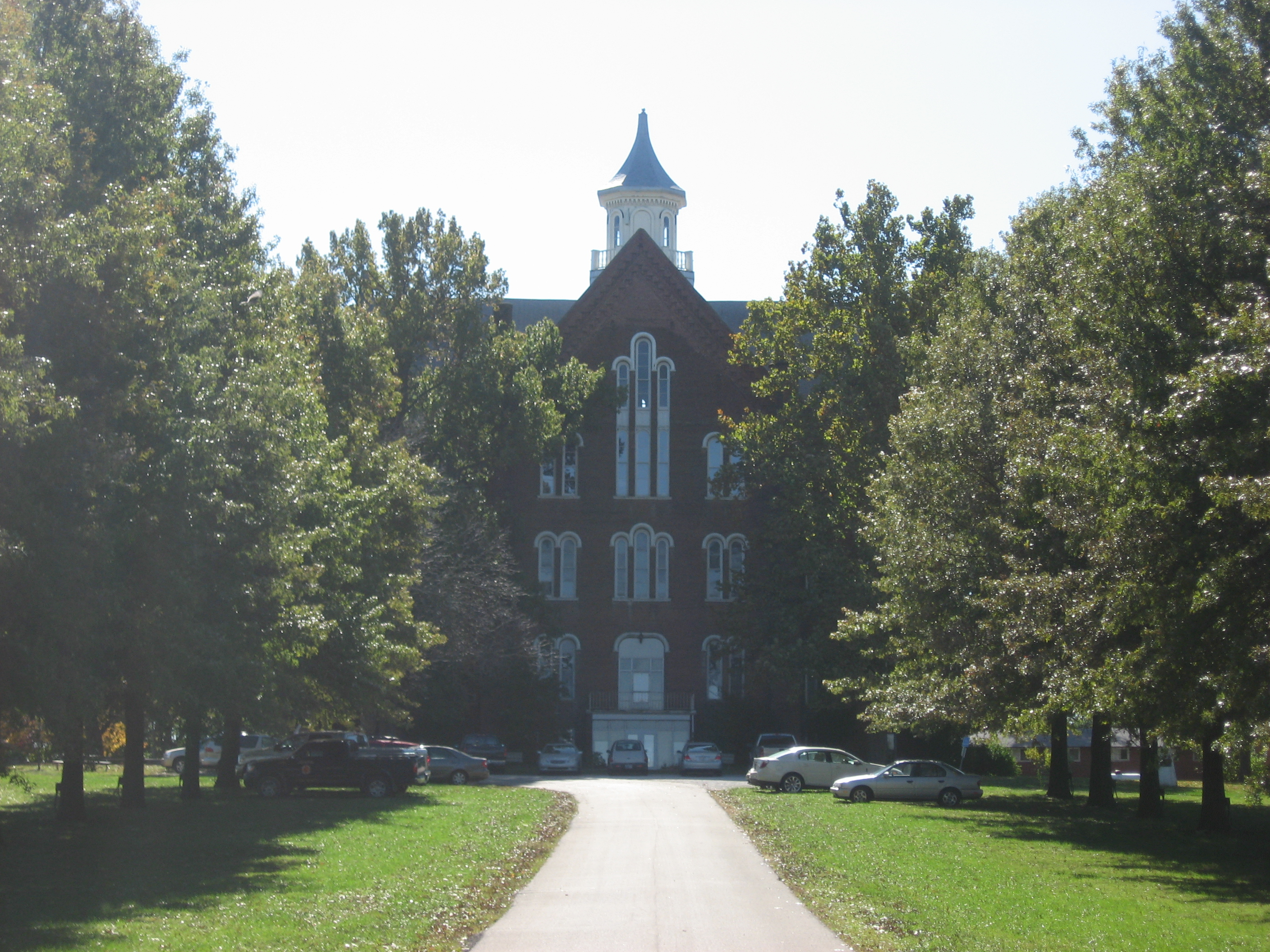
- The former Union Christian College in Merom is listed on the National Register of Historic Places

- Location of Merom in Sullivan County, Indiana.
- Coordinates: 39°3′25″N 87°34′0″W
- Country: United States
- State: Indiana
- County: Sullivan
- Township: Gill

Area
  - Total: 0.36 sq mi (0.92 km^{2})
  - Land: 0.36 sq mi (0.92 km^{2})
  - Water: 0 sq mi (0.00 km^{2})
- Elevation: 548 ft (167 m)

Population (2020)
  - Total: 208
  - Density: 585.1/sq mi (225.91/km^{2})
- Time zone: UTC-5 (Eastern (EST))
  - Summer (DST): UTC-4 (EDT)
- ZIP code: 47861
- Area code: 812
- FIPS code: 18-48474
- GNIS feature ID: 439023
- Website: http://meromindiana.org/

Merom is a town in Gill Township, Sullivan County, Indiana, United States. As of the 2020 census, Merom had a population of 208. It is part of the Terre Haute Metropolitan Statistical Area. Nearby is Hallador Energy's Merom Generating Station.

== History ==
Merom was founded by Stinnett Gettinger in 1817, and a log courthouse located there served as the first Sullivan County seat.

The town's name commemorates the Battle of the Waters of Merom in the Hebrew Bible. The Merom post office has been in operation since 1818.

Union Christian College existed in Merom from 1859 to 1924.

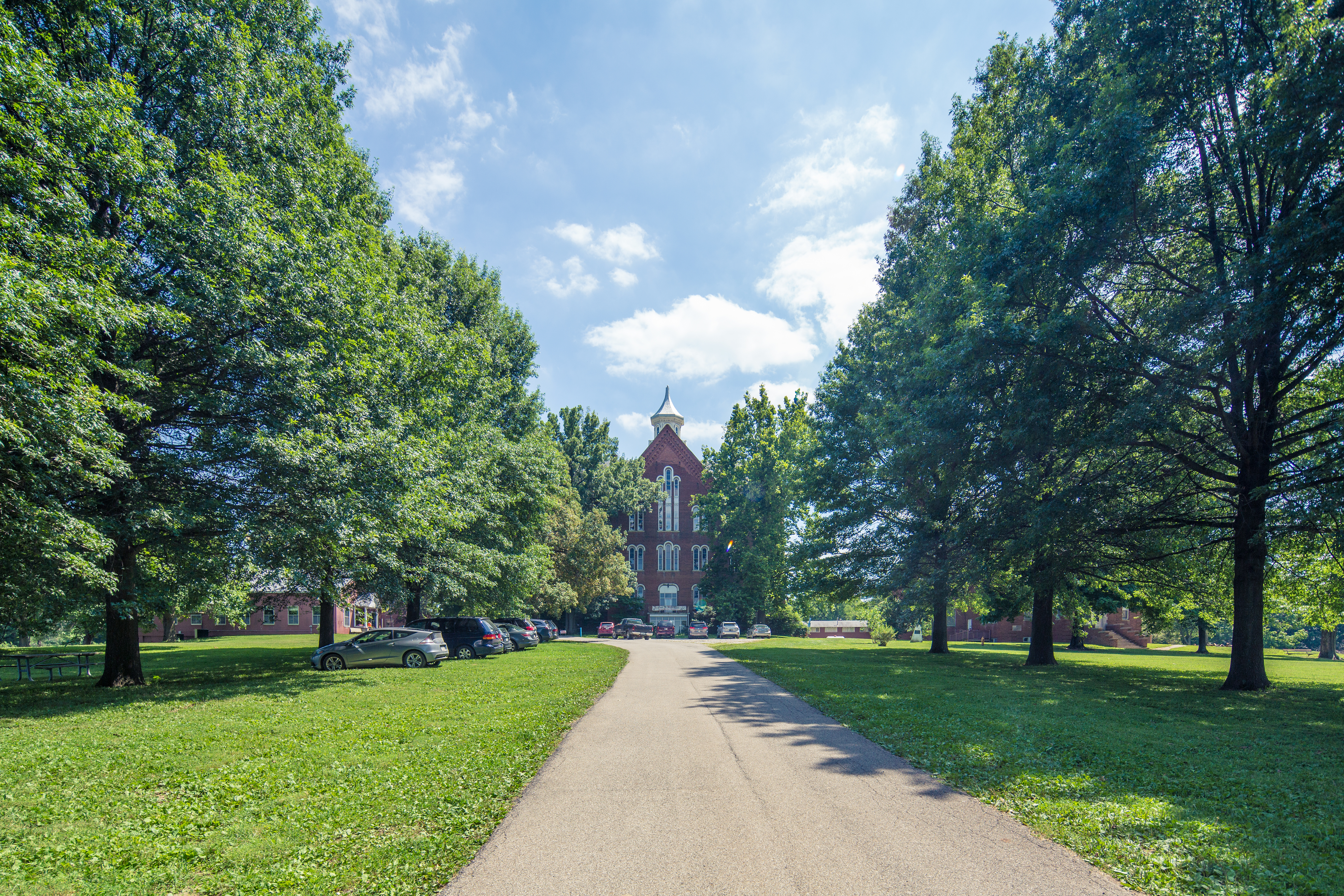
Photo from Small Town Indiana photo survey

== Geography ==
Merom is located at 39°3′25″N 87°34′0″W (39.056950, -87.566573).

According to the 2010 census, the town has a total area of 0.36 square miles (0.93 km^{2}), all land.

The Bluff Park in Merom is the site of the type locality of the Merom Sandstone.

== Demographics ==
Historical population
Census	Pop.	Note	%±
1860	234		—
1870	426		82.1%
1880	407		−4.5%
1890	412		1.2%
1900	478		16.0%
1910	521		9.0%
1920	503		−3.5%
1930	397		−21.1%
1940	499		25.7%
1950	374		−25.1%
1960	352		−5.9%
1970	305		−13.4%
1980	360		18.0%
1990	257		−28.6%
2000	294		14.4%
2010	228		−22.4%
2020	208		−8.8%
U.S. Decennial Census

=== 2010 census ===
As of the census of 2010, there were 228 people, 99 households, and 59 families living in the town. The population density was 633.3 inhabitants per square mile (244.5/km^{2}). There were 123 housing units at an average density of 341.7 per square mile (131.9/km^{2}). The racial makeup of the town was 100.0% White. Hispanic or Latino of any race were 0.4% of the population.

There were 99 households, of which 36.4% had children under the age of 18 living with them, 42.4% were married couples living together, 13.1% had a female householder with no husband present, 4.0% had a male householder with no wife present, and 40.4% were non-families. 37.4% of all households were made up of individuals, and 20.2% had someone living alone who was 65 years of age or older. The average household size was 2.30 and the average family size was 2.97.

The median age in the town was 39.4 years. 30.3% of residents were under the age of 18; 4.8% were between the ages of 18 and 24; 21.5% were from 25 to 44; 27.1% were from 45 to 64; and 16.2% were 65 years of age or older. The gender makeup of the town was 50.4% male and 49.6% female.

=== 2000 census ===
As of the census of 2000, there were 294 people, 108 households, and 81 families living in the town. The population density was 813.7 inhabitants per square mile (314.2/km^{2}). There were 135 housing units at an average density of 373.6 per square mile (144.2/km^{2}). The racial makeup of the town was 98.30% White, 0.68% African American, and 1.02% from two or more races. Hispanic or Latino of any race were 0.68% of the population.

There were 108 households, out of which 43.5% had children under the age of 18 living with them, 60.2% were married couples living together, 9.3% had a female householder with no husband present, and 25.0% were non-families. 21.3% of all households were made up of individuals, and 11.1% had someone living alone who was 65 years of age or older. The average household size was 2.72 and the average family size was 3.12.

In the town, the population was spread out, with 32.0% under the age of 18, 3.4% from 18 to 24, 32.0% from 25 to 44, 19.0% from 45 to 64, and 13.6% who were 65 years of age or older. The median age was 36 years. For every 100 females, there were 101.4 males. For every 100 females age 18 and over, there were 86.9 males.

The median income for a household in the town was $31,528, and the median income for a family was $33,333. Males had a median income of $30,250 versus $20,750 for females. The per capita income for the town was $13,087. About 13.5% of families and 14.5% of the population were below the poverty line, including 11.4% of those under the age of eighteen and 3.6% of those 65 or over.

== Education ==
Merom has a public library, a branch of the Sullivan County Public Library.

The grand opening of the Merom – Gill Township Carnegie Library was on Sep. 1, 1918. The two-story structure has beautiful oak woodwork and paintings by local artist Will Turman. The Merom Library became a part of the Sullivan County Public Library system on Dec. 28, 1967. Locals believe that Merom is the smallest town in the U.S. with a Carnegie-built library.

== Arts and culture ==
The Merom Camp and Retreat Center is located on the site of the former Union Christian College. The Merom Bluff Park, which overlooks the Wabash River and the farm fields of Illinois, is home to the annual Merom Chautauqua.
