= Hamilton Township, Sullivan County, Indiana =

Hamilton Township
- Township
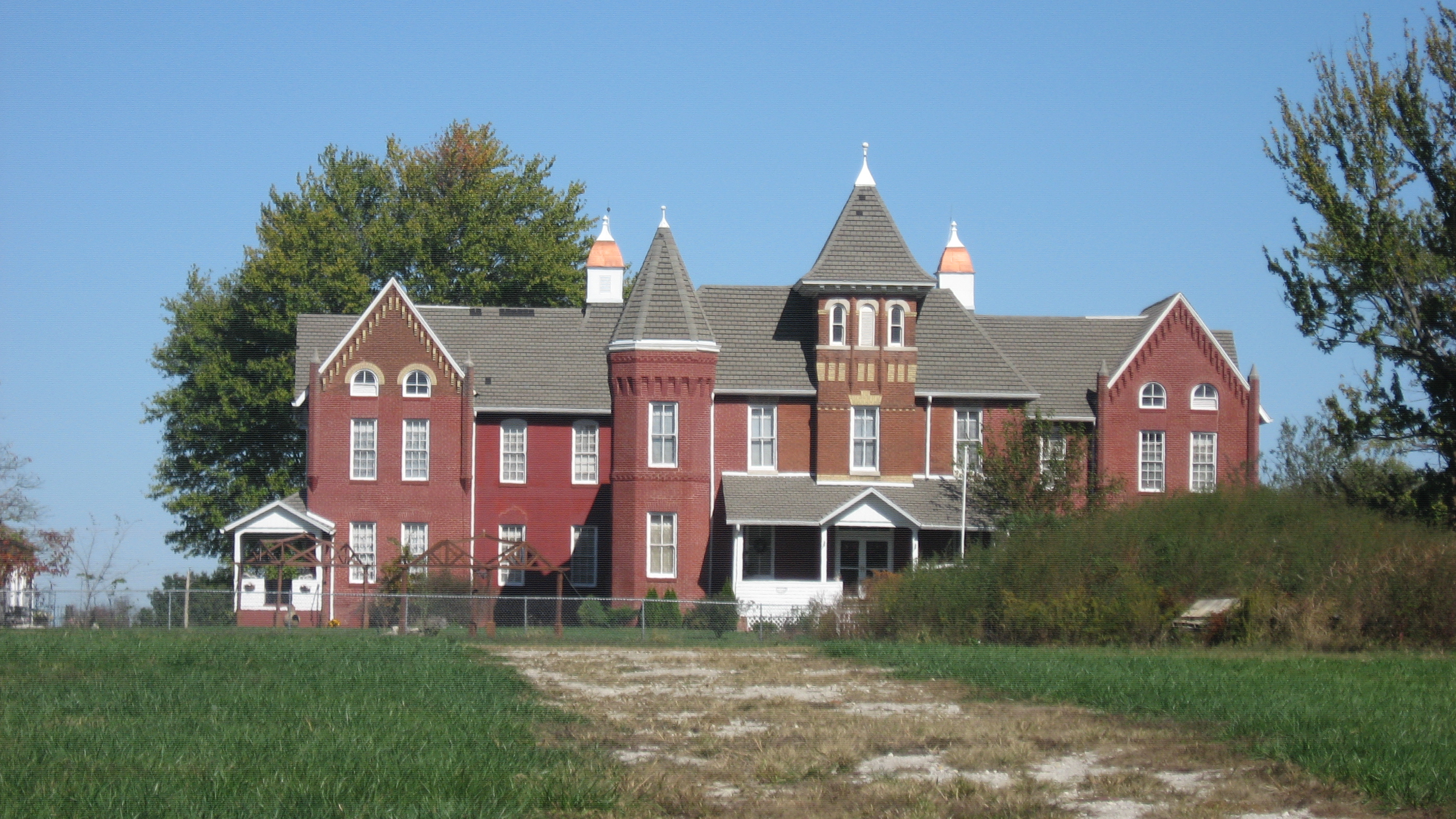
- Sullivan County Poor Home, east of the city of Sullivan

- Location in Sullivan County
- Coordinates: 39°06′47″N 87°23′38″W
- Country: United States
- State: Indiana
- County: Sullivan

Government
  - Type: Indiana township

Area
  - Total: 60.91 sq mi (157.8 km^{2})
  - Land: 59.58 sq mi (154.3 km^{2})
  - Water: 1.33 sq mi (3.4 km^{2}) 2.18%
- Elevation: 512 ft (156 m)

Population (2020)
  - Total: 7,143
  - Density: 119.9/sq mi (46.29/km^{2})
- ZIP codes: 47879, 47882
- GNIS feature ID: 453366

Hamilton Township is one of nine townships in Sullivan County, Indiana, United States. As of the 2020 census, its population was 7,143 and it contained 3,404 housing units.

Historical population
Census	Pop.	Note	%±
1890	4,241		—
1900	5,480		29.2%
1910	7,206		31.5%
1920	7,182		−0.3%
1930	7,824		8.9%
1940	7,258		−7.2%
1950	7,313		0.8%
1960	6,884		−5.9%
1970	6,555		−4.8%
1980	6,945		5.9%
1990	6,899		−0.7%
2000	7,083		2.7%
2010	6,869		−3.0%
2020	7,143		4.0%
Source: US Decennial Census

== Geography ==
According to the 2010 census, the township has a total area of 60.91 square miles (157.8 km^{2}), of which 59.58 square miles (154.3 km^{2}) (or 97.82%) is land and 1.33 square miles (3.4 km^{2}) (or 2.18%) is water.

=== Cities, towns, villages ===
- Sullivan (the county seat)

=== Unincorporated towns ===
- Benefiel Corner at 39.128375°N 87.408908°W
- Jackson Hill at 39.168375°N 87.361963°W

(This list is based on USGS data and may include former settlements.)

=== Adjacent townships ===
- Curry Township (north)
- Jackson Township (northeast)
- Cass Township (east)
- Haddon Township (south)
- Gill Township (southwest)
- Turman Township (west)
- Fairbanks Township (northwest)

=== Major highways ===
- U.S. Route 41
- State Road 54

=== Airports and landing strips ===
- Sullivan County Airport

=== Landmarks ===
- Sullivan County Park

== School districts ==
- Southwest School Corporation

== Political districts ==
- Indiana's 8th congressional district
- State House District 45
- State Senate District 39
