= Sherman Building (Sullivan, Indiana) =

- U.S. National Register of Historic Places
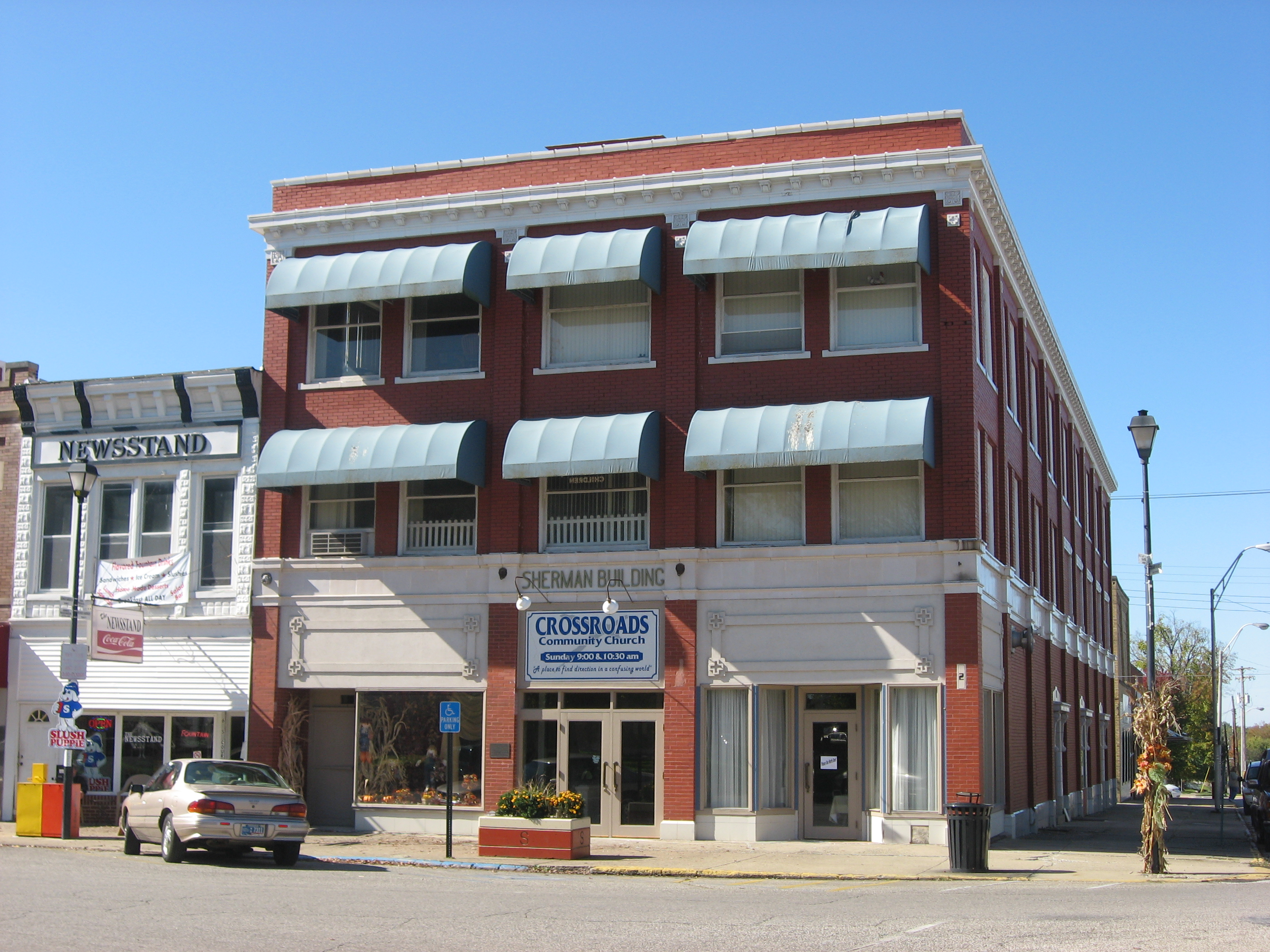
- Sherman Building, October 2011

- Location within USA Indiana Sullivan County Location within Indiana Location within the United States
- Location: 2--4 S. Court St., Sullivan, Indiana
- Coordinates: 39°5′43″N 87°24′31″W
- Area: less than one acre
- Built: 1915
- Architect: Nicholas, F.J.; Sherman, Cuthbert J.
- NRHP reference No.: 86002712
- Added to NRHP: September 22, 1986

Sherman Building is a historic commercial building located at Sullivan, Indiana. It was built between 1926 and 1915, and is a three-story, rectangular, brick building with terra cotta trim. The building housed the Sherman Theater on the first and second floors and offices on the third floor.

It was listed on the National Register of Historic Places in 1986.
