= Union Christian College, Merom =

- Union Christian College
- U.S. National Register of Historic Places
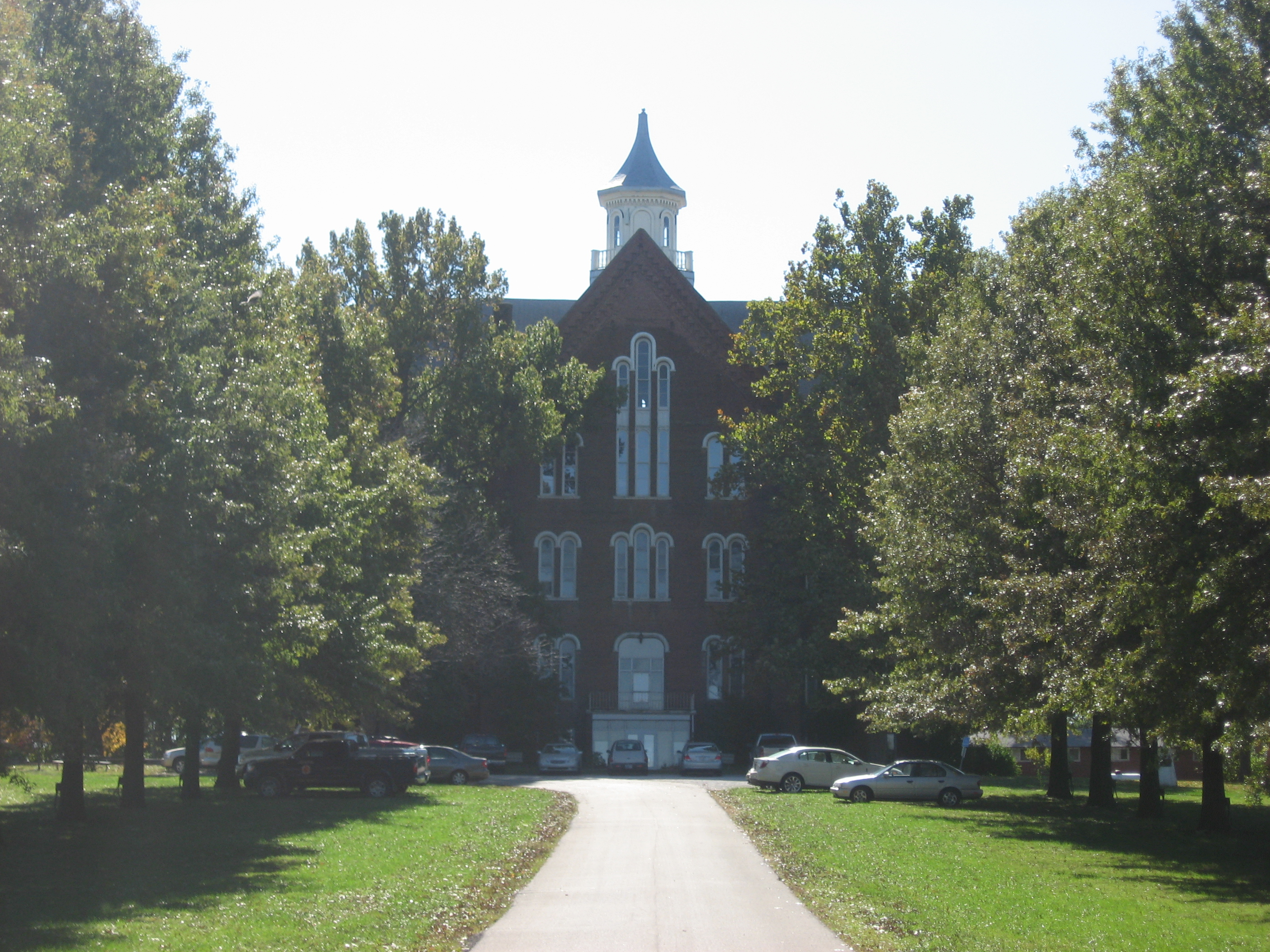
- Front of the college building

- Location within USA Indiana Sullivan County Location within Indiana Location within the United States
- Location: 3rd and Philip Sts., Merom, Indiana
- Coordinates: 39°3′3″N 87°33′53″W
- Area: Less than 1 acre (0.40 ha)
- Built: 1859
- Architect: O.H. Wheelock; G.W. Webster
- NRHP reference No.: 82000076
- Added to NRHP: June 25, 1982

Union Christian College was a small co-educational college located in Merom, Indiana. Founded by the denomination called the Christian Church which eventually merged with the Congregational denomination which later joined with the Evangelical and Reformed Churches to form the United Church of Christ. It was one of the first co-educational colleges that allowed women to take any class that a man could take. Other co-educational colleges would only allow their women to study home economics, nursing, teaching, secretarial, etc. At UCC women could study to be doctors, lawyers, ministers, or home-makers. UCC was very progressive for its time. One of its most notable alumni was James M. Hamilton (class of 1890), who became the third president of Montana State University, serving from 1904 to 1919.

Union Christian College existed from 1859 until it closed its doors in 1924. From 1924 to 1936 the buildings were empty except for the summer months when summer youth conferences (summer camp) took place on the grounds In 1936 the facilities were reopened as the Merom Institute and was owned by the Indiana-Kentucky Conference of the United Church of Christ and was known as the Merom Conference Center. In 2016 Merom Conference Center separated from the IKC UCC. It now stands as its own entity, Merom Camp and Retreat Center. It was listed on the National Register of Historic Places in 1982.
