= National Register of Historic Places listings in Greene County, Indiana =

Location of Greene County in Indiana

This is a list of the National Register of Historic Places listings in Greene County, Indiana.

This is intended to be a complete list of the properties and districts on the National Register of Historic Places in Greene County, Indiana, United States. Latitude and longitude coordinates are provided for many National Register properties and districts; these locations may be seen together in a map.

There are eight properties and districts listed on the National Register in the county.

Properties and districts located in incorporated areas display the name of the municipality, while properties and districts in unincorporated areas display the name of their civil township. Properties and districts split between multiple jurisdictions display the names of all jurisdictions.

This National Park Service list is complete through NPS recent listings posted August 29, 2025.

== Current listings ==
	Name on the Register	Image	Date listed	Location	City or town	Description
1	Greene County Courthouse	Greene County Courthouse	September 17, 2008 (#08000912)	Main and Washington Sts. 39°01′35″N 86°56′16″W	Bloomfield	
2	Linton Commercial Historic District	Linton Commercial Historic District	March 30, 2007 (#07000214)	Roughly bounded by B St., N., 1st St., E., A St., S., and 1st St., W. 39°02′03″N 87°09′58″W	Linton	
3	Linton Public Library	Linton Public Library	September 22, 2000 (#00001141)	110 E. Vincennes St. 39°02′04″N 87°09′53″W	Linton	
4	Old Clifty Church		August 31, 2020 (#100005506)	3088 South Old Clifty Rd. 38°58′36″N 86°45′39″W	Bloomfield	
5	Osborn Site	Osborn Site	May 12, 1975 (#75000019)	Southeastern quarter of the southwestern quarter of Section 28 Town 7 North Range 5 West, southwest of Bloomfield; 39°00′36″N 86°58′19″W	Fairplay Township	
6	Richland-Plummer Creek Covered Bridge	Richland-Plummer Creek Covered Bridge	June 10, 1993 (#93000466)	Baseline Rd. over Plummer Creek, south of Bloomfield; 38°59′34″N 86°56′16″W	Taylor Township	
7	Scotland Hotel	Scotland Hotel	May 27, 1993 (#93000467)	Northeastern corner of the junction of Main and Jackson Sts. at Scotland; 38°54′47″N 86°54′14″W	Taylor Township	
8	Shakamak State Park Historic District	Shakamak State Park Historic District	March 15, 2000 (#00000199)	6265 W. State Road 48, west of Jasonville; 39°10′34″N 87°14′04″W	Wright Township	Extends into Clay and Sullivan counties

== See also ==
- List of National Historic Landmarks in Indiana
- National Register of Historic Places listings in Indiana
- Listings in neighboring counties: Clay, Daviess, Knox, Lawrence, Martin, Monroe, Owen, Sullivan
- List of Indiana state historical markers in Greene County
