= List of Indiana state historical markers in Greene County =

Location of Greene County in Indiana

This is a list of the Indiana state historical markers in Greene County.

This is intended to be a complete list of the official state historical markers placed in Greene County, Indiana, United States by the Indiana Historical Bureau. The locations of the historical markers and their latitude and longitude coordinates are included below when available, along with their names, years of placement, and topics as recorded by the Historical Bureau. There are 2 historical markers located in Greene County.

== Historical markers ==
Marker title	Image	Year placed	Location	Topics
Richland-Plummer Creek Covered Bridge		1998	Northeastern end of the Richland-Plummer Creek Covered Bridge, which carries Baseline Road over Plummer Creek about 2 miles south of Bloomfield; 38°59′35″N 86°56′16″W	Transportation, Buildings and Architecture
Fred A. Jewell		1998	Junction of U.S. Route 231 and State Road 157 at Fountain Triangle Park in Worthington; 39°7′8″N 86°58′34.5″W	Arts and Culture

== See also ==
- List of Indiana state historical markers
- National Register of Historic Places listings in Greene County, Indiana
