= Stafford Township, Indiana =

Stafford Township, Indiana may refer to one of the following places:

- Stafford Township, DeKalb County, Indiana
- Stafford Township, Greene County, Indiana

See also

- Stafford Township (disambiguation)
