= John Patten House =

- U.S. National Register of Historic Places
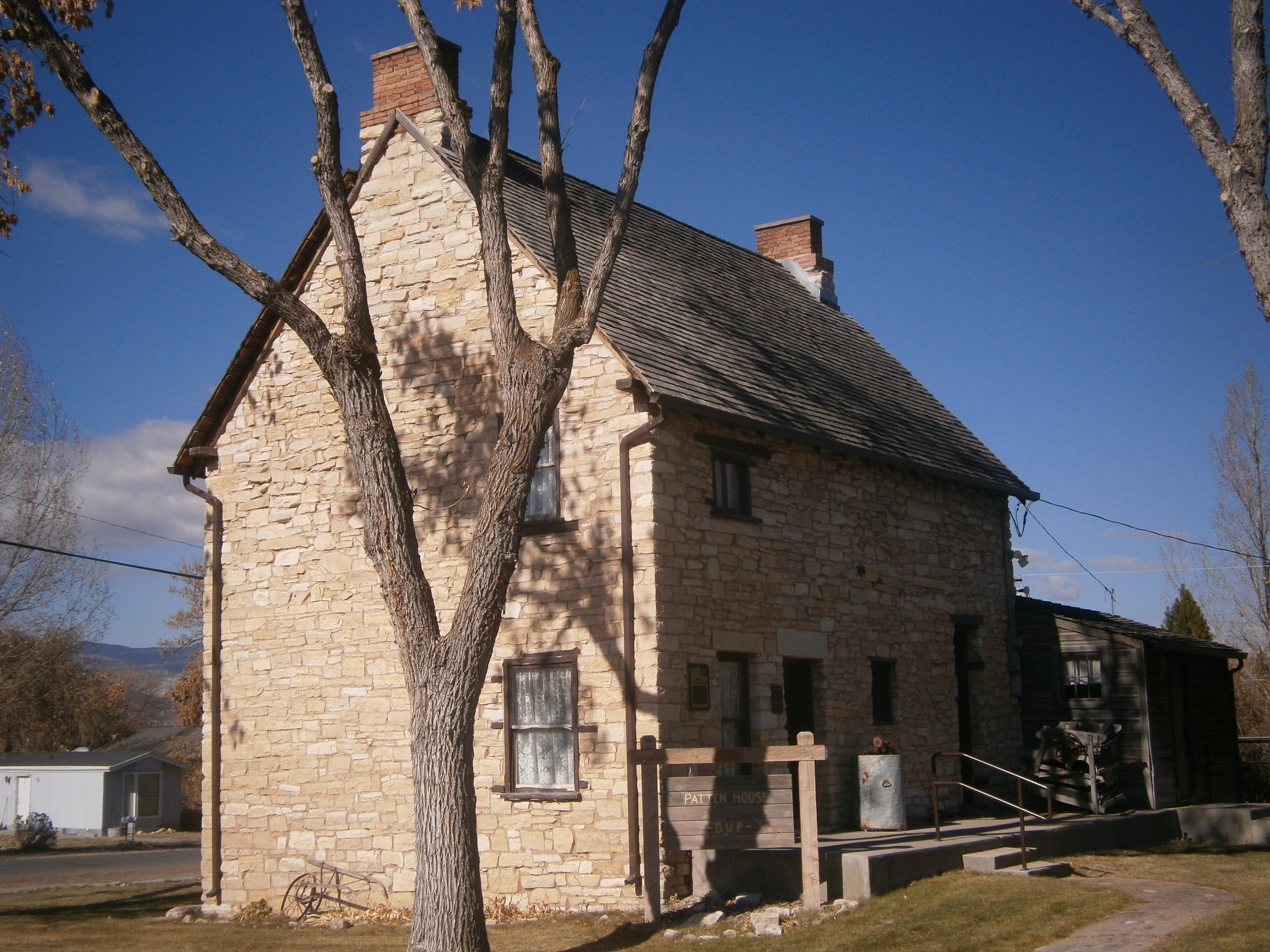

- Location within Utah Location within the United States
- Location: Northeast corner of W. 300 North and N. 100 West, Manti, Utah
- Coordinates: 39.270034°N 111.638587°W
- Area: less than one acre
- Built: 1854
- Built by: John Patten
- Architectural style: Mormon vernacular
- NRHP reference No.: 77001315
- Added to NRHP: August 22, 1977

The John Patten House is a historic two-story house in Manti, Utah. It was built with limestone in 1854 by John Patten, a native of Fairplay, Indiana who converted to the Church of Jesus Christ of Latter-day Saints in the 1830s with his family and relocated to Utah in 1850. Patten had two sons and three daughters with his first wife Candace Smith. After she died, he married her sister Emily, and they had three sons and two daughters. The house has been listed on the National Register of Historic Places since August 22, 1977.

The house is primitive vernacular in style, and, in 1977 was being restored by the Daughters of the Utah Pioneers to serve as a pioneer museum. It faces west, and a 1981 photo shows it with the Manti Temple in the background, to the northeast.

Its NRHP nomination lists it at 95 W. 400 North St.; the house is found, however, at northeast corner of W. 300 North and N. 100 West, instead.
