= Smith Township, Greene County, Indiana =

Smith Township
- Township
- Location in Greene County
- Coordinates: 39°07′51″N 87°04′47″W
- Country: United States
- State: Indiana
- County: Greene

Government
  - Type: Indiana township

Area
  - Total: 29.84 sq mi (77.3 km^{2})
  - Land: 29.81 sq mi (77.2 km^{2})
  - Water: 0.03 sq mi (0.078 km^{2}) 0.10%
- Elevation: 577 ft (176 m)

Population (2020)
  - Total: 387
  - Density: 13.0/sq mi (5.01/km^{2})
- GNIS feature ID: 0453851

Smith Township is one of fifteen townships in Greene County, Indiana, USA. As of the 2020 census, its population was 387, slightly up from 383 at 2010.

Historical population
Census	Pop.	Note	%±
1890	921		—
1900	1,023		11.1%
1910	852		−16.7%
1920	784		−8.0%
1930	575		−26.7%
1940	587		2.1%
1950	563		−4.1%
1960	495		−12.1%
1970	419		−15.4%
1980	440		5.0%
1990	401		−8.9%
2000	344		−14.2%
2010	383		11.3%
2020	387		1.0%
Source: US Decennial Census

== Geography ==
According to the 2010 census, the township has a total area of 29.84 square miles (77.3 km^{2}), of which 29.81 square miles (77.2 km^{2}) (or 99.90%) is land and 0.03 square miles (0.078 km^{2}) (or 0.10%) is water. The stream of Hall Branch runs through this township.

=== Unincorporated towns ===
- Lone Tree

(This list is based on USGS data and may include former settlements.)

=== Adjacent townships ===
- Harrison Township, Clay County (north)
- Jefferson Township, Owen County (northeast)
- Jefferson Township (east)
- Fairplay Township (southeast)
- Grant Township (south)
- Stockton Township (southwest)
- Wright Township (west)
- Lewis Township, Clay County (northwest)

=== Cemeteries ===
The township contains four cemeteries: Bohley, Campbell, Fuller and Scafford Prairie.

=== Major highways ===
- SR 48
