= Washington Township, Greene County, Indiana =

Washington Township
- Township
- Location in Greene County
- Coordinates: 38°57′48″N 87°03′32″W
- Country: United States
- State: Indiana
- County: Greene

Government
  - Type: Indiana township

Area
  - Total: 42.95 sq mi (111.2 km^{2})
  - Land: 42.53 sq mi (110.2 km^{2})
  - Water: 0.42 sq mi (1.1 km^{2}) 0.98%
- Elevation: 482 ft (147 m)

Population (2020)
  - Total: 1,017
  - Density: 23.91/sq mi (9.233/km^{2})
- GNIS feature ID: 0453997

Washington Township is one of fifteen townships in Greene County, Indiana, USA. As of the 2010 census, its population was 1,017, down from 1,186 at 2010.

Historical population
Census	Pop.	Note	%±
1890	1,804		—
1900	2,404		33.3%
1910	2,306		−4.1%
1920	2,092		−9.3%
1930	1,733		−17.2%
1940	1,639		−5.4%
1950	1,341		−18.2%
1960	1,246		−7.1%
1970	1,241		−0.4%
1980	1,366		10.1%
1990	1,213		−11.2%
2000	1,256		3.5%
2010	1,186		−5.6%
2020	1,017		−14.2%
Source: US Decennial Census

== Geography ==
According to the 2010 census, the township has a total area of 42.95 square miles (111.2 km^{2}), of which 42.53 square miles (110.2 km^{2}) (or 99.02%) is land and 0.42 square miles (1.1 km^{2}) (or 0.98%) is water. Lakes in this township include Long Pond. The stream of Fourmile Creek runs through this township.

=== Cities and towns ===
- Lyons

=== Unincorporated towns ===
- Beehunter
- Plummer

(This list is based on USGS data and may include former settlements.)

=== Adjacent townships ===
- Fairplay Township (northeast)
- Richland Township (northeast)
- Taylor Township (east)
- Cass Township (southeast)
- Vigo Township, Knox County (southwest)
- Stafford Township (west)
- Grant Township (northwest)
- Stockton Township (northwest)

=== Cemeteries ===
The township contains two cemeteries: Bogard and Mount Zion (Dog Island) and Marco.

=== Major highways ===
- SR 57
- SR 67
