= Martin Wines =

American politician

Martin Wines was a politician in the U.S. state of Indiana and one of the most prominent men in the early history of Greene County.

Descended from a family that settled in the Massachusetts Bay Colony in the early seventeenth century, Wines was one of the pioneers of Greene County. Settling in Fairplay Township, he was the first person to teach school in his portion of the county, and he was the county's first inspector of elections. Greene County was organized in 1821, and Wines was elected as the county's first representative to the Indiana General Assembly in Corydon. At that time, the community of Fairplay was the largest settlement in the county, and efforts were made to have it named the county seat; however, other influences succeeded in winning this status for Bloomfield, which remains the county seat to the present day. In March 1824, Wines began to serve as an associate judge of the local circuit court. His first term required little work, as the local grand jury returned only six indictments during the whole term. Later in the year, the court tried the first murder case to arise in Greene County.

Besides serving in political office, Wines was known for his hospitality; his neighbors testified that he would invite virtually any stranger into his home. By 1875, he was no longer alive, but his widow was still living at that time; she was known for her well-preserved health despite her age of over eighty years. After his death, later generations of Wines' family moved farther west; for example, his grandson John M. Osborn grew up in Indiana, but he moved to Nebraska in 1867 and was elected to the state's senate in 1896.
