= Beehunter =

Beehunter may refer to:

- Beehunter, Indiana, a rail junction and former station
- Beehunter, another word for the Beewolf
