= Stockton Township, Greene County, Indiana =

Stockton Township
- Township
- Location in Greene County
- Coordinates: 39°02′20″N 87°11′03″W
- Country: United States
- State: Indiana
- County: Greene

Government
  - Type: Indiana township

Area
  - Total: 36.67 sq mi (95.0 km^{2})
  - Land: 36.06 sq mi (93.4 km^{2})
  - Water: 0.62 sq mi (1.6 km^{2}) 1.69%
- Elevation: 554 ft (169 m)

Population (2000)
  - Total: 8,447
  - Density: 234.3/sq mi (90.5/km^{2})
- GNIS feature ID: 0453876

Stockton Township is one of fifteen townships in Greene County, Indiana, USA. As of the 2020 census, its population was 8,158, down from 8,447 at 2010.

Historical population
Census	Pop.	Note	%±
1890	2,751		—
1900	5,675		106.3%
1910	10,992		93.7%
1920	10,333		−6.0%
1930	8,422		−18.5%
1940	8,365		−0.7%
1950	7,939		−5.1%
1960	7,590		−4.4%
1970	7,383		−2.7%
1980	8,658		17.3%
1990	8,313		−4.0%
2000	8,722		4.9%
2010	8,447		−3.2%
2020	8,158		−3.4%
Source: US Decennial Census

== Geography ==
According to the 2010 census, the township has a total area of 36.67 square miles (95.0 km^{2}), of which 36.06 square miles (93.4 km^{2}) (or 98.34%) is land and 0.62 square miles (1.6 km^{2}) (or 1.69%) is water. Lakes in this township include Boy Scout Pond. The stream of Willow Slough runs through this township.

=== Cities and towns ===
- Linton

=== Unincorporated towns ===
- Ellis
- Hoosier
- Island City
- Summit
- Victoria
- White Rose

(This list is based on USGS data and may include former settlements.)

=== Adjacent townships ===
- Wright Township (north)
- Smith Township (northeast)
- Grant Township (east)
- Washington Township (southeast)
- Stafford Township (south)
- Jefferson Township, Sullivan County (southwest)
- Cass Township, Sullivan County (northwest)

=== Cemeteries ===
The township contains six cemeteries: Clayton, Fairview, German, Island City, Old Linton and Richards.

=== Major highways ===
- SR 54
- SR 59

== Education ==
Stockton Township residents may obtain a free library card from the Linton Public Library in Linton.
