= Highland Township, Indiana =

Highland Township is the name of three townships in the U.S. state of Indiana:

- Highland Township, Franklin County, Indiana
- Highland Township, Greene County, Indiana
- Highland Township, Vermillion County, Indiana
