= Richland Township, Greene County, Indiana =

Richland Township
- Township
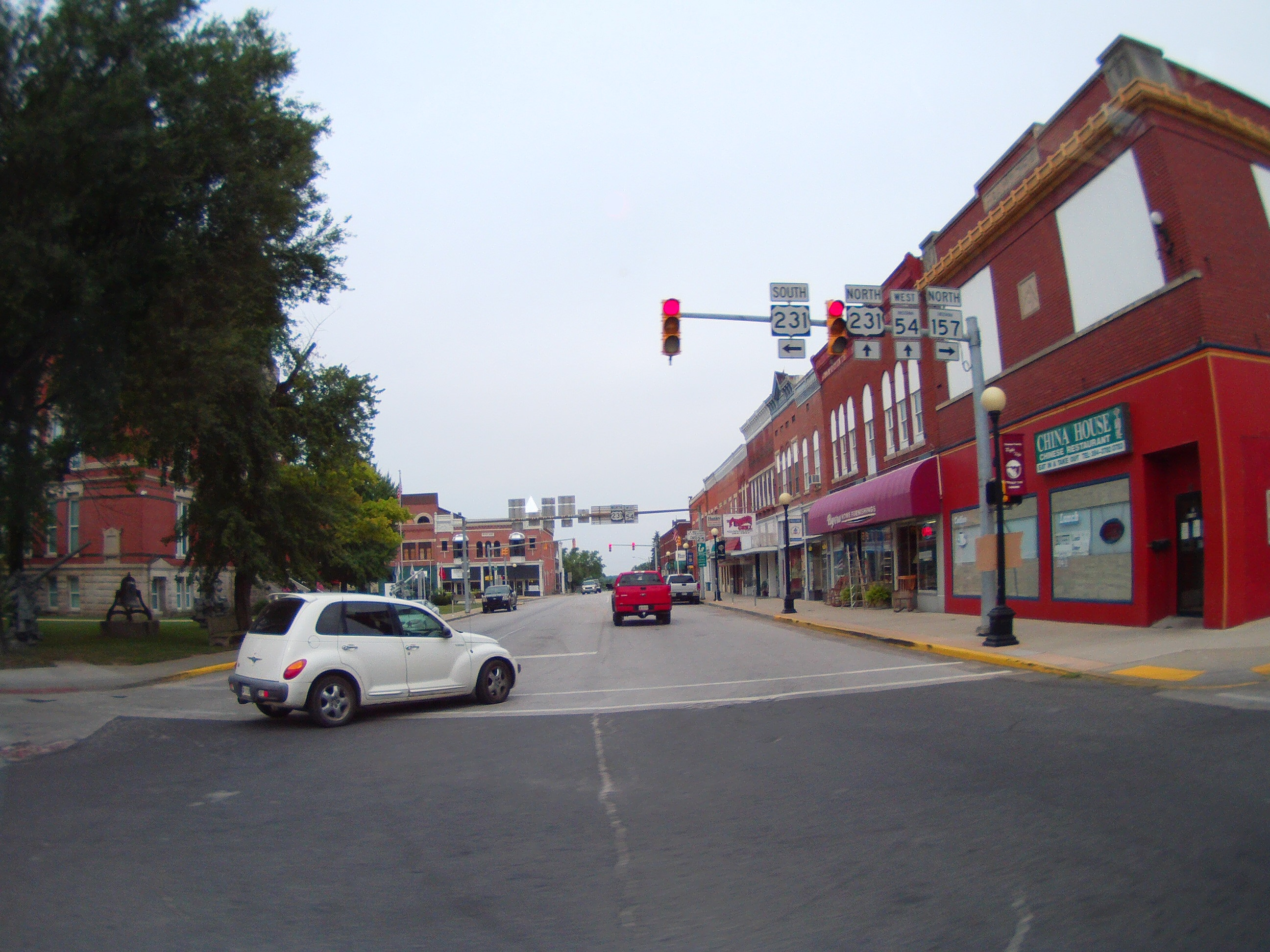
- Downtown Bloomfield, in Richland Township

- Location in Greene County
- Coordinates: 39°02′05″N 86°54′01″W
- Country: United States
- State: Indiana
- County: Greene

Government
  - Type: Indiana township

Area
  - Total: 43.16 sq mi (111.8 km^{2})
  - Land: 42.79 sq mi (110.8 km^{2})
  - Water: 0.37 sq mi (0.96 km^{2}) 0.86%
- Elevation: 499 ft (152 m)

Population (2020)
  - Total: 4,675
  - Density: 109.3/sq mi (42.18/km^{2})
- GNIS feature ID: 0453794

Richland Township is one of fifteen townships in Greene County, Indiana, USA. As of the 2020 census, its population was 4,675, down from 5,019 at 2010.

Historical population
Census	Pop.	Note	%±
1890	2,859		—
1900	3,301		15.5%
1910	3,723		12.8%
1920	3,453		−7.3%
1930	3,780		9.5%
1940	3,984		5.4%
1950	3,634		−8.8%
1960	3,787		4.2%
1970	4,336		14.5%
1980	4,882		12.6%
1990	4,904		0.5%
2000	5,008		2.1%
2010	5,019		0.2%
2020	4,675		−6.9%
Source: US Decennial Census

== Geography ==
According to the 2010 census, the township has a total area of 43.16 square miles (111.8 km^{2}), of which 42.79 square miles (110.8 km^{2}) (or 99.14%) is land and 0.37 square miles (0.96 km^{2}) (or 0.86%) is water. The streams of Beech Creek, Letsinger Branch, Miller Branch, Ore Branch, Plummer Creek, Ritter Branch, Skinner Branch, Stalcup Branch and Wildcat Branch run through this township. It is bounded by Township Road 400 to the north, and the west fork of the White River to the west.

=== Cities and towns ===
- Bloomfield (the county seat)

=== Unincorporated towns ===
- Furnace
- Hashtown
- Mineral City
- Park

(This list is based on USGS data and may include former settlements.)

=== Adjacent townships ===
- Highland Township (north)
- Beech Creek Township (northeast)
- Center Township (east)
- Jackson Township (southeast)
- Taylor Township (south)
- Washington Township (southwest)
- Fairplay Township (west)
- Jefferson Township (northwest)

=== Cemeteries ===
The township contains four cemeteries: Flater, Mount Zion, Union Bethel, and Van Slyke.

=== Major highways ===
- US 231
- SR 54
- SR 157

== Education ==
It is in the Bloomfield School District.
