= Midland, Indiana =

- Census-designated place
- Location within Indiana Location within the United States
- Coordinates: 39°07′19″N 87°11′24″W
- Country: United States
- State: Indiana
- County: Greene
- Township: Wright
- Elevation: 610 ft (190 m)
- ZIP code: 47438
- FIPS code: 18-49086
- GNIS feature ID: 2830390

Midland is an unincorporated community in Wright Township, Greene County, Indiana.

Midland was platted in 1901.

== Demographics ==
The United States Census Bureau defined Midland as a census designated place in the 2022 American Community Survey.
