= Lone Tree, Indiana =

Unincorporated community in Indiana, U.S.

- Unincorporated community
- Location within Indiana Location within the United States
- Country: United States
- State: Indiana
- County: Greene
- Township: Wright

Lone Tree was an unincorporated community in Wright Township, Greene County, Indiana, in the United States. It was located at what is now the intersection of County Road 1000W (also known as Lone Tree Rd) and County Road 700N.

According to the local county tourism board, Lone Tree "was founded in 1860 with a post office and a few businesses, but it was never a thriving village." Records show that the post office was opened in 1857 and closed in 1862; then the Lonetree post office was opened again in 1897 and closed in 1906.

Lone Tree (as well as Lone Tree Prairie and Lone Tree Creek) was likely named for a large oak tree in a prairie that was a local landmark. The Lone Tree was said to be well known to wagon drivers travelling between Louisville, Kentucky and Terre Haute, Indiana.
