= Tulip Viaduct =

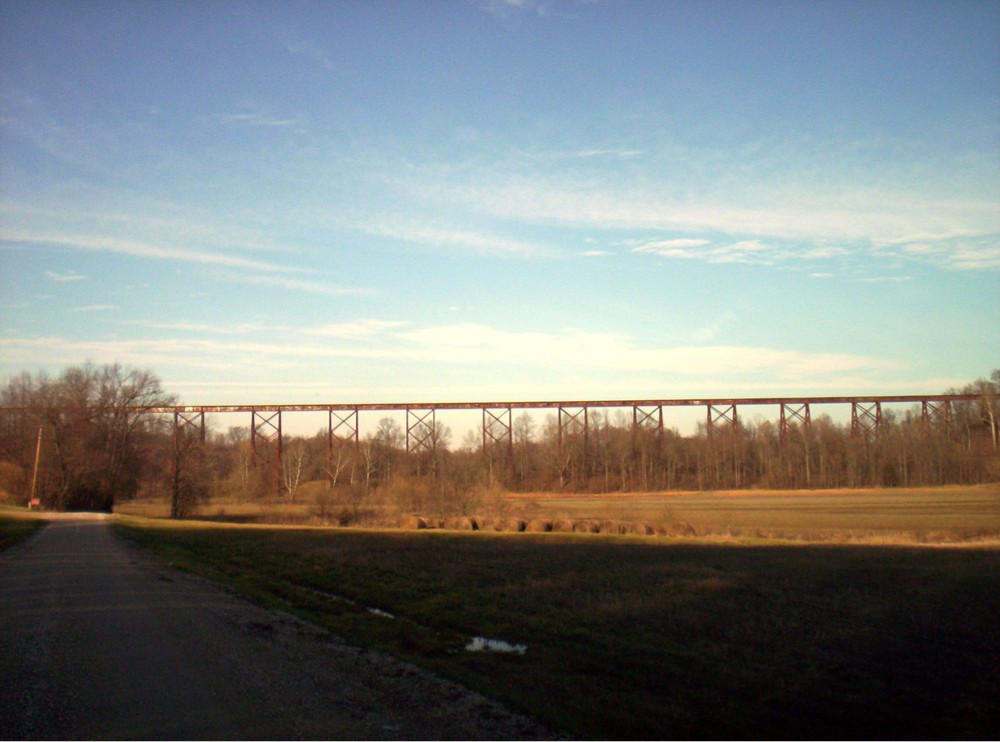
- The Tulip Viaduct
- Coordinates: 39°04.52′N 86°51.31′W
- Crosses: Richland Creek
- Locale: Solsberry, Greene County, Indiana, United States
- Maintained by: Indiana Rail Road
- ID number: X76-6

Characteristics
- Design: Beam bridge
- Total length: 2,295 feet (700 m)
- Height: 157 feet (48 m)
- Longest span: 74 feet (23 m)

History
- Construction start: May 22, 1905
- Construction end: December 1906

Location
- Interactive map of Tulip Viaduct

The Tulip Viaduct is a 2,295-foot (700 m) long railroad bridge (also known as the Greene County Viaduct or Tulip Trestle, and officially designated Bridge X76-6) in Greene County, Indiana, that spans Richland Creek between Solsberry and Tulip. According to Richard Simmons and Francis Haywood Parker, authors of Railroads of Indiana, it is "easily the state's most spectacular railroad bridge". The bridge was built in 1905 and 1906 by the Indianapolis Southern Railway and successor Indianapolis Southern Railroad, which became part of the Illinois Central Railroad in 1911. It is now part of the Indianapolis–Newton, Illinois, line of the Indiana Rail Road.

== History ==
Work on the bridge started on May 22, 1905, when a groundbreaking ceremony was led by Joe Moss. It was finished in December 1906 and, at that time, was the longest rail trestle in the United States and the third longest bridge of its kind in the world. It has 18 towers for support. Other trestles constructed since that time are longer, such as the Hi-Line Railroad Bridge in Valley City, North Dakota, which is 3,860 feet (1,180 m) long.

The original cost of the viaduct was $246,504 which is an estimated $20 million in 2020 dollars. This massive structure was built using mostly Italian immigrant laborers. The laborers were paid up to 30 cents an hour (equivalent to $11 in 2025), which was considered to be an excellent wage in 1906. The viaduct was constructed by Indianapolis Southern Railway and secretly financed by Illinois Central Railroad. It was built for train travel to transport coal from Greene County mines to large cities, such as Chicago. Passenger trains once traveled across the viaduct, but passenger service was discontinued in 1948.

According to a placard that used to be attached to the western side of the bridge (underneath the tracks on a large I-beam), the bridge was constructed by the New York Bridge Company, not the Indianapolis Southern Railway or its successor the Indianapolis Southern Railroad. In 2004 or earlier, the placard had been removed. Two 45-foot (14 m) sections were added to the bridge in 1916. Other than that, the bridge is as it was when it was originally constructed.

Over the years, a large amount of graffiti has been spray-painted on the trestle, especially at the base of the towers nearest the road. The Indiana Rail Road has retained the graffiti: the thickness of the paint prevents rain and snow from rusting the metal, thus preserving the structure.

== Statistics ==
The bridge is 2,295 feet (700 m) long and is 157 feet (48 m) above the ground at its highest point. It was built using 2,700 short tons (2,400 t) of steel and is composed of individual 40-foot (12 m) and 74-foot (23 m) spans supported by eighteen towers.
