= Stafford Township =

Stafford Township may refer to:

== Indiana ==
- Stafford Township, DeKalb County, Indiana
- Stafford Township, Greene County, Indiana

== Kansas ==
- Stafford Township, Stafford County, Kansas, in Stafford County, Kansas

== Minnesota ==
- Stafford Township, Roseau County, Minnesota

== New Jersey ==
- Stafford Township, New Jersey

== North Dakota ==
- Stafford Township, Renville County, North Dakota, in Renville County, North Dakota

== See also ==
- Stafford (disambiguation)
