= Taylor Township, Greene County, Indiana =

Taylor Township
- Township
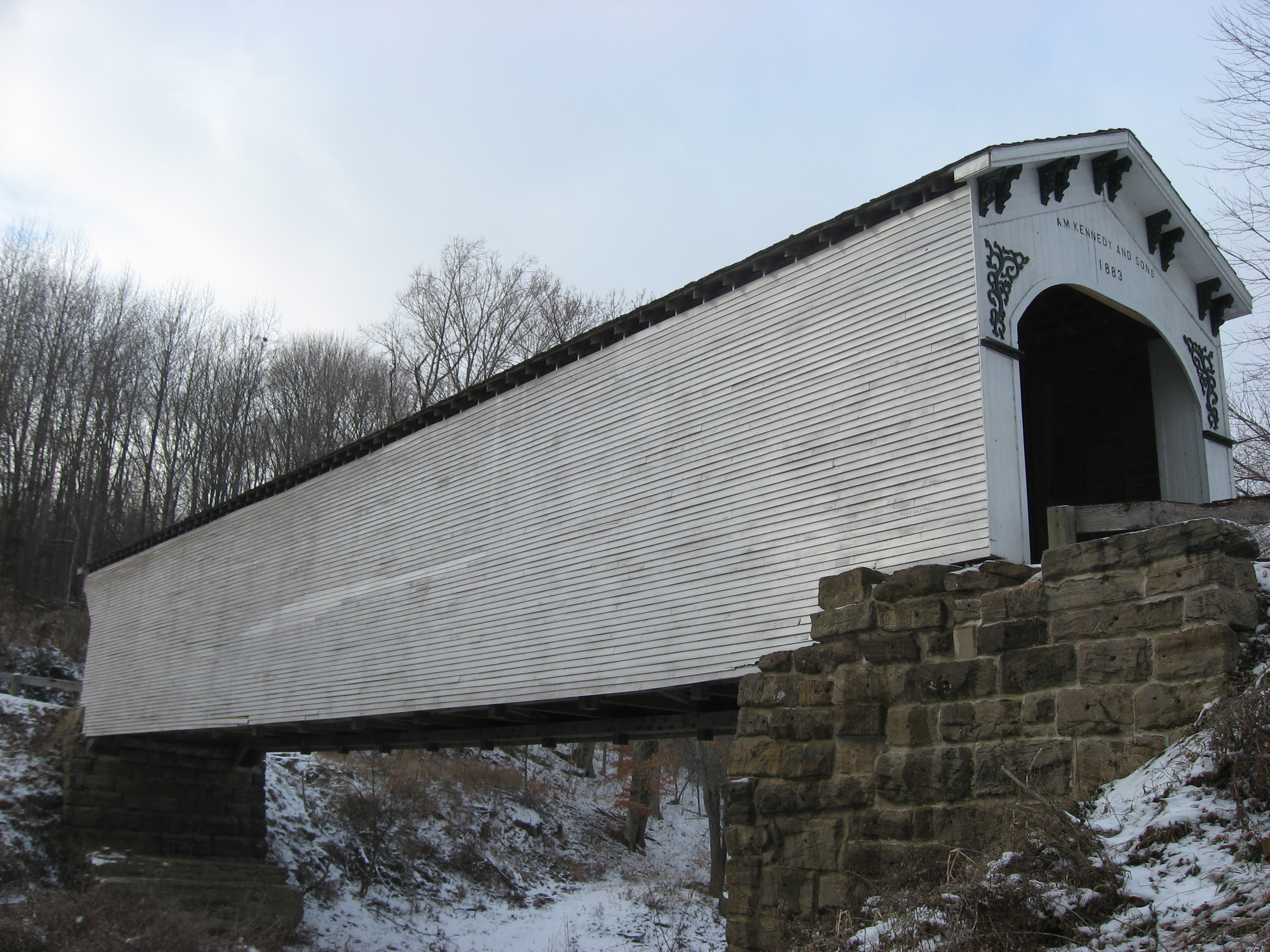
- The Richland-Plummer Creek Covered Bridge, a township landmark

- Location in Greene County
- Coordinates: 38°56′50″N 86°53′57″W
- Country: United States
- State: Indiana
- County: Greene

Government
  - Type: Indiana township

Area
  - Total: 42.36 sq mi (109.7 km^{2})
  - Land: 42.27 sq mi (109.5 km^{2})
  - Water: 0.09 sq mi (0.23 km^{2}) 0.21%
- Elevation: 663 ft (202 m)

Population (2020)
  - Total: 1,098
  - Density: 25.98/sq mi (10.03/km^{2})
- GNIS feature ID: 0453889

Taylor Township is one of fifteen townships in Greene County, Indiana, USA. At the 2020 census, its population was 1,098, down from 1,200 at 2010.

Historical population
Census	Pop.	Note	%±
1890	1,533		—
1900	1,459		−4.8%
1910	1,244		−14.7%
1920	1,221		−1.8%
1930	1,022		−16.3%
1940	1,029		0.7%
1950	841		−18.3%
1960	864		2.7%
1970	938		8.6%
1980	1,107		18.0%
1990	1,086		−1.9%
2000	1,124		3.5%
2010	1,200		6.8%
2020	1,098		−8.5%
Source: US Decennial Census

== History ==
The Richland-Plummer Creek Covered Bridge and Scotland Hotel are listed on the National Register of Historic Places.

== Geography ==
According to the 2010 census, the township has a total area of 42.36 square miles (109.7 km^{2}), of which 42.27 square miles (109.5 km^{2}) (or 99.79%) is land and 0.09 square miles (0.23 km^{2}) (or 0.21%) is water. The streams of Black Ankle Creek, Bogard Creek, Burcham Branch, Clifty Branch, Dowden Branch, Flyblow Branch and Stone Branch run through this township.

=== Unincorporated towns ===
- Doans
- Scotland

(This list is based on USGS data and may include former settlements.)

=== Adjacent townships ===
- Richland Township (north)
- Center Township (northeast)
- Jackson Township (east)
- Perry Township, Martin County (south)
- Madison Township, Daviess County (southwest)
- Cass Township (west)
- Washington Township (west)
- Fairplay Township (northwest)

=== Cemeteries ===
The township contains four cemeteries: Dowden, Hasler, Smith-Bethel and Taylor Ridge.

=== Major highways ===
- US 231
- SR 45
- I-69

== Education ==
It is in the Bloomfield School District.
