= Tulip, Indiana =

- Unincorporated community
- Location within Indiana Location within the United States
- Coordinates: 39°04′55″N 86°53′12″W
- Country: United States
- State: Indiana
- County: Greene
- Township: Highland
- Elevation: 643 ft (196 m)
- ZIP code: 47424
- FIPS code: 18-76688
- GNIS feature ID: 444945

Tulip is an unincorporated community in Highland Township, Greene County, Indiana, United States.

== History ==
According to one source, the community was likely named for the American tulip tree. A post office was established at Tulip in 1884, and remained in operation until it was discontinued in 1906.

== Geography ==
The Tulip Viaduct spans Richland Creek between Solsberry and Tulip.
