= Hoosier, Indiana =

- Unincorporated community
- Location within Indiana Location within the United States
- Coordinates: 39°04′00″N 87°11′09″W
- Country: United States
- State: Indiana
- County: Greene
- Township: Stockton
- Elevation: 627 ft (191 m)
- ZIP code: 47441
- FIPS code: 18-34618
- GNIS feature ID: 436413

Hoosier is an unincorporated community in Stockton Township, Greene County, Indiana.

The community took the name of a local mine. It also has the same name as what people in Indiana are referred too.
