= Grant Township, Greene County, Indiana =

Grant Township
- Township
- Location in Greene County
- Coordinates: 39°02′08″N 87°05′09″W
- Country: United States
- State: Indiana
- County: Greene

Government
  - Type: Indiana township

Area
  - Total: 24.61 sq mi (63.7 km^{2})
  - Land: 24.59 sq mi (63.7 km^{2})
  - Water: 0.03 sq mi (0.078 km^{2}) 0.12%
- Elevation: 548 ft (167 m)

Population (2020)
  - Total: 682
  - Density: 27.7/sq mi (10.7/km^{2})
- GNIS feature ID: 0453336

Grant Township is one of fifteen townships in Greene County, Indiana, USA. As of the 2020 census, its population was 682, down from 739 at 2010.

Historical population
Census	Pop.	Note	%±
1890	1,006		—
1900	1,099		9.2%
1910	1,009		−8.2%
1920	973		−3.6%
1930	898		−7.7%
1940	867		−3.5%
1950	731		−15.7%
1960	715		−2.2%
1970	668		−6.6%
1980	764		14.4%
1990	704		−7.9%
2000	690		−2.0%
2010	739		7.1%
2020	682		−7.7%
Source: US Decennial Census

== Geography ==
According to the 2010 census, the township has a total area of 24.61 square miles (63.7 km^{2}), of which 24.59 square miles (63.7 km^{2}) (or 99.92%) is land and 0.03 square miles (0.078 km^{2}) (or 0.12%) is water. The stream of Buck Creek runs through this township.

=== Cities and towns ===
- Switz City (west three-quarters)

=== Adjacent townships ===
- Smith Township (north)
- Fairplay Township (east)
- Washington Township (southeast)
- Stafford Township (southwest)
- Stockton Township (west)
- Wright Township (northwest)

=== Cemeteries ===
The township contains three cemeteries: Buzan, Switz City and Waggoner.

=== Major highways ===
- SR 54
- SR 67
