= 1860 United States presidential election in Indiana =

- November 6, 1860
- Turnout: 89.4% ▲1.1 pp
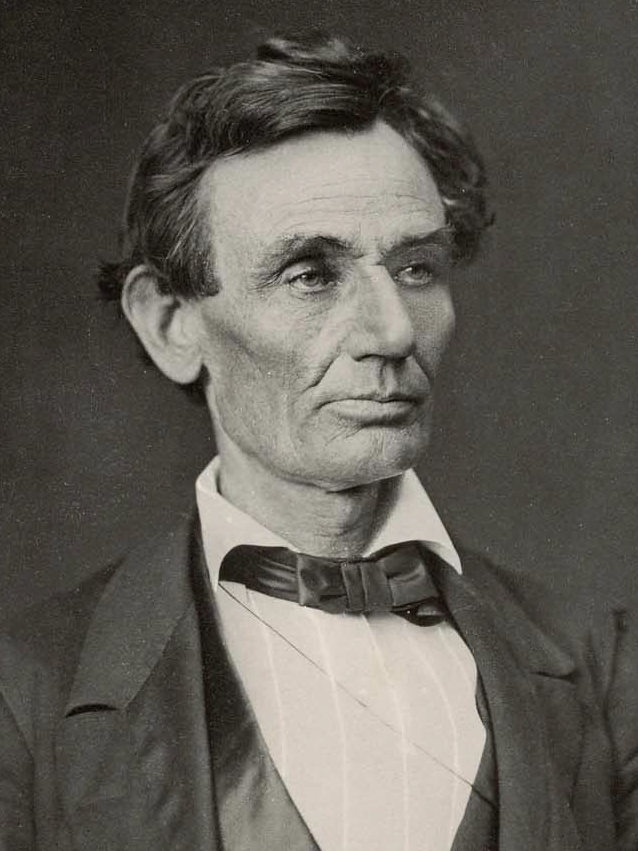

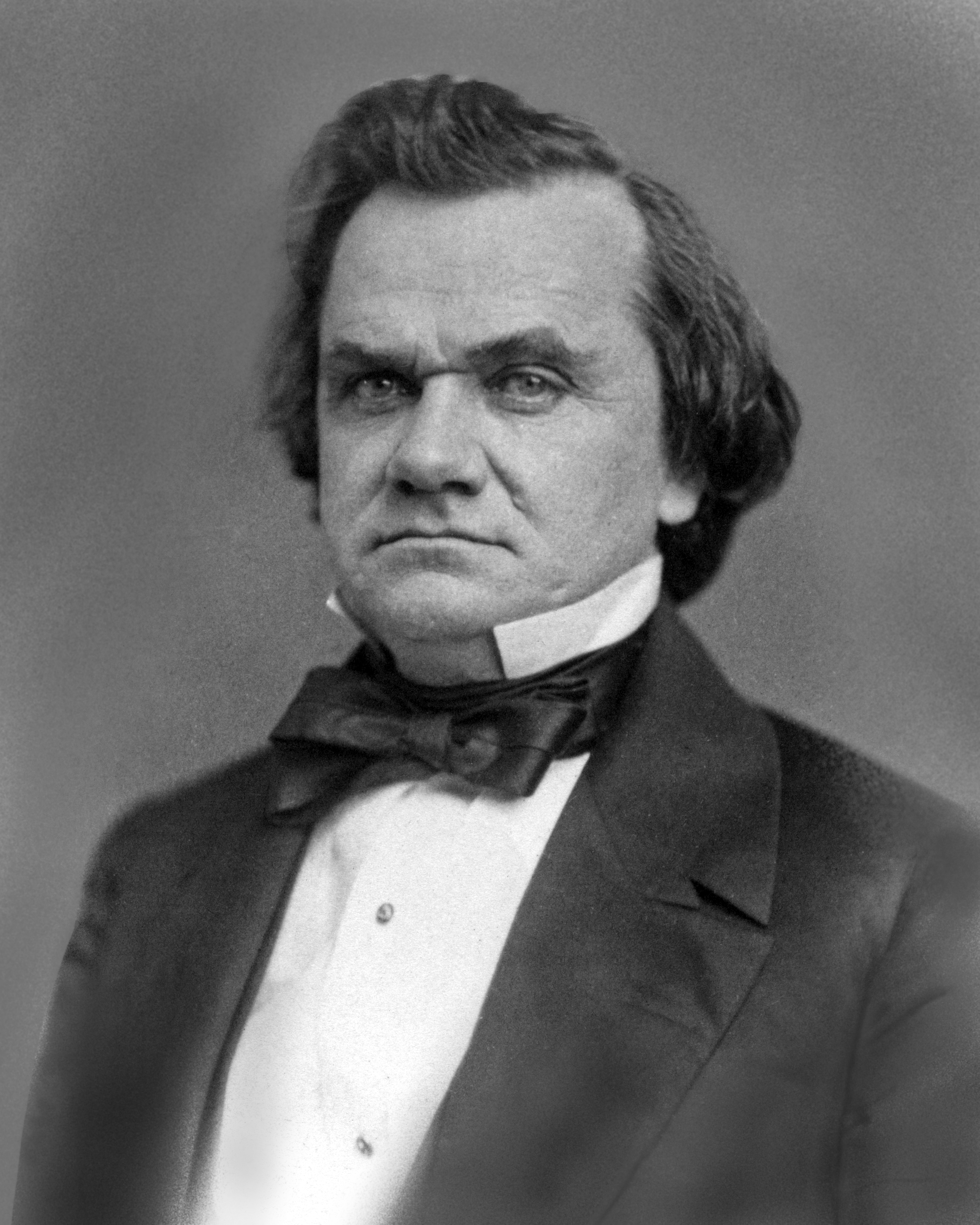
Nominee	Abraham Lincoln	Stephen A. Douglas
Party	Republican	Democratic
Home state	Illinois	Illinois
Running mate	Hannibal Hamlin	Herschel V. Johnson (Note: Replacing Benjamin Fitzpatrick.)
Electoral vote	13	0
Popular vote	139,013	115,166
Percentage	51.14%	42.37%
County results
Lincoln
30–40%
40–50%
50–60%
60–70%
70–80%
Douglas
30–40%
40–50%
50–60%
60–70%
80–90%
Breckinridge
30–40%
President before election
James Buchanan
Democratic
Elected President
Abraham Lincoln
Republican

A presidential election was held in Indiana on November 6, 1860, as part of the 1860 United States presidential election. The Republican ticket of the former U.S. representative from Illinois's 7th congressional district Abraham Lincoln and the senior U.S. senator from Maine Hannibal Hamlin defeated the Democratic ticket of the senior U.S. senator from Illinois Stephen A. Douglas and the governor of Georgia Herschel V. Johnson. The Southern Democratic ticket of the incumbent vice president John C. Breckinridge and the senior U.S. senator from Oregon Joseph Lane polled less than five percent of the vote, but narrowly carried Warrick County, the only county outside the slave states and the Far Western states of California and Oregon to report a plurality for the Southern Democrats. Lincoln defeated Douglas, Breckinridge, and Constitutional Unionist John Bell in the national election with 180 electoral votes.

== General election ==
=== Summary ===
Indiana chose 13 electors in a statewide general election. Nineteenth-century presidential elections used a form of block voting that allowed voters to modify the electoral list nominated by a political party before submitting their ballots. Because voters elected each member of the Electoral College individually, electors nominated by the same party often received differing numbers of votes as a consequence of voter rolloff, split-ticket voting, or electoral fusion. This table reflects the statewide popular vote as calculated by Michael J. Dubin.

1860 United States presidential election in Indiana
Party	Candidate	Votes	%	±%
Republican	Abraham Lincoln Hannibal Hamlin	139,013	51.14	▲11.05
Democratic	Stephen A. Douglas Herschel V. Johnson	115,166	42.37	▼8.04
Southern Democratic	John C. Breckinridge Joseph Lane	12,295	4.52	▲4.52
Constitutional Union	John Bell Edward Everett	5,339	1.96	▲1.96
Radical Abolitionist	Gerrit Smith Samuel McFarland	5	0.00	Steady
Total votes		271,818	100.00	

=== Results by county ===
County	Abraham Lincoln Republican		Stephen A. Douglas Democratic		John C. Breckinridge Southern Democratic		John Bell Constitutional Union		Total
County	Votes	Percent	Votes	Percent	Votes	Percent	Votes	Percent	Total
Adams	632	40.72	887	57.15	22	1.42	11	0.71	1,552
Allen	2,552	43.62	3,224	55.11	42	0.72	32	0.55	5,850
Bartholomew	1,769	47.62	1,846	49.69	66	1.78	34	0.92	3,715
Benton	375	60.10	235	37.66	6	0.96	8	1.28	624
Blackford	275	37.57	408	55.74	40	5.46	9	1.23	732
Boone	1,699	50.93	941	28.21	649	19.45	47	1.41	3,336
Brown	301	28.21	729	68.32	31	2.91	6	0.56	1,067
Carroll	1,590	52.05	1,446	47.33	5	0.16	14	0.46	3,055
Cass	1,874	49.77	1,727	45.87	130	3.45	34	0.90	3,765
Clinton	1,454	49.15	1,437	48.58	61	2.06	6	0.20	2,958
Clark	1,369	36.29	1,837	48.70	250	6.63	316	8.38	3,772
Clay	889	38.62	1,316	57.17	47	2.04	50	2.17	2,302
Crawford	778	46.53	844	50.48	8	0.48	42	2.51	1,672
DeKalb	1,550	53.17	1,339	45.93	2	0.07	24	0.82	2,915
Delaware	1,933	62.96	1,029	33.52	98	3.19	10	0.33	3,070
Daviess	934	39.83	749	31.94	529	22.56	133	5.67	2,345
Dearborn	2,004	44.30	2,378	52.56	51	1.13	91	2.01	4,524
Decatur	2,028	55.00	1,546	41.93	93	2.52	20	0.54	3,687
Dubois	301	18.02	1,347	80.66	2	0.12	20	1.20	1,670
Elkhart	2,471	55.69	1,938	43.68	27	0.61	1	0.02	4,437
Fayette	1,343	58.19	917	39.73	39	1.69	9	0.39	2,308
Floyd	1,151	33.31	1,888	54.65	96	2.78	320	9.26	3,455
Fountain	1,656	50.02	1,360	41.08	269	8.12	26	0.79	3,311
Franklin	1,695	42.11	2,272	56.45	49	1.22	9	0.22	4,025
Fulton	1,019	50.00	991	48.63	22	1.08	6	0.29	2,038
Gibson	1,295	43.15	1,565	52.15	29	0.97	112	3.73	3,001
Grant	1,668	56.16	1,223	41.18	33	1.11	46	1.55	2,970
Greene	1,420	47.97	1,316	44.46	204	6.89	20	0.68	2,960
Hamilton	2,195	63.79	1,144	33.25	98	2.85	4	0.12	3,441
Hancock	1,201	46.19	1,289	49.58	97	3.73	13	0.50	2,600
Harrison	1,593	45.59	1,848	52.89	36	1.03	17	0.49	3,494
Hendricks	2,050	59.98	1,083	31.69	244	7.14	41	1.20	3,418
Henry	2,926	69.04	1,206	28.46	90	2.12	16	0.38	4,238
Howard	1,589	62.98	875	34.68	34	1.35	25	0.99	2,523
Huntington	1,582	51.87	1,402	45.97	52	1.70	14	0.46	3,050
Jackson	1,185	38.50	1,740	56.53	117	3.80	36	1.17	3,078
Jasper	534	63.88	278	33.25	7	0.84	17	2.03	836
Jay	1,135	50.90	1,077	48.30	12	0.54	6	0.27	2,230
Jefferson	2,644	58.70	1,146	25.44	564	12.52	150	3.33	4,504
Jennings	1,649	57.92	830	29.15	326	11.45	42	1.48	2,847
Johnson	1,303	42.15	1,392	45.03	336	10.87	60	1.94	3,091
Knox	1,570	47.30	1,666	50.23	42	1.27	39	1.18	3,317
Kosciusko	2,298	60.31	1,500	39.37	9	0.24	3	0.08	3,810
LaGrange	1,695	68.62	749	30.32	10	0.40	16	0.65	2,470
Lake	1,225	72.06	455	26.76	20	1.18	0	0.00	1,700
LaPorte	3,167	61.25	1,504	29.09	478	9.24	22	0.43	5,171
Lawrence	1,100	41.97	784	29.91	530	20.22	207	7.90	2,621
Madison	1,709	46.75	1,841	50.36	70	1.91	36	0.98	3,656
Marion	5,024	57.38	3,252	37.14	318	3.63	161	1.84	8,755
Marshall	1,426	52.33	1,273	46.72	24	0.88	2	0.07	2,725
Martin	516	34.89	754	50.98	153	10.34	56	3.79	1,479
Miami	1,835	52.90	1,608	46.35	26	0.75	0	0.00	3,469
Monroe	1,198	50.48	716	30.17	395	16.65	64	2.70	2,373
Montgomery	2,366	49.38	2,279	47.57	68	1.42	78	1.63	4,791
Morgan	1,775	52.65	1,516	44.97	65	1.93	15	0.44	3,371
Newton	305	56.59	189	35.06	44	8.16	1	0.19	539
Noble	1,742	56.12	1,320	42.53	38	1.22	4	0.45	3,104
Ohio	301	29.71	335	33.07	203	20.04	174	17.18	1,013
Orange	849	38.17	1,114	50.09	176	7.91	85	3.82	2,224
Owen	1,140	43.20	1,293	49.00	88	3.33	118	4.47	2,639
Parke	1,898	56.52	1,321	39.34	55	1.64	84	2.50	3,358
Perry	926	46.56	897	45.10	6	0.30	160	8.04	1,989
Pike	894	47.73	882	47.09	58	3.10	39	2.08	1,873
Porter	1,529	56.82	1,128	41.92	28	1.04	6	0.22	2,691
Posey	1,055	36.71	1,128	39.25	523	18.20	168	5.85	2,874
Pulaski	571	45.86	663	53.25	4	0.32	7	0.56	1,245
Putnam	1,888	45.85	1,747	42.42	360	8.74	123	2.99	4,118
Randolph	2,295	64.81	1,180	33.32	56	1.58	10	0.28	3,541
Ripley	1,988	54.36	1,458	39.87	174	4.76	37	1.01	3,657
Rush	1,757	51.87	1,119	33.04	476	14.05	35	1.03	3,387
St. Joseph	2,363	60.98	1,489	38.43	23	0.59	0	0.00	3,875
Scott	650	46.07	447	31.68	262	18.57	52	3.69	1,411
Shelby	1,900	47.32	2,047	50.98	43	1.07	25	0.62	4,015
Spencer	1,296	47.11	1,108	40.28	172	6.25	175	6.36	2,751
Starke	190	43.48	231	52.86	14	3.20	2	0.46	437
Steuben	1,560	71.01	547	24.90	82	3.73	8	0.36	2,197
Sullivan	856	29.55	1,858	54.82	128	4.42	55	1.90	2,897
Switzerland	734	33.08	476	21.45	499	22.49	510	22.98	2,219
Tippecanoe	3,480	58.91	2,276	38.53	117	1.98	34	0.58	5,907
Tipton	780	48.00	822	50.58	20	1.23	3	0.18	1,625
Union	849	55.13	652	42.34	36	2.34	3	0.19	1,540
Vanderburgh	1,867	47.95	1,542	39.60	183	4.70	302	7.76	3,894
Vermillion	1,125	56.42	818	41.02	17	0.85	34	1.71	1,994
Vigo	2,429	50.49	2,127	44.21	44	0.91	211	4.39	4,811
Wabash	2,287	64.82	1,142	32.37	79	2.24	20	0.57	3,528
Warren	1,412	63.35	769	34.50	33	1.48	15	0.67	2,229
Wayne	4,234	67.31	1,784	28.36	164	2.61	108	1.72	6,290
Wells	1,099	54.51	909	45.09	6	0.30	2	0.10	2,016
White	993	52.82	811	43.14	67	3.56	9	0.48	1,880
Whitley	1,133	50.65	1,067	47.70	33	1.48	4	0.18	2,237
Warrick	745	30.53	784	32.13	816	33.44	95	3.89	2,440
Washington	1,378	40.03	1,985	57.67	48	1.39	31	0.90	3,442
TOTAL	139,013	51.14	115,166	42.37	12,295	4.52	5,339	1.96	271,813

== See also ==
- United States presidential elections in Indiana

== Bibliography ==
- "1860 Electoral College Results". National Archives.
- Dubin, Michael J. (2002). United States Presidential Elections, 1788-1860. Jefferson, NC: McFarland & Co. ISBN 978-0-7864-6422-7.
- Lampi, Philip J. (n.d.). "Electoral College". A New Nation Votes. American Antiquarian Society.
- Madison, James H. (1986). The Indiana Way: A State History. Bloomington: Indiana University Press.
- Ratcliffe, Donald J. (Spring 2014). "Popular Preferences in the Presidential Election of 1824". Journal of the Early Republic. 34 (1): 45–77. JSTOR 24486931.
