= Marco, Indiana =

- Unincorporated community
- Location within Indiana Location within the United States
- Coordinates: 38°56′09″N 87°08′32″W
- Country: United States
- State: Indiana
- County: Greene
- Township: Stafford
- Elevation: 482 ft (147 m)
- ZIP code: 47443
- FIPS code: 18-46710
- GNIS feature ID: 438599

Marco is an unincorporated community in Stafford Township, Greene County, Indiana.

== History ==
The first settlement was made at Marco in about 1816. A post office was established at Marco in 1853, and remained in operation until it was discontinued in 1967.
