= Park, Indiana =

- Unincorporated community
- Location within Indiana Location within the United States
- Coordinates: 39°00′58″N 86°50′58″W
- Country: United States
- State: Indiana
- County: Greene
- Township: Richland
- Elevation: 663 ft (202 m)
- ZIP code: 47424
- FIPS code: 18-57960
- GNIS feature ID: 440869

Park is an unincorporated community in Richland Township, Greene County, Indiana.

== History ==
Park was named for the Parker family of pioneer settlers. A post office was established at Park in 1866, and remained in operation until it was discontinued in 1908.
