= Mineral City, Indiana =

- Unincorporated community
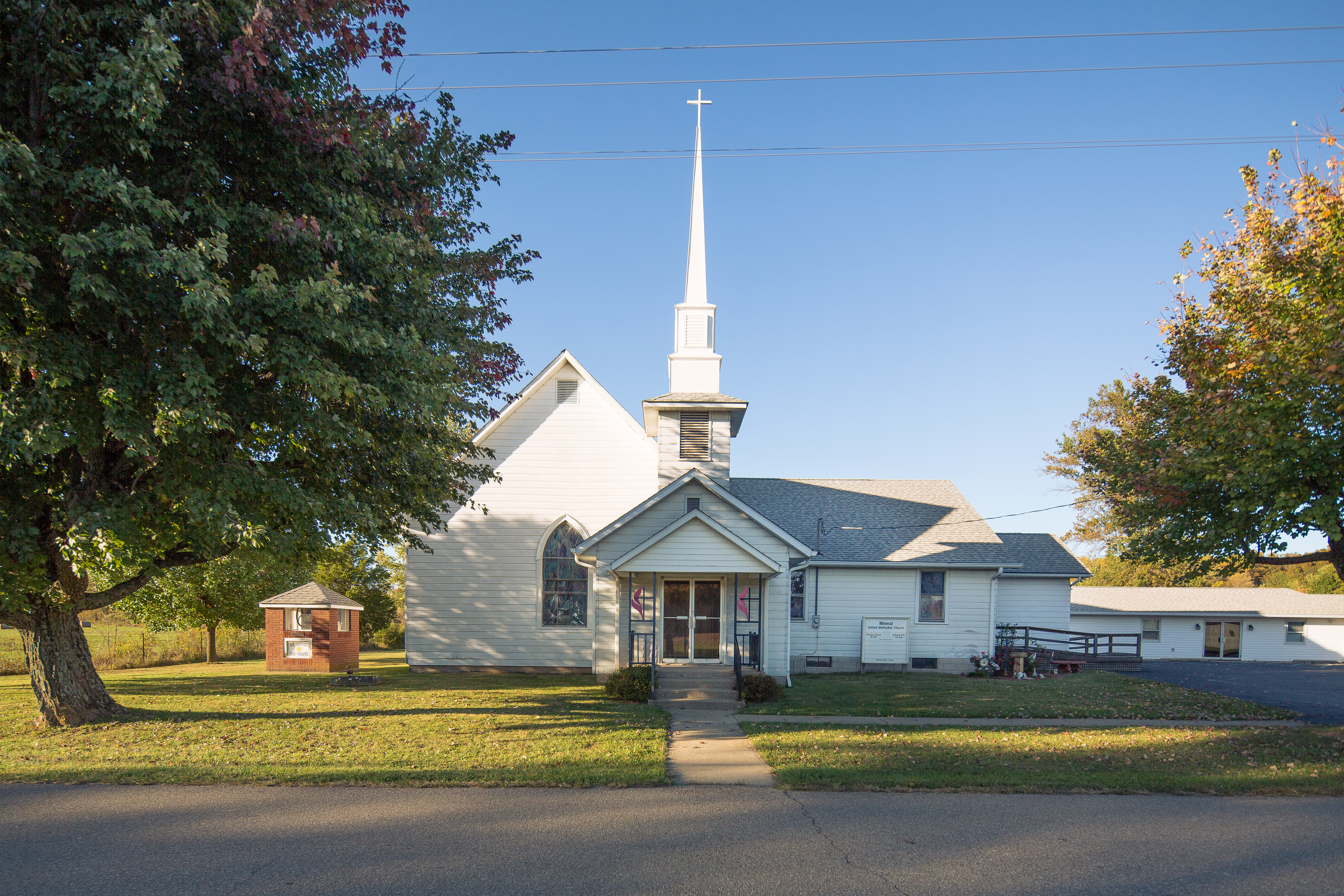

- Location within Indiana Location within the United States
- Coordinates: 38°59′39″N 86°52′48″W
- Country: United States
- State: Indiana
- County: Greene
- Township: Richland
- Elevation: 515 ft (157 m)
- ZIP code: 47424
- FIPS code: 18-49885
- GNIS feature ID: 439264

Mineral City is an unincorporated community in Richland Township, Greene County, Indiana.

== History ==
A post office was established at Mineral City in 1877, and remained in operation until it was discontinued in 1950. The post office was called Mineral in its final years.
