= Furnace, Indiana =

- Unincorporated community
- Location within Indiana Location within the United States
- Coordinates: 39°00′51″N 86°54′47″W
- Country: United States
- State: Indiana
- County: Greene
- Township: Richland
- Elevation: 561 ft (171 m)
- ZIP code: 47424
- FIPS code: 18-26160
- GNIS feature ID: 434906

Furnace is an unincorporated community in Richland Township, Greene County, Indiana.

== History ==
Furnace was named for the presence of an iron furnace.
