= Lyons, Indiana =

- Town
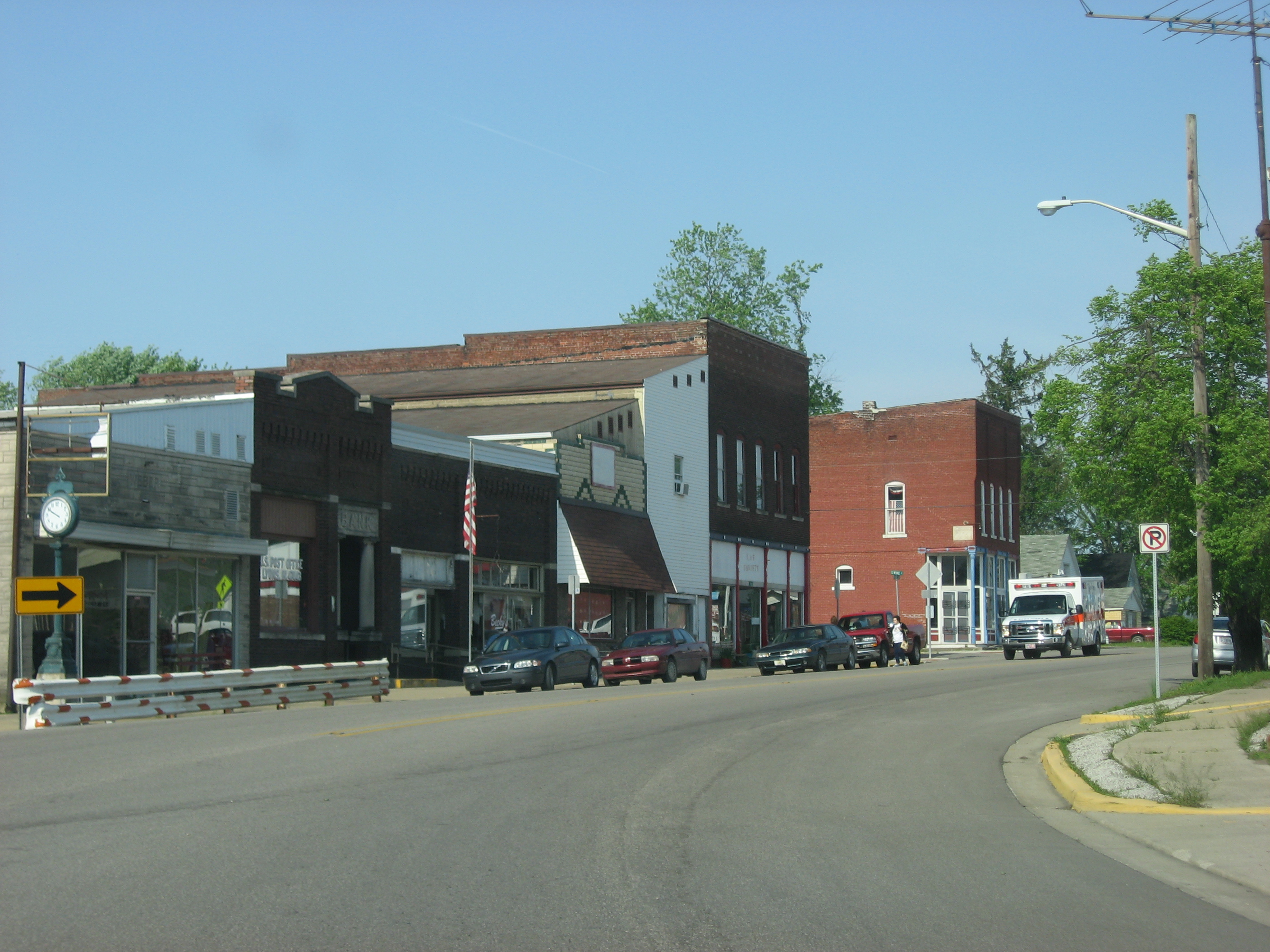
- Downtown Lyons

- Location of Lyons in Greene County, Indiana.
- Coordinates: 38°59′18″N 87°04′52″W
- Country: United States
- State: Indiana
- County: Greene
- Township: Washington
- Platted: 1869

Area
  - Total: 0.81 sq mi (2.09 km^{2})
  - Land: 0.81 sq mi (2.09 km^{2})
  - Water: 0 sq mi (0.00 km^{2})
- Elevation: 518 ft (158 m)

Population (2020)
  - Total: 625
  - Density: 774.8/sq mi (299.15/km^{2})
- Time zone: UTC-5 (EST)
  - Summer (DST): UTC-5 (EST)
- ZIP code: 47443
- Area code: 812
- FIPS code: 18-45504
- GNIS feature ID: 2396731

Lyons is a town in Washington Township, Greene County, Indiana, United States. The population was 625 at the 2020 census. It is part of the Bloomington, Indiana Metropolitan Statistical Area.

== History ==
Lyons was named in honor of Squire Joe Lyons, a county official, and platted in 1869. The Lyons post office opened in 1870.

As settlers moved into the town in the 1870s, they began to establish places of worship. The first church in the area was the Hicks Cumberland Presbyterian Church.

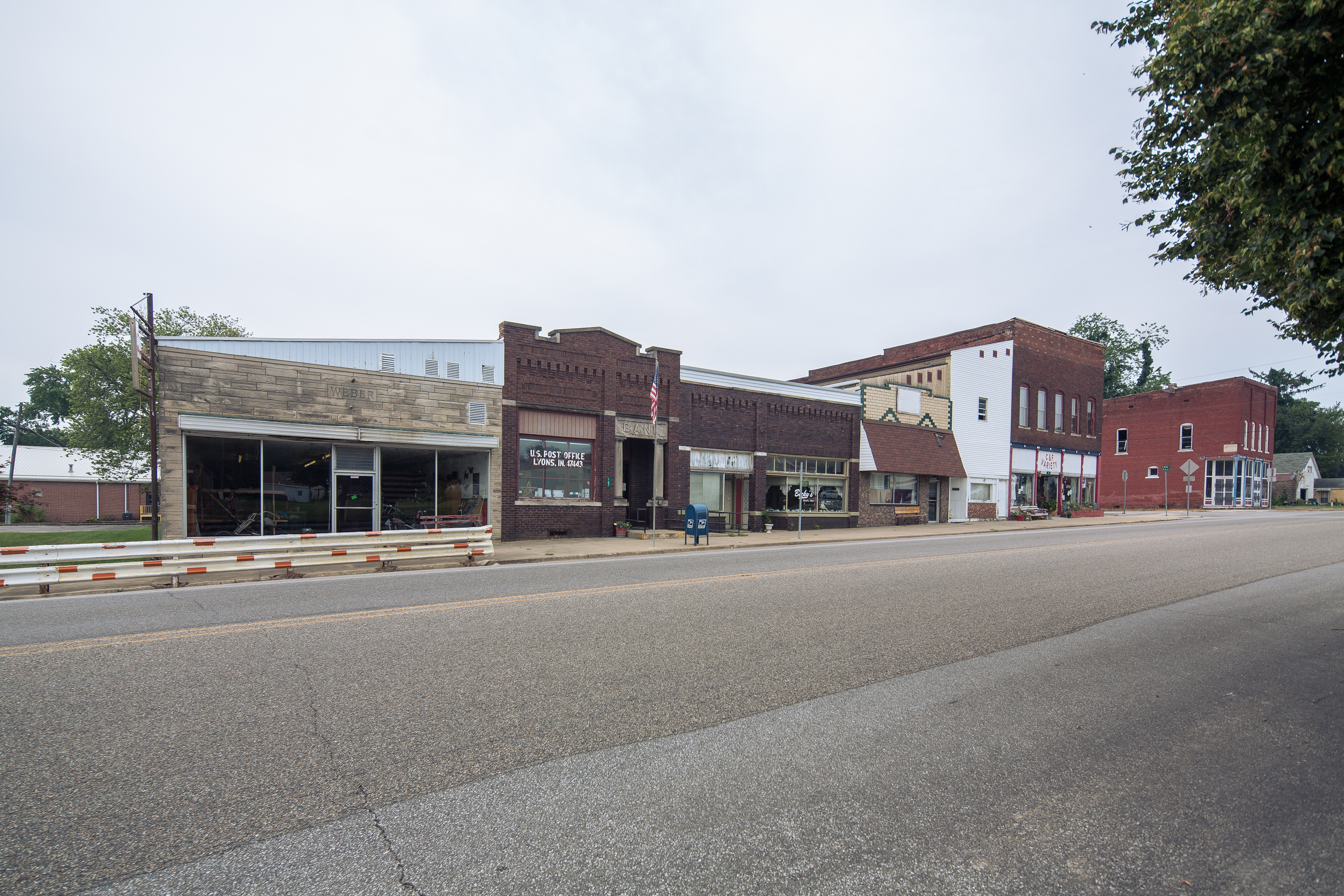
Photo from Small Town Indiana photo survey.

== Geography ==
According to the 2010 census, Lyons has a total area of 0.87 square miles (2.25 km^{2}), all land.

== Demographics ==
Historical population
| Census | Pop. | Note | %± |
|---|---|---|---|
| 1880 | 187 | | — |
| 1910 | 993 | | — |
| 1920 | 894 | | −10.0% |
| 1930 | 806 | | −9.8% |
| 1940 | 794 | | −1.5% |
| 1950 | 695 | | −12.5% |
| 1960 | 651 | | −6.3% |
| 1970 | 702 | | 7.8% |
| 1980 | 782 | | 11.4% |
| 1990 | 753 | | −3.7% |
| 2000 | 748 | | −0.7% |
| 2010 | 742 | | −0.8% |
| 2020 | 625 | | −15.8% |
U.S. Decennial Census

=== 2010 census ===
As of the census of 2010, there were 742 people, 270 households, and 175 families living in the town. The population density was 852.9 inhabitants per square mile (329.3/km^{2}). There were 310 housing units at an average density of 356.3 per square mile (137.6/km^{2}). The racial makeup of the town was 98.1% White, 0.1% African American, 0.5% Native American, 0.3% Asian, 0.1% from other races, and 0.8% from two or more races. Hispanic or Latino of any race were 1.5% of the population.

There were 270 households, of which 31.5% had children under the age of 18 living with them, 50.0% were married couples living together, 10.7% had a female householder with no husband present, 4.1% had a male householder with no wife present, and 35.2% were non-families. 29.6% of all households were made up of individuals, and 15.2% had someone living alone who was 65 years of age or older. The average household size was 2.53 and the average family size was 3.04.

The median age in the town was 43.3 years. 22.1% of residents were under the age of 18; 7.9% were between the ages of 18 and 24; 21.9% were from 25 to 44; 23.8% were from 45 to 64; and 24.3% were 65 years of age or older. The gender makeup of the town was 49.2% male and 50.8% female.

=== 2000 census ===
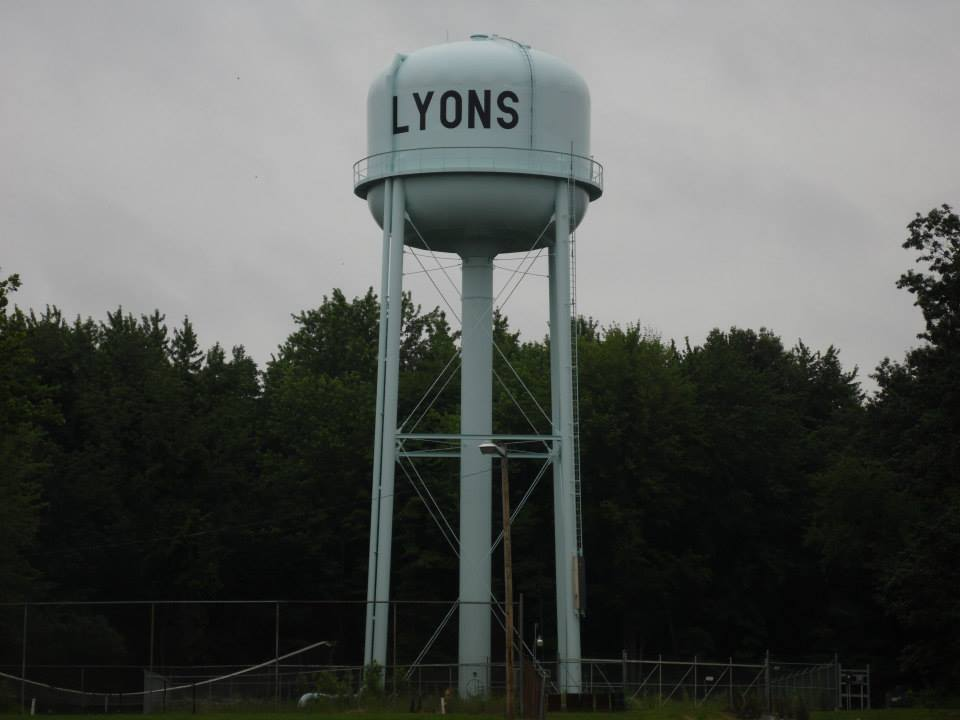
Lyons Water Tower

As of the census of 2000, there were 748 people, 281 households, and 198 families living in the town. The population density was 864.5 inhabitants per square mile (333.8/km^{2}). There were 322 housing units at an average density of 372.2 per square mile (143.7/km^{2}). The racial makeup of the town was 98.93% White, 0.27% Native American, 0.40% Asian, 0.13% from other races, and 0.27% from two or more races. Hispanic or Latino of any race were 0.80% of the population.

There were 281 households, out of which 34.2% had children under the age of 18 living with them, 54.1% were married couples living together, 11.0% had a female householder with no husband present, and 29.2% were non-families. 26.0% of all households were made up of individuals, and 15.3% had someone living alone who was 65 years of age or older. The average household size was 2.48 and the average family size was 2.93.

In the town, the population was spread out, with 26.1% under the age of 18, 7.1% from 18 to 24, 25.0% from 25 to 44, 21.5% from 45 to 64, and 20.3% who were 65 years of age or older. The median age was 38 years. For every 100 females, there were 87.5 males. For every 100 females age 18 and over, there were 79.5 males.

The median income for a household in the town was $25,592, and the median income for a family was $30,139. Males had a median income of $25,909 versus $18,125 for females. The per capita income for the town was $12,771. About 20.1% of families and 20.7% of the population were below the poverty line, including 31.7% of those under age 18 and 15.0% of those age 65 or over.
