= Switz City, Indiana =

- Town
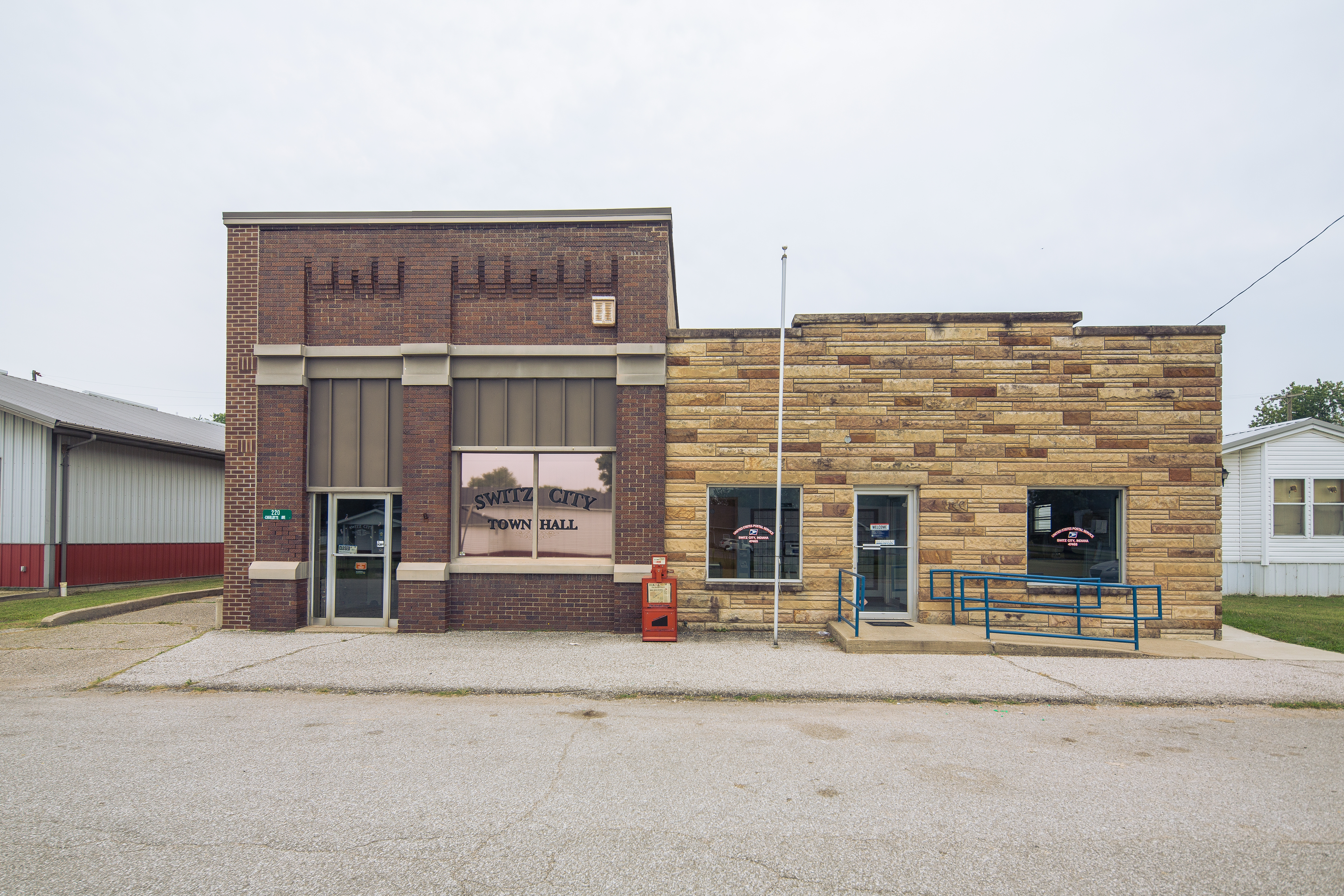

- Location of Switz City in Greene County, Indiana.
- Coordinates: 39°02′05″N 87°03′14″W
- Country: United States
- State: Indiana
- County: Greene
- Townships: Fairplay, Grant
- Founded: c. 1869

Area
  - Total: 0.20 sq mi (0.52 km^{2})
  - Land: 0.20 sq mi (0.52 km^{2})
  - Water: 0 sq mi (0.00 km^{2})
- Elevation: 532 ft (162 m)

Population (2020)
  - Total: 268
  - Density: 1,323.6/sq mi (511.05/km^{2})
- Time zone: UTC-5 (Eastern (EST))
  - Summer (DST): UTC-4 (EDT)
- ZIP code: 47465
- Area code: 812
- FIPS code: 18-74582
- GNIS feature ID: 2397692

Switz City is a town in Fairplay and Grant townships, Greene County, Indiana, United States. The population was 268 at the 2020 census. It is part of the Bloomington, Indiana, Metropolitan Statistical Area.

== History ==
The Switz City post office was established in 1869. The town was named in honor of one or more members of the Switz family of early settlers.

== Geography ==
According to the 2010 census, Switz City has a total area of 0.23 square miles (0.60 km^{2}), all land.

=== Climate ===
The climate in this area is characterized by hot, humid summers and generally mild to cool winters. According to the Köppen Climate Classification system, Switz City has a humid subtropical climate, abbreviated "Cfa" on climate maps.

== Demographics ==
Historical population
Census	Pop.	Note	%±
1880	187		—
1930	450		—
1940	405		−10.0%
1950	328		−19.0%
1960	339		3.4%
1970	301		−11.2%
1980	300		−0.3%
1990	257		−14.3%
2000	311		21.0%
2010	293		−5.8%
2020	268		−8.5%
U.S. Decennial Census

=== 2010 census ===
As of the census of 2010, there were 293 people, 123 households, and 87 families living in the town. The population density was 1,273.9 inhabitants per square mile (491.9/km^{2}). There were 136 housing units at an average density of 591.3 per square mile (228.3/km^{2}). The racial makeup of the town was 97.3% White, 0.7% African American, 0.7% Native American, 0.3% Asian, 0.7% from other races, and 0.3% from two or more races. Hispanic or Latino of any race were 2.0% of the population.

There were 123 households, of which 36.6% had children under the age of 18 living with them, 52.8% were married couples living together, 13.8% had a female householder with no husband present, 4.1% had a male householder with no wife present, and 29.3% were non-families. 26.8% of all households were made up of individuals, and 11.4% had someone living alone who was 65 years of age or older. The average household size was 2.38 and the average family size was 2.87.

The median age in the town was 37.9 years. 26.6% of residents were under the age of 18; 6.8% were between the ages of 18 and 24; 25.2% were from 25 to 44; 23.5% were from 45 to 64; and 17.7% were 65 years of age or older. The gender makeup of the town was 49.8% male and 50.2% female.

=== 2000 census ===
As of the census of 2000, there were 311 people, 125 households, and 90 families living in the town. The population density was 1,386.8 inhabitants per square mile (535.4/km^{2}). There were 137 housing units at an average density of 610.9 per square mile (235.9/km^{2}). The racial makeup of the town was 97.75% White, 0.32% African American, 0.64% Native American, 0.32% Pacific Islander, 0.96% from other races. Hispanic or Latino of any race were 1.29% of the population.

There were 125 households, out of which 33.6% had children under the age of 18 living with them, 56.0% were married couples living together, 12.8% had a female householder with no husband present, and 28.0% were non-families. 24.8% of all households were made up of individuals, and 8.0% had someone living alone who was 65 years of age or older. The average household size was 2.49 and the average family size was 2.88.

In the town, the population was spread out, with 25.1% under the age of 18, 7.4% from 18 to 24, 30.2% from 25 to 44, 23.2% from 45 to 64, and 14.1% who were 65 years of age or older. The median age was 35 years. For every 100 females, there were 95.6 males. For every 100 females age 18 and over, there were 95.8 males.

The median income for a household in the town was $33,750, and the median income for a family was $45,000. Males had a median income of $26,354 versus $21,563 for females. The per capita income for the town was $13,493. About 12.5% of families and 10.7% of the population were below the poverty line, including 8.8% of those under age 18 and 14.7% of those age 65 or over.

== Education ==
The town is served by two elementary schools: White River Valley Lyons and White River Valley Worthington. It is also the home of White River Valley High School.

== Notable people ==
Switz City was the hometown of three brothers - Andrew, A. J., and Matthew Graves - who played college basketball at Butler University. After college A. J. Graves played professionally overseas. Matthew Graves went into coaching and was the head coach of South Alabama from 2013 to 2018.
