= Newberry, Indiana =

- Town
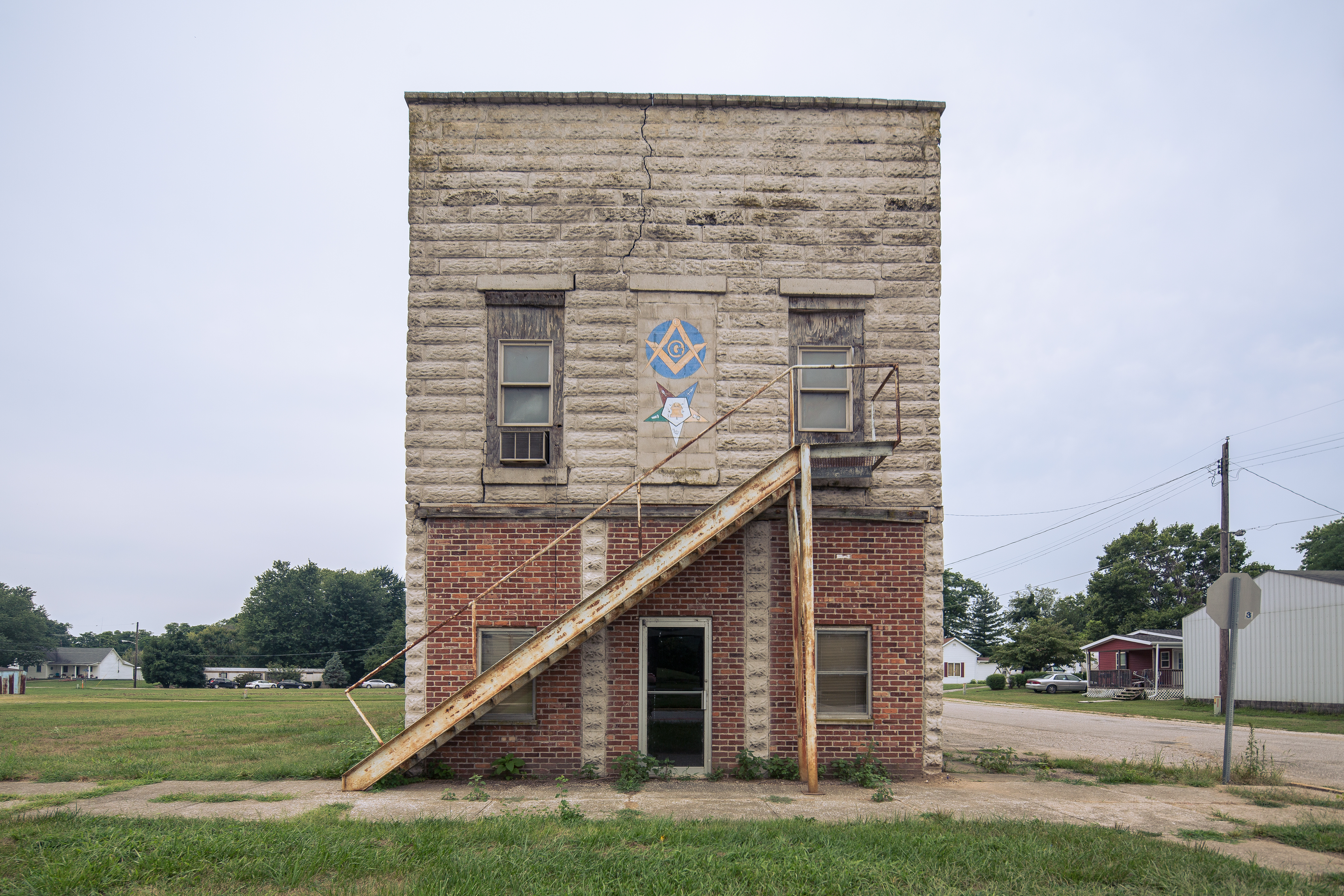

- Location of Newberry in Greene County, Indiana.
- Coordinates: 38°55′26″N 87°01′10″W
- Country: United States
- State: Indiana
- County: Greene
- Township: Cass

Area
  - Total: 0.48 sq mi (1.24 km^{2})
  - Land: 0.48 sq mi (1.24 km^{2})
  - Water: 0 sq mi (0.00 km^{2})
- Elevation: 558 ft (170 m)

Population (2020)
  - Total: 159
  - Density: 331.7/sq mi (128.07/km^{2})
- Time zone: UTC-5 (Eastern (EST))
  - Summer (DST): UTC-4 (EDT)
- ZIP code: 47449
- Area code: 812
- FIPS code: 18-52524
- GNIS feature ID: 2396811

Newberry is a town in Cass Township, Greene County, Indiana, United States. The population was 159 at the 2020 census. It is part of the Bloomington, Indiana Metropolitan Statistical Area.

== Geography ==
According to the 2010 census, Newberry has a total area of 0.49 square miles (1.27 km^{2}), all land.

=== Climate ===
The climate in this area is characterized by hot, humid summers and generally mild to cool winters. According to the Köppen Climate Classification system, Newberry has a humid subtropical climate, abbreviated "Cfa" on climate maps.

== Demographics ==
Historical population
Census	Pop.	Note	%±
1880	329		—
1910	455		—
1920	439		−3.5%
1930	306		−30.3%
1940	360		17.6%
1950	340		−5.6%
1960	256		−24.7%
1970	295		15.2%
1980	246		−16.6%
1990	207		−15.9%
2000	206		−0.5%
2010	193		−6.3%
2020	159		−17.6%
U.S. Decennial Census

=== 2010 census ===
As of the census of 2010, there were 193 people, 81 households, and 51 families living in the town. The population density was 393.9 inhabitants per square mile (152.1/km^{2}). There were 93 housing units at an average density of 189.8 per square mile (73.3/km^{2}). The racial makeup of the town was 97.9% White, 1.0% Native American, 0.5% Pacific Islander, and 0.5% from other races. Hispanic or Latino of any race were 2.6% of the population.

There were 81 households, of which 24.7% had children under the age of 18 living with them, 53.1% were married couples living together, 3.7% had a female householder with no husband present, 6.2% had a male householder with no wife present, and 37.0% were non-families. 32.1% of all households were made up of individuals, and 8.6% had someone living alone who was 65 years of age or older. The average household size was 2.38 and the average family size was 2.96.

The median age in the town was 47.8 years. 20.7% of residents were under the age of 18; 4.6% were between the ages of 18 and 24; 22.2% were from 25 to 44; 34.8% were from 45 to 64; and 17.6% were 65 years of age or older. The gender makeup of the town was 49.2% male and 50.8% female.

=== 2000 census ===
As of the census of 2000, there were 206 people, 93 households, and 59 families living in the town. The population density was 420.9 inhabitants per square mile (162.5/km^{2}). There were 104 housing units at an average density of 212.5 per square mile (82.0/km^{2}). The racial makeup of the town was 98.54% White, 0.49% African American, and 0.97% from two or more races. Hispanic or Latino of any race were 0.49% of the population.

There were 93 households, out of which 30.1% had children under the age of 18 living with them, 52.7% were married couples living together, 6.5% had a female householder with no husband present, and 35.5% were non-families. 35.5% of all households were made up of individuals, and 19.4% had someone living alone who was 65 years of age or older. The average household size was 2.22 and the average family size was 2.82.

In the town, the population was spread out, with 21.4% under the age of 18, 7.3% from 18 to 24, 25.2% from 25 to 44, 30.1% from 45 to 64, and 16.0% who were 65 years of age or older. The median age was 42 years. For every 100 females, there were 98.1 males. For every 100 females age 18 and over, there were 88.4 males.

The median income for a household in the town was $36,964, and the median income for a family was $45,833. Males had a median income of $32,321 versus $22,031 for females. The per capita income for the town was $18,313. About 6.3% of families and 12.9% of the population were below the poverty line, including 10.3% of those under the age of eighteen and 25.9% of those 65 or over.
