= Old Clifty Church =

Church building in Indiana, United States

Coordinates: 38°58′35.9″N 86°45′40.0″W

Old Clifty Church is an American Civil War era log building in rural Greene County, Indiana. Today it is a non-denominational public event space maintained by the Old Clifty Memorial Association, but it began as a Protestant Methodist Church when completed in 1867. Construction began in 1858 after land was donated by Michael Dobson but construction was on hiatus until men returned from the Civil War.

White Poplar logs, some measuring 50 feet long and 3 feet in diameter, felled from the surrounding area were used to construct the walls. Several repairs have been made to the structure over the years but only one log has been replaced (a short length midway up wall behind the pulpit). The building was listed on the National Register of Historic Places in 2020.
