= Victoria, Indiana =

Victoria, Greene County, Indiana
- Unincorporated community
- Location within Indiana Location within the United States
- Coordinates: 39°02′47″N 87°13′22″W
- Country: United States
- State: Indiana
- County: Greene
- Township: Stockton
- Elevation: 538 ft (164 m)
- ZIP code: 47848
- FIPS code: 18-79064
- GNIS feature ID: 445276

Victoria is an unincorporated community in Stockton Township, Greene County, Indiana.

== History ==
Victoria took its name from the Old Victoria Mine.
