= Doans, Indiana =

Doans
- Unincorporated community
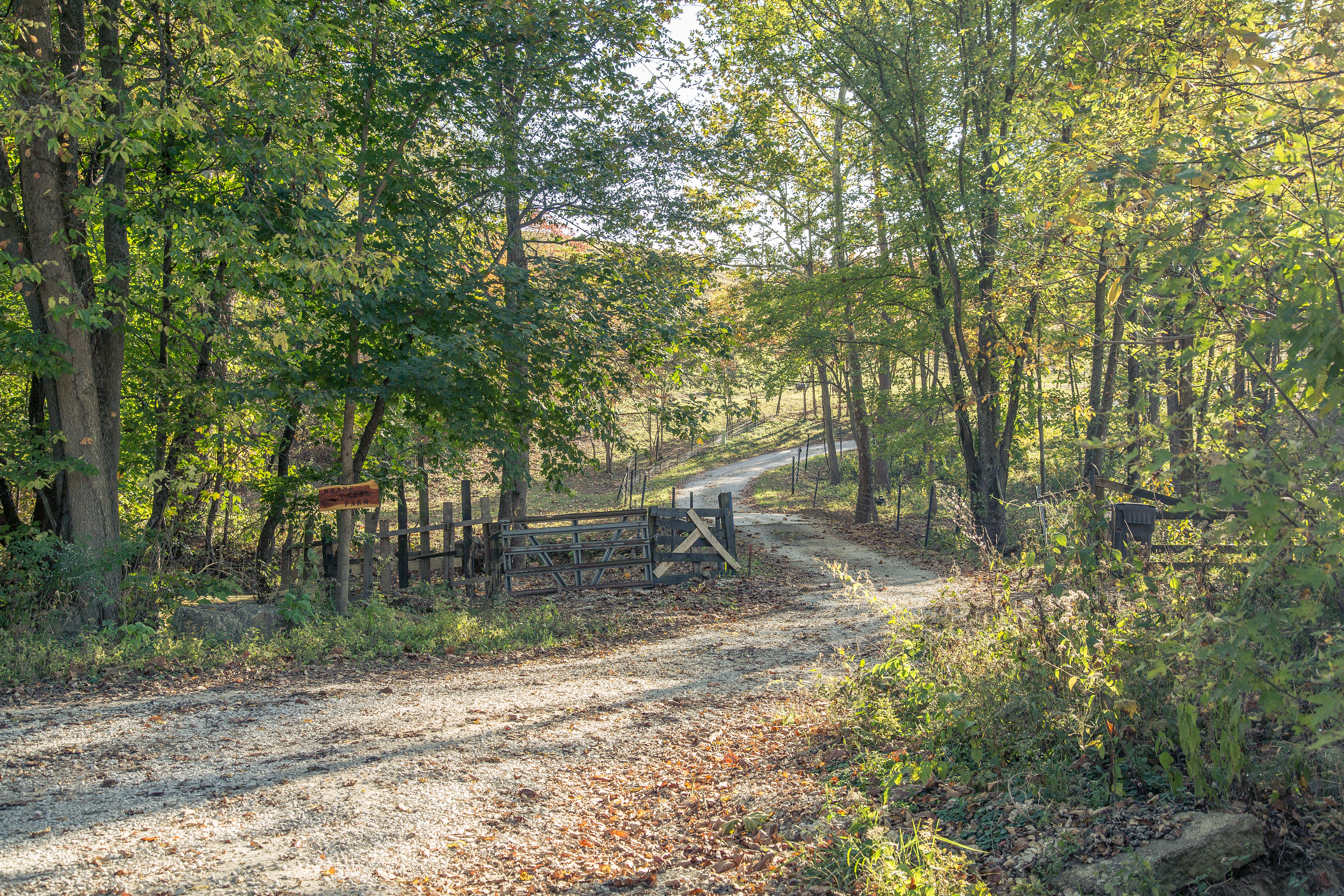

- Location within Indiana Location within the United States
- Coordinates: 38°55′09″N 86°50′58″W
- Country: United States
- State: Indiana
- County: Greene
- Township: Taylor
- Elevation: 610 ft (190 m)
- Time zone: UTC-5 (Eastern (EST))
  - Summer (DST): UTC-4 (EDT)
- ZIP code: 47457
- Area code: 812
- GNIS feature ID: 433586

Doans is an unincorporated community in Taylor Township, Greene County, in the U.S. state of Indiana.

== History ==
Doans took its name from Doans Creek. A post office was established at Doans in 1899, and remained in operation until it was discontinued in 1971.
