= Elliston, Indiana =

- Unincorporated community
- Location within Indiana Location within the United States
- Coordinates: 39°01′40″N 86°58′15″W
- Country: United States
- State: Indiana
- County: Greene
- Township: Fairplay
- Elevation: 535 ft (163 m)
- ZIP code: 47424
- GNIS feature ID: 434112

Elliston is an unincorporated community in Fairplay Township, Greene County, Indiana, United States.

== History ==
Elliston was named for Mr. Ellis, a pioneer. A post office was established at Elliston in 1885, and remained in operation until it was discontinued in 1910. It was the site of a rare triple crossing, a place where three railroad lines cross in the same location. The Bedford and Bloomfield Branch of the Monon Railroad, the Evansville and Indiana Railroad (later part of the New York Central Railroad), and the Indianapolis Southern/Illinois Central Railroad all met at a small station owned by the E&I. The Monon and E&I crossed at grade while the IS/IC crossed directly overhead. Only the station and IS/IC bridge remain today. The bridge is still in active service as part of the Indiana Rail Road's Indianapolis Subdivision.

== Geography ==
It is located on the west side of the White River.
