= Calvertville, Indiana =

- Unincorporated community
- Location within Indiana Location within the United States
- Coordinates: 39°06′59″N 86°54′14″W
- Country: United States
- State: Indiana
- County: Greene
- Township: Highland
- Elevation: 587 ft (179 m)
- ZIP code: 47471
- FIPS code: 18-09838
- GNIS feature ID: 431992

Calvertville is an unincorporated community in Highland Township, Greene County, Indiana, United States.

== History ==
A post office was established at Calvertville in 1888, and remained in operation until it was discontinued in 1910. John O. Calvert served as the first postmaster.
