= Cass Township, Greene County, Indiana =

Cass Township
- Township
- Location in Greene County
- Coordinates: 38°55′39″N 87°00′37″W
- Country: United States
- State: Indiana
- County: Greene

Government
  - Type: Indiana township

Area
  - Total: 18.08 sq mi (46.8 km^{2})
  - Land: 17.62 sq mi (45.6 km^{2})
  - Water: 0.45 sq mi (1.2 km^{2}) 2.49%
- Elevation: 486 ft (148 m)

Population (2020)
  - Total: 299
  - Density: 17.0/sq mi (6.55/km^{2})
- GNIS feature ID: 0453164

Cass Township is one of fifteen townships in Greene County, Indiana, USA. As of the 2020 census, its population was 299, down from 358 at 2010.

Historical population
Census	Pop.	Note	%±
1890	847		—
1900	899		6.1%
1910	860		−4.3%
1920	756		−12.1%
1930	634		−16.1%
1940	670		5.7%
1950	603		−10.0%
1960	447		−25.9%
1970	426		−4.7%
1980	418		−1.9%
1990	386		−7.7%
2000	392		1.6%
2010	358		−8.7%
2020	299		−16.5%
Source: US Decennial Census

== Geography ==
According to the 2010 census, the township has a total area of 18.08 square miles (46.8 km^{2}), of which 17.62 square miles (45.6 km^{2}) (or 97.46%) is land and 0.45 square miles (1.2 km^{2}) (or 2.49%) is water. The streams of Doans Creek, Gilbert Creek, Mud Creek and Woodhouse Branch run through this township.

=== Cities and towns ===
- Newberry

=== Adjacent townships ===
- Taylor Township (east)
- Madison Township, Daviess County (southeast)
- Elmore Township, Daviess County (southwest)
- Vigo Township, Knox County (west)
- Washington Township (northwest)

=== Cemeteries ===
The township contains three cemeteries: Gilbreath, Old Slinkard and Slinkard.

=== Major highways ===
- Indiana State Road 57
