= Vicksburg, Indiana =

- Census-designated place
- Location within Indiana Location within the United States
- Coordinates: 39°05′18″N 87°11′53″W
- Country: United States
- State: Indiana
- County: Greene
- Township: Wright
- Elevation: 607 ft (185 m)
- ZIP code: 47441
- FIPS code: 18-79028
- GNIS feature ID: 445273

Vicksburg is an unincorporated community in Wright Township, Greene County, Indiana.

== History ==
Vicksburg was named for Victoria Hanna, the daughter of a prominent settler. A post office was established at Vicksburg in 1901, and remained in operation until it was discontinued in 1935.

== Demographics ==
Historical population
Census	Pop.	Note	%±
2023 (est.)	185

The United States Census Bureau defined Vicksburg as a census designated place in the 2022 American Community Survey.
