= Hashtown, Indiana =

- unincorporated town
- Location within Indiana Location within the United States
- Coordinates: 39°01′26″N 86°55′23″W
- Country: United States
- State: Indiana
- County: Greene
- Township: Richland
- Elevation: 541 ft (165 m)
- ZIP code: 47424
- FIPS code: 18-32422
- GNIS feature ID: 2830387

Hashtown is an unincorporated town in Richland Township, Greene County, Indiana, tallied by the United States Census as a Census-designated place.

Hashtown has been noted for its unusual place name.

== Demographics ==
The United States Census Bureau delineated Hashtown as a census designated place in the 2022 American Community Survey.
