= Summit, Greene County, Indiana =

- Unincorporated community
- Location within Indiana Location within the United States
- Coordinates: 39°01′52″N 87°11′58″W
- Country: United States
- State: Indiana
- County: Greene
- Township: Stockton
- Elevation: 512 ft (156 m)
- ZIP code: 47441
- FIPS code: 18-74083
- GNIS feature ID: 444390

Summit is an unincorporated community in Stockton Township, Greene County, Indiana. It was named for the former Summit Mine located there in the late 19th and early 20th centuries.
