= Highland Township, Greene County, Indiana =

Highland Township
- Township
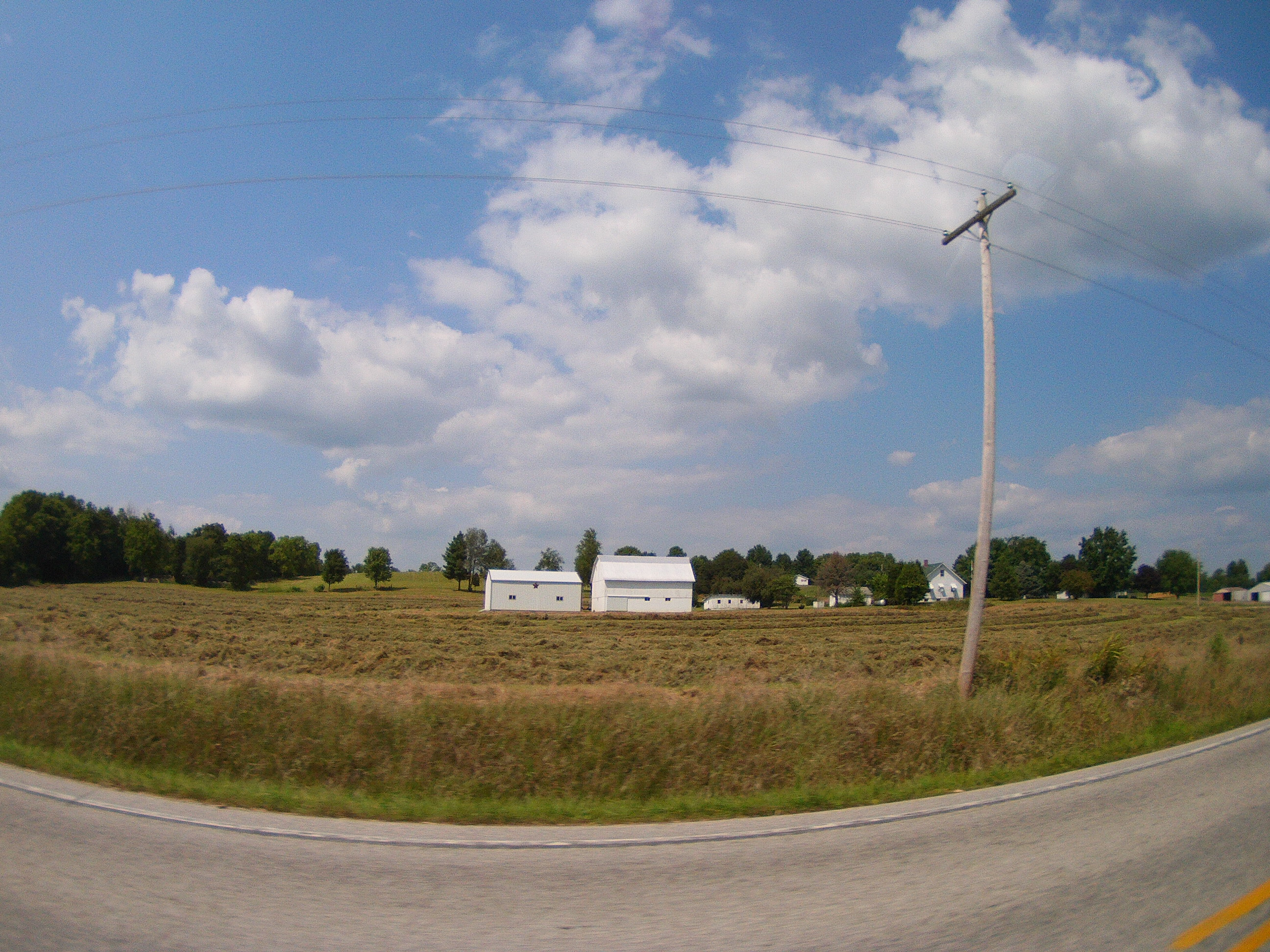
- Countryside in Highland Township

- Location in Greene County
- Coordinates: 39°07′17″N 86°53′13″W
- Country: United States
- State: Indiana
- County: Greene

Government
  - Type: Indiana township

Area
  - Total: 32.69 sq mi (84.7 km^{2})
  - Land: 32.47 sq mi (84.1 km^{2})
  - Water: 0.22 sq mi (0.57 km^{2}) 0.67%
- Elevation: 545 ft (166 m)

Population (2020)
  - Total: 688
  - Density: 21.2/sq mi (8.18/km^{2})
- GNIS feature ID: 0453411

Highland Township is one of fifteen townships in Greene County, Indiana, USA. As of the 2020 census, its population was 688, down from 718 at 2010.

Historical population
Census	Pop.	Note	%±
1890	1,143		—
1900	980		−14.3%
1910	977		−0.3%
1920	897		−8.2%
1930	742		−17.3%
1940	753		1.5%
1950	595		−21.0%
1960	494		−17.0%
1970	513		3.8%
1980	581		13.3%
1990	583		0.3%
2000	655		12.3%
2010	718		9.6%
2020	688		−4.2%
Source: US Decennial Census

== Geography ==
According to the 2010 census, the township has a total area of 32.69 square miles (84.7 km^{2}), of which 32.47 square miles (84.1 km^{2}) (or 99.33%) is land and 0.22 square miles (0.57 km^{2}) (or 0.67%) is water. The streams of Camp Creek, Clark Creek, Dead Horse Branch, Goose Creek, Jim Creek and Kelly Branch run through this township.

=== Unincorporated towns ===
- Calvertville
- Tulip

(This list is based on USGS data and may include former settlements.)

=== Adjacent townships ===
- Franklin Township, Owen County (north)
- Beech Creek Township (east)
- Richland Township (south)
- Fairplay Township (southwest)
- Jefferson Township (west)

=== Cemeteries ===
The township contains nine cemeteries: Bucher, Calvertville, Goodwin, Kelley, Owens, Snyder, Stalcup, Wall and Walnut Grove.

=== Major highways ===
- SR 157

== Education ==
It is in the Bloomfield School District.
