= White Rose, Indiana =

White Rose
- Unincorporated community
- Location within Indiana Location within the United States
- Coordinates: 39°01′52″N 87°13′22″W
- Country: United States
- State: Indiana
- County: Greene
- Elevation: 499 ft (152 m)
- Time zone: UTC-5 (Eastern (EST))
  - Summer (DST): UTC-4 (EDT)
- Area code: 812
- GNIS feature ID: 445963

White Rose is an unincorporated community in Greene County, Indiana, in the United States.

== History ==
White Rose took its name from the White Rose coal mine.
