= Maryland Ridge Community (Indiana) =

Unincorporated community in Indiana, U.S.

Maryland Ridge in Indiana was an unincorporated community of settlers from Calvert County, Maryland, in the early 19th century. The settlers came to Indiana after the War of 1812 in successive waves between 1818 and 1839. One community where they settled became known as Maryland Ridge. The geographic area follows the ridges and streams of Indian Creek along the Monroe-Greene County line.

Ancestral roots in Indiana's Maryland Ridge community would include the family settlement of writer Booth Tarkington, whose great-grandparents Jesse H. Tarkington (1767–1854) and Mary Tarkington (1773–1859) were buried in Keller Cemetery there; the home and family farmstead of country music legend Joe Edwards, who was born on the site outside of Stanford, Indiana; and Hoagy Carmichael, a descendant of the 1826 Carmichael Party migration.

The first land entries in Center Township, Greene County, Indiana: John Storms, on Section 36 (in the southeastern part), in October 1816; Isaac Storms, on the same section, in December 1816; William Carter, on Section 25, in December 1817; Abel Burlingame, on Section 35, in August 1818; Daniel Rollins, on Section 1 (in the northeast part), in 1820; John Gardner, on the same section, in 1820; Garret Gibson, on Section 10, in 1822; and Joseph Burch, on Section 9, in 1826.

In the aftermath of the War of 1812, Joseph and his brother Benjamin Freeland where shipbuilders and former slave holders in Maryland who migrated west by 1817. Six named families from Calvert County, Maryland migrated at this time among them including Joseph and Lydia Richardson Freeland, Judge John Sedwick, Daniel and Rebecca Rawlings, Zebulon and Mary Whaley Alexander, and possibly others. The constitution of Indiana did not allow slavery, but some settlers arriving in the state simply "indentured" individuals for a period of time upon entering the state. John Sedwick made such a contract with his "negro woman", Anaca Johnson on June 1, 1820. Where as Joseph Freeland had purchased several large sections of Franklin Township around the current location of Freedom Indiana where many waves of African Americans settled directly from 1817 to 1850. According to Pioneer Methodist Preacher Joseph Tarkington's autobiography, published in 1899, Joseph Freeland and his brother Benjamin initially moved from Maryland to what is now Indian Creek Township in Monroe County in 1817.

The second and largest migration of settlers, the Carmichael Party, to the area appears to have originated in 1826 from Surry and Stokes Counties, North Carolina. The great number of these families appear to have direct ties to Calvert County, Maryland in at least one of three basic forms: they had previously lived in Calvert County; had brothers and sisters in Calvert County, or had married a spouse in or from Calvert County, Maryland.

The Greene County Chapel United Methodist Church located just west of the Monroe-Greene County line was started in 1834 when a group of neighbors from Calvert County, Maryland came to Indiana and settled in Beech Creek Township. The community where they settled became known as Maryland Ridge, and the worshipers called themselves the Calvert Society. 6 families made up the group; Gardners, Bakers, Whaleys, Carmichaels, Breedens and the Fowlers.

The Calvert Society met in homes until a log church was erected in 1839. The land was deeded to the trustees; John Gardner Sr., Samuel Hite, Cleverly Day, Isaac Gardner and Moses Whaley. According to church records there was a debate as to whether to build the church in Stanford or 'on the hill' west of Stanford. The hill was chosen, and in 1839 Joseph Whaley and Allen Sparks deeded the property for the Church, and the first log church in the area was built. The Calvert Society, feeling they were on the 'right' side of the anti-slavery issue, kept the traditional name of the Methodist Church, calling it the Methodist Episcopal Church.

The fourth and final group arrived in 1839 from Virginia. This group was led by Randolph Ross who built the Randolph Ross and Sonís Virginia Iron Works which became a touchstone of the early Maryland Ridge Community. Along Indian Creek on the very edge of a field cleared by the settlers, and purchased on contract from George Adams, Benjamin Freeland's son-in-law, Ross built the blast furnace. According to the abstract of the present owner, Benjamin Freeland deeded the property to his son-in-law George Adams for his 'iron works venture'. Adams then sold the property on contract to Ross. In 1839 Randolph Ross was land granted or bought on contract a total of 156 acres along Indian Creek. By 1840 he was the largest single tax payer in both Greene and Monroe Counties.

== Geography ==
The settlement is not well documented in local histories. The Maryland Ridge community is located in a three to seven mile wide band along the Monroe and Greene County line in south-central Indiana, and includes roughly the vicinity between the towns of Elwren, Stanford, and Buena Vista in Western Monroe County; and Hendricksville, Solsberry, and Hobbieville in Eastern Greene County. It appears that the actual larger landscape based on the period of settlement encompasses no less than 75 sections of land and 48,000 acres. 39.08°N 86.66°W.
