= Beehunter, Indiana =

Rail junction and former station in US

Coordinates: 38.95616°N 87.12112°W

Beehunter is a rail junction and former station in Greene County, Indiana, in the United States.

== History ==
Beehunter was a junction between the Indianapolis and Vincennes Railroad and the Cleveland, Cincinnati, Chicago, and St. Louis Railroad, and was an important switching point for miners traveling between coal fields. In addition to the station, Beehunter had a general store and restaurant for travelers. However, the population was never more than a single family of four. Beehunter took its name from Beehunter Creek, or possibly from the abundance of bees on the wildflowers in the nearby marsh, which attracted visitors in search of beeswax and honey.

Beehunter remains an active rail junction, but is now a point where two branches converge; there is no longer a crossing of the two lines.
