= Richland-Plummer Creek Covered Bridge =

- U.S. National Register of Historic Places
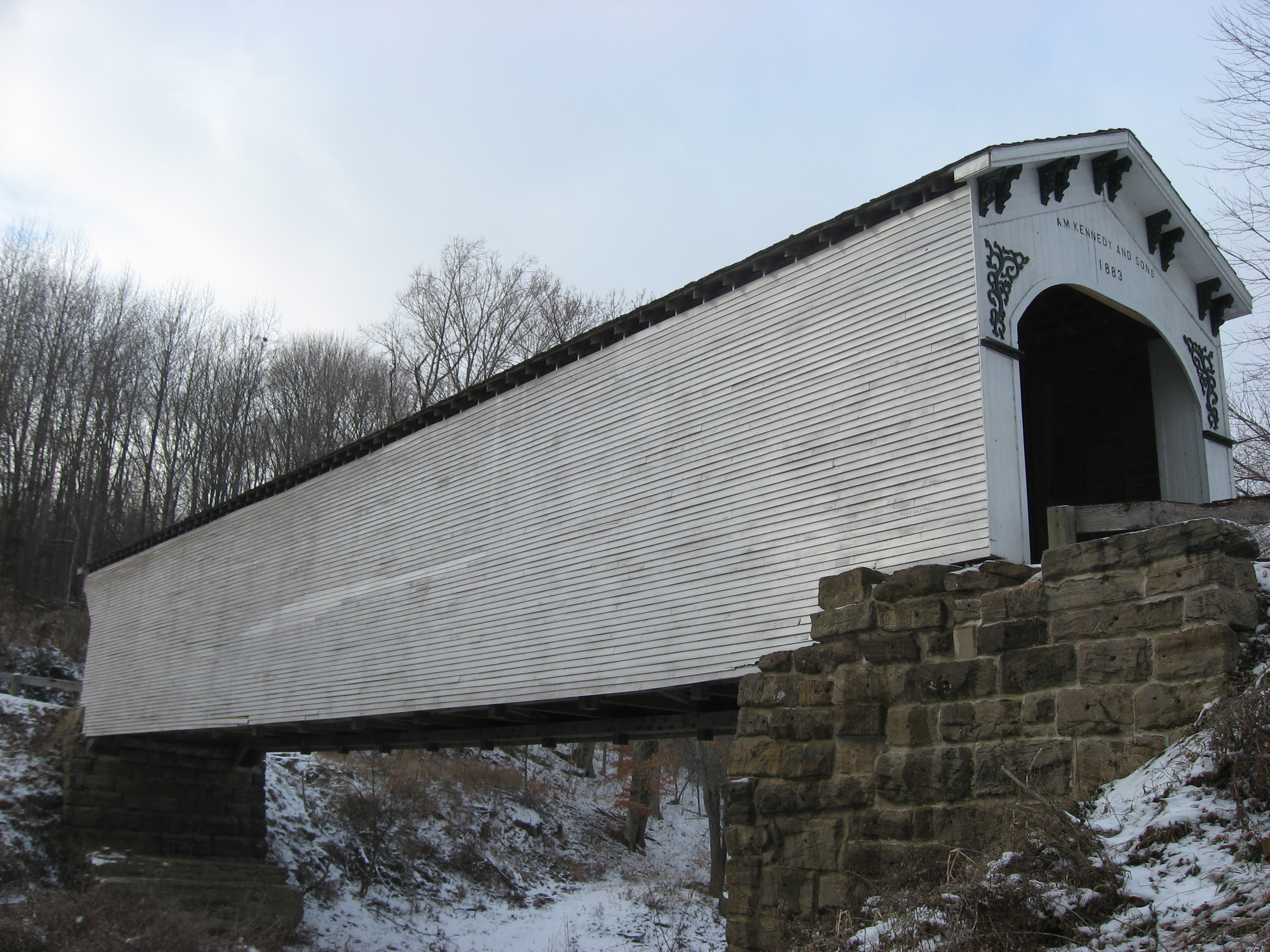
- Richland-Plummer Creek Covered Bridge, December 2010

- Location within Indiana Location within the United States
- Location: Baseline Rd. over Plummer Creek, south of Bloomfield, Taylor Township, Greene County, Indiana
- Coordinates: 38°59′34″N 86°56′16″W
- Area: less than one acre
- Built: 1883
- Built by: A.M. Kennedy & Sons; Freeman, Charles
- Architectural style: Italianate, Burr Arch Truss
- NRHP reference No.: 93000466
- Added to NRHP: June 10, 1993

Richland-Plummer Creek Covered Bridge, also known as County Bridge #86, is a historic covered bridge located in Taylor Township, Greene County, Indiana. It was built in 1883, and is a Burr Arch Truss structure measuring 102 feet long, 14 feet wide, and 16 feet tall. The single span bridge has walls clad in board and batten siding with Italianate style design elements.

It was listed on the National Register of Historic Places in 1993.
