= Fairplay Township, Greene County, Indiana =

Fairplay Township
- Township
- Location in Greene County
- Coordinates: 39°02′31″N 87°00′15″W
- Country: United States
- State: Indiana
- County: Greene

Government
  - Type: Indiana township

Area
  - Total: 26.19 sq mi (67.8 km^{2})
  - Land: 25.85 sq mi (67.0 km^{2})
  - Water: 0.33 sq mi (0.85 km^{2}) 1.26%
- Elevation: 499 ft (152 m)

Population (2020)
  - Total: 505
  - Density: 19.5/sq mi (7.54/km^{2})
- GNIS feature ID: 0453288

Fairplay Township is one of fifteen townships in Greene County, Indiana, United States. As of the 2020 census, its population was 505, down from 575 at 2010.

Historical population
Census	Pop.	Note	%±
1890	859		—
1900	1,041		21.2%
1910	983		−5.6%
1920	843		−14.2%
1930	759		−10.0%
1940	722		−4.9%
1950	659		−8.7%
1960	634		−3.8%
1970	651		2.7%
1980	645		−0.9%
1990	643		−0.3%
2000	666		3.6%
2010	575		−13.7%
2020	505		−12.2%
Source: US Decennial Census

== Geography ==
According to the 2010 census, the township has a total area of 26.19 square miles (67.8 km^{2}), of which 25.85 square miles (67.0 km^{2}) (or 98.70%) is land and 0.33 square miles (0.85 km^{2}) (or 1.26%) is water. The stream of Lattas Creek runs through this township.

=== Cities and towns ===
- Switz City (east quarter)

=== Unincorporated towns ===
- Elliston

(This list is based on USGS data and may include former settlements.)

=== Adjacent townships ===
- Jefferson Township (north)
- Highland Township (northeast)
- Richland Township (east)
- Taylor Township (southeast)
- Washington Township (southwest)
- Grant Township (west)
- Smith Township (northwest)

=== Cemeteries ===
The township contains one cemetery, Castle Hill.

=== Major highways ===
- US 231
- SR 54
- SR 57
- SR 67

=== Airports and landing strips ===
- Shawnee Field

== Notable natives ==
- Martin Wines, state representative
