= Scotland Hotel =

- U.S. National Register of Historic Places
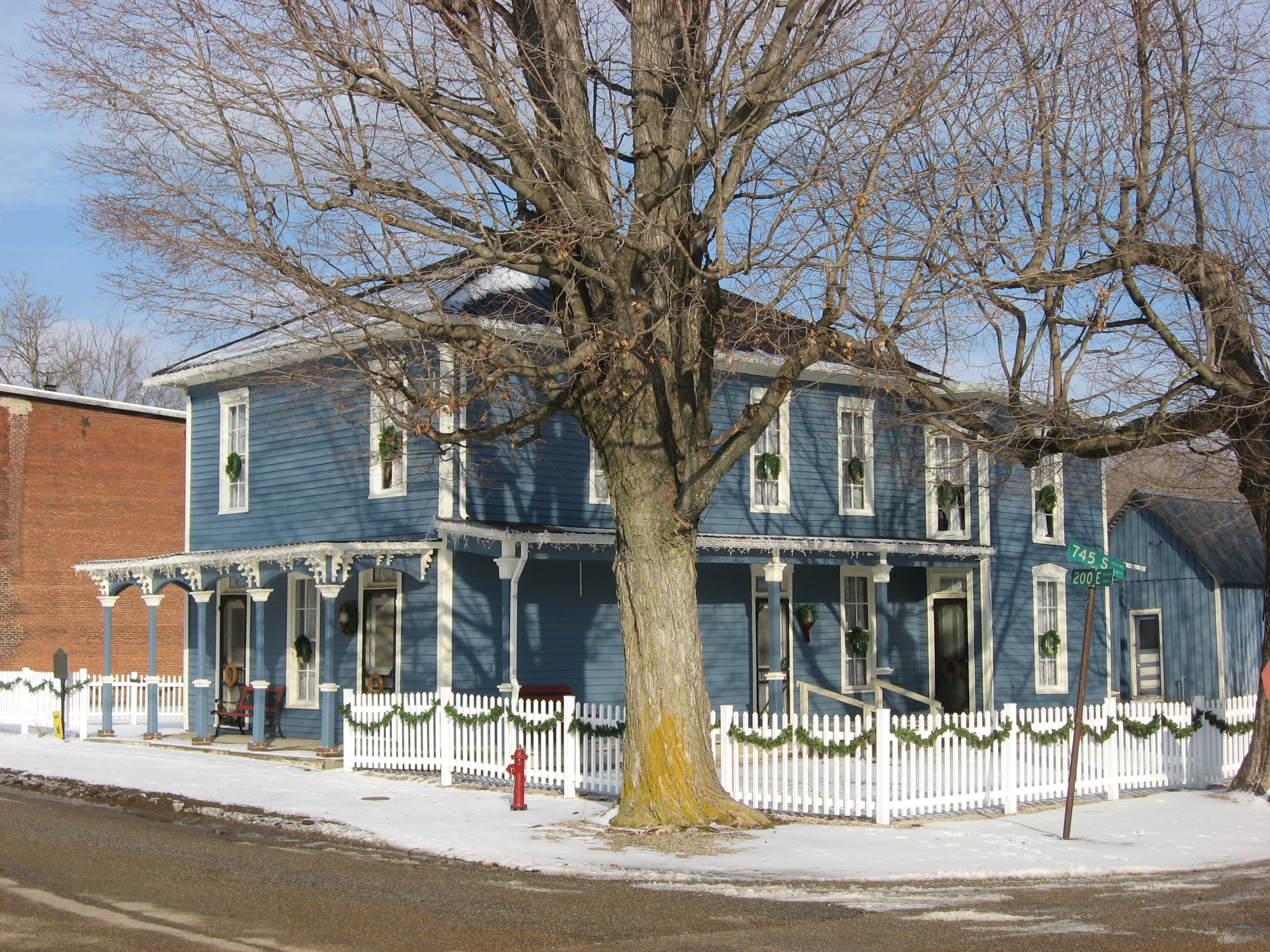
- Scotland Hotel, December 2010

- Location within Indiana Location within the United States
- Location: Jct. of Main and Jackson Sts., NE corner, Scotland, Indiana
- Coordinates: 38°54′47″N 86°54′14″W
- Area: less than one acre
- Built: 1879
- Architectural style: Italianate
- NRHP reference No.: 93000467
- Added to NRHP: May 27, 1993

Scotland Hotel is a historic hotel building located at Scotland, Indiana. It was built in 1879, and is a two-story, frame building with a rear section dated to the mid-1860s. It has a hipped roof and features a full-width, one-story front porch with Italianate style design elements.

It was listed on the National Register of Historic Places in 1993.
