= Greene County, Indiana =

County in Indiana, United States

- County
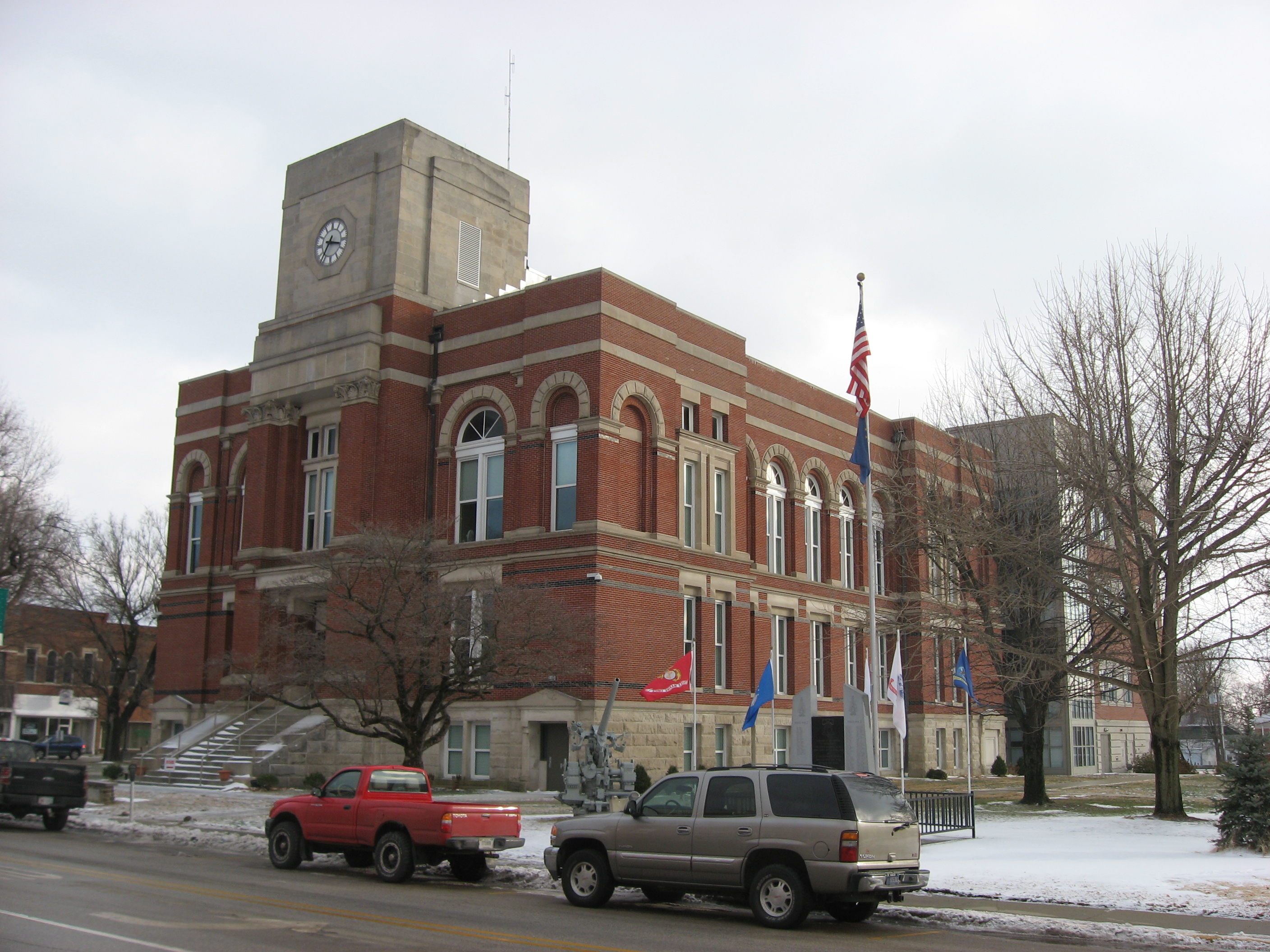
- Greene County Courthouse in Bloomfield

- Location within the U.S. state of Indiana
- Coordinates: 39°02′N 86°58′W
- Country: United States
- State: Indiana
- Founded: January 5, 1821
- Named for: Nathanael Greene
- Seat: Bloomfield
- Largest city: Linton

Area
  - Total: 545.92 sq mi (1,413.9 km^{2})
  - Land: 542.50 sq mi (1,405.1 km^{2})
  - Water: 3.42 sq mi (8.9 km^{2}) 0.63%

Population (2020)
  - Total: 30,803
  - Estimate (2025): 31,165 ▲
  - Density: 56.780/sq mi (21.923/km^{2})
- Time zone: UTC−5 (Eastern)
  - Summer (DST): UTC−4 (EDT)
- Congressional district: 8th
- Website: www.co.greene.in.us
- Indiana county number 28

Greene County is a county in the U.S. state of Indiana. As of 2020, the population was 30,803. The county seat is Bloomfield. The county was determined by the US Census Bureau to include the mean center of U.S. population in 1930.

== History ==
Greene County was formed in 1821, from unincorporated territory and from a portion of the previous Sullivan County. It was named for General Nathanael Greene, who commanded the southern theater in the American Revolutionary War, which eventually forced the British army under Charles Cornwallis to retreat to Yorktown. There it was forced to surrender, ensuring American independence.

Greene is home to the Tulip Viaduct. It was built in 1906 and is meant for freight trains. Today it is very popular with the locals and many visit it.

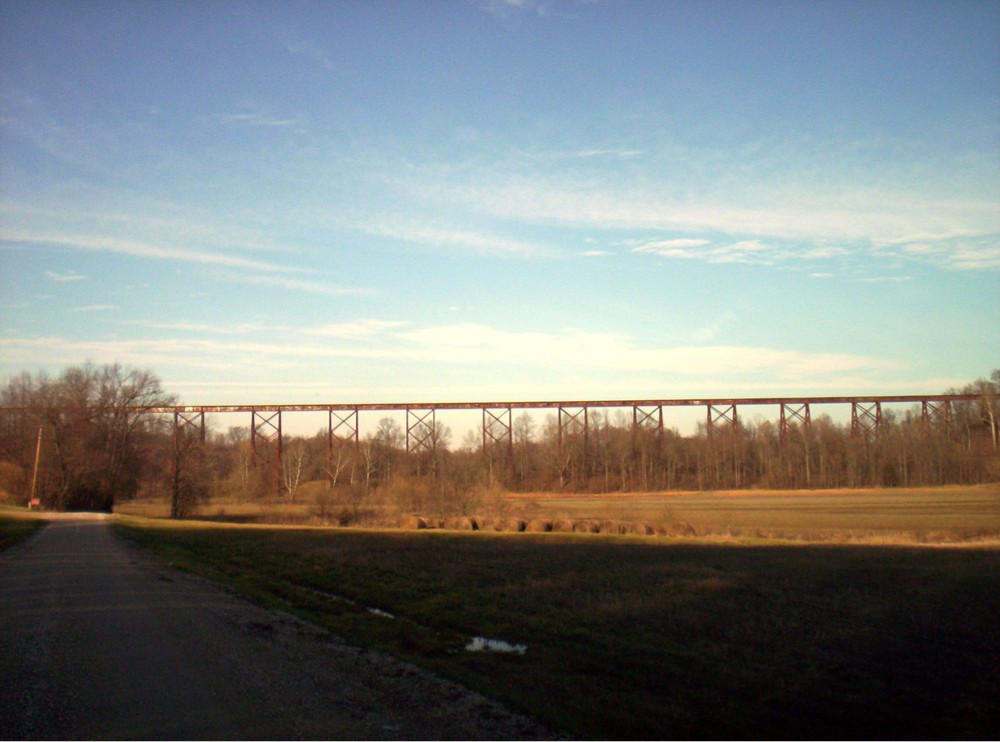
An image of the large viaduct

It is also home to the local goose pond. Which sees many visitors from across the state to view the wildlife.

== Climate and weather ==
Bloomfield, Indiana

Climate chart (precipitation, max. and min. temperature)
J	F	M	A	M	J	J	A	S	O	N	D
2.2 36 18	2.5 41 20	4.2 52 32	3.9 64 42	5 75 51	4.2 83 61	4.7 87 64	3.6 85 63	3.2 79 55	3.1 68 43	3.7 54 34	3.5 41 23
- █ Average max. and min. temperatures in °F
- █ Precipitation totals in inches
- Source: The Weather Channel
Metric conversion
J	F	M	A	M	J	J	A	S	O	N	D
56 2 −8	64 5 −7	107 11 0	99 18 6	127 24 11	107 28 16	119 31 18	91 29 17	81 26 13	79 20 6	94 12 1	89 5 −5
- █ Average max. and min. temperatures in °C
- █ Precipitation totals in mm

In recent years, average temperatures in Bloomfield have ranged from a low of 18 °F (−8 °C) in January to a high of 87 °F (31 °C) in July, although a record low of −21 °F (−29 °C) was recorded in January 1963 and a record high of 106 °F (41 °C) was recorded in June 1953. Average monthly precipitation ranged from 2.20 inches (56 mm) in January to 5.00 inches (127 mm) in May.

== Government ==
The county government is a constitutional body, and is granted specific powers by the Constitution of Indiana, and by the Indiana Code.

County Council: The county council is the legislative branch of the county government and controls all the spending and revenue collection in the county. Representatives are elected from county districts. The council members serve four-year terms. They are responsible for setting salaries, the annual budget, and special spending. The council also has limited authority to impose local taxes, in the form of an income and property tax that is subject to state level approval, excise taxes, and service taxes.

Board of Commissioners: The executive body of the county is made of a board of commissioners. The commissioners are elected county-wide, in four-year staggered terms. This board is charged with executing the acts legislated by the council, collecting revenue, and managing the day-to-day functions of the county government.

Court: The county maintains a small claims court that can handle some civil cases. The judge on the court is elected to a term of four years and must be a member of the Indiana Bar Association. The judge is assisted by a constable who is also elected to a four-year term. In some cases, court decisions can be appealed to the state level circuit court.

County Officials: The county has several other elected offices, including sheriff, coroner, auditor, treasurer, recorder, surveyor and circuit court clerk. Each serves a term of four years and oversees a different part of county government. Members elected to county government positions are required to declare party affiliations and to be residents of the county.

Greene County is part of Indiana's 8th congressional district; Indiana Senate districts 39 and 48; and Indiana House of Representatives districts 45, 60 and 62.

Greene County tends to vote Republican. Since 1888, county voters have chosen the Republican Party nominee in 73% (24 of 34) of the elections through 2020.

United States presidential election results for Greene County, Indiana
Year	Republican		Democratic		Third party(ies)	
Year	No.	%	No.	%	No.	%
1832	0	0.00%	471	72.35%	180	27.65%
1856	379	18.57%	1,129	55.32%	533	26.11%
1860	1,420	47.97%	1,316	44.46%	224	7.57%
1888	2,934	51.96%	2,659	47.09%	54	0.96%
1892	2,809	48.06%	2,488	42.57%	548	9.38%
1896	3,434	50.28%	3,344	48.96%	52	0.76%
1900	3,502	48.46%	3,491	48.31%	233	3.22%
1904	4,698	53.13%	3,559	40.25%	586	6.63%
1908	4,145	44.17%	4,172	44.45%	1,068	11.38%
1912	2,156	25.11%	3,373	39.28%	3,057	35.60%
1916	3,878	43.33%	3,990	44.59%	1,081	12.08%
1920	7,486	48.65%	6,335	41.17%	1,567	10.18%
1924	6,670	45.93%	5,966	41.09%	1,885	12.98%
1928	8,262	57.81%	5,761	40.31%	268	1.88%
1932	6,397	40.15%	8,845	55.51%	691	4.34%
1936	7,460	43.01%	9,730	56.10%	154	0.89%
1940	9,071	50.71%	8,718	48.73%	100	0.56%
1944	8,213	54.44%	6,744	44.70%	129	0.86%
1948	7,453	48.20%	7,709	49.85%	301	1.95%
1952	8,620	53.25%	7,417	45.82%	152	0.94%
1956	8,722	54.62%	7,186	45.00%	61	0.38%
1960	8,810	57.81%	6,325	41.51%	104	0.68%
1964	5,919	40.62%	8,574	58.85%	77	0.53%
1968	6,525	48.37%	5,493	40.72%	1,473	10.92%
1972	8,453	64.80%	4,450	34.11%	142	1.09%
1976	6,442	46.54%	7,263	52.47%	138	1.00%
1980	7,452	52.86%	6,027	42.75%	619	4.39%
1984	8,438	60.71%	5,267	37.90%	193	1.39%
1988	7,689	55.94%	5,979	43.50%	78	0.57%
1992	5,410	39.76%	5,431	39.91%	2,767	20.33%
1996	5,746	44.67%	5,277	41.03%	1,839	14.30%
2000	7,452	59.05%	4,898	38.81%	269	2.13%
2004	8,609	64.48%	4,606	34.50%	137	1.03%
2008	7,691	56.34%	5,709	41.82%	250	1.83%
2012	8,457	64.36%	4,350	33.10%	334	2.54%
2016	10,277	74.14%	2,929	21.13%	655	4.73%
2020	11,103	74.98%	3,389	22.89%	315	2.13%
2024	11,132	75.97%	3,270	22.32%	251	1.71%

== Communities ==
=== Cities ===
- Jasonville
- Linton

=== Towns ===
- Bloomfield
- Lyons
- Newberry
- Switz City
- Worthington

=== Census-designated places ===
- Owensburg
- Scotland

=== Other unincorporated places ===
- Beehunter
- Calvertville
- Cincinnati
- Doans
- Dresden
- Elliston
- Furnace
- Gilmour (partial)
- Hashtown
- Hendricksville
- Hobbieville (called Jonesville 1837–1840)
- Hoosier
- Island City
- Johnstown
- Koleen
- Lone Tree
- Marco
- McVille
- Midland
- Midland Junction
- Mineral City (also called Mineral)
- Newark
- Park
- Plummer
- Point Commerce
- Redcuff Corner
- Ridgeport
- Rincon
- Solsberry
- Summit
- Tulip
- Vicksburg
- Victoria
- White Rose

=== Townships ===
- Beech Creek
- Cass
- Center
- Fairplay
- Grant
- Highland
- Jackson
- Jefferson
- Richland
- Smith
- Stafford
- Stockton
- Taylor
- Washington
- Wright

=== Major highways ===
- I-69
- US 231
- SR 43
- SR 45
- SR 48
- SR 54
- SR 57
- SR 58
- SR 59
- SR 67
- SR 157
- SR 445

== Education ==
Greene County has five separate school districts.

- Bloomfield School District, which operates Bloomfield Junior-Senior High School
- Eastern Greene County School District, which operates Eastern Greene High School
- Linton-Stockton School Corporation, which operates Linton-Stockton High School
- Shakamak Schools Metropolitan School District, which operates Shakamak Junior-Senior High School
- White River Valley School District, which operates White River Valley High School

== Geography ==
According to the 2010 census, the county has a total area of 545.92 square miles (1,413.9 km^{2}), of which 542.50 square miles (1,405.1 km^{2}) (or 99.37%) is land and 3.42 square miles (8.9 km^{2}) (or 0.63%) is water.

== Economy ==
The Greene County Economic Development Corporation (GCEDC) currently serves to develop new businesses and support current businesses in Greene County, Indiana. This asset was established to assist in bringing projects to the county. Coupled with The Indiana Economic Development Corporation, Greene County has developed an incentive portfolio to assist potential new employers.

The county has been designated a Labor Surplus Area and an SBA HUB Zone (Historically Underused Business Zone), which provides advantages to county businesses in government contract bidding and eligibility for federal and state assistance. Employee location and screening services are offered by WorkOne Linton, the local branch of the Indiana State Workforce Development office. Worker training programs are available onsite and at the Greene County Community Learning Center, which serves as a local access site for area colleges and universities.

== Demographics ==
Historical population
Census	Pop.	Note	%±
1830	4,242		—
1840	8,321		96.2%
1850	12,313		48.0%
1860	16,041		30.3%
1870	19,514		21.7%
1880	22,996		17.8%
1890	24,379		6.0%
1900	28,530		17.0%
1910	36,873		29.2%
1920	36,770		−0.3%
1930	31,481		−14.4%
1940	31,330		−0.5%
1950	27,886		−11.0%
1960	26,327		−5.6%
1970	26,894		2.2%
1980	30,416		13.1%
1990	30,410		0.0%
2000	33,157		9.0%
2010	33,165		0.0%
2020	30,803		−7.1%
2025 (est.)	31,165	▲	1.2%
US Decennial Census; 1790–1960 1900–1990; 1990–2000 2010

=== Racial and ethnic composition ===
Greene County, Indiana – Racial and ethnic composition Note: the US Census treats Hispanic/Latino as an ethnic category. This table excludes Latinos from the racial categories and assigns them to a separate category. Hispanics/Latinos may be of any race.
Race / Ethnicity (NH = Non-Hispanic)	Pop 1980	Pop 1990	Pop 2000	Pop 2010	Pop 2020	% 1980	% 1990	% 2000	% 2010	% 2020
White alone (NH)	30,213	30,147	32,515	32,343	29,035	99.33%	99.14%	98.06%	97.52%	94.26%
Black or African American alone (NH)	10	10	25	49	53	0.03%	0.03%	0.08%	0.15%	0.17%
Native American or Alaska Native alone (NH)	21	47	99	82	68	0.07%	0.15%	0.30%	0.25%	0.22%
Asian alone (NH)	69	57	64	96	104	0.23%	0.19%	0.19%	0.29%	0.34%
Native Hawaiian or Pacific Islander alone (NH)	x	x	4	4	4	x	x	0.01%	0.01%	0.01%
Other race alone (NH)	6	3	5	19	51	0.02%	0.01%	0.02%	0.06%	0.17%
Mixed race or Multiracial (NH)	x	x	177	250	937	x	x	0.53%	0.75%	3.04%
Hispanic or Latino (any race)	97	146	268	322	551	0.32%	0.48%	0.81%	0.97%	1.79%
Total	30,416	30,410	33,157	33,165	30,803	100.00%	100.00%	100.00%	100.00%	100.00%

=== 2020 census ===
As of the 2020 census, the county had a population of 30,803. The median age was 43.7 years. 22.1% of residents were under the age of 18 and 20.3% of residents were 65 years of age or older. For every 100 females there were 99.4 males, and for every 100 females age 18 and over there were 98.2 males age 18 and over.

The racial makeup of the county was 94.9% White, 0.2% Black or African American, 0.3% American Indian and Alaska Native, 0.4% Asian, <0.1% Native Hawaiian and Pacific Islander, 0.6% from some other race, and 3.7% from two or more races. Hispanic or Latino residents of any race comprised 1.8% of the population.

17.2% of residents lived in urban areas, while 82.8% lived in rural areas.

There were 12,754 households in the county, of which 28.0% had children under the age of 18 living in them. Of all households, 50.7% were married-couple households, 18.8% were households with a male householder and no spouse or partner present, and 23.6% were households with a female householder and no spouse or partner present. About 28.4% of all households were made up of individuals and 13.7% had someone living alone who was 65 years of age or older.

There were 14,329 housing units, of which 11.0% were vacant. Among occupied housing units, 78.1% were owner-occupied and 21.9% were renter-occupied. The homeowner vacancy rate was 1.7% and the rental vacancy rate was 11.4%.

=== 2010 census ===
As of the 2010 United States census, there were 33,165 people, 13,487 households, and 9,276 families in the county. The population density was 61.1 inhabitants per square mile (23.6/km^{2}). There were 15,211 housing units at an average density of 28.0 per square mile (10.8/km^{2}). The racial makeup of the county was 98.1% white, 0.3% Asian, 0.3% American Indian, 0.1% black or African American, 0.3% from other races, and 0.9% from two or more races. Those of Hispanic or Latino origin made up 1.0% of the population. In terms of ancestry, 25.5% were German, 16.8% were Irish, 12.9% were American, and 11.2% were English.

Of the 13,487 households, 31.8% had children under the age of 18 living with them, 54.3% were married couples living together, 9.4% had a female householder with no husband present, 31.2% were non-families, and 27.0% of all households were made up of individuals. The average household size was 2.44 and the average family size was 2.92. The median age was 41.1 years.

The median income for a household in the county was $47,697 and the median income for a family was $50,740. Males had a median income of $41,524 versus $31,890 for females. The per capita income for the county was $20,676. About 10.0% of families and 14.4% of the population were below the poverty line, including 19.7% of those under age 18 and 8.9% of those age 65 or over.

== See also ==
- Maryland Ridge Community (Indiana)
- National Register of Historic Places listings in Greene County, Indiana
