= Stafford Township, Greene County, Indiana =

Stafford Township
- Township
- Location in Greene County
- Coordinates: 38°56′55″N 87°10′37″W
- Country: United States
- State: Indiana
- County: Greene

Government
  - Type: Indiana township

Area
  - Total: 35.97 sq mi (93.2 km^{2})
  - Land: 35.82 sq mi (92.8 km^{2})
  - Water: 0.16 sq mi (0.41 km^{2}) 0.44%
- Elevation: 505 ft (154 m)

Population (2020)
  - Total: 411
  - Density: 11.5/sq mi (4.43/km^{2})
- GNIS feature ID: 0453869

Stafford Township is one of fifteen townships in Greene County, Indiana, USA. As of the 2020 census, its population was 411, down from 448 at 2010.

Historical population
Census	Pop.	Note	%±
1890	1,304		—
1900	1,529		17.3%
1910	1,322		−13.5%
1920	1,297		−1.9%
1930	1,145		−11.7%
1940	1,065		−7.0%
1950	853		−19.9%
1960	730		−14.4%
1970	535		−26.7%
1980	590		10.3%
1990	493		−16.4%
2000	490		−0.6%
2010	448		−8.6%
2020	411		−8.3%
Source: US Decennial Census

== Geography ==
According to the 2010 census, the township has a total area of 35.97 square miles (93.2 km^{2}), of which 35.82 square miles (92.8 km^{2}) (or 99.58%) is land and 0.16 square miles (0.41 km^{2}) (or 0.44%) is water.

=== Unincorporated towns ===
- Marco

(This list is based on USGS data and may include former settlements.)

=== Adjacent townships ===
- Stockton Township (north)
- Grant Township (northeast)
- Washington Township (east)
- Vigo Township, Knox County (south)
- Jefferson Township, Sullivan County (west)

=== Major highways ===
- SR 59
- SR 67
- SR 159
