= Wright Township, Greene County, Indiana =

Wright Township, Indiana
- Township
- Location in Greene County
- Coordinates: 39°07′31″N 87°11′11″W
- Country: United States
- State: Indiana
- County: Greene
- Named for: Rev. Richard Wright

Government
  - Type: Indiana township

Area
  - Total: 36.18 sq mi (93.7 km^{2})
  - Land: 35.68 sq mi (92.4 km^{2})
  - Water: 0.5 sq mi (1.3 km^{2}) 1.38%
- Elevation: 633 ft (193 m)

Population (2020)
  - Total: 3,550
  - Density: 99.5/sq mi (38.4/km^{2})
- GNIS feature ID: 0454065

Wright Township is one of fifteen townships in Greene County, Indiana, United States. As of the 2020 census, its population was 3,550, down from 3,921 at 2010.

Historical population
Census	Pop.	Note	%±
1890	1,500		—
1900	1,596		6.4%
1910	5,980		274.7%
1920	7,949		32.9%
1930	6,238		−21.5%
1940	5,843		−6.3%
1950	4,711		−19.4%
1960	4,001		−15.1%
1970	3,821		−4.5%
1980	4,220		10.4%
1990	3,950		−6.4%
2000	4,224		6.9%
2010	3,921		−7.2%
2020	3,550		−9.5%
Source: US Decennial Census

== History ==
Wright Township was named after Reverend Richard Wright, a pioneer preacher.

The Shakamak State Park Historic District was listed on the National Register of Historic Places in 2000.

== Geography ==
According to the 2010 census, the township has a total area of 36.18 square miles (93.7 km^{2}), of which 35.68 square miles (92.4 km^{2}) (or 98.62%) is land and 0.5 square miles (1.3 km^{2}) (or 1.38%) is water.

=== Cities and towns ===
- Jasonville

=== Unincorporated towns ===
- Gilmour
- Midland
- Midland Junction
- Redcuff Corner
- Vicksburg

(This list is based on USGS data and may include former settlements.)

=== Adjacent townships ===
- Lewis Township, Clay County (north)
- Smith Township (east)
- Grant Township (southeast)
- Stockton Township (south)
- Cass Township, Sullivan County (west)
- Jackson Township, Sullivan County (northwest)

=== Cemeteries ===
The township contains three cemeteries: Bethel, Frye and Terhune.

=== Major highways ===
- SR 48
- SR 59

=== Airports and landing strips ===
- Shakamak Airport
