= Ronald Reagan Parkway (Indiana) =

Roadway near Indianapolis, Indiana

Ronald Reagan Parkway Ameriplex Parkway
- Former name: Ronald Reagan Boulevard
- Length: 16.5 mi (26.6 km)
- Location: Marion and Hendricks counties, Indiana, United States
- South end: SR 67
- Major junctions: I-70; US 40; US 36; US 136; I-74
- North end: CR 750N

Construction
- Commissioned: 1990s
- Completed: Early 2000s (to US 40); 2012 (US 40 to US 36); 2015 (extension to CR 300); 2017 (extension to I-74); 2025 (extension to CR 750)

Ronald Reagan Parkway and Ameriplex Parkway is a parkway-type road named in part after former U.S. President Ronald Reagan. The road was commissioned in the 1990s, and the initial one-mile (1.6 km) section from U.S. Highway 36 to County Road 100 N (CR 100 N) was completed in 1996. It was later extended to CR 200 N. The segment from CR 200 N to CR 300 N opened in early 2015. Construction on the section from CR 300 N to the existing road connecting to US 136 began in 2015 and was completed in late 2017. Another extension via State Road 267 (SR267) to I-65 was planned to be opened by 2020, but has been delayed. A new plan has construction starting on the Hendricks County portion of the northern extension in middle 2023, with phase 1A opened in November 2025 that extended the road up to CR 750N. Phase 1B will extend the road further north up to CR 1000N (just south of the Hendricks-Boone county line), and it will begin construction in winter 2025–26.

== Route description ==
The roadway starts at State Road 67 at a traffic light, and is the southern terminus of Ameriplex Parkway. It heads northwest, meeting three traffic lights. It then comes to exit 68 on Interstate 70 and has a connection to the Indianapolis International Airport. At this interchange, Ameriplex Parkway ends and Ronald Reagan Parkway begins. The parkway then heads north to its northern terminus. It comes to a traffic light at Stafford Road, which connects to SR 267. It goes through one more traffic light at Metropolis Parkway, and a two-way stop intersection with Airtech Parkway. It then comes to its former northern terminus at a traffic light with US 40. From there it goes north through two more traffic lights at CR 200 S (Bradford Road), and CR 100 S (Morris Street). It then goes through traffic lights at US 36, CR 100 N (10th Street), and CR 200 N (21st Street), and then has a traffic light at CR 300 N. Then it continues north, crossing CR 400N and going over a railroad and US 136, before it comes to a stoplight at Connector Road, which connects to US 136. Continuing north, the road crosses Interstate 74 as exit 68 and then continues north to 600N (56th Street) at a traffic light. Then it continues north, going over a railroad and goes through a traffic light at CR 700 N, before ending at another traffic light at CR 750 N.

== Major intersections ==
County	Location	mi	km	Destinations	Notes
Marion	Indianapolis	0.00	0.00	SR 67	Southern end of Ameriplex Parkway
Hendricks	Plainfield	3.15	5.07	I-70 (Indianapolis International Airport) / I-465 / I-74	I-70 exit 68; frontage roads run to I-465; Access to parkway (westbound only) from I-465 is only Exit 9B, and complete I-465 access eastbound; northern end of Ameriplex Pkwy and southern end of Ronald Reagan Parkway
Hendricks	Plainfield			US 40	
Hendricks	Avon			US 36	
Hendricks	Brownsburg			Connector Road	To US 136
Hendricks	Brownsburg			I-74 – Indianapolis, Crawfordsville	
Hendricks	Brownsburg			CR 750 North	Northern end of Ronald Reagan Parkway
1.000 mi = 1.609 km; 1.000 km = 0.621 mi: Route transition
