= Indiana State Road 103 =

State highway in Indiana, United States

State Road 103
- SR 103 highlighted in red

Route information
- Maintained by INDOT
- Length: 14.089 mi (22.674 km)

Major junctions
- South end: US 40 at Lewisville
- North end: US 36 in Prairie Township

Location
- Country: United States
- State: Indiana
- Counties: Henry

Highway system
- Indiana State Highway System; Interstate; US; State; Scenic
← SR 101	→ SR 104

State Road 103 in the U.S. state of Indiana is a 14-mile (23 km) north–south route in Henry County.

== Route description ==
State Road 103 nearly parallels its parent route, State Road 3, between U.S. Route 36 east of Mount Summit and U.S. Route 40 in Lewisville. It runs through downtown New Castle and past the Wilbur Wright Fish and Wildlife Area. It also crosses Interstate 70, but there is no interchange.

== History ==
SR 103 from US 40 to SR 38 was SR 3, before a new four-lane highway was built and SR 3 was rerouted onto the new four-lane highway.

== Major intersections ==
The entire route is in Henry County.

Location	mi	km	Destinations	Notes
Lewisville	0.000	0.000	US 40	Southern terminus of SR 103
New Castle	8.660	13.937	SR 38 east	Eastern end of SR 38 concurrency
New Castle	8.776	14.124	SR 38 west	Western end of SR 38 concurrency
Prairie Township	14.089	22.674	US 36	Northern terminus of SR 103
1.000 mi = 1.609 km; 1.000 km = 0.621 mi: Concurrency terminus
