= U.S. Route 36 in Indiana =

Section of US Numbered Highway in Indiana

U.S. Route 36
- US 36 highlighted in red

Route information
- Maintained by INDOT
- Existed: October 1, 1926–present

Major junctions
- West end: US 36 west of Dana
- US 41 in Rockville; I-74 / I-465 in Indianapolis; I-70 in Indianapolis; I-69 in Indianapolis; I-65 in Indianapolis; I-74 in Indianapolis; I-70 in Indianapolis; I-69 / I-465 in Indianapolis–Lawrence line; US 35 in Losantville; US 27 in Lynn
- East end: US 36 east of Spartanburg

Location
- Country: United States
- State: Indiana
- Counties: Vermillion, Parke, Putnam, Hendricks, Marion, Hancock, Madison, Henry, Randolph

Highway system
- United States Numbered Highway System; List; Special; Divided; Indiana State Highway System; Interstate; US; State; Scenic
← US 35	→ SR 37

U.S. Route 36 (US 36) is a part of the United States Numbered Highway System that runs from Rocky Mountain National Park, Colorado to Uhrichsville, Ohio. In the state of Indiana, it is part of the Indiana State Road system that runs across the central portion of the state from the Illinois state line near Dana to the Ohio state line near Spartanburg. In the Indianapolis area, US 36 overlaps the southern section of Interstate 465 (I-465), bypassing the downtown area where the route formerly went.

== Route description ==
=== Illinois state line to Indianapolis ===
Entering into Indiana, US 36 continues eastward in a straight line, serving Dana via SR 71. Just west of Highland and Hillsdale, the route meets SR 63 at a parclo interchange. The route then crosses over the Wabash River and enters Montezuma. After meandering eastward, the route intersects with US 41 in Rockville before entering the town's downtown area. Further east, the route serves the following routes and towns: SR 59 in Bellmore, Hollandsburg west of a lake, Morton, US 231, Bainbridge, SR 75 in New Winchester, SR 39 in Danville, Gale, and SR 267 in Avon. Entering through the city limit of Indianapolis, US 36 meets I-465/I-74 at another parclo interchange. US 36 is directed to travel along the southern loop of I-465. Rockville Road continues east toward downtown Indianapolis.

=== Indianapolis to Lawrence ===
Along the southern loop portion of I-465, the road contains numerous signed (Interstate highways) and unsigned (US and state highways) concurrencies. Shortly after US 36 gets onto I-465, US 40 joins the concurrency southward. The next two exits (Sam Jones Expressway and I-70) serve the Indianapolis International Airport. The interchange with I-70 is a combination interchange. After leaving the vicinity of the airport, the beltway begins to curve eastward. At the next exit after I-70, SR 67 joins the concurrency. South of the Harding Street Generating Station and a quarry, the beltway meets an interchange with I-69, which joins the beltway heading eastbound. At the next interchange, US 31 enters the beltway eastward as well. The beltway then meets I-65 at another combination interchange. After curving north, the I-74 splits off eastward, while US 421 joins northward. US 52 then enters the beltway northward; at this point until the next exit, this section has the highest amount of routes (8 routes). At the next exit, US 40 branches off eastward. The beltway then meets I-70 at yet another combination interchange. US 36, along with SR 67, eventually diverges northeastward at the city limit of Lawrence.

=== Lawrence to Ohio state line ===
Both US 36 and SR 67 travel along Pendleton Pike on their way to Pendleton. Between Lawrence and Pendleton, the routes intersect SR 234 in McCordsville, enter the communities of Woodbury, Fortville, and Ingalls. In Pendleton, SR 9 travels northward with the concurrency. Shortly after intersecting with SR 38, US 36 turns east, while SR 38 continues north toward I-69. For the remainder of the route in Indiana, US 36 comes across the following: SR 109 in Emporia, Mechanicsburg, Sulphur Springs, SR 3 east of Mount Summit, SR 103, Mooreland, US 35 in Losantsville, SR 1 in Modoc, US 27 in Lynn, and SR 277. 1 mile (1.6 km) after SR 277, US 36 enters the state of Ohio.

== History ==
Initially, the US 36 alignment between Montezuma and Indianapolis was signed as State Road 31. In 1926, US 36 was formed to replace SR 31 as a whole. The state route number also conflicted with another U.S. route with the same number, which necessitated the removal of SR 31.

After US 36 was formed, the route in Indiana only traveled from the Illinois state line to US 40 (Washington Street) in Indianapolis. In 1931, US 36 was extended from Indianapolis to the state line at Union City (destined toward Cadiz) via SR 67 (Indianapolis to Muncie) and SR 28 (Muncie to Ohio state line). The state routes were retained however. The next year, SR 28 was relocated northward, while SR 32 took the place of SR 28's former alignment. Later that year, US 36 was rerouted southward from Pendleton to Greenville along, in large part, its current routing.

Up until 1975, US 36 traveled along the following roads in Indianapolis: Rockville Road, Washington Street, West Street, Northwestern Avenue, 38th Street, and Pendleton Pike. From 1975 onwards, US 36 was rerouted along the southern edge of I-465.

== Major intersections ==
County	Location	mi	km	Exit	Destinations	Notes
Vermillion		0.00	0.00		US 36 west	Continuation into Illinois
Vermillion		2.048	3.296		SR 71 – St. Bernice, Dana	
Vermillion		6.834	10.998		SR 63 – Evansville, Terre Haute, Chicago	
Parke	Rockville				US 41 – Terre Haute, Attica	
Parke	Bellmore				SR 59 – Brazil, Mansfield, Waveland	
Putnam					US 231 – Greencastle, Crawfordsville	
Hendricks	New Winchester				SR 75 – Coatesville, North Salem	
Hendricks	Danville				SR 39 north (Urban Street)	Western end of SR 39 concurrency
Hendricks	Danville				SR 39 south (Cross Street) – Clayton, Belleville	Eastern end of SR 39 concurrency
Hendricks	Avon				SR 267 (Avon Avenue) – Plainfield, Brownsburg	
Marion	Indianapolis				I-74 west / I-465 north Rockville Road	Western end of I-74/I-465 concurrency
Marion	Indianapolis			12	US 40 west (Washington Street) – Terre Haute, Plainfield	Western end of US 40 concurrency
Marion	Indianapolis			11	Sam Jones Expressway	
Marion	Indianapolis			9	I-70 – Indianapolis, Terre Haute, Indianapolis International Airport, Plainfield, St. Louis	Signed as exits 9A (east) and 9B (west); exit 73 on I-70 westbound, exit 69 on I-70 eastbound
Marion	Indianapolis			8	SR 67 south (Kentucky Avenue) – Vincennes	Western end of SR 67 concurrency
Marion	Indianapolis			7	Mann Road	Westbound exit and eastbound entrance
Marion	Indianapolis			5	I-69 south – Evansville	Interchange opened on August 6 and 9, 2024; western end of I-69 concurrency; I-69 exit 163
Marion	Indianapolis			4	Harding Street	
Marion	Indianapolis			2	US 31 south (East Street) – Greenwood	Western end of US 31 concurrency; signed as exits 2A (north) and 2B (south)
Marion	Indianapolis			53	I-65 – Indianapolis, Louisville	
Marion	Beech Grove			52	Emerson Avenue	
Marion	Indianapolis			49	I-74 east / US 421 south / Southeastern Avenue – Cincinnati	Eastern end of I-74 and western end of US 421 concurrencies
Marion	Indianapolis			48	Shadeland Avenue	Northbound exit and southbound entrance; former SR 100
Marion	Indianapolis			47	US 52 east (Brookville Road) – Rushville, Brookville	Western end of US 52 concurrency
Marion	Indianapolis			46	US 40 east (Washington Street) – Greenfield, Richmond	Eastern end of US 40 concurrency
Marion	Indianapolis			44	I-70 – Indianapolis, Dayton	I-70 eastbound exit 89, westbound exit 90; signed northbound as exits 44A (east) & 44B (west)
Marion	Lawrence				I-465 north / I-69 north / US 31 north / US 52 north / US 421 north – Fort Wayne; Pendleton Pike	Eastern end of I-465/I-69/US 31/US 52/US 421 concurrency
Hancock	McCordsville				SR 234 east – New Castle	Western terminus of SR 234
Hancock	Fortville				SR 13 north	Southern terminus of SR 13
Madison	Pendleton				SR 9 south – Greenfield	Western end of SR 9 concurrency
Madison	Pendleton				SR 38 – New Castle	Western end of SR 38 concurrency
Madison	Pendleton				SR 9 north / SR 38 west / SR 67 north – Anderson	Eastern end of SR 9/SR 38/SR 67 concurrency
Madison	Emporia				SR 109	
Henry	Mount Summit				SR 3 – New Castle, Muncie	Interchange
Henry					SR 103 south	
Randolph	Losantville				US 35	
Randolph					SR 1 south	Western end of SR 1 concurrency
Randolph	Modoc				SR 1 north (Main Street)	Eastern end of SR 1 concurrency
Randolph	Lynn				US 27 – Lynn, Winchester	
Randolph					SR 227	
Randolph					US 36 east	Continuation into Ohio
1.000 mi = 1.609 km; 1.000 km = 0.621 mi: Concurrency terminus; Incomplete access

U.S. Route 36
Previous state: Illinois	Indiana	Next state: Ohio
