= Indiana State Road 67 =

Highway in Indiana

State Road 67
- SR 67 highlighted in red

Route information
- Maintained by INDOT
- Length: 199.24 mi (320.65 km)
- Existed: October 1, 1926–present

Major junctions
- South end: US 41 / US 150 near Vincennes
- US 231 near Worthington; I-74 / I-465 in Indianapolis; I-69 in Indianapolis; I-65 in Indianapolis; I-74 in Indianapolis; I-70 in Indianapolis; I-69 / I-465 in Indianapolis; US 36 in Pendleton; US 35 in Muncie; US 27 in Portland
- North end: SR 29 near Celina, OH

Location
- Country: United States
- State: Indiana
- Counties: Knox, Greene, Owen, Morgan, Hendricks, Marion, Hancock, Madison, Delaware, Jay

Highway system
- Indiana State Highway System; Interstate; US; State; Scenic
← SR 66	→ SR 68

State Road 67 in the U.S. state of Indiana cuts a diagonal route from southwest to northeast across the state from the north side of Vincennes to Indianapolis to the Ohio state line, where it becomes State Route 29 east of Bryant.

== Route description ==
State Road 67 is a two-lane highway, with intermittent stretches of four-lane undivided highway, from Vincennes to near Martinsville, where it becomes a four-lane limited-access highway. SR 67 overlaps U.S. Highway 231 from three miles (5 km) southwest of Worthington, Indiana, to six miles (10 km) north of Spencer, a distance of approximately 30 miles (48 km).

Once SR 67 reaches Indianapolis, as Kentucky Avenue, it overlaps Interstate 465 around the south and east sides of the city until Exit 42, where SR 67 and U.S. Highway 36 depart the city to the northeast as Pendleton Pike. U.S. Highway 36 splits off from State Road 67 in Pendleton and proceeds east.

SR 67 joins Interstate 69 from Anderson to Daleville, where it leaves the interstate and becomes an expressway bypass that serves the south and east sides of Muncie.

Northeast of Muncie, SR 67 wraps up its diagonal run in the same manner as it began: as a rural, two-lane highway. Portions of the route overlap others.

== History ==
SR 67 was so numbered and aligned because it was planned as a potential northeastern extension of U.S. Route 67. US 67 was later extended northward away from Indiana.

=== Indianapolis ===
SR 67 was routed through downtown before the opening of I-465. SR 67 overlapped US 36 for most of the way. The route consisted of Pendleton Pike, then turned right onto 38th Street. The routes then overlapped U.S. 421 when they turned left onto Dr. Martin Luther King Jr. Street. After I-65, the road becomes West Street with U.S. 52 briefly overlapping US 36/US 421/SR 67. At Washington Street (westbound) and Maryland Street (eastbound) (both U.S. 40), US 36/52/421 separated from SR 67. US 36 went onto Washington Street (it enters West Street after turning left from Maryland Street). US 52/421 turned left onto Maryland Street (they enter West Street after turning right from Washington Street). After the US 40 intersections, SR 67 was left alone on West Street. For a few feet, the road split into two one-way roads: Missouri Street northbound, and West Street southbound. It then turned right onto Kentucky Avenue (from Kentucky Avenue, SR 67 went on South Street, then turned left onto Missouri Street). It traveled onto Kentucky Avenue for about one mile, then onto Morris and Harding Streets for another mile. From there, SR 67 went onto Kentucky Avenue for the rest of the way.

== Major intersections ==
County	Location	mi	km	Exit	Destinations	Notes
Knox	Vincennes	0.00	0.00		US 41 / US 150	Southern terminus of SR 67
Knox	Bruceville	5.06	8.14		SR 550	
Knox	Bicknell	11.05	17.78		SR 159 north – Freelandville	Southern terminus of SR 159
Knox	Vigo Township	14.20	22.85		SR 358 east	Western terminus of SR 358
Knox	Vigo Township	19.09	30.72		SR 58 west – Freelandville	Western end of SR 58 concurrency
Knox	Vigo Township	20.39	32.81		SR 58 east – Elnora	Eastern end of SR 58 concurrency
Knox	Sandborn	22.48	36.18		SR 59 – Linton	
Greene	Switz City	34.62	55.72		SR 54 – Linton, Bloomfield	
Greene	Fairplay Township	38.58	62.09		US 231 south / SR 57 south – Bloomfield, Elnora	Southern end of US 231 concurrency; northern terminus of SR 57
Greene	Worthington				SR 157 – Bloomfield, Clay City	
Owen	Spencer				SR 46 – Terre Haute	
Owen	Montgomery Township	65.40	105.25		US 231 north – Cloverdale	Eastern end of US 231 concurrency
Morgan	Jefferson Township	82.48	132.74		SR 39 south to I-69 – Martinsville	Southern end of SR 39 concurrency
Morgan	Jefferson Township	85.82	138.11		SR 39 north – Danville	Northern end of SR 39 concurrency
Morgan	Mooresville	95.86	154.27		SR 42 west / SR 144 east – Monrovia, Franklin	Eastern terminus of SR 42; western terminus of SR 144
Hendricks	No major junctions					
Marion	Indianapolis			Ameriplex Parkway		
Marion	Indianapolis	104.53	168.22	8	I-74 west / I-465 north / US 36 west / US 40 west	Southern end of I-74, I-465, US 36, & US 40 concurrencies
Marion	Indianapolis			7	Mann Road	Westbound exit and eastbound entrance
Marion	Indianapolis			5	I-69 south – Evansville	Interchange opened on August 6 and 9, 2024; southern end of I-69 concurrency; I-69 exit 163
Marion	Indianapolis			4	Harding Street	
Marion	Indianapolis			2	US 31 south / East Street – Greenwood	Southern end of US 31 concurrency; signed as exits 2A (north) and 2B (south)
Marion	Indianapolis			53	I-65 – Indianapolis, Louisville	Signed as exits 53A (north) and 53B (south)
Marion	Indianapolis			49	I-74 east / US 421 south / Southeastern Avenue – Cincinnati	Northern end of I-74 concurrency; southern end of US 421 concurrency
Marion	Indianapolis			47	US 52 east / Brookville Road – Cincinnati	Southern end of US 52 concurrency
Marion	Indianapolis			46	US 40 east / Washington Street – Richmond	Northern end of US 40 concurrency
Marion	Indianapolis			44	I-70 – Indianapolis, Dayton	Signed as exits 44A (west) and 44B (east) northbound
Marion	Lawrence	104.64	168.40	42	I-465 north / I-69 north / US 31 north / US 421 north – Fort Wayne; Pendleton Pike	Northern end of I-465, I-69, US 31, & US 421 concurrency
Hancock	Vernon Township				SR 234 east – New Castle	Western terminus of SR 234
Hancock	Fortville				SR 13 north – Lapel	Southern terminus of SR 13
Madison	Pendleton				SR 9 south – Greenfield	Southern end of SR 9 concurrency
Madison	Pendleton				SR 38 – New Castle	Southern end of SR 38 concurrency
Madison	Pendleton				US 36 east - Greenville	Eastern end of US 36 concurrency
Madison	Pendleton	136.52	219.71	222	I-69 south / SR 38 west – Indianapolis, Noblesville	Northern end of SR 38 concurrency; Southern end of I-69 concurrency
Madison	Anderson			226	SR 9 north / SR 109 south – Anderson	Northern end of SR 9 concurrency; Northern terminus of SR 109
Delaware	Salem Township	138.67	223.17	234	I-69 north – Fort Wayne	Northern end of I-69 concurrency
Delaware	Muncie	150.31	241.90	–	SR 3 south – New Castle	Southern end of SR 3 concurrency
Delaware	Muncie	151.61	243.99	–	US 35 south – Richmond	Southern end of US 35 concurrency
Delaware	Muncie			–	SR 32 – Muncie	
Delaware	Muncie	157.73	253.84	–	US 35 north / SR 3 north	Northern end of US 35 and SR 3 concurrences
Delaware	Delaware Township	161.20	259.43		SR 28 west – Elwood	Western end of SR 28 concurrency
Delaware	Albany	165.39	266.17		SR 28 east – Union City	Eastern end of SR 28 concurrency
Delaware	Albany	166.33	267.68		SR 167 north – Dunkirk	Southern terminus of SR 167
Jay	Redkey	172.17	277.08		SR 1 – Cambridge City, Bluffton	
Jay	Portland	181.58	292.22		SR 26 west	Western end of SR 26 concurrency
Jay	Portland	183.54	295.38		US 27 south / SR 26 east – Winchester	Eastern end of SR 26 concurrency; Southern end of US 27 concurrency
Jay	Bryant	190.73	306.95		US 27 north / SR 18 west – Decatur, Marion	Northern end of US 27 concurrency; Eastern end of SR 18
Jay	Bearcreek Township	199.24	320.65		SR 29 east – Celina	Northern terminus of SR 67
1.000 mi = 1.609 km; 1.000 km = 0.621 mi: Concurrency terminus

== Related routes ==
- SR 167 is a connector between SR 67 in Albany and SR 26. It is 10.45 miles (16.82 km) in length.
- SR 267 exists as a connector between I-65 and I-74 in Hendricks and Boone counties. With a length of only 8.7 miles (14.0 km), the route formerly extended down to SR 67 in Mooresville via Quaker Boulevard in Plainfield.
