= Interstate 865 =

Highway in Indiana

Interstate 865
- I-865 highlighted in red

Route information
- Auxiliary route of I-65
- Maintained by INDOT
- Length: 4.72 mi (7.60 km)
- Existed: 2002–present
- NHS: Entire route

Major junctions
- West end: I-65 / US 52 near Zionsville
- East end: I-465 / US 52 near Zionsville

Location
- Country: United States
- State: Indiana
- Counties: Boone

Highway system
- Interstate Highway System; Main; Auxiliary; Suffixed; Business; Future; Indiana State Highway System; Interstate; US; State; Scenic
← SR 827	→ SR 912

Interstate 865 (I-865) is an east–west auxiliary Interstate Highway northwest of Indianapolis, Indiana, United States. It is a short connector between I-65 and I-465, running for five miles (8.0 km) and completely concurrent with U.S. Route 52 (US 52). The highway was originally numbered as a branch of I-465 but was renumbered in 2002 to prevent I-465 from intersecting with itself. This section was previously known as the Dog Leg, and the mile markers ran from 900 to 905.

== Route description ==
I-865 begins at an interchange with I-65 in the northwest outskirts of Indianapolis, near Zionsville. The interchange allows for traffic from southbound I-65 to continue east onto I-865 and connects traffic from westbound I-865 to northbound I-65 but prohibits other movements. US 52 is concurrent with the entire length of the four-lane freeway as it travels east across several farms and suburban neighborhoods on the south side of Zionsville. After 4.7 miles (7.6 km), I-865 terminates at a three-way interchange with I-465, which continues around Indianapolis as a beltway.

I-865 has interchanges only at its eastern terminus at I-465 and its western terminus at I-65. It is one of the few Interstates that have interchanges only at their termini and none in between. Other examples include I-587 in Kingston, New York; I-381 in Bristol, Virginia; the future I-222; I-495 in Maine; and I-189 in Chittenden County, Vermont.

The highway is maintained by the Indiana Department of Transportation (INDOT). In 2022, INDOT measured annual average daily traffic on I-865 at 34,304 vehicles.

== History ==
I-865 was originally part of I-465. Original plans were for I-465 to run east from exit 129 of I-65 around the city to exit 123 of I-65. The north–south section of the current I-465 between I-65 and the current I-865 was originally not part of I-465. Instead, it was built to Interstate standards as State Road 100 (SR 100). In January 1970, seven months before it was completed, the federal government approved the request to make it part of I-465. This resulted in an unusual Y interchange of all three branches of I-465 at the current junction of I-865 and I-465. The stretch of I-465 that is now I-865 was given milemarkers starting with 900 to distinguish it from the main portion of the highway.

The unusual configuration caused confusion among motorists, being described as "the 465 connector", "the 465 extension", "the 465 dogleg", "465 second section", and "the 465 ramp to 65 north". The May 2002 redesignation of this branch of I-465 to I-865 fixed that problem. The renumbering was approved by the Special Committee on U.S. Route Numbering of the American Association of State Highway and Transportation Officials (AASHTO) in October 2002.

At the time of the redesignation, officials chose "I-865" rather than the also available "I-665" because they concluded that 9-1-1 operators would more easily understand the combination of "8" and "65".

== Exit list ==
The entire route is in Eagle Township, Boone County.

mi	km	Destinations	Notes
0.00	0.00	I-65 north / US 52 west – Gary, Chicago	Western terminus; western end of US 52 concurrency; I-65 exit 129
4.72	7.60	I-465 / US 52 east – Indianapolis, Speedway	Eastern terminus; eastern end of US 52 concurrency; I-465 exit 25
1.000 mi = 1.609 km; 1.000 km = 0.621 mi: Concurrency terminus
