= Indiana State Road 431 =

State highway in Indiana, United States

State Road 431
- SR 431 highlighted in red

Route information
- Maintained by INDOT
- Length: 20.0 mi (32.2 km)

Madison Avenue segment
- Length: 8.4 mi (13.5 km)
- South end: US 31 in Greenwood
- North end: US 31 at Indianapolis

Keystone Avenue segment
- Length: 11.6 mi (18.7 km)
- South end: SR 37 in Indianapolis
- Major intersections: I-465 / US 31 / US 52 / US 421 in Indianapolis
- North end: US 31 at Carmel

Location
- Country: United States
- State: Indiana
- Counties: Johnson, Marion, Hamilton

Highway system
- Indiana State Highway System; Interstate; US; State; Scenic
← SR 427	→ SR 441

State Road 431 was a state road connecting U.S. Route 31 with Interstate 465 at Exit 33. It passed through the Indianapolis suburb of Carmel, allowing traffic on U.S. 31 north of Carmel a shorter route to I-465 and the east side of Indianapolis. Until the 1990s, the SR 431 designation extended south of I-465 to 86th Street. Prior to that, it also continued south along N. Keystone Avenue to State Road 37 at Fall Creek Parkway, North Drive in Indianapolis. A second section of SR 431 followed the old route of U.S. 31 between Greenwood and the south side of Indianapolis.

== Route description ==
=== Southern section ===
Beginning at a junction with US 31 in Greenwood, SR 431 traveled along Madison Avenue northwest to the south side of Indianapolis. On Madison Avenue, SR 431 passed through a mix of residential and commercial properties. The suburban surroundings dominated much of the route until it began to encroach on the outskirts of Indianapolis. The highway terminated at US 31, now S. East Street, in Indianapolis.

=== Northern section ===
Beginning at a junction with SR 37 just northeast of downtown Indianapolis, SR 431 traveled north along Keystone Avenue. While on Keystone Avenue, SR 431 passed through a mix of residential and commercial properties. The highway passed through an interchange with 86th Street (formerly SR 100) and Interstate 465. The highway terminated at US 31 in Carmel.

== History ==
The original SR 431 designation was assigned to the former routing of US 31 that ran along Westfield Boulevard in Broad Ripple, Nora, and into Carmel (where it became Range Line Road, so-named because it was on a survey Range Line, and also because the "Auto Trail" from Indianapolis to Kokomo was named the "Range Line Highway"). When US 31 was designated in 1926, it followed that route through Broad Ripple. By 1931, a new US 31 had been built from Westfield Boulevard and Meridian Street, north into Carmel, and along what is now Old Meridian Street in that city. The original US 31 was renumbered SR 431.

The southern section of SR 431 was created when the US 31 bypass of Greenwood and Southport was built between 1940 and 1945. This section extended south along Madison Avenue from the south side of Indianapolis through Greenwood. Madison Avenue was the original routing of U.S. 31 on the south side of Indianapolis. The northern terminus of this section was at Madison's intersection with East Street, which formerly carried U.S. 31 from downtown to the south. The southern terminus was where Madison merges with existing U.S. 31 alignment in Johnson County just south of Smith Valley Road, south of Greenwood Middle School.

The northern section of SR 431 was moved when the Keystone Avenue construction, along with the I-465 construction, was completed in 1967. Around 1965, SR 431 began at the junction of SR 37 at Fall Creek Parkway, north along Keystone Avenue to the interchange at 86th Street, then west along 86th Street (at the time, SR 100) to Westfield Boulevard, then north into Carmel. With the completion of I-465 in the area, SR 431 was removed completely from Westfield Boulevard.

SR 431 was officially decommissioned on October 19, 2007, with the portions north of 96th Street being turned over to the city of Carmel. Carmel Mayor James Brainard immediately proposed banning heavy trucks from the route, the Hamilton County portion of which lies within his city's corporate limits. At this point, the street name was changed from Keystone Avenue (a designation that remains south of the county line at 96th Street in Indianapolis) to Keystone Parkway. Brainard also pushed for a plan to build six roundabout-style ("dogbone") interchanges on Keystone, built 2009–2010, in lieu of widening it to at least six travel lanes throughout. On December 30, 2019, another such interchange was opened at the junction with 96th Street.

== Major intersections ==
County	Location	mi	km	Destinations	Notes
Johnson	Greenwood			US 31	
Marion	Indianapolis			US 31	
Gap in route
Marion	Indianapolis			SR 37	
Marion	Indianapolis			I-465	
Hamilton	Carmel			US 31	
1.000 mi = 1.609 km; 1.000 km = 0.621 mi
