= Airport Expressway =

An airport expressway is an expressway connecting to the airport as a road for vehicles going to the airport.

Airport Expressway may also refer to:

== Roads ==
=== Canada ===
- The portion of Highway 427 between Highway 401 and Highway 409 in Toronto, Ontario, Canada from 1964 to 1971
- Unofficially Ontario Highway 409 or Belfield Expressway is an Airport Expressway as the road connects Highway 401 to Toronto-Pearson International Airport

=== China ===
- Airport Expressway (Beijing) in Beijing, China

=== Philippines ===
- Ninoy Aquino International Airport Expressway, an elevated airport expressway in Manila, Philippines
- The portion of Subic–Clark–Tarlac Expressway between Clark South Interchange and Clark North Interchange located in Clark Freeport Zone

=== Sri Lanka ===
- Colombo - Katunayake Expressway in Sri Lanka between Bandaranaike International Airport, Katunayake and Colombo

=== United States ===
- Airport Expressway (Fort Wayne, Indiana) in Fort Wayne, Indiana, United States
- The Sam Jones Expressway in Indianapolis, Indiana, United States, formerly known as the Airport Expressway
- Airport Expressway in Miami, Florida, United States
- A one-mile portion of New York State Route 204 near Rochester, New York, United States

== See also ==
- Airport Parkway
