= Interstate 65 in Indiana =

Highway in Indiana

Interstate 65
- I-65 highlighted in red

Route information
- Maintained by INDOT
- Length: 261.27 mi (420.47 km)
- Existed: 1956–present
- NHS: Entire route

Major junctions
- South end: I-65 Toll at the Kentucky state line in Jeffersonville
- I-265 / SR 62 in Jeffersonville; I-69 / I-74 / I-465 in Indianapolis; I-70 in Indianapolis; I-465 in Indianapolis; I-865 / US 52 in Indianapolis; I-80 / I-94 / US 6 in Gary; I-90 Toll / Indiana Toll Road in Gary
- North end: US 12 / US 20 in Gary

Location
- Country: United States
- State: Indiana
- Counties: Clark, Scott, Jackson, Bartholomew, Shelby, Johnson, Marion, Hendricks, Boone, Clinton, Tippecanoe, White, Jasper, Newton, Lake

Highway system
- Interstate Highway System; Main; Auxiliary; Suffixed; Business; Future; Indiana State Highway System; Interstate; US; State; Scenic
← SR 64	→ SR 65

Interstate 65 (I-65) in the US state of Indiana traverses from the south-southeastern Falls City area bordering Louisville, Kentucky, through the centrally located capital city of Indianapolis, to the northwestern Calumet Region of the Hoosier State which is part of the Chicago metropolitan area. The Indiana portion of I-65 begins in Jeffersonville after crossing the Ohio River and travels mainly north, passing just west of Columbus prior to reaching the Indianapolis metro area. Upon reaching Indianapolis, the route alignment of I-65 begins to run more to the northwest and subsequently passes Lafayette on that city's east and north sides. Northwest of there, in west-central Jasper County, the route again curves more northward as it approaches the Calumet Region. Shortly after passing a major junction with I-80 and I-94, I-65 reaches its northern national terminus in Gary at US Highway 12/US Highway 20 (US 12/US 20, Dunes Highway) after an interchange with the Indiana Toll Road (I-90). I-65 covers 261.27 miles (420.47 km) in the state of Indiana. This is one of the principal Interstate Highways that cross the state, and, more specifically, intersect at the city of Indianapolis, that has given the state the nickname of "Crossroads of America".

== Route description ==
I-65 enters the state northbound at Jeffersonville (across the Ohio River from Louisville, Kentucky) on the Abraham Lincoln Bridge; traffic exiting the state travels on the John F. Kennedy Memorial Bridge. I-65 travels past Clark State Forest before reaching Seymour to the north. I-65 intersects with U.S. Highway 50 (US 50), providing access to Seymour to the west. US 31 runs parallel to the Interstate until it reaches Indianapolis. North of Seymour, I-65 passes through Columbus. Just north of Columbus, I-65 runs near Camp Atterbury, an Indiana National Guard training base. The Interstate continues north into Indianapolis.

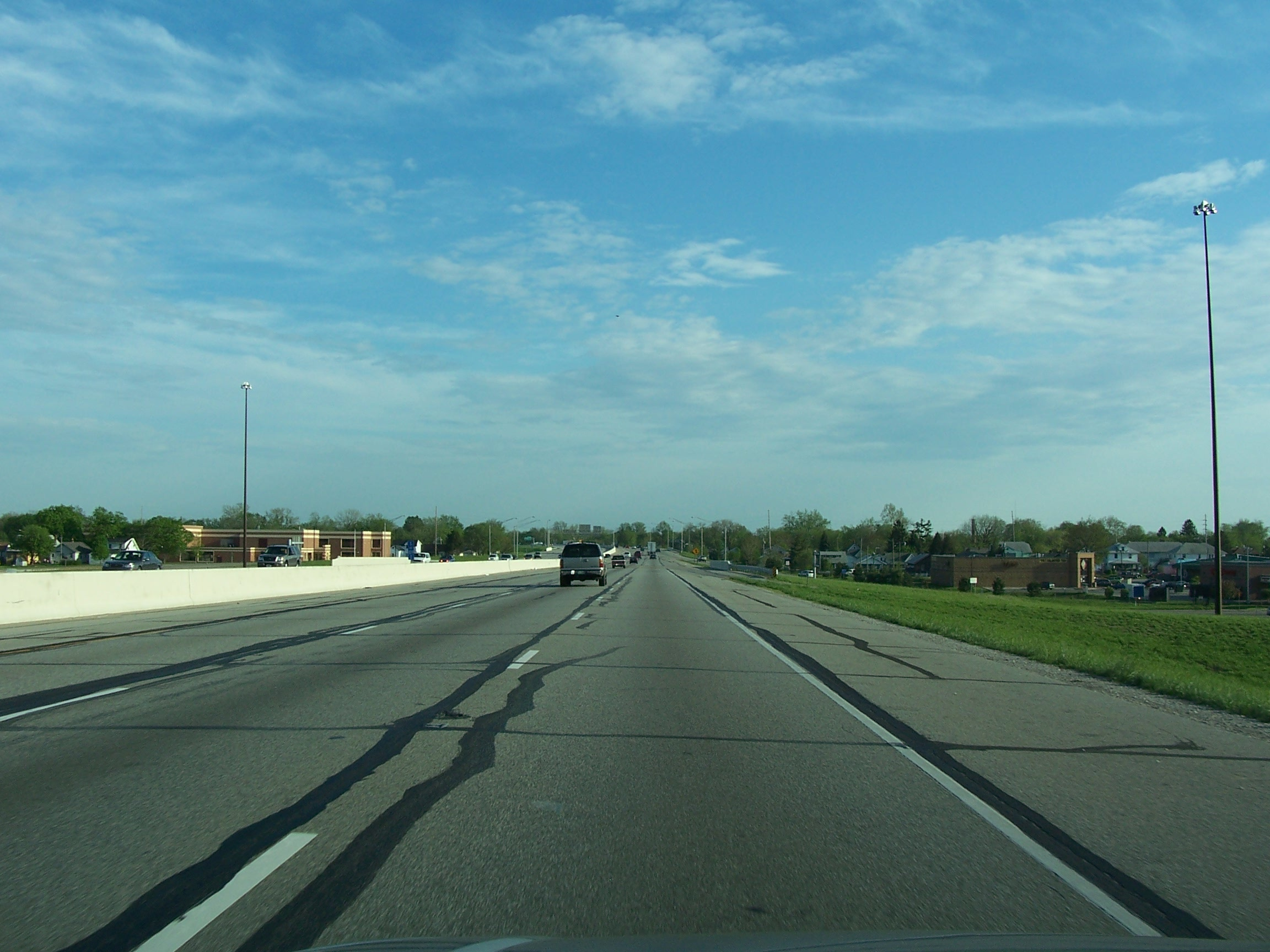
I-65 just outside Indianapolis

I-65 crosses the I-465 loop before reaching Indianapolis. The section of I-65 in Downtown Indianapolis overlaps I-70. The junctions are often referred to as the "North Split" and the "South Split", forming a section of Interstate locally known as the "Inner Loop" or "Spaghetti Bowl" due to the visual complexity of the overlapping freeways. The "North Split" was closed for reconstruction in early 2021 and reopened to traffic in May 2023. As part of that reconstruction, the old ramps were replaced with ones that eliminate the lane switching that drivers originally had to perform to stay on I-70 eastbound and I-65 northbound.

In 1999, the 25-mile (40 km) segment of I-65 between the two I-465 interchanges was renamed the Kenneth "Babyface" Edmonds Highway. At milemarker 116, I-65 passes Crown Hill Cemetery, burial site and memorial of former-President Benjamin Harrison. I-65 leaves the I-465 loop on the northwest side of Indianapolis. The highway travels past Eagle Creek Park and it then passes the terminus of I-865 and picks up US 52.

The segment of I-65 north of Indianapolis heads in the direction of Chicago, Illinois. US 52 runs concurrently until the north side of Lebanon; US 52 runs parallel to I-65 from this point to Lafayette, located at about the halfway point between Indianapolis and Chicago. I-65 crosses the Wabash River in Lafayette and passes next to Prophetstown State Park.

North of Lafayette, I-65 parallels US 231 and passes through the open flatlands of northwest Indiana. Protruding from the fields are some of the hundreds of wind turbines of the Benton County Wind Farm and Fowler Ridge Wind Farm. At approximately mile 199.4 is the time zone boundary between Central Time (Jasper County) and Eastern Time (White County). The Indiana Department of Transportation (INDOT) marked change in time zone with a two-sided blue sign in the center median.

Upon crossing into Lake County, over the Kankakee River, the highway is known as the Casimir Pulaski Memorial Highway. It is known as this from that point to its northern terminus. The northern terminus of I-65 is only 0.125 miles (0.201 km) north of I-90 (Indiana Toll Road) in Gary.

== History ==
=== Initial construction ===
Like all Interstate Highways in Indiana, I-65 was constructed in segments. There were six segments in the southern portion of the state between the Kentucky border and the south leg of I-465 in Indianapolis, nine within the I-465 loop and 11 more that made up the northern portion connecting the northwest side of Indianapolis to the Indiana Toll Road (I-90) in Gary.

The first section of I-65 to be completed in Indiana was the 16 miles (26 km) section between Jefferson and SR 160 in Henryville, which was dedicated and opened by then-Governor Harold W. Handley on September 14, 1960. The 13.39-mile (21.55 km) stretch between a temporary connection with US 52 near Royalton in Boone County (just south of the present-day interchange with I-865) and the US 52 junction northwest of Lebanon opened in December 1960. The initial southern Indiana portion, running 45.71 miles (73.56 km) between then-US 31E (now US 31) in Clarksville and US 50 east of Seymour, saw its first traffic in November 1961. The final of the 17 segments of I-65 outside of I-465, 23.09 miles (37.16 km) from State Road 252 (SR 252) near Edinburgh to Southport Road on Indianapolis's far south side, opened on June 30, 1972.

Unlike for most of portions of I-70 within the I-465 beltway, several inner sections of I-65 were built throughout the overall project lifespan. However, the final three segments from the south side through the heart of the city, including the common portion of I-65 and I-70 (east leg of the "Inner Belt"), were not finished and opened to traffic until October 1976.

=== Subsequent improvements ===
Prior to 2004, the interchange from the Indiana Toll Road to southbound I-65 required making a physical left turn onto I-65 via a traffic signal; traffic from northbound I-65 to I-90 bypassed the traffic signal via an isolated right-turn lane. This deficiency has since been corrected by a grade-separation.

As part of the Operation Indy Commute project, INDOT began work in 2013 to widen I-65 on both northbound and southbound mainlines from exit 103 at Southport Road northward to the southern junction with I-465 (exit 106), adding auxiliary lanes in this section to improve merging of traffic entering southbound I-65 from I-465 and entering northbound I-65 from westbound Southport Road. To reduce congestion on I-65 South from I-465 west, the loop ramp from westbound I-465 was replaced by a flyover ramp to southbound I-65. The eastbound I-465 exit to southbound I-65 south was also expanded for improved merging with traffic from the new west-to-south flyover. Most of this work was completed in late 2014.

== Exit list ==
County	Location	mi	km	Exit	Destinations	Notes
Ohio River		0.00	0.00		I-65 Toll south (John F. Kennedy Memorial Bridge) – Louisville	Continuation into Kentucky
Ohio River		0.00	0.00	Abraham Lincoln Bridge (northbound toll in Kentucky); John F. Kennedy Memorial Bridge (southbound toll in Kentucky)		
Clark	Jeffersonville	0.32	0.51	0	Court Avenue / 6th Street	No southbound exit
Clark	Jeffersonville–Clarksville line	0.62– 1.73	1.00– 2.78	1	10th Street / Stansifer Avenue – New Albany US 31 south – Jeffersonville, Clarksville	Northbound signage; US 31 serves as service drives for I-65 through exit 4 Southbound signage; last southbound exit before toll
Clark	Jeffersonville–Clarksville line	2.07	3.33	2	Eastern Boulevard	
Clark	Jeffersonville–Clarksville line	3.82	6.15	4	US 31 north / Lewis & Clark Parkway	Formerly SR 131
Clark	Clarksville	5.03	8.10	5	Veterans Parkway	
Clark	Clarksville	5.70	9.17	6	I-265 / SR 62 – New Albany, Jeffersonville	I-265 exits 34A-B; signed as exits 6A (east) & 6B (west)
Clark	Sellersburg	7.36	11.84	7	SR 60 – Salem	
Clark	Sellersburg	9.10	14.65	9	Charlestown Road – Speed, Sellersburg, New Albany	Formerly SR 311
Clark	Memphis	15.78	25.40	16	Blue Lick Road	
Clark	Henryville	19.25	30.98	19	SR 160 – Charlestown, Henryville	
Scott	Scottsburg	29.32	47.19	29	SR 56 (McClane Avenue) – Scottsburg, Salem	Signed as exits 29A (east) and 29B (west) southbound
Scott	Austin	33.50	53.91	34	SR 256 (Main Street) – Austin	Signed as exits 34A (east) and 34B (west) southbound
Jackson	Vernon Township	36.52	58.77	36	US 31 (Armstrong Street) – Crothersville, Austin	
Jackson	Vernon Township	41.08	66.11	41	SR 250 – Uniontown, Crothersville	
Jackson	Seymour	49.55	79.74	50	US 50 (Tipton Street) – North Vernon, Seymour, Brownstown	Signed as exits 50A (east) and 50B (west)
Jackson	Redding Township	55.32	89.03	55	SR 11 – Jonesville, Seymour	
Bartholomew	Columbus	63.72	102.55	64	SR 58 west (450 South) – Walesboro, Ogilville	
Bartholomew	Columbus	68.29	109.90	68	SR 46 (Jonathan Moore Pike) – Nashville, Columbus, Bloomington	
Bartholomew	Taylorsville	75.74	121.89	76	US 31 – Taylorsville, Columbus, Edinburgh	Signed as exits 76A (south) and 76B (north)
Shelby	Jackson Township	80.06	128.84	80	SR 252 (Shelbyville Road) – Edinburgh, Flat Rock	
Johnson	Franklin	89.54	144.10	90	SR 44 (King Street) – Shelbyville, Franklin	
Johnson	Pleasant Township	94.41	151.94	95	Whiteland Road – Whiteland	
Johnson	Pleasant Township	97.22	156.46	97	Worthsville Road	Diverging diamond interchange opened November 23, 2015
Johnson	Greenwood	99.13	159.53	99	Main Street	
Johnson–Marion county line	Greenwood–Indianapolis line	100.65	161.98	101	County Line Road	
Marion	Indianapolis	103.03	165.81	103	Southport Road	
Marion	Indianapolis	105.90	170.43	106	I-465 / I-69 / I-74 / US 31 / US 36 / US 40 / SR 67 – Peoria, Cincinnati, Fort Wayne, Evansville	I-465 exits 53A-B
Marion	Indianapolis	107.05	172.28	107	Keystone Avenue	
Marion	Indianapolis	108.90	175.26	109	Raymond Street	
Marion	Indianapolis	109.97	176.98	110A	Morris Street, Prospect Street	Northbound exit; Southbound entrance
Marion	Indianapolis	110.10	177.19	110B	I-70 west – St. Louis	Southern end of I-70 concurrency; I-70 east exit 80; northbound left exit to westbound I-70, left entrance by eastbound I-70; access to Indianapolis International Airport
Marion	Indianapolis	110.39	177.66	110A	East Street	Southbound exit only
Marion	Indianapolis	110.52	177.86	111	Fletcher Avenue	Southbound exit (from C/D lanes) and northbound left entrance (via Calvary Street)
Marion	Indianapolis	111.02	178.67	111	Washington Street	Northbound exit and southbound entrance (to C/D lanes); formerly US 40/US 52/US 421
Marion	Indianapolis	111.20	178.96	111	Ohio Street	Southbound exit (from C/D lanes) and northbound entrance via Pine Street (at Michigan Street)
Marion	Indianapolis	111.49	179.43	111	New York Street, Michigan Street	Southbound exit (from C/D lanes) via Davidson Street (at North Street) and northbound entrance via Pine Street (at Michigan Street)
Marion	Indianapolis	111.60	179.60	112	I-70 east – Columbus, Dayton	Northern end of I-70 concurrency; I-70 west exit 83B; split entrance from Pine Street (at Michigan Street) onto eastbound I-70 and left entry onto northbound I-65
Marion	Indianapolis	112.96	181.79	113	Pennsylvania Street, Meridian Street, Illinois Street	Split diamond interchange: Northbound exit to 12th Street (at Pennsylvania) and entrance (from 12th at Illinois); southbound exit to 11th Street (at Illinois) and entry (from 11th at Delaware Street); formerly US 31/SR 37
Marion	Indianapolis	113.51	182.68	114	Dr. Martin Luther King Jr. Street to West Street	Formerly US 36/US 52/US 421/SR 67
Marion	Indianapolis	114.26	183.88	115	21st Street	
Marion	Indianapolis	115.32	185.59	116	29th Street, 30th Street	29th and 30th streets form a one-way pairing; no southbound exit or access from 29th Street to north I-65
Marion	Indianapolis	115.79	186.35	117	Dr. Martin Luther King Jr. Street	No northbound exit; formerly US 36/US 421/SR 67
Marion	Indianapolis	118.89	191.33	119	38th Street	Directional access only; 38th Street serves as collector/distributor lanes for interchange with Kessler Boulevard and right-in/right-out access to/from Guion Road (no access to northbound I-65 from Guion)
Marion	Indianapolis	120.69	194.23	121	Lafayette Road	Formerly US 52
Marion	Indianapolis	122.69– 123.28	197.45– 198.40	123	I-465	Same-directional access only; I-465 exit 20; access to Indianapolis International Airport
Marion	Indianapolis	124.17	199.83	124	71st Street	
Hendricks	No major junctions					
Boone	Eagle Township	129.09	207.75	129	I-865 east / US 52 east to I-465 east	Southern end of US 52 concurrency; western terminus of I-865; southbound exit and northbound entrance
Boone	Eagle Township	129.85	208.97	130	CR 650 South/Oak Street – Zionsville, Whitestown	Formerly SR 334
Boone	Eagle Township	131.4	211.5	131	CR 550 South – Whitestown	Diverging diamond interchange opened on June 26, 2023
Boone	Perry Township	133.08	214.17	133	SR 267 south – Brownsburg, Whitestown	Diamond interchange rebuilt into a Diverging diamond interchange
Boone	Lebanon	137.44	221.19	138	Lebanon	Access via Hall Baker Road/Indianapolis Avenue
Boone	Lebanon	138.61	223.07	139	SR 39 (Lebanon Street) – Lizton, Lebanon	
Boone	Lebanon	139.88	225.12	140	SR 32 (South Street) – Lebanon, Crawfordsville	
Boone	Lebanon	141.29	227.38	141	Lafayette Avenue	Southbound left-hand exit permanently closed; northbound entrance only; to be replaced with new exit 143
Boone	Center Township	141.61	227.90	141	US 52 west	Former north end of US 52 concurrency; former northbound exit and southbound entrance; Closed October 2, 2026 and replaced by exit 143
Boone	Lebanon	143.0	230.1	143	US 52 west / LEAP Lebanon Boulevard – Lafayette, Lebanon	New diverging diamond interchange opened on October 2, 2026; north end of US 52 concurrency
Boone	Washington Township	145.61	234.34	146	SR 47 – Thorntown, Sheridan	
Clinton	Washington Township	157.56	253.57	158	SR 28 – Frankfort, Attica	
Tippecanoe	Dayton	168.16	270.63	168	SR 38 (Walnut Street) – Dayton, Lafayette	
Tippecanoe	Lafayette	171.73	276.37	172	SR 26 east / South Street – Lafayette, Rossville	Western end of eastern segment of SR 26
Tippecanoe	Lafayette	174.77	281.27	175	SR 25 east / Schuyler Avenue – Lafayette, Delphi	Southern end of the northern segment of SR 25
Tippecanoe	West Lafayette	177.90	286.30	178	SR 43 north / River Road – Brookston, West Lafayette	Southern end of SR 43
White	Prairie Township	187.54	301.82	188	SR 18 – Brookston, Fowler	
White	West Point Township	192.96	310.54	193	US 231 – Chalmers, Wolcott	
Jasper	Carpenter Township	200.94	323.38	201	US 24 / US 231 – Wolcott, Remington	
Jasper	Carpenter Township	204.51	329.13	205	US 231 – Remington, Rensselaer	
Jasper	Newton Township	214.24	344.79	215	SR 114 – Morocco, Rensselaer	
Jasper	Newton–Union township line	219.94	353.96	220	SR 14 – Winamac	
Jasper	Keener Township	229.00	368.54	230	SR 10 – Roselawn, DeMotte	
Newton	No major junctions					
Lake	Eagle Creek Township	239.31	385.13	240	SR 2 (181st Avenue) – Lowell, Hebron	Hebron signed northbound only
Lake	Crown Point	246.68	396.99	247	US 231 – Crown Point, Hebron	Hebron signed southbound only
Lake	Crown Point	249.48	401.50	249	109th Avenue – Crown Point, Winfield	Interchange opened September 30, 2010
Lake	Merrillville	252.06	405.65	253	US 30 (Lincoln Highway) – Merrillville, Valparaiso, Schererville	
Lake	Merrillville	254.57	409.69	255	61st Avenue	
Lake	Hobart–Lake Station line	257.67	414.68	258	US 6 Bus. (Ridge Road)	
Lake	Gary	259.06	416.92	259	I-80 / I-94 / US 6 (Borman Expressway) – Chicago, Toledo, Detroit	I-80/I-94 exits 11-12; signed as exits 259A (west) & 259B (east)
Lake	Gary	260.59– 261.22	419.38– 420.39	261	15th Avenue	
Lake	Gary	260.59– 261.22	419.38– 420.39	262	I-90 Toll / Indiana Toll Road – Chicago, Ohio	I-90 / Toll Road exit 17; northbound exit and southbound entrance
Lake	Gary	261.27	420.47		US 12 / US 20 / LMCT (Dunes Highway) – Portage, Gary	At-grade intersection; northern terminus
1.000 mi = 1.609 km; 1.000 km = 0.621 mi: Concurrency terminus; Incomplete access; Tolled; Unopened

== Related routes ==
=== Auxiliary routes ===
I-65 has three auxiliary routes in Indiana:

- I-265: The Indiana segment of the incomplete beltway around the Louisville metropolitan area, running from I-65 in Clarksville to I-64 in New Albany and signed the Lee Hamilton Freeway. The Indiana segment, plus the Lewis and Clark Bridge across the Ohio River to connect the Indiana segment of I-265 with the Kentucky segment, was completed in December 2016 but is currently not signed as I-265 between I-65 and the new bridge.
- I-465: A beltway around Indianapolis, signed as the USS Indianapolis Memorial Highway.
- I-865: A connector from I-65 to the northwest corner of I-465 in Indianapolis.

=== Interstate 65 Business ===
Interstate 65 Business
- Location: Lebanon
- Existed: 1959–1995

Business Loop 65 (BL 65) is a former business route of I-65 located in Lebanon and was the only business route for the entire route of I-65. The route took over the former alignment of US 52 and traveled up SR 39 (South Lebanon Street) from I-65 and then SR 32 (West South Street) back to I-65.

Major intersections

The entire route was in Boone County.

Location	mi	km	Destinations	Notes
			S 100 E	Continuation beyond I-65
			I-65 (US 52) – Chicago, Indianapolis	Southern terminus
			Indianapolis Avenue south	Former US 52
Lebanon			Noble Street	
Lebanon			SR 32 east (Spencer Avenue)	Southern end of SR 32 concurrency
Lebanon			Indianapolis Avenue north	
Lebanon			SR 39 (Lebanon Street)	
Lebanon			Main Street	Now Ping Avenue and Now Ping Drive
Lebanon			I-65 (US 52) – Chicago, Indianapolis	Northern terminus; northern end of SR 32 concurrency
Lebanon			SR 32 west – Crawfordsville	Continuation beyond I-65
1.000 mi = 1.609 km; 1.000 km = 0.621 mi: Concurrency terminus

Interstate 65
Previous state: Kentucky	Indiana	Next state: Terminus
