= Keystone Avenue =

Keystone Avenue may refer to one of the following roads:

- Indiana State Road 431
- Nevada State Route 657
