= Washington Street (Indianapolis) =

Primary east–west street in Indianapolis, Indiana, US

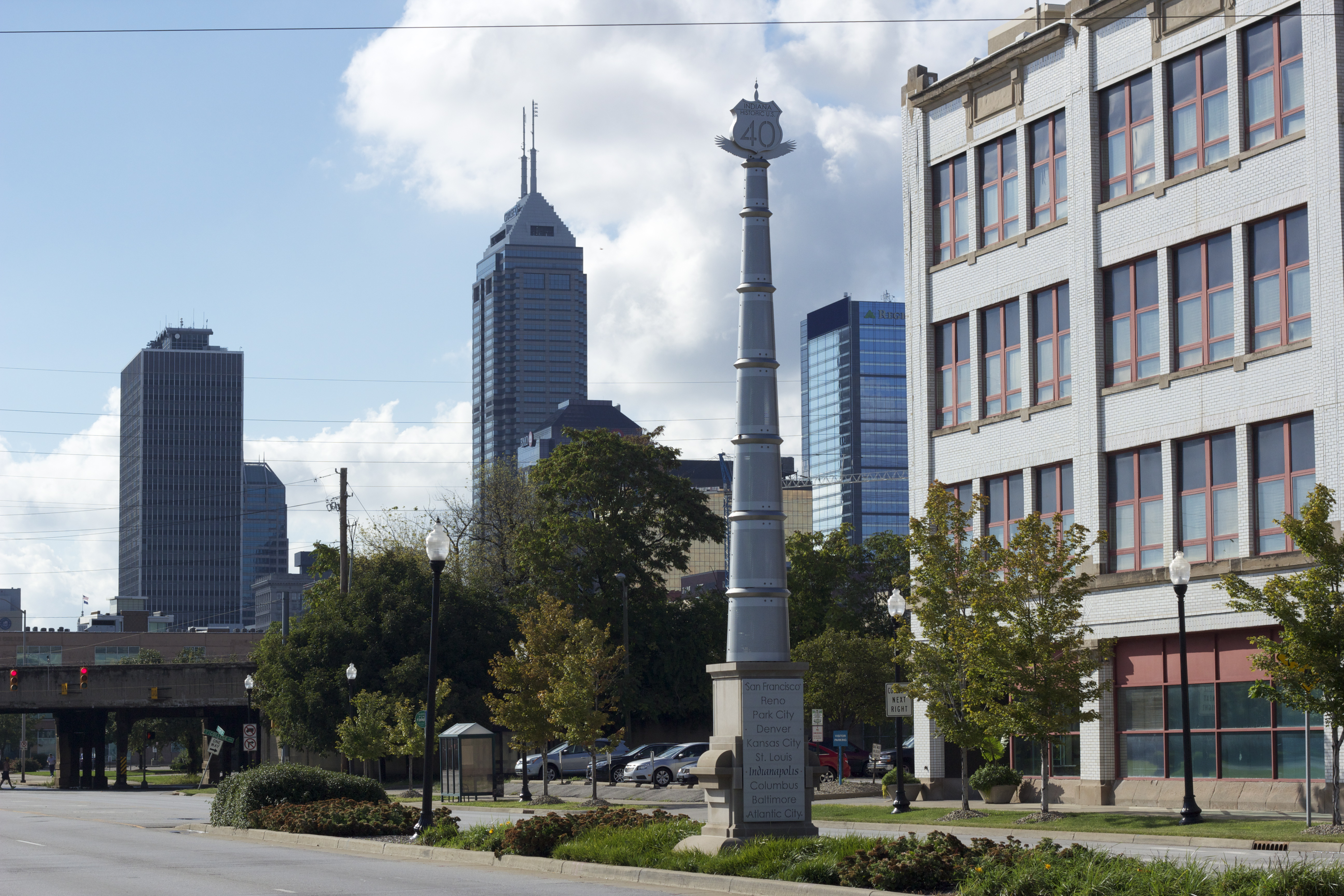
- Washington Street with the US 40 monument in the median
- Former name: National Road
- Length: 20.5 mi (33.0 km)
- Location: Indianapolis and Cumberland, Indiana, United States
- West end: Raceway Road
- Major junctions: I-74 / I-465 / US 36 near IND; I-65 / I-70 at Downtown; I-69 / I-465 / US 31 / US 36 / US 52 / US 421 / SR 67 at Warren
- East end: Carroll Road in Cumberland

Washington Street is the primary east–west street in Indianapolis, Indiana, United States. The street follows the route of the National Road for nearly the entirety of its length in the city. For a time, its entire length was designated as US 40 before that highway was re-aligned with the southern segment of Interstate 465 (I-465); now only the segments of Washington Street between I-465 and the city limits on either side of the city are part of US 40.

Washington Street serves as Indianapolis's baseline, forming the origin of north–south address numbering for the city's eastern two-thirds. Meridian Street, the principal meridian for the city's east–west address numbering, intersects Washington immediately south of Monument Circle in downtown Indianapolis.

== Route description ==
Washington Street begins in the west at the intersection with Raceway Road. As it heads east-northeast, it passes by the Indianapolis International Airport, which lies to south. Immediately thereafter, it has an interchange with I-465 on the west side of the city, where US 40 diverges. After merging with Rockville Road, Washington Street heads more directly east toward downtown Indianapolis. Approaching downtown it passes the Indiana Medical History Museum on the former site of Central State Hospital for the Insane; it then passes the headquarters of the Indianapolis Public Transportation Corporation, which is in buildings that once housed the Duesenberg Automobile and Motors Company.

On the west side of downtown, Washington Street passes by the Indianapolis Zoo and White River Gardens, crosses the White River, and traverses White River State Park, with the Indiana State Museum and Eiteljorg Museum of American Indians and Western Art on the north side of the street and Victory Field on the south. Within downtown, the street carries only westbound traffic; eastbound traffic is routed a block south to Maryland Street where it passes by the Indiana Convention Center. Among the buildings directly on Washington Street within the central business district are (from west to east): the Indiana Statehouse; the Indiana Theatre, home of the Indiana Repertory Theatre; the headquarters of the Simon Property Group; the Circle Centre shopping mall; the Barnes and Thornburg Building (which until the 1960s was the tallest building in the city); and the City-County Building. Washington also runs under the Indianapolis Artsgarden, a suspended glass structure at the intersection with Illinois Street. Washington does not intersect Monument Circle (the city's town square); rather, the Circle is located on Market Street, one block north of the intersection of Washington with Meridian Street.

On the eastern edge of downtown, Washington Street has an interchange with the I-65/I-70 "Inner Loop". As it continues east, it travels through or by the Cole-Noble and Rural-Sherman neighborhoods. In the Irvington Historic District, an early suburb of Indianapolis, Washington crosses Pleasant Run Creek with its associated parkway and trail. On the far east side of the city, US 40 again joins Washington Street at the interchange with I-465 and I-69. The street travels south of the Washington Square Mall as it approaches Cumberland, Indiana, where it terminates at Carroll Road.

== See also ==
- Transportation in Indianapolis
