= Indiana State Road 38 =

Highway in Indiana

State Road 38
- Bataan Memorial Highway
- SR 38 highlighted in red

Route information
- Maintained by INDOT
- Length: 121.071 mi (194.845 km)
- Existed: October 1, 1926–present

Major junctions
- West end: Sagamore Parkway/Main Street in Lafayette
- I-65 in Dayton; US 421 at Kirklin; US 31 near Westfield; SR 32 at Noblesville; SR 37 near Noblesville; I-69 at Pendleton; I-69 at Anderson; US 36 at Pendleton; SR 3 at New Castle
- East end: US 35 in Richmond

Location
- Country: United States
- State: Indiana
- Counties: Tippecanoe, Clinton, Boone, Hamilton, Madison, Henry, Wayne

Highway system
- Indiana State Highway System; Interstate; US; State; Scenic
← SR 37	→ SR 39

State Road 38 (SR 38) in the U.S. state of Indiana serves as a connection between Lafayette in the west and Richmond in the east.

== Route description ==
SR 38 begins in Lafayette at the intersections of Sagamore Parkway and Main Street, just north of US 52. There is an interchange with I-65 at exit 168. It proceeds east-southeast through Frankfort and Sheridan, then through the north Indianapolis suburb of Noblesville. It continues through Pendleton where it crosses I-69, then on through New Castle and Hagerstown. SR 38 terminates in Richmond, where it meets US 35, just north of I-70.

== Major intersections ==
County	Location	mi	km	Exit	Destinations	Notes
Tippecanoe	Lafayette	0.000	0.000		Sagamore Parkway – Lebanon, Fowler; Main Street – Purdue University	Western terminus of SR 38
Tippecanoe	Dayton	4.305– 4.577	6.928– 7.366		I-65 – Indianapolis, Gary, Logansport	
Clinton	Washington Township	16.391	26.379		US 421 north / SR 39 north – Delphi	Northern end of US 421 and SR 39 concurrency
Clinton	Frankfort	21.353	34.364		SR 75 north	
Clinton	Frankfort	22.209	35.742		US 421 south / SR 28	Southern end of US 421 concurrency
Clinton	Jackson Township	25.802	41.524		SR 39 south	Southern end of SR 39 concurrency
Clinton	Kirklin	34.254	55.126		US 421 – Indianapolis	
Hamilton	Sheridan	45.358	72.997		SR 47 south	Northern terminus of SR 47
Hamilton	Washington Township	50.296– 50.573	80.944– 81.389		US 31 – Indianapolis, Kokomo, South Bend	
Hamilton	Noblesville	56.832	91.462		SR 32 west – Westfield	Western end of SR 32 concurrency
Hamilton	Noblesville	57.146	91.968		SR 19 north – Peru	Southern terminus of SR 19
Hamilton	Noblesville	58.675	94.428		SR 37 – Fishers, Marion	
Hamilton	Noblesville	60.010	96.577		SR 32 east – Muncie	Eastern end of SR 32 concurrency
Madison	Green Township	66.795	107.496		SR 13 – Fortville, Elwood	
Madison	Pendleton	70.659– 70.810	113.715– 113.958	219	I-69 south – Indianapolis	Southern end of I-69 concurrency
Madison	Anderson	74.528	119.941	222	I-69 north / SR 9 north / SR 67 north – Anderson, Muncie, Fort Wayne	Northern end of I-69, SR 9, and SR 67 concurrences
Madison	Pendleton	77.025	123.960		US 36 east	Northern end of US 36 concurrency
Madison	Pendleton	77.185	124.217		US 36 south / SR 9 south / SR 67 south – Indianapolis, Greenfield	Southern end of US 36, SR 9, and SR 67 concurrences
Madison	Markleville	82.784	133.228		SR 109 – Knightstown, Anderson	
Henry	Harrison Township	93.061	149.767		SR 234 west – McCordsville	Eastern terminus of SR 234
Henry	New Castle	97.021	156.140		SR 3 – Rushville, Muncie	
Henry	New Castle	97.889	157.537		SR 103 south – Lewisville	Western end of SR 103 concurrency
Henry	New Castle	98.005	157.724		SR 103 north	Eastern end of SR 103 concurrency
Wayne	Hagerstown	109.940	176.931		SR 1 – Cambridge, Redkey	
Wayne	Richmond	121.071	194.845		US 35 to I-70 – Richmond	Eastern end of SR 38
1.000 mi = 1.609 km; 1.000 km = 0.621 mi: Concurrency terminus
