= Interstate 465 =

Beltway in Indiana

Interstate 465
- USS Indianapolis Memorial Highway
- I-465 highlighted in red

Route information
- Auxiliary route of I-65
- Maintained by INDOT
- Length: 52.79 mi (84.96 km)
- Existed: 1959 (completed 1970)–present
- NHS: Entire route

Major junctions
- Beltway around Indianapolis
- I-65 near Beech Grove; US 31 near University Heights; I-69 in Indianapolis; I-70 near Plainfield; I-74 in Speedway; I-65 at Eagle Creek Park; US 31 in Carmel; I-69 near Fishers; I-70 near Lawrence; I-74 near Beech Grove

Location
- Country: United States
- State: Indiana
- Counties: Boone, Hamilton, Marion

Highway system
- Interstate Highway System; Main; Auxiliary; Suffixed; Business; Future; Indiana State Highway System; Interstate; US; State; Scenic
← SR 462	→ I-469

Interstate 465 (I-465), also known as the USS Indianapolis Memorial Highway, is the beltway circling Indianapolis, Indiana. It is roughly rectangular in shape and has a perimeter of approximately 53 miles (85 km). It lies almost completely within the boundaries of Marion County, except for two short sections on the north leg in Boone and Hamilton counties. It intersects with I-65, I-69, I-70, and I-74 and provides additional access to I-65 via I-865.

== Route description ==
Former routes of U.S. and state highways that are now defunct or routed on I-465 are shown in gray. The completed extension of I-69 in 2024 (which intersects with the loop just west of route of Indiana 37 on this map) is not shown here.

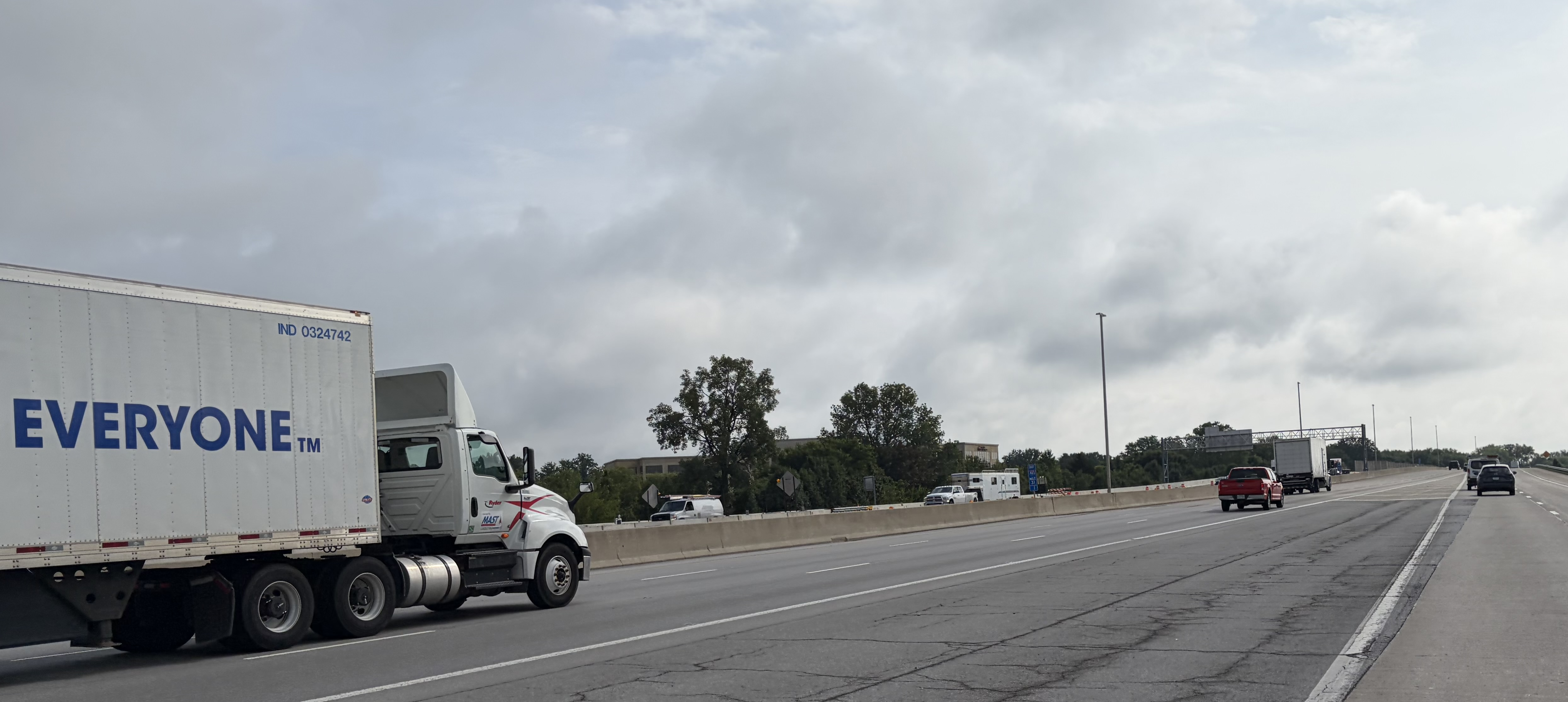
Part of the northern leg of Interstate 465 in Carmel, Indiana

Starting as exit numbers do, I-465 begins at an interchange with I-65 at exit 53, running concurrently with I-69, I-74, US 31, US 36, US 40, SR 37, and SR 67. Moving west, US 31 leaves the Interstate southbound at exit 2. All routes that I-465 meets in this direction (clockwise) move the opposite direction (counterclockwise), except US 52. I-69 and unsigned SR 37 leave the beltway at exit 5 before crossing the White River. Afterwards, at exit 8, SR 67 also exits the loop with Kentucky Avenue. I-465 then meets I-70 at exit 9 near the Indianapolis International Airport. After this interchange, the Interstate then changes direction.

Now northbound, US 40 leaves at exit 12, followed by US 36 at exit 13, towards Plainfield and Avon, respectively. I-74 finally leaves the beltway at exit 16, and US 136 ends just past the interchange. At exit 20, I-465 has a directional access interchange with its parent, I-65. Before the Interstate turns east, at exit 25, I-865 moves west toward I-65 northbound. I-865 eastbound merges into I-465 east, bringing eastbound US 52 with it. As previously mentioned, I-465 then turns east.

Moving eastbound, US 421 meets at exit 27. US 421 northbound exits from westbound I-465, and US 421 southbound enters eastbound. US 31 south also enters the beltway at exit 31. After passing former SR 431 (Keystone Parkway) at exit 33, I-69 southbound enters I-465 in this direction at exit 37. Afterwards, I-465 turns southward.

After the directional change, the Interstate meets Shadeland Avenue, former SR 100, at exit 40. At exit 42, westbound US 36 and southbound SR 67 reenter the beltway. I-70 once again meets I-465 at exit 44. At exit 46, US 40 west reenters the beltway, while US 52 leaves at exit 47. US 421 leaves at exit 49, and I-74 west enters the loop at the same exit. Along with this, I-465 completes its final directional change westbound.

Now moving westbound again, I-465 only has one more interchange (exit 52) before meeting I-65 once again at exit 53, and exit numbers then reset.

All U.S. and state highways that formerly were routed through the central part of Indianapolis are now routed concurrently with I-465. Only I-65 and I-70 run through Downtown Indianapolis.

Non-Interstate Highway route markers are not posted along I-465 itself; rather, signs on the entrance ramps direct traffic traveling a particular route to follow I-465 to a specific exit to continue on that route.

Despite being unsigned, an approximately one-mile (1.6 km) section between exits 46 and 47 carries nine designations: I-465, I-69, US 31, US 36, US 40, US 52, US 421, SR 37 and SR 67, exceeding by one a short segment of Georgia State Route 10 Loop in Athens, Georgia, for the largest concurrency in the United States.

== History ==
=== Planning and alignment selection ===
A beltway for Indianapolis was part of the original plan of the Interstate Highway System in 1955. The general alignment was to be either on or adjacent to the now-defunct SR 100, which, by then, had only two completed legs—on the north side, along 86th Street west of the White River and 82nd Street east of the river, and on the east side, along Shadeland Avenue. On the city's west side, an alignment corridor paralleling High School Road was preferred, and, on the south side, one between Hanna Avenue and Thompson Road had been proposed. Development along 86th Street made its use unfeasible for I-465, so a 91st Street alignment was initially proposed. This proved to be controversial and caused many delays in final alignment selection for the north leg, postponing its construction by several years.

=== Initial construction (1959–1970) ===
The I-465 beltway was constructed in segments. There were 16 segments along the original proposed semicircumferential alignment between I-65 in Boone County at exit 129 and that same highway six miles (9.7 km) to the south at exit 123 in Marion County. Indiana highway officials recognized the value of having the route be a full circumferential, so using non-Interstate federal funding and employing a temporary designation of SR 100, they planned a separate 17th segment northward between I-65 at its exit 123 and the north leg of I-465 in Boone County. By the time that added section was completed in 1970, Indiana had obtained federal approval to sign it as I-465 as well, resulting in the creation of a dogleg section of I-465 outside of the loop (now signed as I-865).

State highway officials concentrated on building the west and south legs of I-465 early in the overall project, since they were the missing portions of the SR 100 concept. Construction began in 1959, and the first section of the I-465 beltway to be completed was the portion on the west leg between I-65 near Eagle Creek Park and I-74/US 136 in Speedway. That section was opened to traffic on September 26, 1961, simultaneously with the adjacent section of I-65 northwest from there running 1.48 miles (2.38 km) to 71st Street. By July 18, 1962, all four segments of the original west leg were open between SR 67 (Kentucky Avenue) and I-65, but the interchange with I-70 in that stretch was not completed until much later that decade when the segment of that route from I-465 west to SR 43 opened in 1968.

The south side sections were the next to be completed, with three opening in the second half of 1963 and two more on October 15, 1964. This completed both the south leg and the first segment of the east leg and included a connection from a point just north of the Raymond Street grade separation to SR 100 (Shadeland Avenue) at Washington Street (US 40). With these sections open, the full length of I-74's concurrency over I-465 was now available for motorists. The south leg's junction with I-65 was also completed, but I-65 itself was open only between a temporary intersection at Thompson Road to the south and the Keystone Avenue interchange 1.18 miles (1.90 km) north of I-465 until early 1971.

With SR 100/Shadeland Avenue connected to the full southern and western bypass of Indianapolis, work on I-465's east leg slowed, delaying the opening of the next segment over three years. In January 1968, two sections of the east leg, between US 36/SR 67 (Pendleton Pike) and the SR 100 junction near Raymond Street, were completed and opened a day apart. This allowed through traffic from both US 36 and SR 67 to bypass the increasingly congested SR 100. The interchange with I-70 in this newly opened section was not yet complete, and its ramps did not open until the opening of that route's mainline between SR 100/Shadeland Avenue and SR 9 near Greenfield on December 2 of that year. On October 23, 1968, the section of I-465 between Pendleton Pike and 56th Street at Shadeland Avenue was finished and opened to traffic, completing the east leg's eastern bypass of SR 100.

With its alignment controversies now settled, the north leg of I-465 began to take shape in the late 1960s. The section between US 421 (Michigan Road) and US 31 (Meridian Street) was the first on this side of town to see traffic on October 20, 1968. A year to the day later, the segment from US 31 to Keystone Avenue (then SR 431) was opened to motorists. The next month, in November 1969, the north extension of the west leg was completed and signed as I-465 (although it was considered to be "added mileage" by the Federal Highway Administration (FHWA) since it was built to Interstate standards using non-Interstate funds by Indiana), but only the portion between I-65 and 86th Street was opened to traffic because the segment of the north leg to which it would connect was not yet complete. That occurred on August 18, 1970, when the western end of the north leg between I-65 near Royalton and Michigan Road (US 421) was finished and opened to traffic. At that time, the final connection on the north extension of the west leg to 86th Street was also opened, leaving only one remaining gap in the entire I-465 route.

The final section of I-465 to be built was the portion joining the north and east legs between Keystone Avenue (then SR 431) and 56th Street at Shadeland Avenue (then SR 100). This stretch opened to traffic on October 5, 1970, and marked the completion of the I-465 beltway around Indianapolis.

=== Subsequent improvements and changes ===
The first of the major post-completion rebuild and expansion projects occurred from 1999 to 2002, when the heavily traveled northern section of the east leg was modernized and expanded to as many as 13 lanes in one short portion. Concurrently, the east junction with I-70 was rebuilt and reconfigured. In 2000, the Emerson Avenue interchange on the south leg was converted from a conventional diamond to a single-point urban interchange (SPUI), becoming the first SPUI on the I-465 beltway.

Between 2004 and 2005, the north extension of I-465's west leg between I-65 and I-865 was rebuilt to widen and update the freeway in this heavily traveled section located along the western edge of the massive Park 100 commercial and industrial development. This segment was rapidly becoming functionally obsolete due to continued growth of that complex as well as that of other nearby residential and commercial projects in Pike Township. Both interchanges along this stretch, 71st Street (exit 21) and 86th Street (exit 23), were totally rebuilt while remaining open to traffic and had loop ramps added for west-to-south movements. In addition, a new northbound exit ramp was added at exit 21 which bridges over 71st Street to directly deposit motorists onto eastbound 73rd Street. On the mainline, dual auxiliary lanes were added in each travel direction between these interchanges and the 79th Street grade separation over I-465 was demolished and rebuilt to allow for the widened freeway below. Distinctive decorative features were also incorporated into most of the grade separation structures within this project. Also, bicycle paths were established along the southern side of both 86th and 71st streets, which included grade separations with the east-to-south ramps at both interchanges.

In April 2002, the Indiana Department of Transportation (INDOT) announced the redesignation of the dogleg portion of I-465 as I-865. This change eliminated the three-way intersection of I-465 where the north extension of the west leg met the original north leg (at exit 25).

INDOT completed an $800-million (equivalent to $1.08 billion in 2024) project called Accelerate 465 to refurbish and reconfigure the original west leg of the loop between July 2007 and December 2012. This project completely rebuilt and added new travel lanes, added auxiliary lanes, rebuilt many grade separations, and reconfigured nearly all of the interchanges along I-465 from just north of the Kentucky Avenue (SR 67 south) interchange to the 56th Street partial interchange. The junction with I-74 and Crawfordsville Road (US 136 west) was reconfigured to allow direct access between I-465 and US 136 for the first time. Interlaced into that design is a full directional connection for I-74, which replaced the former cloverleaf interchange and removed its original stub connector east of I-465 to the intersection of Crawfordsville Road and High School Road in Speedway.

Also in 2007, another undertaking was launched by INDOT to modernize the entire northeastern portion of I-465. All three interchanges along the freeway in this stretch—Keystone Avenue (exit 33), Allisonville Road (exit 35) and I-69/Binford Boulevard (exit 37)—were to be modified and rebuilt. As this project progressed, financial constraints prompted INDOT to scale back its scope. The reconstruction of I-465 between the White River bridge and Fall Creek, including the interchange with I-69, began in 2022 under a separate project announced in 2015 and formally relaunched as "Clear Path 465" in 2017. The original, scaled-back project concluded by the end of 2012. The beltway's mainline was reconstructed with additional travel and auxiliary lanes being added in two separate segments—from east of Meridian Street to Allisonville Road and from a point at the southeast end of the I-69/Binford interchange southward to Fall Creek.

The Keystone Avenue partial cloverleaf interchange was reconfigured to allow free-flowing access for most of the movements between I-465 and Keystone. Although Keystone operates as a controlled-access highway both north of I-465 and up to the first junction south of the Interstate, the movements from westbound I-465 to southbound Keystone and from eastbound I-465 to northbound Keystone are not free-flowing but are left turns controlled by traffic lights.

At Allisonville Road, the interchange was converted into a more efficient SPUI configuration. Finally, though the interchange itself was not rebuilt, the I-69/Binford Boulevard junction had two ramps slightly modified to facilitate better traffic flow.

As part of the major project to upgrade 13 miles (21 km) of US 31 in Hamilton County to a full Interstate-standard freeway, the I-465 north leg interchange at Meridian Street (exit 31) was reconfigured between October 2013 and December 2015 (with some additional work continuing until November 22, 2016) to the present partial directional (system interchange) design which allows for free-flow movements to or from the new US 31 freeway to the north.

As part of its Operation Indy Commute project, INDOT began work in 2013 to widen I-65 on both its northbound and southbound mainlines from exit 103 at Southport Road northward to the junction with I-465's south leg, which would also be modified. To reduce congestion at and near that interchange, the loop ramp from westbound I-465 to southbound I-65 was replaced by a flyover ramp. The eastbound I-465 exit to southbound I-65 was also expanded for smoother merging with the new west-to-south flyover. In addition, grade separations over I-465 were replaced on Sherman Drive and Carson Avenue to allow for longer and wider approaches to this busy junction. Most of this work was completed in late 2014.

In 2022, construction began on Clear Path 465, a project involving widening I-465 between the White River and Fall Creek, as well as rebuilding the interchange of I-465 and I-69 in the northeast region of Indianapolis. As part of this project, the interchange will be reconfigured to provide a direct movement for traffic on I-69 to continue onto I-465 southbound, which will be concurrent with I-69 upon the interstate's completion.

On August 6 and 9, 2024, the interchange between I-69 and I-465 on the southwest side of Indianapolis (exit 5) officially opened to traffic, with I-69 running concurrently with I-465 on the southeast half of the beltway between exits 5 and 37. With the portion between exits 5 and 49 also including part of the existing concurrency of I-465 and I-74, this created another instance of a three-route concurrency within the Interstate Highway System, the other two (both in Wisconsin) being in Milwaukee and between Madison and Portage.

=== Memorial designation ===
Indianapolis native David Letterman had quintuple bypass surgery in 2000, and, two years later, suggested on his show that I-465 should be renamed the David Letterman Bypass, going so far as to call the mayor of Indianapolis during the Late Show with David Letterman. At the time of the gag on his show, Letterman had offered $10 million (equivalent to $16.6 million in 2024) for the honor, later offering just to pay to change the signs.

In 2011, the Indiana General Assembly passed a resolution officially designating I-465 as "USS Indianapolis Memorial Highway" in "the memory of the brave sailors who lost their lives" when USS Indianapolis was sunk in the Pacific during World War II. Signs for this designation have been erected sporadically around the loop, but the highway is still referred to nearly exclusively as "I-465" or simply "465" by most locals.

== Future ==
Remaining sections of the I-465 beltway that are still awaiting reconstruction or widening projects include the west leg junction with I-65, the north leg between I-865 and US 31 north/Meridian Street, and several portions along the southeast leg.

== Exit list ==
County	Location	mi	km	Exit	Destinations	Notes
Marion	Indianapolis	0.00	0.00	53	I-65 – Indianapolis, Louisville	I-65 exit 106; signed as exits 53A (north) & 53B (south)
Marion	Indianapolis	2.20	3.54	2	US 31 south (East Street)	Southern end of US 31 concurrency; signed as exits 2A (north) and 2B (south)
Marion	Indianapolis	4.30	6.92	4	Harding Street	
Marion	Indianapolis	5.25	8.45	5	I-69 south – Evansville	Interchange opened on August 6 and 9, 2024; southern end of I-69 concurrency; I-69 exit 163
Marion	Indianapolis	7.33	11.80	7	Mann Road	Westbound exit and eastbound entrance
Marion	Indianapolis	8.51	13.70	8	SR 67 south (Kentucky Avenue)	Southern end of SR 67 concurrency; cardinal direction change: westbound becomes northbound, southbound becomes eastbound
Marion	Indianapolis	9.32	15.00	9	I-70 – Indianapolis, Indianapolis International Airport, St. Louis	Signed as exits 9A (east) and 9B (west); exit 73 on I-70 westbound, exit 69 on I-70 eastbound
Marion	Indianapolis	10.48	16.87	11	Sam Jones Expressway	
Marion	Indianapolis	11.77	18.94	12	US 40 west (Washington Street)	Western end of US 40 concurrency
Marion	Indianapolis	12.91	20.78	13	US 36 west (Rockville Road)	Western end of US 36 concurrency
Marion	Indianapolis	13.95	22.45	14	10th Street	
Marion	Speedway	15.55– 15.77	25.03– 25.38	16	I-74 west – Peoria US 136 west (Crawfordsville Road)	Western end of I-74 concurrency; eastern terminus of US 136; signed as exits 16A (US 136) and 16B (I-74)
Marion	Indianapolis	17.02	27.39	17	38th Street	Partial cloverleaf interchange
Marion	Indianapolis	19.03	30.63	19	56th Street	Northbound exit and southbound entrance
Marion	Indianapolis	19.80	31.87	20	I-65 – Indianapolis, Chicago	I-65 exit 123; directional access (northbound to northbound and southbound to southbound) only
Marion	Indianapolis	20.82– 21.45	33.51– 34.52	21	71st Street, 73rd Street	Exit to 73rd Street northbound only
Marion	Indianapolis	23.15	37.26	23	86th Street	
Boone	Zionsville	24.26– 24.63	39.04– 39.64	25	I-865 west / US 52 west to I-65 north – Chicago	Western end of US 52 concurrency; eastern terminus of I-865 (exit 5); cardinal direction change: northbound becomes eastbound, westbound becomes southbound
Marion	Indianapolis	26.42	42.52	27	US 421 north (Michigan Road)	Northern end of US 421 concurrency
Hamilton	Carmel	30.27	48.71	31	US 31 north – Westfield, Kokomo; Meridian Street south	Northern end of US 31 concurrency
Marion	Indianapolis	32.87	52.90	33	Keystone Avenue	Partial cloverleaf interchange; former SR 431
Marion	Indianapolis	34.94	56.23	35	Allisonville Road	Single-point diamond interchange
Marion	Indianapolis	36.50	58.74	37A	I-69 north – Fort Wayne; Binford Boulevard	Northern end of I-69 concurrency; signed northbound as exit 37; no access from northbound I-465 to southbound Binford Boulevard or northbound Binford Boulevard to southbound I-465; I-69 south exit 200;cardinal direction change: eastbound becomes southbound, northbound becomes westbound
Marion	Indianapolis			37B	82nd Street	
Marion	Indianapolis	38.83	62.49	40	56th Street; Shadeland Avenue	Full access to and from 56th Street; directional access (northbound to northbound and southbound to southbound) only for Shadeland Avenue (former SR 100)
Marion	Lawrence	41.05	66.06	42	US 36 east / SR 67 north (Pendleton Pike)	Eastern/northern end of US 36 / SR 67 concurrency
Marion	Indianapolis	43.43	69.89	44	I-70 – Indianapolis, Dayton	I-70 eastbound exit 89, westbound exit 90; signed northbound as exits 44A (east) & 44B (west)
Marion	Indianapolis	45.27	72.86	46	US 40 east (Washington Street)	Eastern end of US 40 concurrency
Marion	Indianapolis	46.81	75.33	47	US 52 east (Brookville Road)	Eastern end of US 52 concurrency
Marion	Indianapolis	47.27	76.07	48	Shadeland Avenue	Northbound exit and southbound entrance; former SR 100
Marion	Indianapolis	48.33	77.78	49	I-74 east / US 421 south – Cincinnati; Southeastern Avenue	Eastern/southern end of I-74 / US 421 concurrency; cardinal direction change: southbound becomes westbound, eastbound becomes northbound
Marion	Beech Grove	51.40	82.72	52	Emerson Avenue	Single-point diamond interchange
Marion	Indianapolis	52.79	84.96	53	I-65 – Indianapolis, Louisville	I-65 exit 106; signed as exits 53A (north) & 53B (south)
1.000 mi = 1.609 km; 1.000 km = 0.621 mi: Concurrency terminus; Incomplete access; Unopened
