= Airport Parkway =

Airport Parkway may refer to:

== Railway stations ==
- Luton Airport Parkway railway station
- Southampton Airport Parkway railway station

== Roads ==
=== Canada ===
- Airport Parkway (Ottawa), in Ottawa, Ontario, Canada

=== United States ===
- Airport Parkway (Mississippi)
- Bryan Boulevard in Greensboro, North Carolina, formerly known as Airport Parkway
- Airport Parkway near Pittsburgh comprises two routes:
  - Interstate 376 Business between University Boulevard and its eastern terminus
  - Interstate 376 between exit 57 and exit 60
- Tennessee State Route 357

== See also ==
- Airport Expressway
