= Sam H. Jones Sr. =

American civil rights leader

- Born: March 3, 1928; Heidelburg, Mississippi
- Died: March 26, 2003 (aged 75); Indianapolis, IN
- Resting place: Crown Hill Cemetery and Arboretum; 39.8174209°N 86.1695842°W

Sam Henry Jones Sr. (March 3, 1928 – March 26, 2003) was a civil rights leader and the first President of the Indianapolis Urban League. Under his leadership, the organization aimed to uplift the African American community in Indianapolis through social, economic, and philanthropic programs.

== Early life and education ==
Jones was born in Heidelberg, Mississippi, on March 3, 1928. He attended Clark College and earned his Bachelor of Arts degree in 1950. He later attended Atlanta University and earned a Master of Arts in Sociology in 1954 and a Master of Social Work in 1956. He married his wife, Prethenia, and together they had a daughter and two sons: Marya, Sam Jr., and Michael.

== Career ==
In 1955, he started his career at the Cleveland Urban League, serving as the Industrial Relations Secretary and Director of Vocational Education. He served at the Pontiac, Michigan Urban League from 1961 to 1963 as the Executive Director and later served at the St. Paul, Minnesota Urban League from 1963 to 1966. In 1966, Jones accepted the role of Executive Director of the newly chartered Indianapolis Urban League.

== Community involvement and activism ==
Jones had a strong connection to the community and was devoted to civic leadership. He was a member of the NAACP, the concerned Clergy of Indianapolis, board of Methodist Hospital, the Metropolitan Board of Missions of the United Methodist Church, and the Boy Scouts Council to name a few. Jones was an active Methodist layman. In May 1970, he was awarded doctor of humane letters degree by Marion College. the following year, the National Conference of Christians and Jews honored him as a recipient of the brotherhood award.

In 1976, Mayor William H. Hudnut III, declared in a proclamation that November 24 would be observed as "Sam H. Jones Day". The Airport Expressway was renamed to Sam Jones Expressway by Mayor Bart Peterson in honor of Jones and his legacy.

Jones was a Sublime Prince of the Scottish Rite Masons of Indiana. He received this thirty-third and last degree of Masonry in May 1988.

In 2005, The Urban League unveiled a portrait of Jones in his honor.
