= Interstate 70 in Indiana =

Interstate highway in Indiana

Interstate 70
- I-70 highlighted in red

Route information
- Maintained by INDOT
- Length: 156.60 mi (252.02 km)
- Existed: 1956 (completed in 1992)–present
- NHS: Entire route

Major junctions
- West end: I-70 / US 40 at the Illinois state line near West Terre Haute
- US 41 / US 150 in Terre Haute; US 231 in Cloverdale; I-74 / I-465 in Indianapolis; I-65 in Indianapolis; I-69 / I-465 in Indianapolis; US 27 in Richmond
- East end: I-70 / US 35 at the Ohio state line in Richmond

Location
- Country: United States
- State: Indiana
- Counties: Vigo, Clay, Putnam, Morgan, Hendricks, Marion, Hancock, Henry, Wayne

Highway system
- Interstate Highway System; Main; Auxiliary; Suffixed; Business; Future; Indiana State Highway System; Interstate; US; State; Scenic
← SR 69	→ SR 70

Interstate 70 (I-70) in the US state of Indiana travels east–west across the central portion of the state, passing through the capital of Indianapolis. I-70 crosses from Illinois into Indiana near Terre Haute and departs into Ohio at Richmond. It covers 156.6 miles (252.0 km) in Indiana, paralleling U.S. Highway 40 (US 40), the old National Road (except for the first approximately 11 miles (18 km) in which the two routes overlap).

== Route description ==
The Indiana portion of I-70 begins at the Illinois state line west of Terre Haute. Heading east, I-70 crosses the Wabash River soon after entering the state. The Interstate crosses through the south side of Terre Haute, where it has an interchange with US 41/US 150. Just outside the city to the east, I-70 passes near Terre Haute Regional Airport, where US 40 leaves the Interstate before continuing onward to the east-northeast through rural lands toward Indianapolis. This stretch of I-70 does not have any interchanges with any significant cities until it reaches the Indianapolis metropolitan area, but it does pass within proximity of Greencastle.

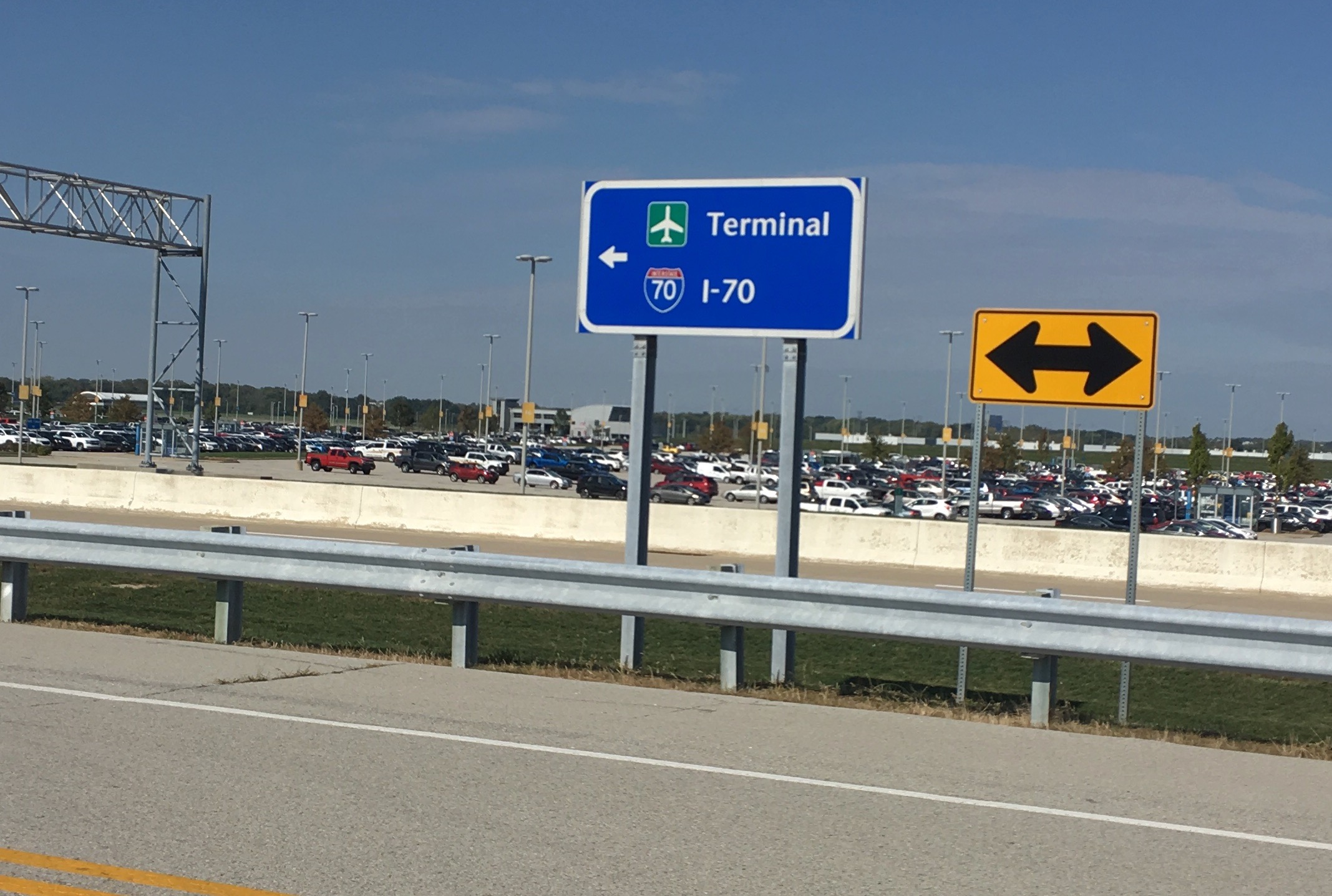
I-70 sign outside of Indianapolis International Airport

Entering the Indianapolis area, I-70 passes through the southern reaches of Plainfield in Hendricks County, home to many logistics and warehousing companies. Shortly thereafter, it enters Marion County and the city of Indianapolis, passing just to the south of the Indianapolis International Airport, where the freeway now serves as the passenger terminal's main vehicular access point. At the far southeast corner of the airport, I-70 has an interchange with the I-465 circumferential for the first of two times at exit 73; however, motorists heading to the west or south legs of I-465 (or to the concurrent I-74) from eastbound I-70 must exit onto a parallel collector–distributor roadway nearly four miles (6.4 km) prior (at exit 69) to reaching the actual crossing of the beltway. Once beyond the airport, I-70 curves first to the northeast, then to the east, before eventually crossing the White River and passing just to the south of Lucas Oil Stadium, Downtown Indianapolis, and the corporate headquarters campus of pharmaceutical giant Eli Lilly and Company before reaching I-65.

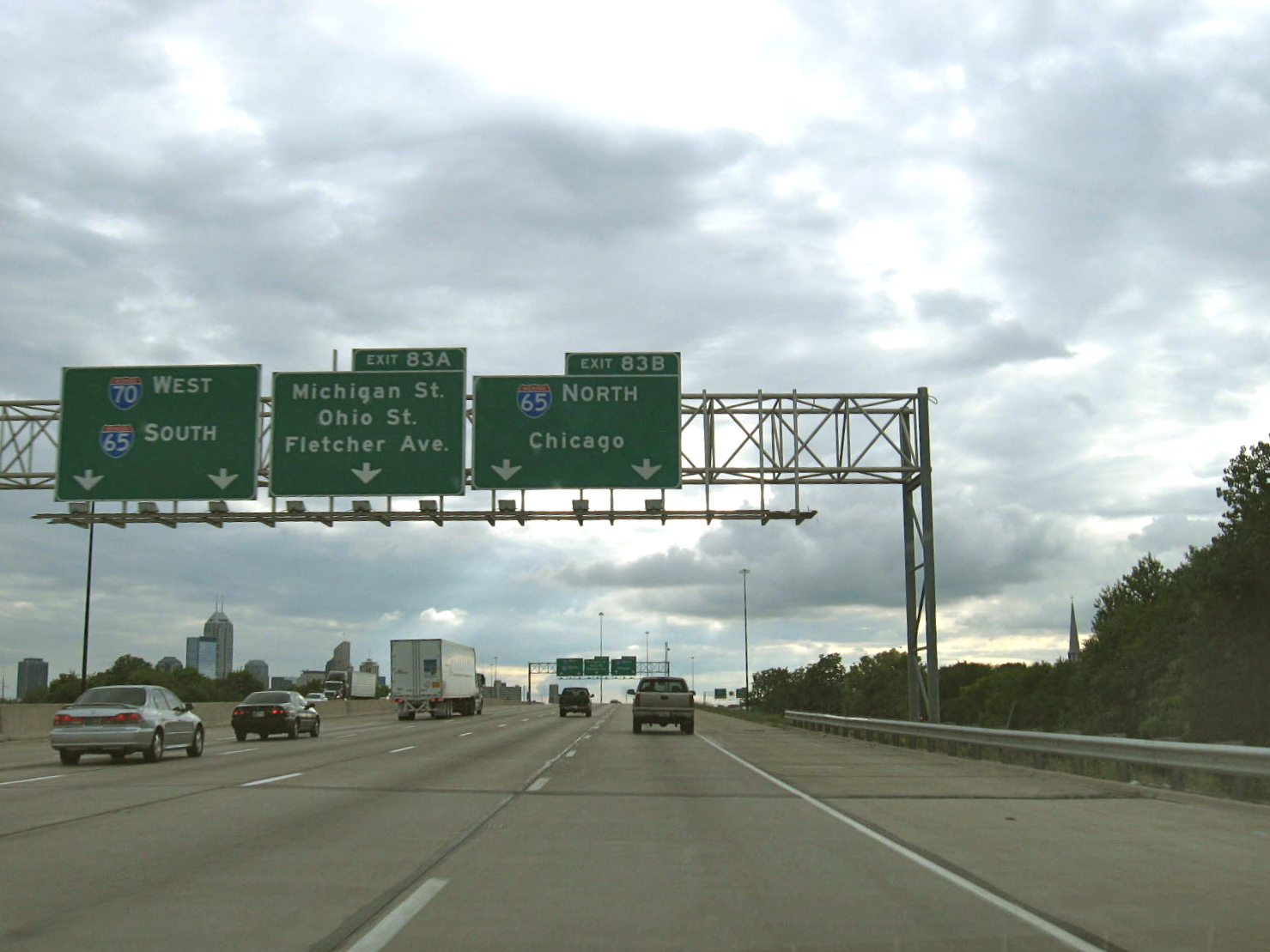
Westbound sign for the north split between I-65 and I-70

Turning north, the next section of I-70 along the east side of Downtown Indianapolis travels concurrent with I-65. The two major interchanges at either end of this concurrency are often referred to as the "North Split" and the "South Split", forming the eastern leg of a section of freeways and surface streets locally known as the "Inner Loop" (around the Indianapolis central business district as opposed to the "Outer Loop" of the I-465 beltway). The north split is also called the "Spaghetti Bowl" due to the visual complexity of the overlapping freeways, ghost ramps, and overpasses that were originally intended as a connection to a never-built portion of I-69. Access to I-69 requires continuing on I-70 east to Exit 89 (Exit 90 westbound). The "North Split" was closed for reconstruction in early 2021 and reopened to traffic in late 2022. As part of that reconstruction, the old ramps were replaced with ones that eliminated the lane switching that drivers originally had to perform to stay on I-70 eastbound and I-65 northbound.

Upon leaving I-65 at the north split, I-70 reaches a maximum width of 10 lanes (five in each direction) as it departs Downtown Indianapolis toward the east-northeast. On the east side of the city, I-70 again intersects with the I-465 beltway (also concurrent here with Interstate 69) at another complex interchange before departing the city, county, and metro area in a nearly due-east direction toward Ohio.

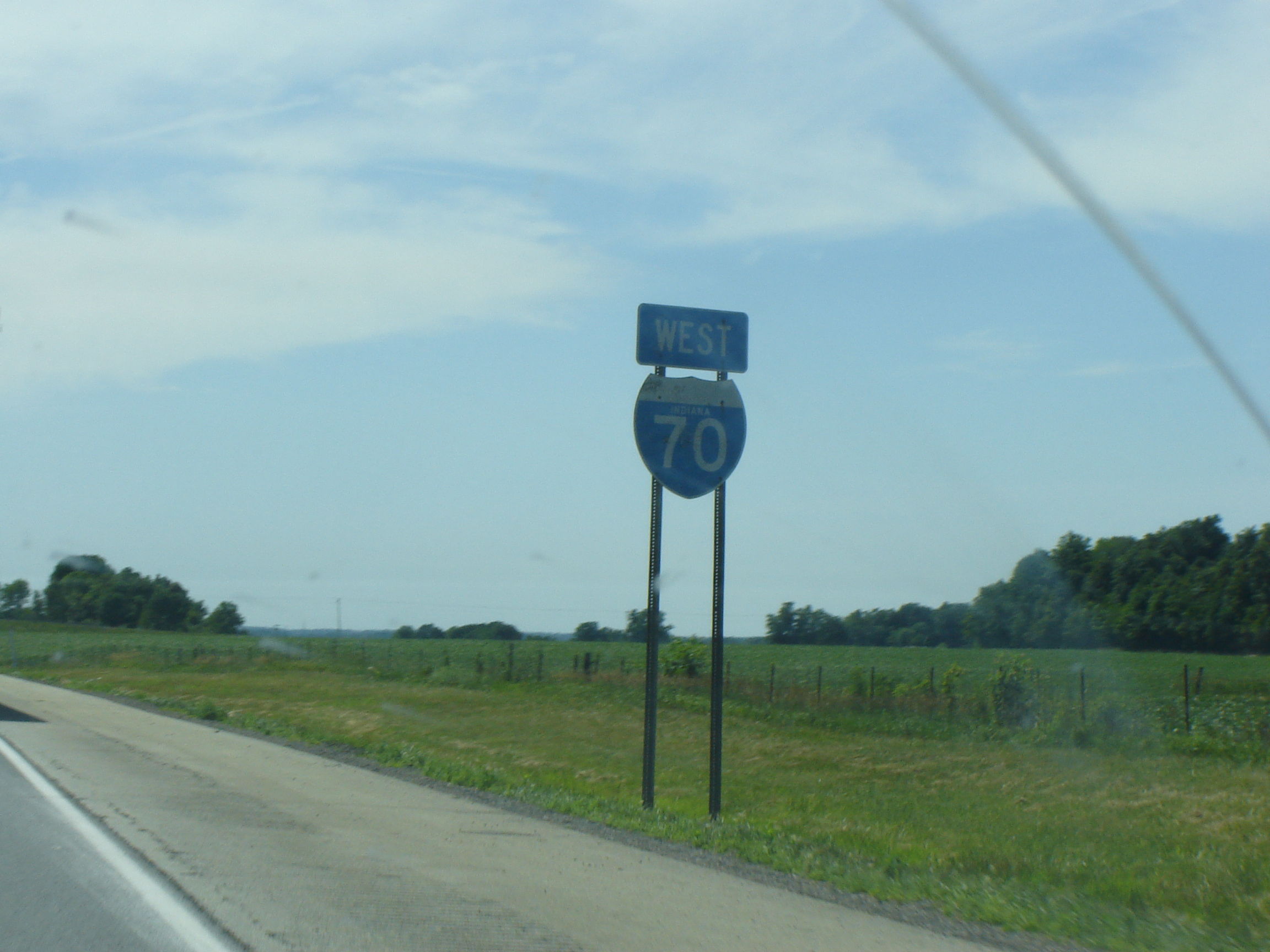
I-70 shield near Richmond

The portion of I-70 east of Indianapolis has been designated as the "Anton Tony Hulman, Jr. Memorial Way". Tony Hulman is most known for rescuing the Indianapolis Motor Speedway in 1945 and making the Indianapolis 500 popular. This stretch of I-70 does not have any interchanges with any significant cities until it reaches Richmond, but it does pass within proximity of both Greenfield and New Castle. On the northwest side of Richmond, US 35 joins I-70 and remains on the freeway as both routes jointly cross into Ohio. It also has a single-point urban interchange with US 27 providing access to Richmond south of the Interstate. On the east side of Richmond, US 40 intersects with I-70 immediately to the west of the Ohio state line.

The bridge carrying US 27 over I-70 immediately north of Richmond is named the "Officer Seara Burton Memorial Bridge", in honor of a Richmond police officer and K-9 handler who was shot by the subject of a traffic stop on August 10, 2022, and died on September 18.

== History ==
=== Initial construction ===
Like all Interstate Highways in Indiana, I-70 was constructed in segments which, when all were complete, make up the route as it is today. There were three large segments in the western portion of the route between the Illinois border and I-465 in Indianapolis, and five more in the eastern portion connecting the east side of Indianapolis to Ohio. The urban portions through the capital city itself within I-465 were mostly deferred until the end of the Interstate construction process in the early to mid-1970s.

The first section of I-70 to be built in Indiana was the portion around Richmond east of the Centerville exit, which opened to traffic on September 17, 1961. The final portion outside I-465 to be completed was the middle of the three western segments, located between State Road 46 (SR 46) near Terre Haute and SR 59, which opened on October 20, 1969. Within I-465, the short section between Shadeland Avenue (then SR 100) and the I-465 interchange had opened along with the rest of I-70 from that point east to SR 9 near Greenfield on December 2, 1968. Another section of I-70 on the southwest side of Indianapolis between the I-465 beltway and Holt Road had been completed and opened by December 10, 1969. But the remainder of the I-70 mileage through the heart of the city was not finished and open to traffic until October 1976.

=== Subsequent improvements ===
Between 2003 and 2005, I-70 was rebuilt about 1,000 feet (300 m) south of its original alignment on the western edge of Indianapolis. This reconstruction was done to allow expansion of runways at Indianapolis International Airport and to facilitate development of access roads from I-70 to the site of the new midfield Col. H. Weir Cook Passenger Terminal Building (which opened in 2008) at the airport.

== Exit list ==
County	Location	mi	km	Exit	Destinations	Notes
Vigo	Sugar Creek Township	0.00	0.00		I-70 west / US 40 west – Effingham, St. Louis	Illinois state line
Vigo	Sugar Creek Township	1.07	1.72	1	National Road – West Terre Haute, Terre Haute	Eastbound exit and westbound entrance
Vigo	Sugar Creek Township	3.40	5.47	3	Darwin Road – West Terre Haute	
Vigo	Terre Haute	6.84	11.01	7	US 41 / US 150 – Terre Haute, Evansville	
Vigo	Terre Haute	11.18	17.99	11	US 40 east / SR 46 east / SR 641 south – Terre Haute International Airport, Rose Hulman Institute of Technology	Eastern end of US 40 concurrency; western terminus of SR 46
Clay	Posey–Jackson township line	22.57	36.32	23	SR 59 – Brazil, Linton	
Putnam	Cloverdale Township	37.09	59.69	37	SR 243 – Putnamville	
Putnam	Cloverdale	41.11	66.16	41	US 231 – Cloverdale, Greencastle	
Morgan	Adams Township	50.65	81.51	51	County Road 1100 West	
Hendricks	Liberty Township	59.21	95.29	59	SR 39 – Belleville, Monrovia	
Morgan	No major junctions					
Hendricks	Plainfield	66.22	106.57	66	Quaker Boulevard - Plainfield, Mooresville	Former SR 267
Hendricks	Plainfield	68.32	109.95	68	Ameriplex Parkway / Ronald Reagan Parkway – Indianapolis International Airport	Signed as exits 68A (south) and 68B (north) eastbound; airport access via Col. H. Weir Cook Memorial Drive (unsigned)
Marion	Indianapolis	72.75	117.08	69 73	I-465 / I-74 / US 36 / US 40 – Peoria, Cincinnati	Signed as exit 69 eastbound and exits 73A (east/south) and 73B (west/north) westbound; exits 68 and 69 are connected to each other via collector/distributor lanes; I-465 exit 9
Marion	Indianapolis	74.53	119.94	75	Sam Jones Expressway to Raymond Street	Directional access (eastbound to eastbound and westbound to westbound) only; Raymond Street signed eastbound only
Marion	Indianapolis	76.38	122.92	77	Holt Road	
Marion	Indianapolis	78.42	126.20	78	Harding Street	
Marion	Indianapolis	79.47	127.89	79A	West Street	Split diamond interchange for West Street (one way south) and Missouri Street (one way north)
Marion	Indianapolis	80.01	128.76	79B	Illinois Street, McCarty Street	Eastbound exit and westbound entrance only to Illinois Street; complete access to McCarty Street
Marion	Indianapolis	80.72	129.91	80	I-65 south – Louisville	Western end of I-65 concurrency; I-65 exit 110B
Marion	Indianapolis	80.77	129.99	110A	East Street	Exit number follows I-65; westbound exit only
Marion	Indianapolis	81.51	131.18	111	Washington Street	Exit number follows I-65; eastbound exit and westbound entrance (to collector/distributor)
Marion	Indianapolis			—	I-65 north – Chicago	Eastern end of I-65 concurrency; eastbound exit and westbound left entrance; I-65 exit 112
Marion	Indianapolis	81.01– 81.78	130.37– 131.61	83A	Michigan Street / Ohio Street / Fletcher Avenue	Westbound exit and eastbound entrance (via collector/distributor lanes)
Marion	Indianapolis	82.20	132.29	83B	I-65 north – Chicago	Westbound exit and eastbound left entrance; I-65 exit 112
Marion	Indianapolis	84.33	135.72	85	Rural Street south / Keystone Avenue north	Signed as exits 85A (south) and 85B (north)
Marion	Indianapolis	86.20	138.73	87	Emerson Avenue	
Marion	Indianapolis	88.47	142.38	89	Shadeland Avenue	Connected to I-465 exit eastbound via collector-distributor lanes
Marion	Indianapolis	89.04	143.30	90	I-69 / I-465 (US 31 / US 36 / US 52 / US 421 / SR 67) – Evansville, Fort Wayne	Signed as exit 89 eastbound due to shared collector-distributor lanes
Marion	Indianapolis	90.38	145.45	91	Post Road	
Hancock	Mount Comfort	95.61	153.87	96	Mount Comfort Road	
Hancock	Greenfield			100	CR 200 West	Future interchange to be opened in 2031
Hancock	Greenfield	103.31	166.26	104	SR 9 – Maxwell, Greenfield	
Henry	Wayne Township	114.93	184.96	115	SR 109 – Wilkinson, Knightstown	
Henry	Spiceland–Franklin township line	122.68	197.43	123	SR 3 – New Castle, Spiceland	
Henry	Dudley Township	130.62	210.21	131	Wilbur Wright Road	
Wayne	Jackson–Harrison township line	136.92	220.35	137	SR 1 – Hagerstown, Connersville, Cambridge City	
Wayne	Center Township	144.88	233.16	145	Centerville Road	
Wayne	Richmond	148.64– 148.74	239.21– 239.37	149	US 35 north to SR 38 – Muncie	Signed as exits 149A (east/south) and 149B (west/north); western end of US 35 concurrency; hybrid cloverleaf interchange, northbound Williamsburg Pike to I-70 west is a left-exit flyover
Wayne	Richmond	150.67	242.48	151	US 27 (Chester Boulevard) – Winchester	Single-point urban interchange
Wayne	Richmond	152.24	245.01	153	SR 227 to SR 121 – Union City	
Wayne	Richmond	155.56	250.35	156A	US 40 west (National Road)	
Wayne	Richmond	155.56	250.35	156B	US 40 east – Lewisburg	Westbound exit leads to, and eastbound entrance comes from, Ohio
Wayne	Richmond	156.60	252.02		I-70 east / US 35 east – Dayton, Columbus	Ohio state line
1.000 mi = 1.609 km; 1.000 km = 0.621 mi: Concurrency terminus; Incomplete access; Unopened

Interstate 70
Previous state: Illinois	Indiana	Next state: Ohio
