= Interstate 74 in Indiana =

Section of interstate highway in Indiana, United States

Interstate 74
- I-74 highlighted in red

Route information
- Maintained by INDOT
- Length: 171.54 mi (276.07 km)
- Existed: 1960–present
- NHS: Entire route

Major junctions
- West end: I-74 at the Illinois state line in Danville
- SR 63 near Covington; US 231 in Crawfordsville; SR 32 in Crawfordsville; SR 267 in Brownsburg; I-65 / I-69 / I-70 / I-465 / US 421 in Indianapolis; SR 9 / SR 44 in Shelbyville; US 421 in Greensburg; SR 229 in Batesville; SR 1 in Saint Leon; US 52 near Braysville
- East end: I-74 / US 52 at the Ohio state line in Harrison

Location
- Country: United States
- State: Indiana
- Counties: Vermillion, Fountain, Montgomery, Boone, Hendricks, Marion, Shelby, Rush, Decatur, Franklin, Ripley, Dearborn

Highway system
- Interstate Highway System; Main; Auxiliary; Suffixed; Business; Future; Indiana State Highway System; Interstate; US; State; Scenic
← SR 71	→ SR 75

Interstate 74 (I-74) in the US state of Indiana traverses central parts of the state from west to east. It connects Champaign, Illinois, with Indianapolis in the center of the state, and Indianapolis with Cincinnati, Ohio. I-74 covers 171.54 miles (276.07 km) across Indiana, a portion of which is concurrently routed through Indianapolis along the southern and western legs of I-465.

== Route description ==
I-74 crosses the Indiana–Illinois state line between Danville, Vermilion County, Illinois, and Highland Township, Vermillion County, Indiana. The Interstate retains its configuration as a four-lane freeway, and passes by an eastbound rest area just east of the state line. I-74 continues to head due east through a mix of rural woodland and farmland before it reaches a modified diamond interchange with State Road 63 (SR 63), which provides access to both the town of Newport, the county seat of Vermillion County, and the city of Terre Haute, the county seat of neighboring Vigo County, to the south.

East of SR 63, the freeway descends slightly to cross the Wabash River, where it leaves Vermillion County and crosses into Troy Township, Fountain County. I-74 ascends from river crossing and comes to a diamond interchange with South Stringtown Road, which provides access to the city of Covington to the north. I-74 continues east, passing over U.S. Highway 136 (US 136) and intersecting US 41 at Veedersburg about 15 miles (24 km) east of the Illinois border. The Interstate intersects US 231 19 miles (31 km) later, providing access to Crawfordsville to the south. I-74 runs nearly parallel to US 136 from the Illinois border until US 136 terminates at I-465.

When I-74 reaches Indianapolis, it continues south, running concurrently with I-465 on the latter's western and southern segments. (The exits of this concurrency are numbered as if it were part of I-465 only.) I-74 is also concurrent with I-69, US 31, US 36, US 40, US 52, and SR 67, for varying lengths of its route around Indianapolis. I-74 crosses the White River and passes by the Indianapolis International Airport on the southwest side of Indianapolis. Once I-74 reaches the southeast side of Indianapolis, it diverges from I-69 and I-465 and continues to the southeast. At this interchange, I-74 picks up US 421, with which it will run concurrently.

Outside of the Indianapolis area, I-74 continues southeast and runs past Shelbyville. Near the halfway point between Indianapolis and the Ohio border, I-74 runs through Greensburg. US 421 diverges and runs south through Greensburg. Continuing on east, I-74 runs parallel to SR 46. Just west of the Ohio border, I-74 crosses the Whitewater River. It also intersects with and begins a concurrency with US 52. The two roads then cross into Ohio at Harrison.

== History ==
=== Initial construction ===
Like all Interstate Highways in Indiana, I-74 was constructed in segments. There were six segments in the western portion of the route between the Illinois state line and I-465 in Speedway, and six more in the eastern portion connecting I-465 near Beech Grove to the Ohio state line. The concurrent portions around Indianapolis on I-465, consisting of seven separate sections along the west and south legs of that beltway, became operational between December 21, 1961, and October 15, 1964. The eastern segments connecting Indianapolis and Cincinnati were also given a relatively high priority and were all completed and open by October 30, 1964.

The first section of I-74 to be built in Indiana was the portion from the Illinois state line east for just under eight miles (13 km) to the Covington exit just beyond the Wabash River, which opened to traffic in December 1960. The final 13.5-mile (21.7 km) segment, located in Fountain and Montgomery counties on the western portion of the route, was finished and opened on August 31, 1967, marking the full completion of I-74 in the state.

== Exit list ==
County	Location	mi	km	Exit	Destinations	Notes
Indiana–Illinois line		0.00	0.00		I-74 west – Peoria	Continuation into Illinois
Indiana–Illinois line		0.00	0.00	220	Lynch Road	Eastbound entrance extends into Indiana; exit number follows Illinois mileage
Vermillion	Highland Township	4.23	6.81	4	SR 63 – Newport, Terre Haute, Chicago	
Fountain	Covington	8.01	12.89	8	Stringtown Road – Covington	
Fountain	Veedersburg	15.45	24.86	15	US 41 – Veedersburg, Attica, Chicago	
Montgomery	Wayne Township	24.88	40.04	25	SR 25 – Waynetown, Wingate	
Montgomery	Crawfordsville	33.81	54.41	34	US 231 – Linden, Crawfordsville	
Montgomery	Crawfordsville	39.27	63.20	39	SR 32 – Lebanon, Crawfordsville	
Boone	Jamestown	51.95	83.61	52	SR 75 – Jamestown, Advance	
Hendricks	Lizton	57.54	92.60	58	SR 39 – Lizton, Lebanon	
Hendricks	Middle Township	61.21	98.51	61	Jeff Gordon Boulevard – Pittsboro	
Hendricks	Brownsburg	65.82	105.93	66	SR 267 north (Green Street) – Brownsburg	
Hendricks	Brownsburg	68.78	110.69	68	Ronald Reagan Parkway – Brownsburg, Clermont	
Marion	Indianapolis	73.19	117.79	73	I-465 north / US 136 west (Crawfordsville Road)	West end of I-465 overlap; signed as I-465 north only westbound; I-465 exit 16B
Marion	Indianapolis	73.19	117.79	16A	US 136 west (Crawfordsville Road)	Exit numbers follow I-465; no exit number eastbound
Marion	Indianapolis	75.01	120.72	14	10th Street	
Marion	Indianapolis	76.05	122.39	13	US 36 west (Rockville Road)	West end of US 36 overlap
Marion	Indianapolis	77.19	124.23	12	US 40 west (Washington Street)	West end of US 40 overlap
Marion	Indianapolis	78.49	126.32	11	Sam Jones Expressway	
Marion	Indianapolis	79.64	128.17	9	I-70 – Indianapolis, Indianapolis International Airport, St. Louis	Signed as exits 9A (east) and 9B (west) eastbound
Marion	Indianapolis	80.45	129.47	8	SR 67 south (Kentucky Avenue)	West end of SR 67 overlap
Marion	Indianapolis	81.63	131.37	7	Mann Road	Westbound exit and eastbound entrance
Marion	Indianapolis			5	I-69 south – Evansville	Interchange opened on August 6 and 9, 2024, west end of I-69 overlap; I-69 Exit 163
Marion	Indianapolis	84.66	136.25	4	Harding Street	
Marion	Indianapolis	86.76	139.63	2	US 31 south / East Street	West end of US 31 overlap; signed as exit 2A (north) and 2B (south)
Marion	Indianapolis	88.96	143.17	53	I-65 – Indianapolis, Louisville	Signed as exit 53A (north) and 53B (south)
Marion	Indianapolis	90.35	145.40	52	Emerson Avenue	
Marion	Indianapolis	93.42	150.34	49	I-69 north / I-465 north / US 31 north (US 31 north / US 36 east / US 40 east / US 421 north) / SR 67 north – Fort Wayne; Southeastern Avenue	East end of I-465/I-69/US 31/US 36/US 40/SR 67 overlaps; west end of US 421 overlap; I-465 exit 49
Marion	Indianapolis	93.42	150.34	94	I-69 north / I-465 north / US 31 north (US 31 north / US 36 east / US 40 east / US 421 north) / SR 67 north – Fort Wayne; Southeastern Avenue	East end of I-465/I-69/US 31/US 36/US 40/SR 67 overlaps; west end of US 421 overlap; I-465 exit 49
Marion	Wanamaker	95.83	154.22	96	Post Road	
Marion	Acton	98.95	159.24	99	Acton Road	
Shelby	Moral Township	100.94	162.45	101	Pleasant View Road	
Shelby	Sugar Creek	102.58	165.09	103	London Road	
Shelby	Fairland	109.32	175.93	109	Fairland Road	
Shelby	Shelbyville	112.74	181.44	113	SR 9 – Shelbyville, Greenfield	
Shelby	Shelbyville	115.45	185.80	116	SR 44 – Rushville, Shelbyville	
Shelby	Liberty Township	118.48	190.68	119	SR 244 – Andersonville, Milroy	
Shelby–Decatur– Rush county tripoint	Liberty–Adams– Orange township tripoint	123.11	198.13	123	St. Paul, Middletown	
Decatur	Greensburg	131.86	212.21	132	US 421 south – Greensburg	East end of US 421 overlap
Decatur	Greensburg	133.96	215.59	134	SR 3 – Greensburg, Rushville	Signed as exits 134A (south) and 134B (north)
Decatur	New Point	143.00	230.14	143	St. Maurice, New Point	
Franklin–Ripley county line	Batesville	149.02	239.82	149	SR 229 to SR 129 – Oldenburg, Batesville	
Ripley	Adams Township	155.65	250.49	156	SR 101 south / St. Mary Road – Sunman, Milan	
Dearborn	Saint Leon	163.45	263.05	164	SR 1 – Saint Leon, Lawrenceburg	
Dearborn	Harrison Township	168.89	271.80	169	US 52 west to SR 46 – Brookville, West Harrison	West end of US 52 overlap
Dearborn	Harrison Township	171.54	276.07		I-74 east / US 52 east – Cincinnati	Ohio state line
1.000 mi = 1.609 km; 1.000 km = 0.621 mi: Concurrency terminus; Incomplete access

Interstate 74
Previous state: Illinois	Indiana	Next state: Ohio
