= Indiana State Road 267 =

Highway in Indiana

State Road 267
- SR 267 highlighted in red

Route information
- Maintained by INDOT
- Length: 8.7 mi (14.0 km)
- Existed: 1932–present

Major junctions
- South end: I-74 at Brownsburg
- North end: I-65 / US 52 near Whitestown

Location
- Country: United States
- State: Indiana
- Counties: Boone, Hendricks

Highway system
- Indiana State Highway System; Interstate; US; State; Scenic
← SR 265	→ SR 269

State Road 267 in the U.S. state of Indiana is a north–south route connecting Interstate 65 in Boone County to Interstate 74 in Brownsburg. It passes through the town of Brownsburg in the counties of Boone and Hendricks.

== Route description ==
SR 267 is a relatively short route that has been truncated several times over the past years. It begins at Interstate 74 in Brownsburg and heads north towards its northern terminus at I-65 in Boone County. Parts of the route are slated to become part of the Ronald Reagan Parkway extension northward in the future.

== History ==
Between 1917 and 1926 SR 267 was an unsigned route. The highway's length has been truncated multiple times over the past years. The southern terminus at one point was at State Road 37, following the route of State Road 144. In the 1960s SR 267 was moved to a new route east of the old route, between I-70 and US 40, allowing access to the interstate via a new interchange. In the winter of 2013, the route between US 40 and I-74 was removed and given to the county, splitting the route in two. In early 2017, INDOT gave the route between SR 42 and Center Street to Hendricks County. On April 1, 2021, the remaining section south of US 40 was given over to the town of Plainfield, as well as Hendricks County, leaving SR 267 to only run between I-74 and I-65.

== Construction projects ==
- A $3.2 million Major Moves reconstruction project began in 2008 in Brownsburg north of I-74.

== Major intersections ==
County	Location	mi	km	Destinations	Notes
Hendricks	Brownsburg	0.00	0.00	I-74 – Crawfordsville, Indianapolis	Exit number 66 on I-74; southern terminus of SR 267
Boone	Perry–Worth township line	8.70	14.00	I-65 / US 52 – Gary, Lafayette, Indianapolis	Exit number 133 on I-65; north terminus of SR 267; Diverging Diamond Interchange (DDI)
1.000 mi = 1.609 km; 1.000 km = 0.621 mi

== See also ==
- State Road 67
- State Road 167
