= U.S. Route 421 in Indiana =

Segment of American highway

U.S. Route 421
- US 421 highlighted in red

Route information
- Maintained by INDOT
- Length: 255.065 mi (410.487 km)
- Existed: 1951–present

Major junctions
- South end: US 421 near Madison
- US 50 in Versailles; I-74 in Greensburg; I-69 / I-74 / I-465 in Indianapolis; I-70 in Indianapolis; I-69 in Indianapolis; US 24 in Monticello; US 30 in Wanatah; US 6 in Westville I-80 Toll / I-90 Toll / Indiana Toll Road near Otis; I-94 near Michigan City
- North end: US 20 in Michigan City

Location
- Country: United States
- State: Indiana
- Counties: Jefferson, Ripley, Decatur, Rush, Shelby, Marion, Hamilton, Boone, Clinton, Carroll, White, Pulaski, Starke, LaPorte

Highway system
- United States Numbered Highway System; List; Special; Divided; Indiana State Highway System; Interstate; US; State; Scenic
← SR 364	→ SR 427

U.S. Route 421 (US 421) enters Indiana from Kentucky, proceeding northwest to Indianapolis, joining Interstate 465, and then continuing northwest to Michigan City.

US 421 winds through the southern part of Indiana as it runs from Madison, in the southeastern part of the state, to Indianapolis (the capital). North of Greensburg, US 421 intersects and merges with I-74 west, through the Shelbyville area en route to Indianapolis. Originally, US 421 followed Michigan Road into Indianapolis, which turns into Southeastern Avenue and heads to downtown. US 421 then merged with US 40 (Washington St.) and headed to West Street, then turned north, following West Street, Northwestern Avenue (later Martin Luther King Jr. Street), and Michigan Road up to the northwest side of the city. US 421 passed an Indianapolis landmark, the Pyramids. North of Indianapolis, US 421 continues to the north-northwest, providing a direct highway link between Indianapolis and Michigan City. US 421 ends at its junction with US 20 on the south side of Michigan City. Originally, the highway's end was a few miles north at the junction with US 12 near the shores of Lake Michigan.

== Route description ==
=== Kentucky state line to Indianapolis ===
US 421 enters Indiana from Kentucky over the Ohio River. After crossing the Ohio River US 421 has a short concurrency with State Road 56 (SR 56). After the concurrency with SR 56 ends US 421 becomes a four-lane highway. US 421 has an intersection with State Road 62 (SR 62). North of Madison US 421 becomes a two-lane highway, heading north then northeast. US 421 heads towards Versailles, passing through an intersection with State Road 250 (SR 250). In Versailles US 421 has a concurrency with State Road 129 that ends at U.S. Route 50 (US 50). US 421 heads west out of Versailles concurrent with US 50. West of Versailles US 421 heads northwest, towards Greensburg. US 421 passes through Osgood and Napoleon, passing through intersections with State Road 350 (SR 350) and SR 229. US 421 enters Greensburg on the southeast side of town and heads to the northwest side of town. In Greensburg US 421 is concurrent with State Road 46 (SR 46) and intersects State Road 3 (SR 3). On the northwest side of Greensburg US 421 joins Interstate 74 (I-74). I-74/US 421 heads northwest towards Indianapolis, passing near Shelbyville. Near Shelbyville I-74/US 421 has interchanges with State Road 44 (SR 44) and State Road 9 (SR 9). I-74/US 421 enters Indianapolis on the southeast side of the city. US 421 heads north and west around Indianapolis, concurrent with Interstate 69 (I-69) and Interstate 465 (I-465).

=== Indianapolis to Monticello ===
US 421 is concurrent with I-69 until the northeast side of the city and I-465 until the northwest side. US 421 leaves I-465 heading northwest. US 421 becomes a two-lane highway, heading through intersections with State Road 32 (SR 32), State Road 47 (SR 47), State Road 38 (SR 38), and State Road 29 (SR 29), and has a concurrency with State Road 28 (SR 28). US 421 and SR 28 enter Frankfort heading west; the concurrency ends when US 421 heads north concurrent with State Road 38 (SR 38) and State Road 39 (SR 39). US 421/SR 38/SR 39 heads northwest out of Frankfort, and 5 miles (8.0 km) later SR 38 heads due west. US 421/SR 39 heads northwest towards Delphi passing through an intersection with State Road 26 (SR 26). In Delphi US 421/SR 39 are concurrent with State Road 25 (SR 25). US 421/SR 39 heads northwest out of Delphi passing through Pittsburg. West of Pittsburg US 421/SR 39 heads due north towards Monticello. In Monticello the concurrency with SR 39 ends with SR 39 heading east on U.S. Route 24 and US 421 heading west on US 24. US 24/US 421 heads north towards Reynolds, where US 24 heads west and US 421 heads due north.

=== Monticello to Michigan City ===
After the concurrency with US 24, US 421 runs into mostly rural areas as it leaves White County and enters Pulaski County, turning from a northwest trajectory to a due north one. It enters the tiny town of Francesville where it shares a couple of junctions and concurrencies. Just before leaving Pulaski County, US 421 crosses into the unincorporated community of Radioville. After that, it exits Pulaski County and enters Starke County, which also marks the border of Eastern Time and Central Time Zones.

US 421 heads north towards Michigan City, passing through Monon, Wanatah, and Westville. US 421 has intersections with State Road 16 (SR 16), State Road 114 (SR 114), State Road 143 (SR 143), State Road 8 (SR 8), and U.S. Route 30 (US 30). US 421 has concurrencies with State Road 14 (SR 14), State Road 10 (SR 10), U.S. Route 6 (US 6), and State Road 2 (SR 2). US 421 has interchanges with Interstate 80/Interstate 90 and Interstate 94. US 421's northern terminus is at U.S. Route 20 (US 20) in Michigan City.

== History ==
Before US 421 was commissioned in Indiana, the route from Madison to Boyleston was SR 29. This is why SR 129 and State Road 229 (SR 229) have concurrency or terminus at US 421. US 421 from Reynolds to Michigan City was originally State Road 43 (SR 43). This is the reason for SR 143 having its eastern terminus at US 421.

=== Madison ===
US 421 passed through downtown Madison and headed northwest out of Madison. A new route was built east of the old route. The old route was designated State Road 107 until it was decommissioned.

=== Indianapolis ===
US 421 entered Indianapolis on the southeast side of the city and went through downtown. US 421 was routed on Southeastern Avenue, Washington Street, Northwestern Avenue (now Martin Luther King Jr. Street), and Michigan Road.

=== Michigan City ===
US 421 went through Michigan City to U.S. Route 12 (US 12) near Lake Michigan. Then INDOT moved the northern terminus of US 421 south to US 20, on the south side of Michigan City.

== Major intersections ==
County	Location	mi	km	Exit	Destinations	Notes
Ohio River		0.000	0.000	Milton-Madison Bridge US 421 south continues into Kentucky		
Jefferson	Madison	0.532	0.856		SR 56 east – Aurora	Eastern end of SR 56 concurrency
Jefferson	Madison	4.585	7.379		SR 56 / SR 62 – Hanover, Dillsboro	Roundabout; Western end of SR 56 concurrency
Jefferson	Belleview	8.144	13.106		SR 250 – Patriot	Western terminus of eastern section of SR 250
Ripley	Versailles	25.873	41.639		SR 129 south – Vevay	Southern end of SR 129 concurrency
Ripley	Versailles	26.345	42.398		US 50 east / SR 129 north – Lawrenceburg	Eastern end of US 50 concurrency; northern end of SR 129 concurrency
Ripley	Versailles	28.475	45.826		US 50 west – North Vernon	Western end of US 50 concurrency
Ripley	Osgood	31.634	50.910		SR 350 east – Delaware	Western terminus of SR 350
Ripley	Napoleon	37.098	59.703		SR 229 – Batesville, Lawrenceburg	
Decatur	Greensburg	49.725	80.025		SR 46 east – Batesville	Eastern end of SR 46 concurrency
Decatur	Greensburg	50.127	80.672		SR 46 west – Columbus	Western end of SR 46 concurrency
Decatur	Greensburg	51.121	82.271		SR 3 – North Vernon, Rushville	
Decatur	Greensburg	52.414	84.352	132	I-74 – Cincinnati	Eastern end of I-74 concurrency
Shelby–Decatur– Rush county tripoint	Liberty–Adams– Orange township tripoint	62.250	100.182	123	St. Paul, Middletown	
Shelby	Liberty Township	66.695	107.335	119	SR 244 east – Milroy, Brookville	
Shelby	Shelbyville	69.721	112.205	116	SR 44 – Franklin, Rushville	
Shelby	Shelbyville	72.432	116.568	113	SR 9 – Shelbyville, Anderson	
Shelby	Fairland	74.862	120.479	109	Fairland Road	
Shelby	Sugar Creek	82.304	132.455	103	London Road	
Shelby	Moral Township	84.237	135.566	101	Pleasant View Road	
Marion	Acton	86.227	138.769	99	Acton Road	
Marion	Wanamaker	89.345	143.787	96	Post Road	
Marion	Indianapolis	90.739	146.030	94; 49	I-69 south / I-74 west / I-465 west / US 31 south / US 36 west / US 40 west / SR 67 south Southeastern Avenue	Western end of I-74 concurrency; southern end of I-465/I-69/US 31/US 36/US 40/SR 67 concurrency
Marion	Indianapolis	91.753	147.662	48	Shadeland Avenue	Westbound exit and eastbound entrance
Marion	Indianapolis	93.218	150.020	47	US 52 east / Brookville Road	Southern end of US 52 concurrency
Marion	Indianapolis	94.761	152.503	46	US 40 east / Washington Street	Northern end of US 40 concurrency
Marion	Indianapolis	96.367	155.088	44	I-70 – Indianapolis, Dayton	
Marion	Lawrence	98.980	159.293	42	US 36 east / SR 67 north / Pendleton Pike – Pendleton	Northern end of US 36/SR 67 concurrency
Marion	Lawrence	101.195	162.858	40	Shadeland Avenue; 56th Street	
Marion	Indianapolis	103.177	166.047	37	I-69 north – Fort Wayne; Binford Boulevard – Indianapolis	Northern end of I-69/SR 37 concurrency
Marion	Indianapolis	105.089	169.124	35	Allisonville Road	Formerly SR 37A
Marion	Indianapolis	107.184	172.496	33	Keystone Parkway	
Hamilton	Carmel	109.706	176.555	31	US 31 north – Westfield, Kokomo; Meridian Street south	Northern end of US 31 concurrency
Marion	Indianapolis	113.573	182.778	27	I-465 west / US 52 west Michigan Road	Northern end of I-465/US 52 concurrency
Hamilton	No major junctions					
Boone	Rosston	122.512	197.164		SR 32 – Lebanon, Noblesville	
Boone	Marion Township	128.932	207.496		SR 47	
Clinton	Kirklin	133.744	215.240		SR 38	
Clinton	Michigan Township	139.491	224.489		SR 28 east – Tipton	Eastern end of SR 28 concurrency
Clinton	Michigan Township	139.996	225.302		SR 29 north – Logansport	Southern terminus of SR 29
Clinton	Frankfort	146.173	235.243		SR 28 west / SR 38 south / SR 39 south	Western end of SR 28 concurrency; southern end of SR 38/SR 39 concurrency
Clinton	Frankfort	147.035	236.630		SR 75 north	Southern terminus of SR 75
Clinton	Washington–Ross township line	151.992	244.607		SR 38 west	Northern end of SR 38 concurrency
Clinton	Rossville	157.248	253.066		SR 26 – Lafayette, Kokomo	
Carroll	Deer Creek Township	166.090	267.296		SR 18 east	Eastern end of SR 18 concurrency
Carroll	Delphi	168.671	271.450		SR 25 – Logansport, Lafayette	
Carroll	Tippecanoe Township	173.664	279.485		SR 18 west	Western end of SR 18 concurrency
White	Monticello	184.697	297.241		US 24 east / SR 39 north – Logansport	Eastern end of US 24 concurrency; northern end of SR 39 concurrency
White	Reynolds	190.611	306.759		US 24 west / SR 43 south – Wolcott, Remington	Western end of US 24 concurrency; northern terminus of SR 43
White	Monon	198.825	319.978		SR 16	
Pulaski	Salem Township	203.631	327.712		SR 114 west	Eastern terminus of SR 114
Pulaski	White Post Township	209.680	337.447		SR 14 west	Southern end of SR 14 concurrency
Pulaski	White Post Township	212.050	341.261		SR 14 east – Winamac	Northern end of SR 14 concurrency
Pulaski	Cass Township	217.553	350.118		SR 143 west	Eastern terminus of SR 143, US 421 crosses into Central Time after junction
Starke	San Pierre	221.013	355.686		SR 10 west – DeMotte	Southern end of SR 10 concurrency.
Starke	San Pierre	223.032	358.935		SR 10 east – Culver, Argos	Northern end of SR 10 concurrency
LaPorte	LaCrosse	230.077	370.273		SR 8 – Hebron, Knox	
LaPorte	Wanatah	238.124	383.223		US 30 / Lincoln Highway – Merrillville, Valparaiso, Plymouth, Fort Wayne	
LaPorte	Westville	243.954	392.606		US 6 east – Walkerton	Roundabout; southern end of US 6 concurrency
LaPorte	Westville	245.086	394.428		US 6 west – Hobart	Northern end of US 6 concurrency
LaPorte	Westville	245.814	395.599		SR 2 south – Valparaiso	Southern end of SR 2 concurrency
LaPorte	Westville	246.943	397.416		SR 2 north – Laporte	Northern end of SR 2 terminus
LaPorte	New Durham Township	248.847	400.480		I-80 Toll / I-90 Toll / Indiana Toll Road – South Bend, Gary, Chicago	Exit 39 on I-80/I-90
LaPorte	Coolspring Township	253.235	407.542		I-94 – Michigan City, Gary, Chicago, Detroit	Exits 34A-B on I-94, A for southbound traffic towards Westville, B for northbound traffic towards Michigan City
LaPorte	Michigan City	255.065	410.487		US 20 – Michigan City, South Bend, Gary	Northern terminus of US 421
1.000 mi = 1.609 km; 1.000 km = 0.621 mi: Concurrency terminus

== See also ==
U.S. Route 421
Previous state: Kentucky	Indiana	Next state: Terminus
