= Sam Jones Expressway =

4-lane urban expressway in Indianapolis

Sam Jones Expressway (formerly the Airport Expressway and casually the Raymond Street Expressway) is a 4-lane divided highway with partial access control (urban expressway) in the city of Indianapolis. Renamed in 2007 to honor Indianapolis Urban League founder/president Sam H. Jones Sr., it is approximately 1.8 miles (2.9 km) in length and connects Raymond Street (at Holt Road) to High School Road just west of I-465 at the former site of the 1957–2008 passenger terminal at Indianapolis International Airport. Since November 11, 2008, the new passenger terminal is accessed via exit 68 on I-70 much further south.

== Routing ==
The eastern end of the Sam Jones Expressway is at the signalized intersection of South Tibbs Avenue and Raymond Street. East of that intersection the road is named Raymond Street. The western endpoint is a signalized intersection on the grounds of the Indianapolis International Airport, at what was the main entrance to the now-demolished former passenger terminal. Between these two points are traffic interchanges with I-70 (partial), Lynhurst Drive (full), Executive Drive (partial), and I-465/I-74 (full). There is also a grade separation at Roena Street. The road serves pre-move airport hotels based by the old terminal site that remain open and use I-465 and I-70 or High School/Perimeter Road to provide private shuttle service to the new terminal.

== Legal status ==
The Sam Jones Expressway is not an Interstate Highway, nor is it signed as a U.S. or state highway. It exists as a sub-standard freeway only between I-465 and I-70. It is properly named and classified as an expressway because it contains stoplights east of I-70 and west of Executive Drive; as well as a now-removed at-grade railroad crossing just east of its interchange with I-70.

== Renaming ==
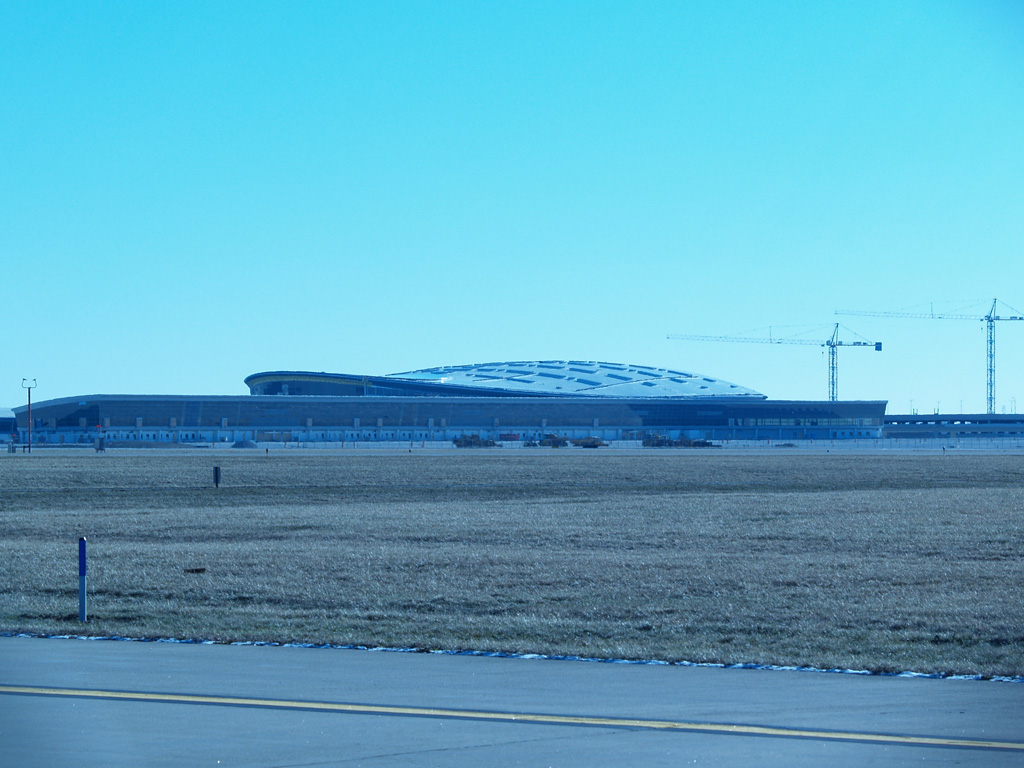
Col. H. Weir Cook Terminal at the Indianapolis International Airport during construction (side view)

The opening of the Col. H. Weir Cook Terminal at the Indianapolis International Airport on November 11, 2008, meant the Sam Jones Expressway would no longer be a direct route for reaching the airport terminal. This prompted the city to rename the Airport Expressway as the Sam Jones Expressway in June 2007, in honor of civil rights leader Sam Jones, the founder and president of the city's Urban League from 1966 until 2002.

== Major intersections ==
The entire route is in Indianapolis, Marion County. All exits are unnumbered.

mi	km	Destinations	Notes
0.000	0.000	High School Road – Air cargo, Signature Flight Support	Western terminus; intersection
		I-74 / I-465 to I-70	I-74/I-465 exit 11
		Executive Drive	Interchange; no entrances to Sam Jones Expressway
		Lynhurst Drive	Interchange; westbound access via Bradbury Avenue
		I-70 – Indianapolis, St. Louis	Exit 75 on I-70; directional access (eastbound to eastbound and westbound to westbound) only
		Holt Road	Intersection
		Tibbs Avenue	Eastern terminus; intersection; roadway continues eastbound as Raymond Street.
1.000 mi = 1.609 km; 1.000 km = 0.621 mi

== See also ==
- Transportation in Indianapolis
