= List of Indiana Scenic Byways =

Indiana Scenic Byways

System information
- Formed: March 14, 2002

Highway names
- Interstates: Interstate X (I-X)
- US Highways: U.S. Route X (US X)
- State: State Road X (SR X)

System links
- Indiana State Highway System; Interstate; US; State; Scenic

List of Indiana Byways
Name	Southern or western terminus	Northern or eastern terminus	Date	Description	Ref(s).
Historic Michigan Road Byway	Madison	Michigan City	September 9, 2011	Follows the route of the Michigan Road in Indiana	
Historic Michigan Road Byway Alternate	Historic Michigan Road Byway south of Versailles	Historic Michigan Road Byway in Napoleon	September 9, 2011	Follows US 421 in Ripley County	
Historic National Road Byway	Illinois state line	Ohio state line	June 9, 1998	Follows the Indiana portion of the National Road	
The Indiana Lincoln Highway Byway	Illinois state line	Ohio state line	October 4, 2011	Follows the Indiana portion of the original route of the Lincoln Highway	
The Indiana Lincoln Highway Byway Alternate	Valparaiso	Fort Wayne	October 4, 2011	Follows the Indiana portion of the 1928 route of the Lincoln Highway	
Ohio River Scenic Byway	Illinois state line	Ohio state line		Closely parallels the Ohio River in Indiana	
Indiana's Historic Pathways Byway	Illinois state line at Vincennes, Indiana (U.S. Route 50 & U.S. Route 150)	Ohio state line, (U.S. Route 50)	2004	Follows US 50 in Indiana	
Indiana's Historic Pathways Byway	Shoals at Shoals, Indiana (U.S. Route 50 & U.S. Route 150)	Clarksville, U.S. Route 150	2004	Follows mostly US 150 in Indiana	
Wabash River Scenic Byway	Ross Hill County Park	Interstate 65/SR 43 in Lafayette	2008 (renamed in 2011)	Closely parallels the Wabash River in Tippecanoe County	
Whitewater Canal Scenic Byway	Hagerstown	Lawrenceburg	June 2008	Follows SR 38, SR 1, SR 121, US 52, Old US 52, and US 50	
