= Indiana State Road 159 =

State highway in Indiana, United States

State Road 159
- SR 159 highlighted in red

Route information
- Maintained by INDOT
- Length: 32.660 mi (52.561 km)

Southern segment
- Length: 6.084 mi (9.791 km)
- South end: SR 67 in Bicknell
- North end: SR 58 in Freelandville

Central segment
- Length: 8.103 mi (13.041 km)
- South end: CR 425 S & CR 900 E/CR 1600 W near Greene-Sullivan State Forest
- North end: SR 54 in Dugger

Northern section
- Length: 18.473 mi (29.729 km)
- South end: SR 48 near Coalmont
- North end: SR 46 in Riley

Location
- Country: United States
- State: Indiana
- Counties: Clay, Knox, Sullivan, Vigo

Highway system
- Indiana State Highway System; Interstate; US; State; Scenic
← SR 158	→ SR 160

State Road 159 in the U. S. state of Indiana exists in three separate sections.

== Route description ==
=== Southern section ===
The southern section begins at State Road 67 at Bicknell and ends at State Road 58 in Freelandville, 6 miles (9.7 km) to the north.

=== Middle section ===
The middle section begins at Pleasantville and ends at State Road 54 at Dugger, 8 miles (13 km) to the north.

=== Northern section ===
The northern section begins at State Road 48 near Shakamak State Park. State Road 159 goes north through Coalmont to State Road 246. 159 is concurrent with 246 through Lewis. North of Lewis, 159 briefly turns west to pass through Blackhawk before turning north towards its northern end at State Road 46 in Riley.

== Major intersections ==
County	Location	mi	km	Destinations	Notes
Knox	Bicknell	0.000	0.000	SR 67 – Vincennes, Worthington	South end of SR 159
Knox	Freelandville	6.084	9.791	SR 58 – Carlisle, Elnora	North end of the section of SR 159
Gap in route
Sullivan	Jefferson Township	6.085	9.793	CR 425 S CR 900 E/CR 1600 W	South end of the center section of SR 159 at the Greene County line
Sullivan	Dugger	14.187	22.832	SR 54 – Sullivan, Bloomfield	North end of the center section of SR 159
Gap in route
Clay	Lewis Township	14.188	22.833	SR 48 – Shelburn, Jasonville	Shakamak State Park
Clay	Lewis Township	19.259	30.994	SR 246 east – Clay City	East end of SR 246 concurrency
Vigo	Pierson Township	20.930	33.684	SR 246 west – Prairie Creek	West end of SR 246 concurrency
Vigo	Riley	32.660	52.561	SR 46 – Terre Haute, Spencer	North terminus of SR 159
1.000 mi = 1.609 km; 1.000 km = 0.621 mi: Concurrency terminus
