= Indiana State Road 48 =

State highway in Indiana, United States

State Road 48
- SR 48 highlighted in red

Route information
- Maintained by INDOT
- Length: 62.426 mi (100.465 km)
- Existed: October 1, 1926–present

Western segment
- Length: 29.963 mi (48.221 km)
- West end: SR 63 in Fairbanks
- Major intersections: US 41 / US 150 in Shelburn SR 23 in North Liberty
- East end: US 231 / SR 67 / SR 157 in Worthington

Central segment
- Length: 5.991 mi (9.642 km)
- West end: SR 43 in Whitehall
- East end: I-69 / SR 45 in Bloomington

Eastern segment
- Length: 26.472 mi (42.603 km)
- West end: SR 229 in Napoleon
- East end: US 50 in Lawrenceburg

Location
- Country: United States
- State: Indiana
- Counties: Clay, Dearborn, Greene, Monroe, Owen, Ripley, Sullivan

Highway system
- Indiana State Highway System; Interstate; US; State; Scenic
← SR 47	→ SR 49

State Road 48 (SR 48) in the U.S. state of Indiana is an east–west state highway running through southern Indiana. It has three distinct and separate sections. The western terminus of SR 48 is at State Road 63 and the eastern terminus at U.S. Route 50.

== Route description ==
=== Western section ===
The western section begins at SR 63 and heads east towards Jasonville, passing through Shelburn at an intersection with U.S. Route 41 (US 41) and U.S. Route 150 (US 150). East of Jasonville SR 48 heads east towards Worthington. Northwest of Worthington SR 48 ends at State Road 157.

=== Middle section ===
The middle section of SR 48 begins at an intersection with State Road 43 and SR 48 heads east towards Bloomington. The eastern terminus of this section is at an interchange with Interstate 69 and State Road 45 (SR 45) in Bloomington.

=== Eastern section ===
The eastern section begins at an intersection with State Road 229 and SR 48 heads east from that intersection. SR 48 passes through intersection with State Road 129, State Road 101, and State Road 148 before entering Lawrenceburg. In Lawrenceburg SR 48 has an intersection with US 50, this intersection is the eastern terminus of SR 48.

== Major intersections ==
County	Location	mi	km	Destinations	Notes
Sullivan	Fairbanks	0.000	0.000	SR 63 – Graysville, Fairbanks	Western terminus of SR 48
Sullivan	Shelburn	7.000	11.265	US 41 / US 150 – Terre Haute, Sullivan, Vincennes	
Clay	Coalmont	15.908	25.601	SR 159 north – Coalmont	Southern terminus of SR 159
Greene	Jasonville	19.530	31.430	SR 59 – Linton, Clay City	
Greene	Worthington	29.963	48.221	SR 157 – Coal City, Worthington	Eastern terminus of the western section of SR 48
Gap in route
Monroe	Richland Township	29.964	48.222	SR 43 – Spencer, SR 54	Western terminus of middle section of SR 48
Monroe	Bloomington	35.954	57.862	I-69 / SR 45 – Evansville, Indianapolis	Eastern terminus of middle section SR 48; Former SR 37
Gap in route
Ripley	Napoleon	35.955	57.864	SR 229 to US 421 – Napoleon, Batesville	Western terminus of Eastern section
Ripley	Delaware Township	39.863	64.153	SR 129 – Batesville, Delaware	
Ripley	Franklin Township	46.570	74.947	SR 101 – Milan, Sunman	
Dearborn	Aurora	56.678	91.214	SR 148 east – Aurora	
Dearborn	Lawrenceburg	62.426	100.465	US 50 – Lawrenceburg, Aurora	Eastern terminus of SR 48
1.000 mi = 1.609 km; 1.000 km = 0.621 mi

== See also ==
- List of Indiana state highways
