= Indiana State Road 157 =

State highway in Indiana, United States

State Road 157
- SR 157 highlighted in red

Route information
- Maintained by INDOT
- Length: 26.838 mi (43.192 km)
- Existed: 1932–present

Major junctions
- South end: US 231 / SR 54 at Bloomfield
- US 231 at Worthington
- North end: SR 59 / SR 246 at Clay City

Location
- Country: United States
- State: Indiana
- Counties: Clay, Greene, Owen

Highway system
- Indiana State Highway System; Interstate; US; State; Scenic
← SR 156	→ SR 158

State Road 157 in the U.S. state of Indiana is a north–south route in Clay, Greene and Owen counties that covers a distance of about 26 miles (42 km).

== Route description ==
The southern terminus of State Road 157 is at State Road 54 in Bloomfield. It runs north to Worthington where it intersects with U.S. Route 231 and State Road 67 (which are concurrent here). A few miles to the north, it intersects with State Road 48. It then passes through the southwest corner of Owen County with no major intersections and continues into Clay county. Its northern terminus is at State Road 59 and State Road 246 in Clay City.

== Major intersections ==
County	Location	mi	km	Destinations	Notes
Greene	Bloomfield	0.000	0.000	US 231 / SR 54 – Loogootee, Bedford, Switz City	Southern terminus of SR 157
Greene	Worthington	9.511	15.306	US 231 south / SR 67 south	Southern end of US 231/SR 67 concurrency
Greene	Worthington	9.557	15.381	US 231 north / SR 67 north – Spencer	Northern end of US 231/SR 67 concurrency
Greene	Jefferson Township	13.066	21.028	SR 48 west – Jasonville	Eastern terminus of SR 48
Clay	Clay City	26.838	43.192	SR 59 / SR 246 – Linton, Brazil, Spencer	Northern terminus of SR 157
1.000 mi = 1.609 km; 1.000 km = 0.621 mi: Concurrency terminus
