= Indiana State Road 46 =

Highway in Indiana

State Road 46
- SR 46 highlighted in red

Route information
- Maintained by INDOT
- Length: 156.72 mi (252.22 km)
- Existed: October 1, 1926–present

Major junctions
- West end: I-70 / US 40 at Terre Haute
- US 231 at Spencer; I-69 / SR 45 at Bloomington; I-65 at Columbus; US 31 at Columbus
- East end: US 52 near West Harrison

Location
- Country: United States
- State: Indiana
- Counties: Bartholomew, Brown, Clay, Dearborn, Decatur, Monroe, Owen, Ripley, Vigo

Highway system
- Indiana State Highway System; Interstate; US; State; Scenic
← SR 45	→ SR 47

State Road 46 in the U.S. state of Indiana is an east–west state highway in the southern half of Indiana.

== Route description ==
The western terminus of SR 46 is at US 40 east of Terre Haute. It is a four-lane highway with signalized intersections from US 40 past SR 42 and Terre Haute Regional Airport to I-70, where it meets the SR 641 bypass. After departing 641 a mile south of the Interstate, 46 becomes a heavily traveled modernized 2-lane highway through Spencer where it intersects SR 67 and US 231. It then proceeds to Ellettsville where it becomes a 4-lane expressway until an Interchange with I-69. It then enters the college town of Bloomington. It multiplexes with SR 45 on a road known as "The Bypass" just north of Indiana University where it passes by the athletic complex. It then goes by the College Mall in Bloomington where it makes a left turn and winds towards the artist colony of Nashville passing by SR 446 and Lake Monroe. After making a right turn at SR 135 in Nashville it proceeds to Columbus, where it goes under I-65 at an interchange. It then heads to Greensburg where it multiplexes with SR 3 and again becomes a 4-lane expressway.

At this point it makes a right turn and becomes a minor 2-lane highway as it closely follows I-74 until its eastern terminus at US 52 in northeastern Dearborn County.

== History ==
Until 1936, SR 46's western terminus was at the Illinois–Indiana state line north of West Terre Haute. When U.S. Route 150 (US 150) was commissioned on that route, SR 46 was pulled back to end with SR 42 at Poplar and Seventh streets in downtown Terre Haute. Later, when the north–south four-lane road from I-70 to US 40 was completed, the terminus was moved to US 40 east of the city. And, briefly, it was moved south to the SR 46 exit from SR 641 when US 40 was relocated from Wabash Avenue to I-70, before being returned to form a "wrong way" multiplex with the US route, which continues as of 2024.

The former eastern terminus was at the Ohio–Indiana border when US 52 was commissioned along that portion of the route.

In 1974, the portion of the route west of Columbus to the Brown County Line was named Jonathan Moore Pike, after a settler in the area who served in the Revolutionary War as a member of the Commander-in-Chief's Guard.

Until recently, "The Bypass" portion in Bloomington had congestion. However, a major construction project completed in November 2012 widened the road to 4 lanes and alleviated the issue on this part of the roadway. SR 46 as a result of this project is now four lanes from Elletsville until the intersection with SR 446.

== Major intersections ==
County	Location	mi	km	Destinations	Notes
Vigo	Terre Haute	0.00	0.00	I-70 / US 40 / SR 641 south – Terre Haute, Indianapolis	Exit 11 on I-70 - Western terminus of SR 46; Northern end of SR 641 and concurrency
Vigo	Terre Haute	1.50	2.41	SR 641 south	Southern End of SR 641 concurrency
Vigo	Riley	3.92	6.31	SR 159 south – Jasonville	Northern terminus of SR 159
Clay	Sugar Ridge Township	11.83	19.04	SR 59 – Linton, Brazil	
Owen	Vandalia	32.01	51.52	SR 246 west – Clay City	Eastern terminus of SR 246
Owen	Spencer	37.59	60.50	US 231 south / SR 67 south – Worthington	Western end of US 231 and SR 67 concurrences
Owen	Spencer	38.42	61.83	US 231 north / SR 67 north – Greencastle, Mooresville	Eastern end of US 231 and SR 67 concurrences
Owen	Washington Township	40.32	64.89	SR 43 south	Northern terminus of SR 43
Monroe	Bloomington	52.43	84.38	I-69 / SR 45 south – Evansville, Indianapolis	Western end of SR 45 concurrency
Monroe	Bloomington	55.78	89.77	SR 45 north	Eastern end of SR 45 concurrency
Monroe	Bloomington	57.75	92.94	SR 446 south	Northern terminus of SR 446
Brown	Nashville	73.02	117.51	SR 135 north – Nashville	Western end of SR 135 concurrency
Brown	Washington Township	76.10	122.47	SR 135 south – Brownstown	Eastern end of SR 135 concurrency
Bartholomew	Columbus	89.00	143.23	I-65 – Indianapolis, Louisville	Exit 58 on I-65
Bartholomew	Columbus	90.58	145.77	SR 11 south – Seymour	Northern terminus of SR 11; trumpet interchange
Bartholomew	Columbus Township	95.39	153.52	SR 7 south – North Vernon	Northern terminus of SR 7
Bartholomew	Columbus Township	96.52	155.33	US 31 – Columbus, Seymour	
Bartholomew	Clifty Township			SR 9 north – Shelbyville	Southern terminus of SR 9
Decatur	Greensburg	116.48	187.46	SR 3 south – North Vernon	Western end of SR 3 concurrency
Decatur	Greensburg	119.78	192.77	SR 3 north – Rushville	Eastern end of SR 3 concurrency
Decatur	Greensburg	121.61	195.71	US 421 north – Indianapolis	Western end of US 421 concurrency
Decatur	Greensburg	122.02	196.37	US 421 south – Madison, Versailles	Eastern end of US 421 concurrency
Ripley	Batesville	136.52	219.71	SR 229 – Batesville, Oldenburg	
Ripley	Batesville	138.00	222.09	SR 129 south – Versailles	Northern terminus of SR 129
Ripley	Adams Township	143.82	231.46	SR 101 – Sunman	
Dearborn	St. Leon	151.43	243.70	SR 1 – Lawrenceburg, Brookville	
Dearborn	Harrison Township	156.72	252.22	US 52 to I-74 - Cincinnati	Eastern terminus of SR 46
1.000 mi = 1.609 km; 1.000 km = 0.621 mi: Concurrency terminus
