= Indiana State Road 59 =

State highway in Indiana, United States

State Road 59
- SR 59 highlighted in red

Route information
- Maintained by INDOT
- Length: 79.53 mi (127.99 km)
- Existed: October 1, 1926–present

Major junctions
- South end: SR 58 at Sandborn
- US 36 at Bellmore; US 40 at Brazil; I-70 near Center Point
- North end: SR 47 at Waveland

Location
- Country: United States
- State: Indiana
- Counties: Clay, Greene, Knox, Montgomery, Parke

Highway system
- Indiana State Highway System; Interstate; US; State; Scenic
← SR 58	→ SR 60

State Road 59 is a north–south road in Central Indiana that covers a distance of about 80 miles (130 km) through five counties.

== Route description ==
State Road 59 begins at State Road 58 and heads north towards Sandborn. In Sandborn SR 59 has an intersection with State Road 67. Then SR 59 heads north towards Linton where it is concurrent with State Road 54. Both routes leave Linton on the northwest side of town. North of Linton, SR 54 turns west toward Dugger. SR 59 heads north passing through Midland and the east side of Jasonville, where it intersects State Road 48. SR 59 heads north from Jasonville towards Clay City where it has a concurrency with State Road 246. During the concurrency there is an intersection with State Road 157 in downtown Clay City. SR 59 heads north from Clay City toward Brazil; on the way to Brazil it passes under Interstate 70. In Brazil, SR 59 has an intersection with U.S. Route 40 (US 40). SR 59 leaves Brazil heading north toward Waveland, passing through an intersection with U.S. Route 36 in Bellmore and a concurrency with State Road 236. In Waveland SR 59 enters from the south and has an intersection with State Road 47.

== History ==
From 1917 to 1926 SR 59 was number as State Road 9, from Linton to Brazil, after 1926 renumbering this route became part of SR 59.

== Major intersections ==
County	Location	mi	km	Destinations	Notes
Knox	Vigo Township	0.00	0.00	SR 58 – Elnora	Southern terminus of SR 59
Knox	Sandborn	1.62	2.61	SR 67 – Edwardsport, Worthington	
Greene	Linton	11.84	19.05	SR 54 east – Bedford	Southern end of SR 54 concurrency
Greene	Linton	14.66	23.59	SR 54 west – Sullivan	Northern end of SR 54 concurrency
Greene	Jasonville	21.50	34.60	SR 48	
Clay	Clay City	32.25	51.90	SR 246 west	Southern end of SR 246 concurrency
Clay	Clay City			SR 157 south	Northern terminus of SR 157
Clay	Clay City	33.76	54.33	SR 246 east	Northern end of SR 246 concurrency
Clay	Sugar Ridge Township	41.08	66.11	SR 46 – Terre Haute, Spencer	
Clay	Posey Township	45.89	73.85	SR 42 – Terre Haute, Mooresville	
Clay	Posey Township	46.13	74.24	I-70 – Terre Haute, Indianapolis	exit number 23 on I-70
Clay	Brazil	51.27	82.51	US 40 – Terre Haute, Indianapolis	
Parke	Union Township	67.91	109.29	US 36 – Rockville, Indianapolis	
Parke	Greene Township	73.92	118.96	SR 236 west	Western end of SR 236 concurrency
Parke	Greene Township	76.53	123.16	SR 236 east – North Salem	Eastern end of SR 236 concurrency
Montgomery	Waveland	79.53	127.99	SR 47 – Crawfordsville	Northern terminus of SR 59
1.000 mi = 1.609 km; 1.000 km = 0.621 mi: Concurrency terminus
