= Coalmont, Indiana =

- Census-designated place
- Location of Coalmont in Clay County, Indiana.

- Location in Clay County
- Coordinates: 39°11′36″N 87°13′52″W
- Country: United States
- State: Indiana
- County: Clay
- Township: Lewis

Area
  - Total: 1.50 sq mi (3.89 km^{2})
  - Land: 1.50 sq mi (3.89 km^{2})
  - Water: 0.0039 sq mi (0.01 km^{2})
- Elevation: 630 ft (190 m)

Population (2020)
  - Total: 354
  - Density: 235.9/sq mi (91.08/km^{2})
- ZIP code: 47438
- FIPS code: 18-14032
- GNIS feature ID: 432712

Coalmont is an unincorporated community and census-designated place in Lewis Township, Clay County, Indiana, United States. It is part of the Terre Haute Metropolitan Statistical Area. As of the 2020 census, Coalmont had a population of 354.

== History ==
A post office was established at Coalmont in 1901. Deposits of coal in the area caused the name to be selected.

== Geography ==
Coalmont is located in southwestern Clay County at 39°11′36″N 87°13′52″W. Its western border is the Sullivan County line. Indiana State Road 159 runs north–south through the center of the community, and IN 48 forms the southern edge of the CDP. Shakamak State Park is directly to the south. Jasonville is 3.4 miles (5.5 km) to the southeast on routes 159 and 48, and Hymera is 4 miles (6 km) to the west on IN 48.

== Demographics ==
Historical population
| Census | Pop. | Note | %± |
|---|---|---|---|
| 2020 | 354 | | — |
U.S. Decennial Census

== Famous Residents ==
Everett Sanders, the future personal secretary to President Coolidge, was born near Coalmont in 1882.
