= Jefferson Township, Greene County, Indiana =

Jefferson Township
- Township
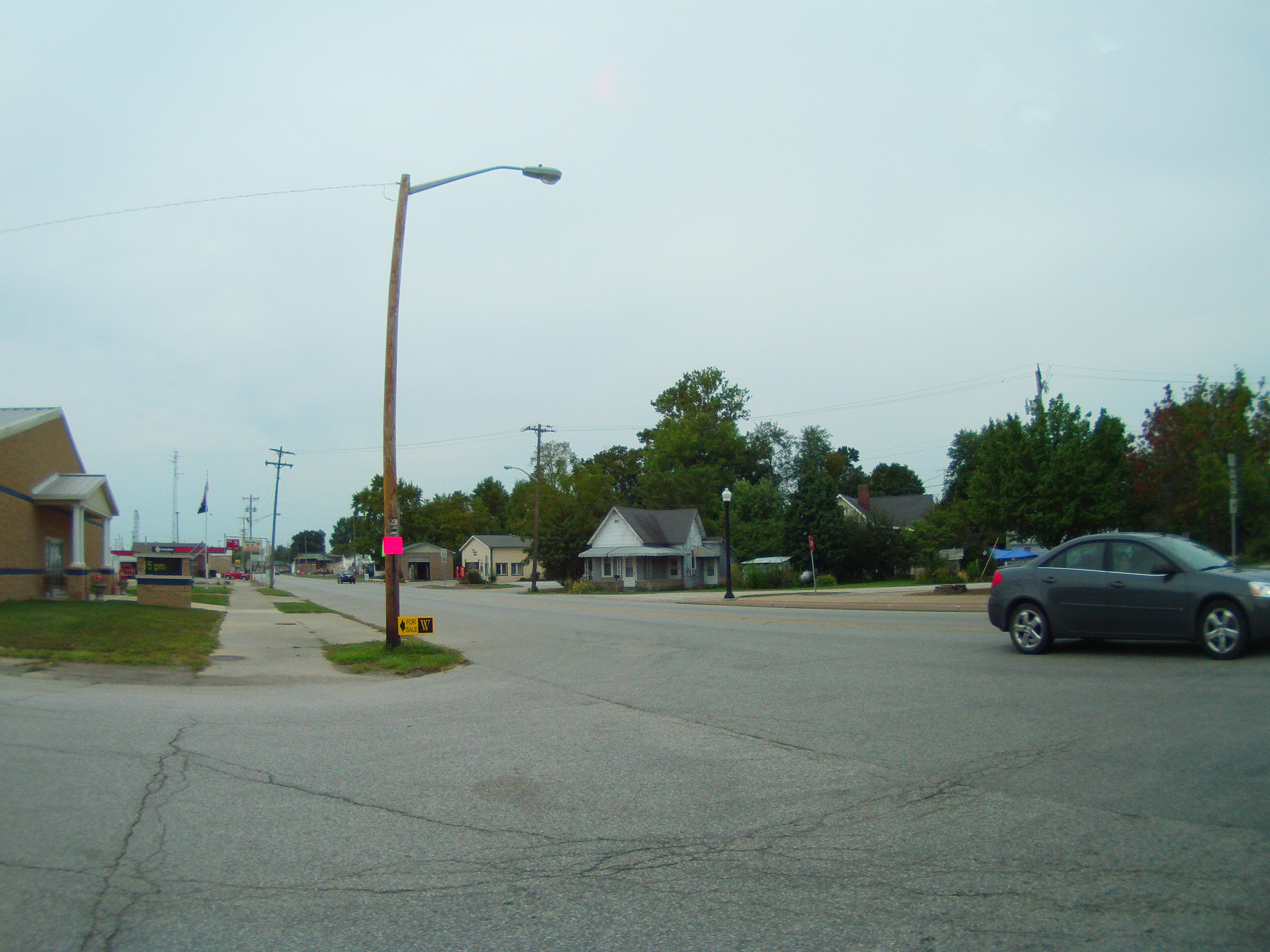
- View of Worthington, in Jefferson Township

- Location in Greene County
- Coordinates: 39°08′01″N 86°58′56″W
- Country: United States
- State: Indiana
- County: Greene

Government
  - Type: Indiana township

Area
  - Total: 32.55 sq mi (84.3 km^{2})
  - Land: 32.41 sq mi (83.9 km^{2})
  - Water: 0.14 sq mi (0.36 km^{2}) 0.43%
- Elevation: 597 ft (182 m)

Population (2020)
  - Total: 1,959
  - Density: 60.44/sq mi (23.34/km^{2})
- GNIS feature ID: 0453485

Jefferson Township is one of fifteen townships in Greene County, Indiana, USA. As of the 2020 census, its population was 1,959, down from 2,094 at 2010.

Historical population
Census	Pop.	Note	%±
1890	2,318		—
1900	2,562		10.5%
1910	2,677		4.5%
1920	2,588		−3.3%
1930	2,383		−7.9%
1940	2,315		−2.9%
1950	2,159		−6.7%
1960	2,146		−0.6%
1970	2,116		−1.4%
1980	2,041		−3.5%
1990	1,964		−3.8%
2000	2,036		3.7%
2010	2,094		2.8%
2020	1,959		−6.4%
Source: US Decennial Census

== Geography ==
According to the 2010 census, the township has a total area of 32.55 square miles (84.3 km^{2}), of which 32.41 square miles (83.9 km^{2}) (or 99.57%) is land and 0.14 square miles (0.36 km^{2}) (or 0.43%) is water. The streams of Bunnell Branch, Corbin Creek, Eel River and Lemon Creek run through this township.

=== Cities and towns ===
- Worthington

=== Unincorporated towns ===
- Johnstown
- Point Commerce
- Rincon

(This list is based on USGS data and may include former settlements.)

=== Adjacent townships ===
- Jefferson Township, Owen County (north)
- Franklin Township, Owen County (northeast)
- Highland Township (east)
- Richland Township (southeast)
- Fairplay Township (south)
- Smith Township (west)

=== Cemeteries ===
The township contains eight cemeteries: Barton, Bullerman, Dixon, Griffith, Hayes, Oak Grove, Stanley and Steward.

=== Major highways ===
- US 231
- SR 48
- SR 157

== Education ==
Jefferson Township residents may obtain a library card from the Worthington-Jefferson Township Public Library in Worthington.
