= Indiana State Road 54 =

State highway in Indiana, United States

State Road 54
- SR 54 highlighted in red

Route information
- Maintained by INDOT
- Length: 55.17 mi (88.79 km)
- Existed: October 1, 1926–present

Major junctions
- West end: US 41 / US 150 at Sullivan
- US 231 in Bloomfield
- East end: SR 37 near Oolitic

Location
- Country: United States
- State: Indiana
- Counties: Greene, Lawrence, Sullivan

Highway system
- Indiana State Highway System; Interstate; US; State; Scenic
← SR 53	→ SR 55

State Road 54 (SR 54) is an east–west road in Central Indiana in Greene, Lawrence and Sullivan counties.

== Route description ==
The western terminus of SR 54 is at U.S. Route 41. SR 54 heads east from US 41 toward Linton. Before Linton SR 54 meets SR 59 and they are concurrent until Linton. In Linton SR 59 heads south and SR 54 heads east toward Switz City. In Switz City SR 54 meets State Road 67. After Switz City SR 54 meets U.S. Route 231. Then the two route head east toward Bloomfield. In Bloomfield US 231 heads south and SR 54 heads east. After Bloomfield SR 54 heads east until State Road 43, where SR 54 turns southeast toward Avoca. In Avoca SR 54 meets State Road 37, at the eastern terminus of SR 54.

== History ==
Between 1917 and 1926, today's route of SR 54 was Indiana State Road 4 and Indiana State Road 30; also at that time the route number SR 54 was routed near today's route of Indiana State Road 63. Before the early 1980s SR 54 went as far west as SR 63.

== Major intersections ==
County	Location	mi	km	Destinations	Notes
Sullivan	Hamilton Township	0.00	0.00	US 41 / US 150 – Terre Haute, Vincennes	Western terminus of SR 54
Sullivan	Dugger	8.37	13.47	SR 159 south	Northern terminus of SR 159
Greene	Stockton Township	12.55	20.20	SR 59 north – Jasonville	Northern end of SR 59 concurrency
Greene	Linton	15.37	24.74	SR 59 south – Sandborn	Southern end of SR 59 concurrency
Greene	Switz City	21.30	34.28	SR 67 – Sandborn, Worthington	
Greene	Fairplay Township	23.80	38.30	US 231 north / SR 57 – Worthington, Washington	Western end of US 231 concurrency
Greene	Bloomfield	27.80	44.74	US 231 south / SR 157 north – Loogootee, Worthington	Eastern end of US 231 concurrency; Southern terminus of SR 157
Greene	Center Township	39.40	63.41	SR 43 north – Spencer	Southern terminus of SR 43
Greene	Center Township	39.62	63.76	SR 445 north	Southern terminus of SR 445
Greene	Center Township	41.17	66.26	SR 45 north – Bloomington	Northern end of SR 45 concurrency
Greene	Center Township	41.31	66.48	SR 45 south to I-69	Southern end of SR 45 concurrency
Lawrence	Springville	49.91	80.32	SR 58 west	Western end of SR 58 concurrency
Lawrence	Avoca	55.17	88.79	SR 37 / SR 58 east – Bedford, Bloomington	Eastern end of SR 58 concurrency; Eastern terminus of SR 54
1.000 mi = 1.609 km; 1.000 km = 0.621 mi: Concurrency terminus
