= Point Commerce, Indiana =

- Unincorporated community
- Location within Indiana Location within the United States
- Coordinates: 39°07′31″N 86°57′55″W
- Country: United States
- State: Indiana
- County: Greene
- Township: Jefferson
- Elevation: 581 ft (177 m)
- ZIP code: 47471
- FIPS code: 18-60876
- GNIS feature ID: 441389

Point Commerce is an unincorporated community in Jefferson Township, Greene County, Indiana. It is part of the Bloomington, Indiana, Metropolitan Statistical Area.

== History ==
Point Commerce was so named in anticipation that two canals would meet at that point. A post office was established at Point Commerce in 1837, and remained in operation until it was discontinued in 1869.

== Geography ==
Point Commerce is located along the banks of the Eel River, near its confluence with the White River. The nearby town of Worthington is situated directly across the Eel River from Point Commerce.

== Demographics ==
Historical population
Census	Pop.	Note	%±
1850	237		—
U.S. Decennial Census

Point Commerce was never separately returned in a U.S. Census. However, the final report for the Census of 1850 provided a population estimate of 237 for the community.
