= Indiana State Road 558 =

State highway in Indiana, United States

State Road 558
- SR 558 highlighted in red

Route information
- Maintained by INDOT
- Length: 1.108 mi (1.783 km)

Major junctions
- West end: US 231 / SR 58 to I-69 in Madison Township
- East end: Crane NSWC

Location
- Country: United States
- State: Indiana
- Counties: Daviess

Highway system
- Indiana State Highway System; Interstate; US; State; Scenic
← SR 550	→ SR 641

State Road 558 (SR 558) is a State Road in the southwestern section of the U.S. state of Indiana. Running for about 1.1 miles (1.8 km) in a general east–west direction, connecting the Naval Surface Warfare Center Crane Division with U.S. Route 231 (US 231), passing through the town of Crane. SR 558 was originally introduced in the 1950s to connect the Crane Naval Depot, now Naval Surface Warfare Center Crane Division with SR 45, now US 231.

== Route description ==
SR 558 begins at an intersection with U.S. Route 231 and State Road 58 in rural Daviess County. The road heads east before curving southeast. The SR 558 designation ends at the Daviess–Martin county line, at the western town limits of the town of Crane. The continues east as a local road passing through the town of Crane and entering the Naval Surface Warfare Center Crane Division. The highest traffic count is at the western end of SR 558, where 3,989 vehicles travel the highway on average each day. The lowest traffic count is at the eastern end of SR 558, where 3,403 vehicles travel the highway on average each day.

== History ==
SR 558 was first designated between 1952 and 1953. The original routing started at SR 45 (now US 231) and SR 58 and ran east-southeast to the Daviess–Martin county line much as it does today.

== Major intersections ==
The entire route is in Daviess County.

Location	mi	km	Destinations	Notes
Madison Township	0.000	0.000	US 231 / SR 58 – Loogootee, Bloomington	Western terminus of SR 558
Crane	1.108	1.783	CR 1400 E	Naval Surface Warfare Center Crane Division; eastern terminus of SR 558
1.000 mi = 1.609 km; 1.000 km = 0.621 mi
