= Avoca, Indiana =

- Census-designated place
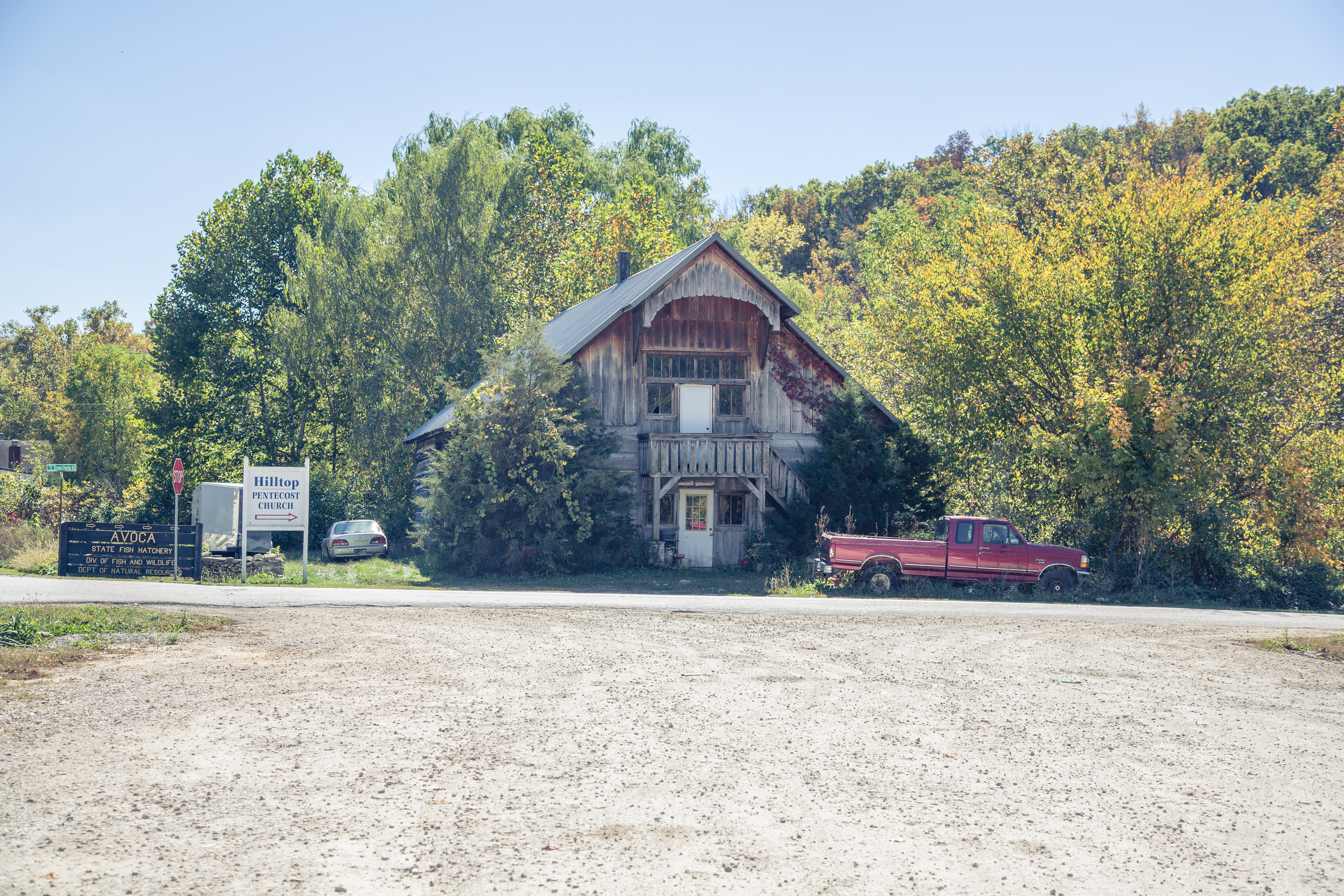

- Location in Lawrence County, Indiana

- Location within Indiana Location within the United States
- Coordinates: 38°55′02″N 86°33′20″W
- Country: United States
- State: Indiana
- County: Lawrence
- Township: Marshall

Area
  - Total: 2.10 sq mi (5.43 km^{2})
  - Land: 2.10 sq mi (5.43 km^{2})
  - Water: 0 sq mi (0.00 km^{2})
- Elevation: 571 ft (174 m)

Population (2020)
  - Total: 545
  - Density: 260.1/sq mi (100.43/km^{2})
- ZIP code: 47420
- FIPS code: 18-02890
- GNIS feature ID: 2629855

Avoca is an unincorporated community and census-designated place in Marshall Township, Lawrence County, Indiana, United States. As of the 2020 census, Avoca had a population of 545.

== History ==
Avoca was platted in 1819. The community likely took its name after the River Avoca, which was mentioned in a poem by Thomas Moore. The Avoca post office was established in 1856.

== Geography ==
Avoca is located in northwestern Lawrence County in the southwest corner of Marshall Township. Indiana State Road 37 runs along the eastern edge of the community, leading north 19 miles (31 km) to Bloomington and south 6 miles (10 km) to Bedford, the Lawrence county seat. State Road 58 passes through the center of Avoca, joining SR 37 southbound but leading west 11 miles (18 km) to Owensburg. State Road 54 has its eastern terminus at SR 37 and leads northwest 27 miles (43 km) to Bloomfield.

According to the U.S. Census Bureau, the Avoca census-designated place has an area of 2.1 square miles (5.4 km^{2}), all of it recorded as land. The community is in the valley of Goose Creek, which flows southeast to Salt Creek, part of the White River watershed.

=== Avoca Park ===
The Avoca State Fish Hatchery was built in 1819 and first served as a grist mill until 1919, when it was purchased by the DNR, who began building ponds in 1923. The Hatchery stocked Indiana's waters with fish for years until it was decommissioned by the DNR in 2013 and fell into disrepair. Bedford Mayor Shawna Girgis asked Bedford Park Director, Barry Jeskewich, to restore this historical location for Lawrence County. Barry Jeskewich partnered with James Farmer, Indiana University Sustaining Hoosier Communities to obtained a grant to preserve this beloved green space for the surrounding community. Avoca State Fish Hatchery was renamed Avoca Park and Recreation and is now in the hands of the local community.

== Demographics ==
Historical population
Census	Pop.	Note	%±
2020	545		—
U.S. Decennial Census
