= Indiana State Road 58 =

Highway in Indiana

State Road 58
- SR 58 highlighted in red

Route information
- Maintained by INDOT
- Length: 122.07 mi (196.45 km)
- Existed: October 1, 1926–present

Major junctions
- West end: SR 63 at Merom
- US 41 / US 150 at Carlisle; I-69 near Elnora; US 231 at Farlen; US 231 / SR 45 near Crane
- East end: I-65 near Columbus

Location
- Country: United States
- State: Indiana
- Counties: Bartholomew, Greene Jackson, Knox, Lawrence, Daviess, Sullivan

Highway system
- Indiana State Highway System; Interstate; US; State; Scenic
← SR 57	→ SR 59

State Road 58 is an east–west road in Central Indiana. State Road 58 runs from Merom in the west to Columbus in the east, a distance of approximately 122 miles (196 km). Along its route it has concurrencies with one U.S. Route and six other Indiana state roads.

== Route description ==
SR 58 western terminus is at State Road 63 (SR 63) in Merom. SR 58 heads south and east towards Carlisle. In Carlisle SR 58 has an intersection with U.S. Route 41/U.S. Route 150. SR 58 heads southeast from Carlisle towards Freelandville. In Freelandville SR 58 has an intersection with the northern terminus of State Road 159. East of Freelandville SR 58 heads east and has a concurrency with State Road 67 (SR 67). Then SR 58 heads east towards Elnora where SR 58 has a concurrency with State Road 57 (SR 57). SR 58 heads south after the concurrency with SR 57. South of Elnora SR 57 has an intersection with the eastern terminus of State Road 358 (SR 358). At SR 358, SR 58 heads due east towards U.S. Route 231 (US 231), passing through Odon. SR 58 has a concurrency with US 231, at the northern end of the concurrency is also the western terminus of State Road 45 (SR 45). SR 45 and SR 58 heads east until SR 45 turns north. SR 58 heads east from the western end of the concurrency with SR 45. SR 58 then has a concurrency with State Road 54 (SR 54). At the intersection with State Road 37 SR 54 ends and SR 58 follows SR 37 south toward Bedford. SR 58 passes through the north part of Bedford and then heads northeast towards Columbus. The western terminus of SR 58 is at an interchange with Interstate 65.

== History ==
Original SR 58 followed the same route State Road 156 follows in southeastern Indiana. Then route was changed to a route that follows the route of today and the route that State Road 158. SR 58 was rerouted north to the route of today.

== Major intersections ==
County	Location	mi	km	Destinations	Notes
Sullivan	Merom	0.00	0.00	SR 63 north – Terre Haute	Western terminus of SR 58
Sullivan	Carlisle	13.56	21.82	US 41 / US 150 – Vincennes, Terre Haute	
Knox	Freelandville			SR 159 south – Bicknell	Northern terminus of SR 159
Knox	Westphalia	28.72	46.22	SR 67 south – Vincennes, Bicknell	Southern end of SR 67 concurrency
Knox	Westphalia	30.02	48.31	SR 67 north – Worthington	Northern end of SR 67 concurrency
Knox	Sandborn	31.21	50.23	SR 59 north – Sandborn, Linton	Southern terminus of SR 59
Daviess	Elnora	36.53	58.79	SR 57 south – Evansville, Washington	Western end of SR 57 concurrency
Daviess	Elnora	36.65	58.98	SR 57 north – Worthington	Eastern end of SR 57 concurrency
Daviess	Elmore Township			SR 358 west – Plainville	Eastern terminus of SR 358
Daviess	Elmore Township			I-69 – Evansville, Indianapolis	I-69 exit 76.
Daviess	Madison Township	47.64	76.67	US 231 south – Loogootee	Southern end of US 231 concurrency
Daviess	Madison Township			SR 558 east – Crane	Western terminus of SR 558
Greene	Scotland	52.33	84.22	US 231 north / SR 45 north – Worthington	I-69 Exit 87; Northern end of US 231 concurrency; Western terminus and end of SR 45 concurrency.
Greene	Jackson Township	61.40	98.81	SR 45 north – Bloomington	Eastern end of SR 45 concurrency
Lawrence	Springville	69.04	111.11	SR 54 west – Bloomfield	Western end of SR 54 concurrency
Lawrence	Avoca	74.30	119.57	SR 37 north / SR 54 – Bloomington	Northern end of SR 37 concurrency; Eastern terminus and end of SR 54 concurrency
Lawrence	Bedford	77.33	124.45	SR 37 south – Bedford	Southern end of SR 37 concurrency
Lawrence	Heltonville	88.88	143.04	SR 446 – Bloomington	
Jackson	Freetown	103.61	166.74	SR 135 south – Brownstown	Southern end of SR 135 concurrency
Jackson	Freetown	104.87	168.77	SR 135 north – Greenwood	Northern end of SR 135 concurrency
Jackson	Freetown			SR 258 east – Seymour	Western terminus of SR 258
Bartholomew	Columbus	122.07	196.45	I-65 – Indianapolis, Louisville	I-65 exit 64; eastern terminus of SR 58.
1.000 mi = 1.609 km; 1.000 km = 0.621 mi: Concurrency terminus
