= Crane, Indiana =

- Town
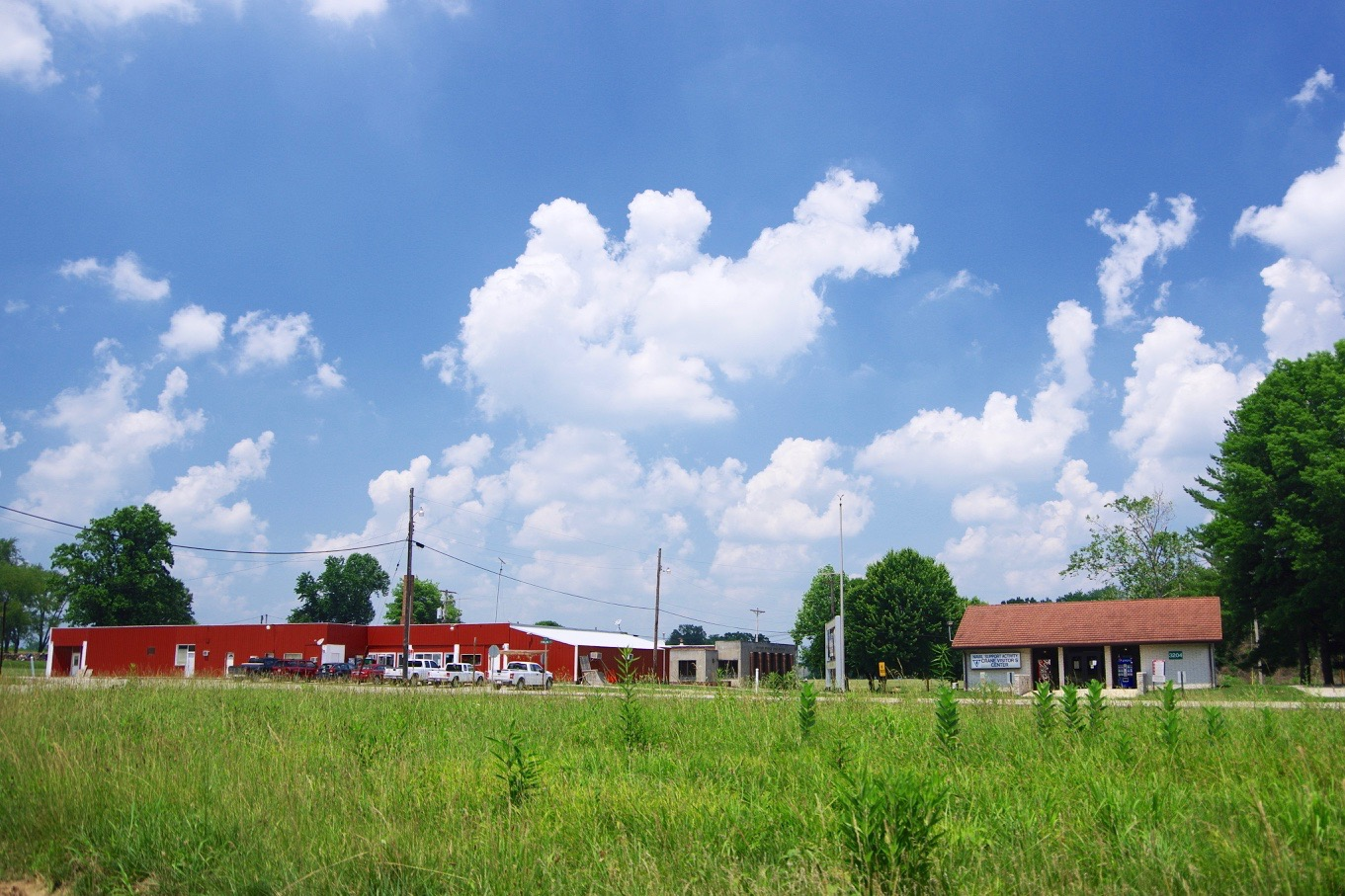
- Crane NSA Visitor Center (right) and the Lonely Night Saloon (left)

- Location in Martin County, Indiana
- Coordinates: 38°53′39″N 86°54′05″W
- Country: United States
- State: Indiana
- County: Martin
- Township: Perry
- Founded: 1940
- Named for: William M. Crane

Area
  - Total: 0.12 sq mi (0.31 km^{2})
  - Land: 0.12 sq mi (0.31 km^{2})
  - Water: 0 sq mi (0.00 km^{2})
- Elevation: 597 ft (182 m)

Population (2020)
  - Total: 166
  - Density: 1,379.1/sq mi (532.46/km^{2})
- Time zone: UTC-5 (Eastern (EST))
  - Summer (DST): UTC-5 (EST)
- ZIP code: 47522
- Area codes: 812 and 930
- FIPS code: 18-15652
- GNIS feature ID: 2396667

Crane is a town in Perry Township, Martin County, in the U.S. state of Indiana. The population was 166 at the 2020 census. The community is adjacent to the Naval Surface Warfare Center Crane Division.

== History ==
Crane was originally known as "Burns City Ammunition Depot", and under the latter name was founded in 1940. In 1943, the community was renamed "Crane", in honor of William M. Crane, first chief of the Navy Bureau of Ordnance.

== Geography ==
Crane is located in the northwest corner of Martin County. The western border of the town follows the Daviess County line. The Naval Surface Warfare Center Crane Division occupies the areas east of Crane (a visitor center lies within the town). Indiana State Road 558 passes through the southern part of Crane, connecting the town with U.S. Route 231 to the west. Interstate 69 passes just north of Crane.

According to the U.S. Census Bureau, Crane has a total area of 0.12 square miles (0.31 km^{2}), all of it recorded as land. Culpepper Branch has its headwaters in Crane and flows southeast to First Creek, which turns and flows west to join the White River at Newberry.

== Demographics ==
Historical population
Census	Pop.	Note	%±
1970	339		—
1980	297		−12.4%
1990	216		−27.3%
2000	203		−6.0%
2010	184		−9.4%
2020	166		−9.8%
U.S. Decennial Census

=== 2010 census ===
As of the census of 2010, there were 184 people, 80 households, and 43 families living in the town. The population density was 1,533.3 inhabitants per square mile (592.0/km^{2}). There were 109 housing units at an average density of 908.3 per square mile (350.7/km^{2}). The racial makeup of the town was 96.7% White and 3.3% Asian.

There were 80 households, of which 27.5% had children under the age of 18 living with them, 36.3% were married couples living together, 11.3% had a female householder with no husband present, 6.3% had a male householder with no wife present, and 46.3% were non-families. 43.8% of all households were made up of individuals, and 13.8% had someone living alone who was 65 years of age or older. The average household size was 2.30 and the average family size was 3.12.

The median age in the town was 39.4 years. 26.1% of residents were under the age of 18; 5.4% were between the ages of 18 and 24; 25.5% were from 25 to 44; 26.7% were from 45 to 64; and 16.3% were 65 years of age or older. The gender makeup of the town was 48.4% male and 51.6% female.

=== 2000 census ===
As of the census of 2000, there were 203 people, 89 households, and 54 families living in the town. The population density was 1,705.4 inhabitants per square mile (658.5/km^{2}). There were 112 housing units at an average density of 940.9 per square mile (363.3/km^{2}). The racial makeup of the town was 97.04% White, 0.49% Asian, and 2.46% from two or more races. Hispanic or Latino of any race were 0.49% of the population.

There were 89 households, out of which 24.7% had children under the age of 18 living with them, 49.4% were married couples living together, 6.7% had a female householder with no husband present, and 39.3% were non-families. 31.5% of all households were made up of individuals, and 12.4% had someone living alone who was 65 years of age or older. The average household size was 2.28 and the average family size was 2.93.

In the town, the population was spread out, with 27.1% under the age of 18, 2.0% from 18 to 24, 21.2% from 25 to 44, 28.6% from 45 to 64, and 21.2% who were 65 years of age or older. The median age was 44 years. For every 100 females, there were 89.7 males. For every 100 females age 18 and over, there were 92.2 males.

The median income for a household in the town was $36,250, and the median income for a family was $45,625. Males had a median income of $33,750 versus $27,500 for females. The per capita income for the town was $16,853. About 9.6% of families and 13.6% of the population were below the poverty line, including 26.9% of those under the age of eighteen and 3.0% of those 65 or over.

== Numbered highways ==
- SR 558
- US 231, 0.5 miles (0.8 km) west
- SR 45, 0.5 miles (0.8 km) west
- I-69, 2 miles (3 km) north
- SR 58, 2 miles (3 km) north
