= Indiana State Road 240 =

Highway in Indiana

State Road 240
- SR 240 highlighted in red

Route information
- Maintained by INDOT
- Length: 10.172 mi (16.370 km)

Major junctions
- West end: US 231 at Greencastle
- East end: SR 75 near Stilesville

Location
- Country: United States
- State: Indiana
- Counties: Putnam, Hendricks

Highway system
- Indiana State Highway System; Interstate; US; State; Scenic
← SR 238	→ SR 241

State Road 240 in the U.S. state of Indiana is a short connector route in located in eastern Putnam County.

== Route description ==
State Road 240 begins in Greencastle at U.S. Route 231 and travels east, leaving the Greencastle city limits after about 3 miles. At mile 9.18 it hits the county line between Putnam and Hendricks counties, and travels along this line until it reaches State Road 75 just north of its intersection with U.S. Route 40. This road provides a direct route from Greencastle toward Indianapolis.

== Major intersections ==
The entire route is in Putnam County.

Location	mi	km	Destinations	Notes
Greencastle	0.000	0.000	US 231; Veterans Memorial Highway	Western terminus of SR 240; roadway continues west as Veterans Memorial Highway
Jefferson Township	10.172	16.370	SR 75 – Coatesville, Jamestown	Eastern terminus of SR 240; roadway continues east as 200S
1.000 mi = 1.609 km; 1.000 km = 0.621 mi

== History ==
Prior to the construction of Veterans' Memorial Highway, State Road 240 followed Indianapolis Road into Greencastle. When Indianapolis Road terminated at East Washington Street, State Road 240 followed Washington Street towards downtown Greencastle, where it terminated at that road's junction with US 231 (Bloomington Street).
