= Indiana State Road 445 =

State highway in Indiana, United States

State Road 445
- SR 445 highlighted in red

Route information
- Maintained by INDOT
- Length: 2.807 mi (4.517 km)

Major junctions
- West end: SR 54 east of Bloomfield
- SR 45 East of Cincinnati
- East end: I-69 near Cincinnati

Location
- Country: United States
- State: Indiana
- Counties: Greene

Highway system
- Indiana State Highway System; Interstate; US; State; Scenic
← SR 441	→ SR 446

State Road 445 (SR 445) is a short connector route, just 2.807 miles (4.517 km) long, in eastern Greene County, Indiana, just north of the small town of Cincinnati. It connects SR 54, SR 45, and I-69 (Exit 104).

== Route description ==
SR 445 begins at SR 54 with a flashing light, near the Greene County Inn (also a cafe). It then runs east to a four-way intersection where it meets SR 45. It then continues east, ending at its eastern terminus at exit 104 on Interstate 69 (I-69).

== History ==
SR 445's original eastern terminus was a stop sign with SR 45. On December 9, 2015, I-69 opened, and SR 445 was extended east to I-69 Exit 104.

== Major intersections ==
The entire route is in Center Township, Greene County.

mi	km	Destinations	Notes
0.000	0.000	SR 54 – Bloomfield	Western terminus of SR 445
1.394	2.243	SR 45 – Bloomington	Former eastern terminus of SR 445
2.807	4.517	I-69 – Evansville, Indianapolis	Exit 104; eastern terminus of SR 445
1.000 mi = 1.609 km; 1.000 km = 0.621 mi
