= Owensburg, Indiana =

- Census-designated place
- Location of Owensburg in Greene County, Indiana.

- Location within Indiana Location within the United States
- Coordinates: 38°55′20″N 86°44′40″W
- Country: United States
- State: Indiana
- County: Greene
- Township: Jackson

Area
  - Total: 5.93 sq mi (15.35 km^{2})
  - Land: 5.92 sq mi (15.33 km^{2})
  - Water: 0.0077 sq mi (0.02 km^{2})
- Elevation: 643 ft (196 m)

Population (2020)
  - Total: 402
  - Density: 67.9/sq mi (26.22/km^{2})
- ZIP code: 47453
- FIPS code: 18-57510
- GNIS feature ID: 2583463

Owensburg is an unincorporated community and census-designated place (CDP) in Jackson Township, Greene County, Indiana, United States. It was named in honor of the Owens family of early settlers. As of the 2020 census, Owensburg had a population of 402.

== Geography ==
Owensburg is located in southeastern Greene County. The southern border of the CDP follows the Martin County line, and the western edge of the CDP follows Indiana State Road 45. State Road 58 passes through the center of Owensburg, leading east 17 miles (27 km) to Bedford and west with State Road 45 11 miles (18 km) to Interstate 69 and U.S. Route 231 near Scotland. State Road 45 leads north from Owensburg 4 miles (6 km) to Interstate 69 and 25 miles (40 km) to Bloomington.

According to the U.S. Census Bureau, the Owensburg CDP has a total area of 5.9 square miles (15.4 km^{2}), of which 0.01 square miles (0.02 km^{2}), or 0.13%, is water. The center of Owensburg is in the valley of Town Branch, which flows east to Indian Creek, a tributary of East Fork of the White River and part of the Wabash River watershed.

== Demographics ==
Historical population
Census	Pop.	Note	%±
2020	402		—
U.S. Decennial Census
