= U.S. Route 231 in Indiana =

Highway in Indiana

U.S. Route 231
- US 231 highlighted in red

Route information
- Maintained by INDOT
- Length: 284.277 mi (457.499 km)
- Existed: August 22, 1952–present

Major junctions
- South end: US 231 at the Kentucky state line in Rockport
- I-64 in Dale; US 50 / US 150 in Loogootee; I-69 near Crane; I-70 near Cloverdale; US 40 near Putnamville; I-74 near Crawfordsville; US 52 in Lafayette; I-65 in Crown Point
- North end: US 41 in St. John

Location
- Country: United States
- State: Indiana
- Counties: Spencer, Dubois, Martin, Daviess, Greene, Owen, Putnam, Montgomery, Tippecanoe, White, Jasper, Porter, Lake

Highway system
- United States Numbered Highway System; List; Special; Divided; Indiana State Highway System; Interstate; US; State; Scenic
← SR 229	→ SR 232

U.S. Route 231 (US 231) is the longest numbered highway in Indiana, covering over 284 miles (457 km). It is a main north–south highway in the western part of the state. The southern terminus of US 231 in Indiana is at the Kentucky state line and the northern terminus is at US 41 just south of St. John. The highway is a mixture of expressway and two-lane roadway. The expressway portions exist mainly in southern Indiana and around the Lafayette-West Lafayette area, with the rest mainly being two lanes.

== Route description ==
US 231 is maintained by the Indiana Department of Transportation (INDOT) like all other U.S. Highways in the state. The department tracks the traffic volumes along all state highways as a part of its maintenance responsibilities using a metric called average annual daily traffic (AADT). This measurement is a calculation of the traffic level along a segment of roadway for any day of the year. In 2010, INDOT calculated that the section of US 231 with the lowest average daily traffic levels – with 1,100 vehicles and 180 commercial vehicles – was from US 52 to I–65. The peak traffic volumes on US 231 was 27,990 vehicles and 1,950 commercial vehicles AADT along the section concurrent with US 52.

=== Southern Indiana ===
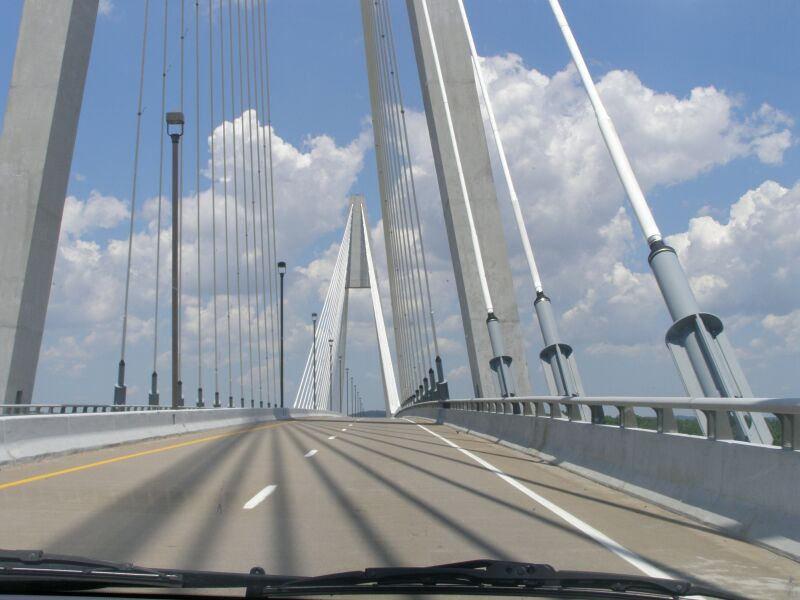
The William H. Natcher Bridge over the Ohio River between Kentucky and Indiana

US 231 enters Indiana on the William H. Natcher Bridge over the Ohio River from Kentucky. The road enters as a four–lane divided highway and immediately has a folded diamond interchange (also called a "parclo" interchange) with State Road 66 (SR 66). The highway heads north passing a large, coal fired power plant (Rockport Generating Station) and through farmland towards Chrisney; the expressway then intersects with SR 70. The route turns northeast, passing through woods, just south of Lincoln State Park. The road turns north having an interchange with SR 162; this exit allows access to the State Park, as well as the Holiday World & Splashin' Safari theme park, a few miles to the east.

The expressway then turns northwest and skirts the south and west sides of Dale. On the south side of town, the roadway intersects SR 62; this is the old route of US 231, which joins the expressway for a brief period before turning east at the junction with SR 68. I–64 is a little more than a mile north from this point, with its interchange just south of the end of the expressway.

U.S. 231 enters Dubois County, crossing into the Eastern Time Zone. From this point northward through the remainder of Southern Indiana, the highway will remain mostly a rural two-lane road.

US 231 heads towards Huntingburg, passing through rural farmland. The highway enters Huntingburg from the south, passing through residential areas. The route has a traffic light in downtown Huntingburg with SR 64. North of downtown Huntingburg, the road passes through commercial properties, before leaving town. The highway then heads north towards Jasper, passing by a mix of both farmland and woodland. US 231 enters Jasper from the south, passing by commercial lots. West of downtown Jasper, the route begins a concurrency with SR 56, with both routes heading east. The concurrency enters downtown and has a traffic light at the northern terminus of SR 164. That is intersection US 231 and SR 56 turn towards the north. The two highways head north into residential areas. The road leaves Jasper heading northeastward toward Loogootee. In Haysville, the concurrency with SR 56 ends. US 231 heads north-northeast from SR 54, before turning more northward. The highway enters Loogootee and begins a concurrency with both U.S. Route 50 (US 50) and US 150. The concurrency travels due north, then turns northeast and enters downtown Loogootee. In downtown, the concurrency ends, with US 50 and US 150 heading east and US 231 heading northwest. The highway then heads north towards Bloomfield, passing the Naval Surface Warfare Center Crane Division. It then crosses I-69.

The route enters Bloomfield from the south, beginning a concurrency with SR 54 in downtown. This intersection is also the southern terminus of SR 157. US 231 and SR 54 head due west after about 4 miles (6.4 km), after which SR 54 keeps heading due west and US 231 turns due north. This intersection is the northern terminus of SR 57. US 231 then heads north for about 4 miles (6.4 km) until SR 67. The two routes head northeast heading towards Spencer, along the banks of the White River. The highway turns towards the north away from the river and the concurrency ends. SR 67 heads northeast again and US 231 heads northwest. The road then travels towards Cloverdale, passing through an intersection with SR 42. The route enters Cloverdale passing by a mix of commercial and residential properties. On the north side of Cloverdale, the highway becomes a four-lane divided highway, with an interchange at I–70.

=== Northern Indiana ===
North of I–70, US 231 narrows to a two-lane highway, heading towards the northwest. The route has a traffic light at US 40, south of Greencastle. The highway enters Greencastle from the southeast and begins to turn north, passing DePauw University to the west. In downtown Greencastle, the highway has a traffic light with the western terminus of SR 240. US 231 leaves Greencastle heading further north for Crawfordsville, passing through a traffic light at US 36, a brief concurrency with SR 236, and an intersection with SR 234. On the south side of Crawfordsville, the route becomes a four-lane undivided highway, passing through commercial development. The road then heads toward downtown Crawfordsville, and begins a concurrency with both SR 32 and SR 47. The concurrency passes Wabash College and has an intersection with US 136. At this intersection, the concurrency with SR 32 and SR 47 turns east onto US 136. US 231 becomes a four-lane divided highway north of US 136, heading through the north side of Crawfordsville. Through the north side of Crawfordsville, the road passes through mainly residential land, with a few commercial properties near the interchange with I–74.

North of I–74, the road returns to a two–lane rural highway and heads north for Lafayette. On the way to Lafayette, the route passes through rural farmland, paralleling a CSX rail line. The road enters Lafayette and becomes a four-lane divided highway as it runs through a mix of farmland and residential areas. The highway has a traffic light at SR 25 and US 52. As of 2013, the route crosses the Wabash River and heads for West Lafayette, where it runs along the south and west edges of the Purdue campus. US 231 continues north for a few miles, then turns westbound. It passes a few commercial properties, and then a few miles west, US 231 leaves the concurrency, while US 52 continues northwest and US 231 heads due north.

North of US 52, the highway becomes a two-lane rural highway passing through farmland. US 231 has an interchange with I–65; this is the first of four interchanges with I–65. The route begins a concurrency with US 24 in Wolcott. The two highways head north through Wolcott and then turn due west. After Wolcott, the concurrency crosses into Jasper County and into the Central Time Zone. The two routes have an interchange at I–65 east of Remington. In Remington, the concurrency ends, with US 24 continuing due west and US 231 heading due north again. The road then enters Rensselaer, heads north and turns northeast, with a traffic light at SR 114. North of the traffic light, the road makes a sharp turn and heads northwest. North of Rensselaer, the route turns north once again, heading towards SR 10. At SR 10, US 231 turns due west, concurrent with the state road. After 2.5 miles (4.0 km), the concurrency ends, with SR 10 traveling south and US 231 continuing north. The highway then enters Porter County on a bridge over the Kankakee River.

North of the Kankakee River, the route begins a concurrency with SR 2 at a four-way stop south of Hebron. The concurrency enters Hebron from the south, passing mainly residential areas. The concurrency has an intersection with the western terminus of SR 8 at the main intersection in downtown. North of downtown, the concurrency with SR 2 ends with SR 2 heading due north and US 231 heading northwest. The road leaves Hebron, passing more residential properties and heading towards Crown Point. On the southeast side of Crown Point, the route has its last interchange with I–65. After I–65, the road has an intersection with SR 55. Passing through the southeast side of Crown Point, the road is lined with housing additions on both sides. The road then begins a concurrency with SR 55 and the two highways head for downtown Crown Point. In downtown Crown Point, the routes go around the county courthouse on one-way streets. The concurrency ends when the state road heads due north. US 231 then leaves Crown Point, heading towards its northern terminus on the south side of St. John. The route turns west for the last few miles to meet US 41. US 231 meets US 41 at an intersection controlled by a traffic light.

== History ==
=== Before US 231 ===
U.S. Route 152
- Location: Lafayette–St. John
- Existed: February 1935–1938

Between 1918 and 1926, US 231 was signed SR 18 from Rockport to Old SR 4 and then followed Old SR 4 to Jasper. From Jasper to Bloomfield, the route consisted of unimproved county roads. From Bloomfield to Switz City, the future US 231 followed Old SR 30. North of Switz City, the road was SR 12, which eventually became SR 67. From Jasper to Lafayette, the road was numbered as SR 32. Where the future US 231 followed SR 29, the route became what is now US 52. From Wolcott to Remington, the route followed SR 7. North of Remington, the road was numbered SR 8 until reaching Hebron. From Hebron to the current terminus was an unimproved county road. This system was changed in 1926 when the U.S. Highways were created.

The current number system in Indiana was put into place in 1926. The route that would become US 231 was signed as SR 45 from Rockport to SR 58 in Scotland. From Scotland to Bloomfield, it was an unimproved county road. From Bloomfield to Spencer, the future US 231 was given the same number that the route is concurrent with today. North of Spencer to Lafayette it was numbered SR 43. The route that US 231 follows today along US 52 was the same. The section of US 231 north of US 52 to US 41 was signed as US 152. The US 152 designation was used between February 1935 and 1938; in 1938 US 152 was decommissioned. The road then went back to state road numbers; this lasted until 1952 when US 231 was commissioned and signs installed.

=== As US 231 ===
US 231 was first signed in Indiana in 1954; the whole length of US 231 was two-lanes. In Southern Indiana, the road has been widened from a two-lane surface road to a four-lane divided expressway. The expressway construction began in 2002 with a new bridge over the Ohio River; the state designated the old bridge near Owensboro, KY as SR 161. When the bridge was completed, traffic had to exit the expressway at the first exit on to SR 66. The expressway was built north towards Dale on all new terrain, with some of the old highway being signed as SR 161, SR 62, and the rest becoming county roads. US 231 was moved onto the expressway on March 15, 2011. In Northern Indiana, a new routing of US 231 around the south and west sides of the Lafayette/West Lafayette area opened September 13, 2013. Previously, US 231 entered downtown Lafayette from the south on 4th Street, passed over the Wabash River on the Harrison Bridge, then continued north and northwest in West Lafayette on Northwestern Avenue passing Purdue University, until merging with US 52.

== Future ==
A project is planned that will possibly put US 231 on a four-lane divided highway around Huntingburg and Jasper in the southern part of the state. However, the final routing has not been determined as of June 2022.

Another project for US 231 is planned in Tippecanoe County, just northwest of West Lafayette. This road will be a four-lane divided highway, connecting the section of highway built in 2013 to I-65 and SR 43.There is no exact time for when this will be built.

Indiana has invested in a strip of "electrified highway that could charge even the largest vehicles as they drive over it" on US 231. Research on the project is being conducted by Purdue University's Steve Pekarek, who says the technology could make a transition to electric vehicles more attractive. This segment of highway is in West Lafayette.

== Major intersections ==
County	Location	mi	km	Destinations	Notes
Daviess		0.000	0.000	US 231 south – Owensboro	Kentucky state line
Ohio River		0.000	0.000	William H. Natcher Bridge	
Spencer	Ohio Township	0.251	0.404	SR 66 – Tell City, Rockport, Evansville	Interchange
Spencer	Grass Township	7.122	11.462	SR 70 east	Western terminus of SR 70
Spencer	Carter–Clay township line	15.885– 15.893	25.564– 25.577	SR 162 – Gentryville, Santa Claus	Interchange
Spencer	Dale	18.745	30.167	SR 62 west – Gentryville	South end of SR 62 concurrency; intersection is a J-turn
Spencer	Dale	19.822	31.900	SR 62 east / SR 68 west – Dale	North end of SR 62 concurrency; intersection is a J-turn
Spencer	Dale	21.350– 22.131	34.359– 35.616	I-64–St. Louis, Louisville	Interchange
Dubois	Huntingburg	29.279	47.120	SR 64 – Oakland City, Marengo	
Dubois	Jasper	33.938	54.618	SR 162 south – Ferdinand	Northern terminus of SR 162
Dubois	Jasper	35.906	57.785	SR 56 west – Petersburg	Southern end of SR 56 concurrency
Dubois	Jasper	36.286	58.397	SR 164 east – Ferdinand	Western terminus of SR 164
Dubois	Haysville	43.122	69.398	SR 56 east – French Lick	Northern end of SR 56 concurrency
Martin	Loogootee	56.410	90.783	US 50 west / US 150 west – Washington	Southern end of US 50/US 150 concurrency
Martin	Loogootee	56.894	91.562	US 50 east / US 150 east – Shoals	Northern end of US 50/US 150 concurrency
Daviess	Madison Township	67.092	107.974	SR 645 east – Burns City	Western terminus of SR 645
Daviess	Madison Township	69.129	111.252	SR 58 west – Odon	Southern end of SR 58 concurrency
Daviess	Madison Township	72.448	116.594	SR 558 east – NSA Crane	Western terminus of SR 558
Greene	Taylor Township	73.713	118.630	SR 45 north / SR 58 east – Bloomington, Bedford	Southern terminus of SR 45; northern end of SR 58 concurrency
Greene	Taylor Township	73.859– 73.911	118.865– 118.948	I-69 – Evansville, Indianapolis	I-69 exit 87
Greene	Bloomfield	81.610	131.339	SR 54 east / SR 157 north – Bloomington	Eastern end of SR 54 concurrency; southern terminus of SR 157
Greene	Fairplay Township	85.635	137.816	SR 54 east / SR 57 south – Newberry, Switz City	Western end of SR 54 concurrency
Greene	Fairplay Township	88.926	143.113	SR 57 south / SR 67 south – Vincennes	Southern end of SR 67 concurrency; north end of SR 57
Greene	Worthington	92.204	148.388	SR 157 south	Southern end of SR 157 concurrency
Greene	Worthington	92.250	148.462	SR 157 north	Northern end of SR 157 concurrency
Owen	Spencer	109.597	176.379	SR 46 west – Terre Haute	Western end of SR 46 concurrency
Owen	Spencer	110.461	177.770	SR 46 east – Bloomington	Eastern end of SR 46 concurrency
Owen	Montgomery Township	115.842	186.430	SR 67 north – Indianapolis	Northern end of SR 67 concurrency
Putnam	Cloverdale	126.540	203.646	SR 42 – Mooresville, Lieber State Recreation Area	
Putnam	Cloverdale	128.881– 129.031	207.414– 207.655	I-70 – Indianapolis, St. Louis	
Putnam	Warren Township	132.633	213.452	US 40 – Terre Haute, Indianapolis	
Putnam	Greencastle	136.640	219.901	SR 240 east	Western terminus of SR 240
Putnam	Monroe Township	146.261	235.384	US 36 – Danville, Rockville, Raccoon State Recreation Area	
Putnam	Franklin–Russell township line	151.924	244.498	SR 236 west – Russellville, Marshall	Southern end of SR 236 concurrency
Putnam	Franklin–Russell township line	152.430	245.312	SR 236 east – Roachdale	Northern end of SR 236 concurrency
Montgomery	Scott Township	157.609	253.647	SR 234 – Shades State Park, Ladoga	
Montgomery	Crawfordsville	164.601	264.900	SR 32 west / SR 47 south	Southern end of SR 32/SR 47 concurrency
Montgomery	Crawfordsville	165.839	266.892	US 136 / SR 32 east / SR 47 north	Northern end of SR 32/SR 47 concurrency
Montgomery	Crawfordsville	168.425– 168.650	271.054– 271.416	I-74 – Indianapolis	Exit 34 on I-74
Tippecanoe	Randolph Township	181.023	291.328	SR 28 – Frankfort, Attica	
Tippecanoe	Lafayette	190.110	305.952	US 52 east / SR 25 south	South end of US 52 concurrency; north end of southern segment of SR 25
Tippecanoe	Lafayette	193.416	311.273	SR 26 west	East end of western segment of SR 26
Tippecanoe	Lafayette	196.652	316.481	Sagamore Parkway	
Tippecanoe	Shelby Township	200.655	322.923	US 52 west	Western end of US 52 concurrency
White	Round Grove Township	209.742	337.547	SR 18 – Fowler, Brookston	
White	West Point Township	214.025– 214.224	344.440– 344.760	I-65 – Indianapolis, Chicago	
White	Wolcott	219.948	353.972	US 24 east – Monticello	Eastern end of US 24 concurrency
Jasper	Carpenter Township	224.805– 224.978	361.789– 362.067	I-65 – Indianapolis, Chicago	
Jasper	Remington	226.673	364.795	US 24 west – Kentland	Western end of US 24 concurrency
Jasper	Carpenter Township	229.592– 229.786	369.493– 369.805	I-65 – Indianapolis, Chicago	
Jasper	Jordan Township	233.627	375.986	SR 16 – Monon, Brook	
Jasper	Rensselaer	238.618	384.018	SR 114 to I-65	
Jasper	Union Township	244.959	394.223	SR 14 – Parr, Enos, Winamac	
Jasper	Walker Township	253.041	407.230	SR 110 west – Roselawn	Eastern terminus of the western section of SR 110
Jasper	Walker Township	256.035	412.048	SR 10 east – Wheatland	Eastern end of SR 10 concurrency
Jasper	Demotte	258.400– 258.590	415.854– 416.160	SR 10 west – Roselawn	Western end of SR 10 concurrency
Porter	Boone Township	265.462	427.220	SR 2 west – Lowell	Southern end of SR 2 concurrency
Porter	Hebron	267.488	430.480	SR 8 east	Western terminus of SR 8
Porter	Hebron	267.642	430.728	SR 2 east – Valparaiso	Northern end of SR 2 concurrency
Lake	Crown Point	275.738– 275.986	443.757– 444.156	I-65 – Indianapolis, Gary	
Lake	Crown Point	276.674	445.264	SR 53 north – Merrillville	Southern terminus of SR 53
Lake	Crown Point	278.116	447.584	SR 55 south	Eastern end of SR 55 concurrency
Lake	Crown Point	278.714	448.547	SR 55 north – Gary	Western end of SR 55 concurrency
Lake	St. John	284.277	457.499	US 41 – Terre Haute, Hammond	Northern terminus of US 231
1.000 mi = 1.609 km; 1.000 km = 0.621 mi: Concurrency terminus

== See also ==
U.S. Route 231
Previous state: Kentucky	Indiana	Next state: Terminus
