= Scotland, Indiana =

- Census-designated place
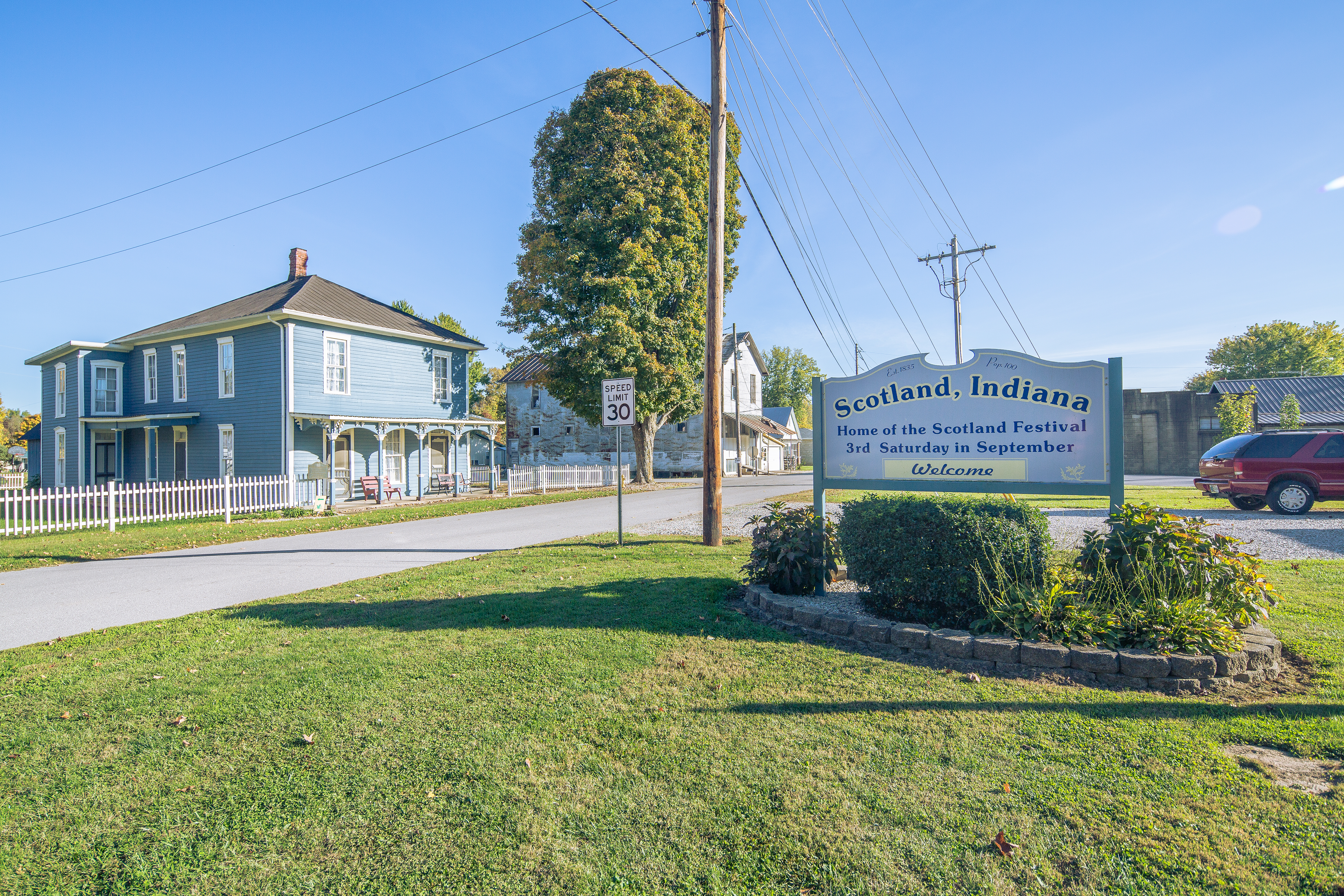

- Location of Scotland in Greene County, Indiana.

- Location within Indiana Location within the United States
- Coordinates: 38°54′46″N 86°54′14″W
- Country: United States
- State: Indiana
- County: Greene
- Township: Taylor

Area
  - Total: 0.58 sq mi (1.49 km^{2})
  - Land: 0.58 sq mi (1.49 km^{2})
  - Water: 0 sq mi (0.00 km^{2})
- Elevation: 614 ft (187 m)

Population (2020)
  - Total: 98
  - Density: 170.0/sq mi (65.65/km^{2})
- ZIP code: 47424
- FIPS code: 18-68382
- GNIS feature ID: 2583469

Scotland is an unincorporated community and census-designated place (CDP) in Taylor Township, Greene County, Indiana, United States. As of the 2020 census, Scotland had a population of 98.

== History ==
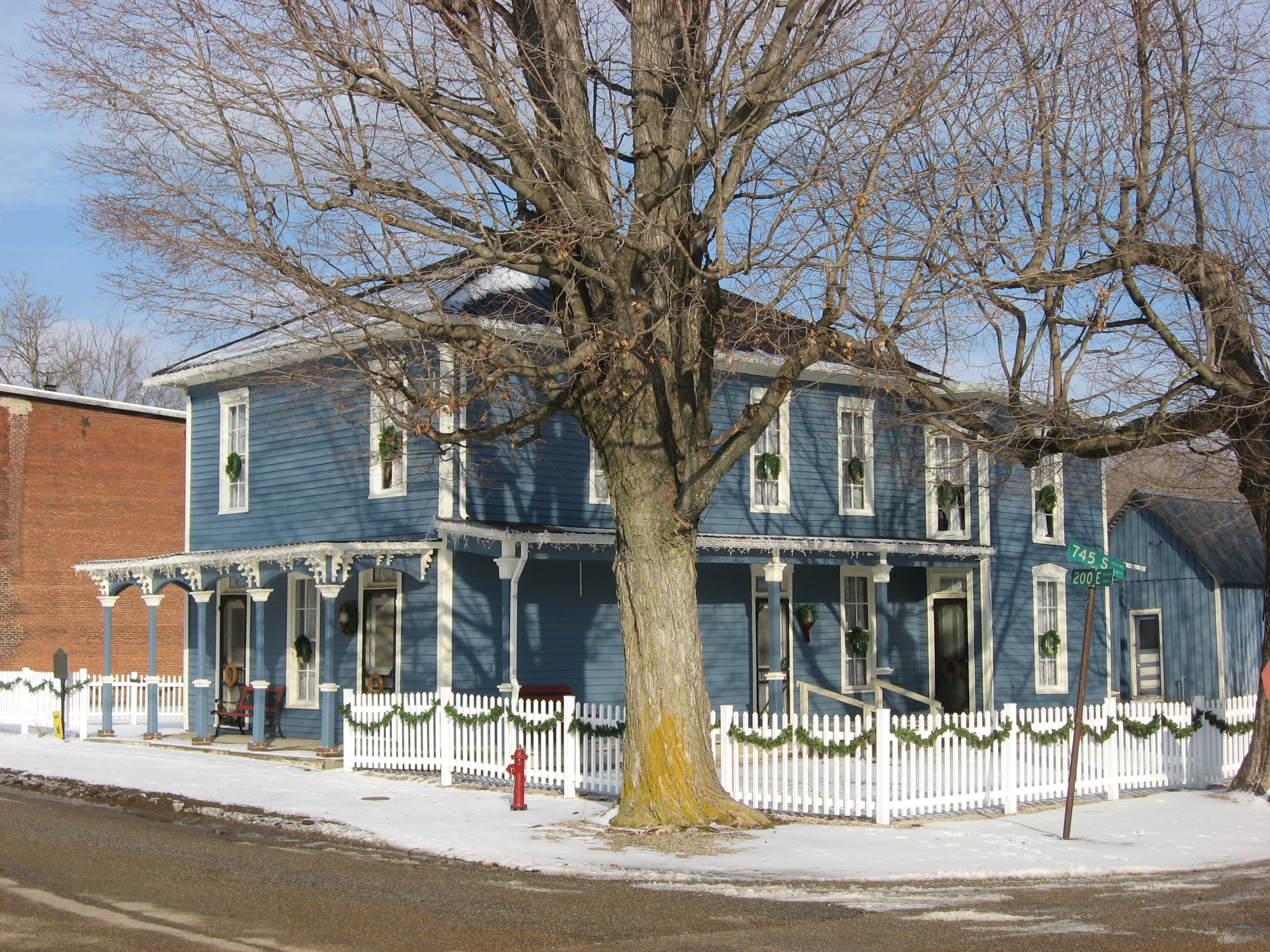
The Scotland Hotel, a community landmark

The Scotland post office was established in 1837. A majority of the early settlers were natives of the country of Scotland.

The Scotland Hotel was listed on the National Register of Historic Places in 1993.

== Geography ==
Scotland is located in southern Greene County. The southern border of the CDP follows the Martin and Daviess county lines. State Roads 45 and 58 pass just north of the community and intersect U.S. Route 231 at Interstate 69 1 mile (1.6 km) west of the community. Owensburg is 10 miles (16 km) to the east, Bloomfield (the Greene County seat) is 9 miles (14 km) to the north, and Loogootee is 17 miles (27 km) to the south. I-69 leads northeast 33 miles (53 km) to Bloomington and southwest 28 miles (45 km) to Washington.

According to the U.S. Census Bureau, the Scotland CDP has a total area of 0.58 square miles (1.5 km^{2}), all of it land. It is situated on high ground to the south of Doans Creek, a west-flowing tributary of the White River and part of the Wabash River watershed.

== Demographics ==
Historical population
Census	Pop.	Note	%±
2020	98		—
U.S. Decennial Census

== Education ==
It is in the Bloomfield School District.
