= Indiana State Road 45 =

Highway in Indiana

State Road 45
- Frank McCloskey Highway
- SR 45 highlighted in red

Route information
- Maintained by INDOT
- Length: 55.65 mi (89.56 km)
- Existed: October 1, 1926–present

Major junctions
- South end: US 231 / SR 58 near Crane
- I-69 near Crane; I-69 at Bloomington
- North end: SR 135 at Beanblossom

Location
- Country: United States
- State: Indiana

Highway system
- Indiana State Highway System; Interstate; US; State; Scenic
← SR 44	→ SR 46

State Road 45 is a state route from Bean Blossom, Indiana, to Scotland, Indiana, in the southern half of the state.

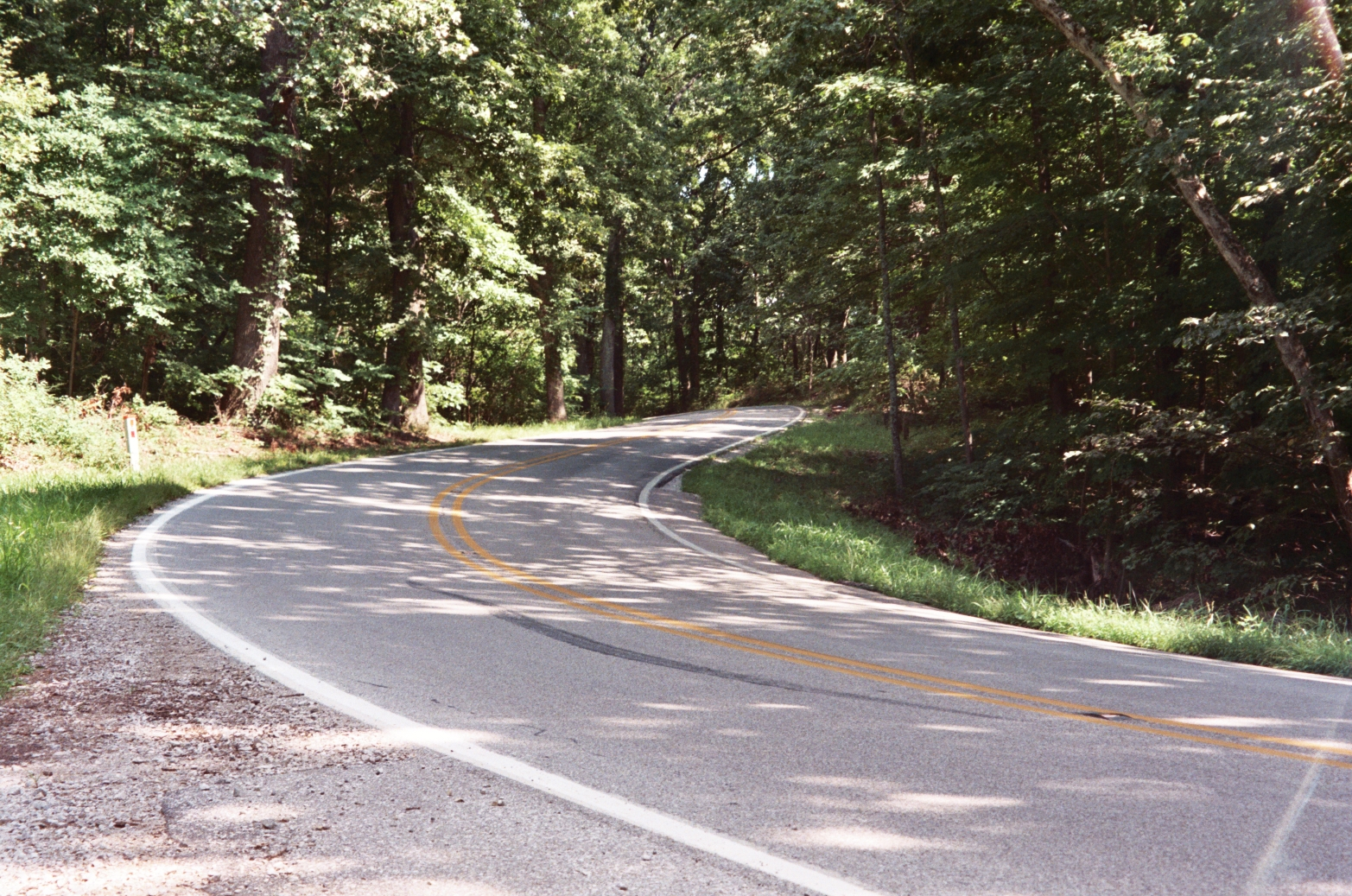
State Road 45 in Brown County

== Route description ==
From Bean Blossom and through Brown County, State Road 45 is a narrow, shoulderless two-lane road that passes between the Morgan-Monroe State Forest and the Yellowwood State Forest.

As the road passes into Monroe County, the woods disappear and farms and homes begin to line the road. The road remains hilly and curvy until it reaches Bloomington, where it bypasses the city concurrent with State Road 46 and then Interstate 69. West of Bloomington, shoulders appear on State Road 45 and its two lanes become wider. The road meanders with the rolling terrain interchanging again with Interstate 69 until it meets and overlaps State Road 58, after which it is straight and flat until its terminus at US 231.

== History ==
What would eventually become State Road (S.R.) 45 had its origins in the early state highway system. Roads 4 (later changed to 16) and 18 connected Rockport to Haysville via Jasper. This would become, in the October 1, 1926 statewide renumbering, the first segment of State Road 45.

By 1932, S.R. 45 was being extended north from Haysville to Loogootee, and a separate segment between Cincinnati in Greene County and Bloomington had also been completed. By 1940, the entire route from Rockport to Bloomington was complete, but when the Crane Naval Ammunition Depot was commissioned in 1941, the portion of the highway between Burns City and Cincinnati had to be rerouted to the west perimeter of the installation.

When U.S. 231 was extended north through Indiana in 1953, it was routed over S.R. 45 from Rockport to the S.R. 58 junction near Scotland. However, as with S.R. 43 from Spencer to Lafayette, which also carried U.S. 231, the Indiana State Highway Department (now INDOT) deleted much of the co-signed state route by 1979.

The deletion left the current segment along with a short, 5-mile section from Patronville to Rockport that acted as a connector to then-U.S. 231 (now State Road 161) and Owensboro, Kentucky. This southern section was decommissioned and turned over to the control of the city of Rockport (within the city limits) and Spencer County (outside of Rockport) in March 2001, about a year before U.S. 231 was rerouted onto the William H. Natcher Bridge.

The segment of S.R. 45 from Scotland to Bloomington was named for the late former Bloomington mayor and Indiana 8th District Congressman Frank X. McCloskey in 2004.

A major construction project to widen the road to four lanes in Bloomington was completed in November 2012.

== Major intersections ==
County	Location	mi	km	Destinations	Notes
Greene	Scotland	0.00	0.00	US 231 / SR 58 west to I-69 – Loogootee, Elnora, Bloomfield	Southern end of SR 45; southern end of SR 58 concurrency; I-69 Exit 87
Greene	Owensburg	9.07	14.60	SR 58 east – Bedford	Northern end of SR 58 concurrency
Greene	Jackson Township			I-69 – Evansville, Indianapolis	I-69 exit 98 opened December 9, 2015
Greene	Cincinnati	16.56	26.65	SR 54 east – Bedford	Southern end of SR 54 concurrency
Greene	Cincinnati	16.70	26.88	SR 54 west – Bloomfield	Northern end of SR 54 concurrency
Greene	Cincinnati	18.58	29.90	SR 445	Former northern terminus of SR 445
Monroe	Bloomington	29.82	47.99	I-69 south – Evansville	Southern end of concurrency with I-69
Monroe	Bloomington			SR 48 west	Eastern terminus of SR 48
Monroe	Bloomington	32.88	52.92	I-69 north – Indianapolis SR 46 west – Spencer	Northern end of I-69 concurrency; southern end of SR 46 concurrency
Monroe	Bloomington	36.23	58.31	SR 46 east – Columbus	Northern terminus of SR 46 concurrency
Brown	Beanblossom	55.65	89.56	SR 135 – Nashville, Morgantown	Northern terminus of SR 45
1.000 mi = 1.609 km; 1.000 km = 0.621 mi: Concurrency terminus
