= Shakamak State Park =

State park in Indiana, United States

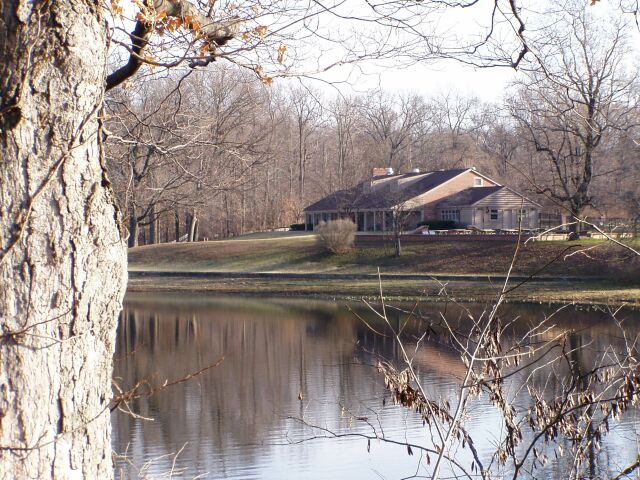
- The Nature Center on the west side of the lake
- Interactive map of Shakamak State Park
- Location: Clay, Greene, and Sullivan County, Indiana, United States
- Nearest city: Jasonville, Indiana
- Area: 1,766 acres (7.15 km^{2})
- Established: 1929
- Visitors: 232,660 (in 2018–2019)
- Governing body: Indiana Department of Natural Resources
- Website: www.in.gov/dnr/parklake/2969.htm
- Shakamak State Park Historic District
- U.S. National Register of Historic Places
- U.S. Historic district
- Location within Clay County, Indiana Location within Indiana Location within the United States
- Nearest city: Jasonville, Indiana
- Coordinates: 39°10′12″N 87°14′24″W
- Area: 685 acres (277 ha)
- Built by: CCC; WPA
- Architectural style: Park Rustic
- MPS: New Deal Resources on Indiana State Lands MPS
- NRHP reference No.: 00000199
- Added to NRHP: March 15, 2000

Shakamak State Park is a state park in Indiana, United States. It is located 30 miles (48 km) southeast of Terre Haute, Indiana.

Shakamak's main attraction is its fishing. Shakamak has several outdoor recreational activities such as swimming, hiking, paddle boating, row boating, camping, fishing. The park offers rentals for cabins and campsites and is located just 3 miles (4.8 km) from Jasonville, Indiana. The park receives about 230,000 visitors annually.

== History ==
Shakamak State Park was dedicated on September 3, 1928. The land was donated for a state park from the counties of Clay, Greene and Sullivan. The name "Shakamak" was chosen by the park's founders. The word is said to mean "river of the long fish" in the language of either the Delaware (Lenape) or Kickapoo Indians, and was said to be used by them to describe the nearby Eel River. The park founders simply adopted the name for the park long after any Delaware departed the area—well over 100 years before in 1819.

The first lake of Shakamak Park was created by the stopping up of a 5-foot (1.5 m) sewer and additional lakes were added in following years (30 years later in the case of Lake Kickapoo). There were no lakes in the area prior to that time. It was purposely stocked with bass by Richard Lieber in May 1930, starting the park's fame for fishing in July 1932 after sufficient time had passed for the original bass to reproduce enough to populate the lake. Further development of the park also occurred with the help of the Civilian Conservation Corps (CCC). CCC Company 522 was located in the park from 1933 until 1942.

It was added to the National Register of Historic Places in 2000 as a national historic district.

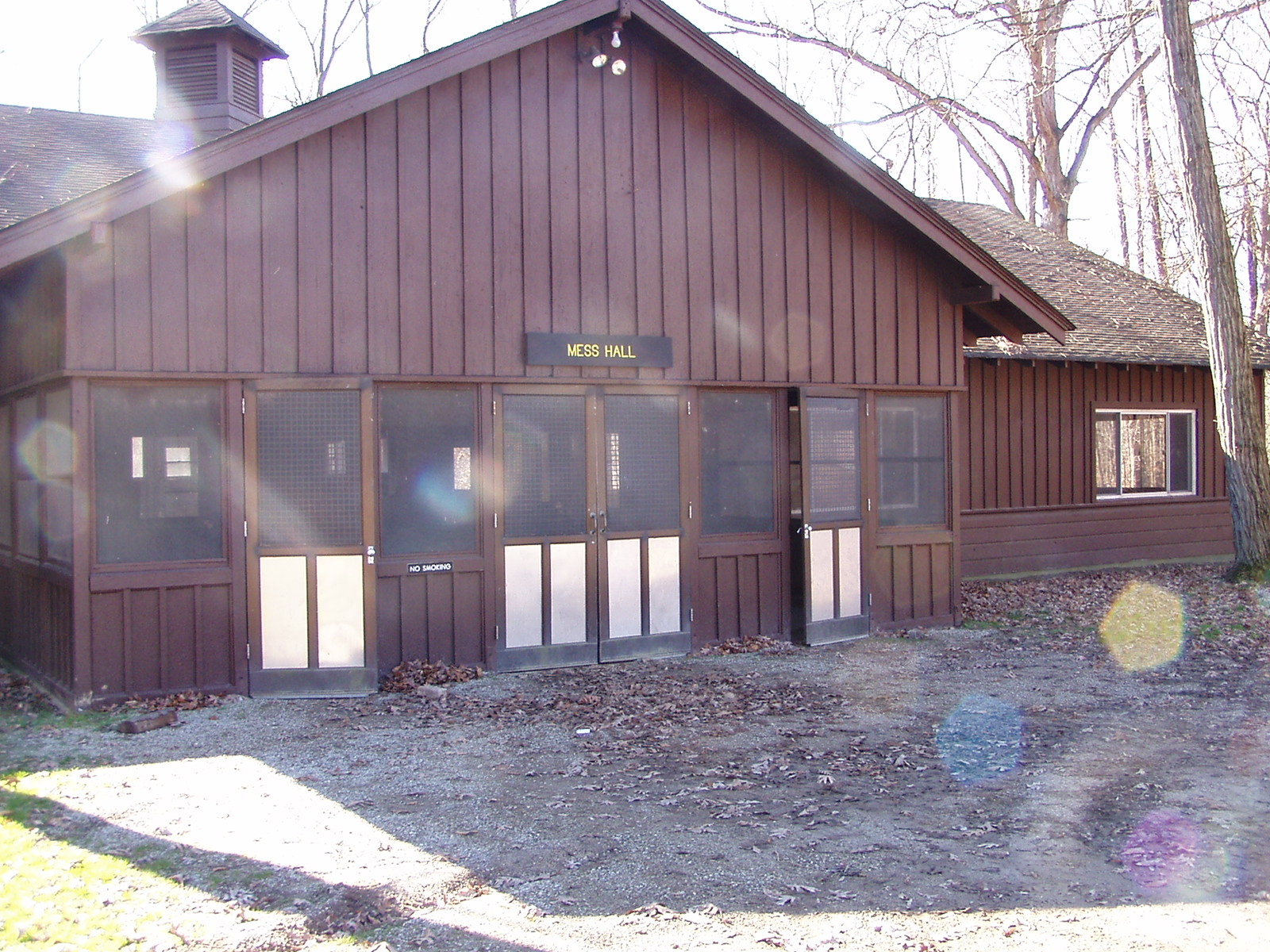
Mess Hall

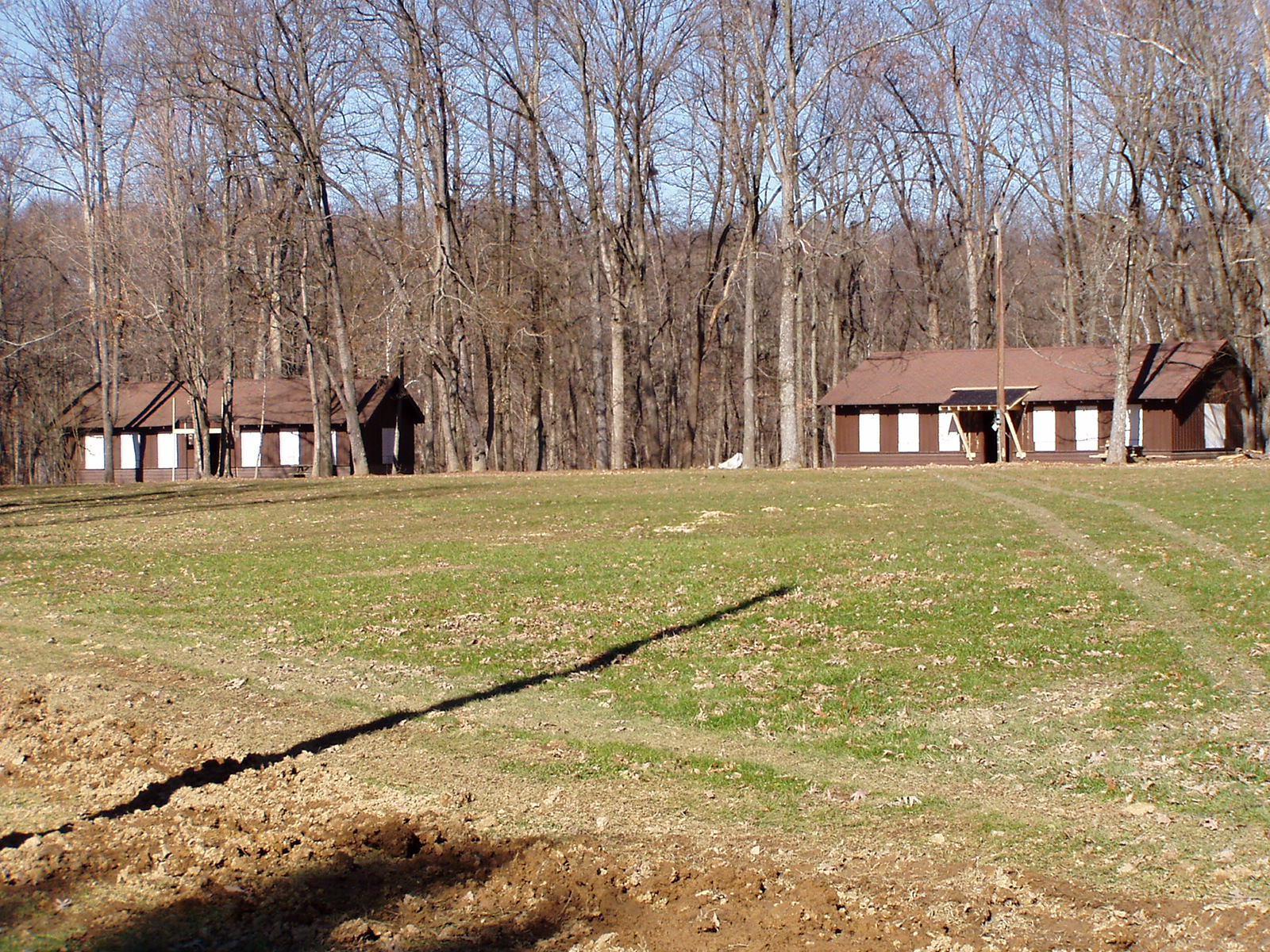
Barracks

Shakamak hosted many Mid-States AAU Championship Swim Meets, drawing a huge attendance. A platform and a 5 and 10 meter diving platform (called the "16" and "32" by local swimmers preferring to measure the heights approximately in feet) was created for the meets and remained open and in use by the general swimming public until the 1990s when Shakamak Lake was closed to swimming and a swimming pool was constructed.

The park is located approximately 3 miles (4.8 km) from Jasonville, Indiana, a town with the motto of "The Gateway to Shakamak".
