= Clay City, Indiana =

- Town
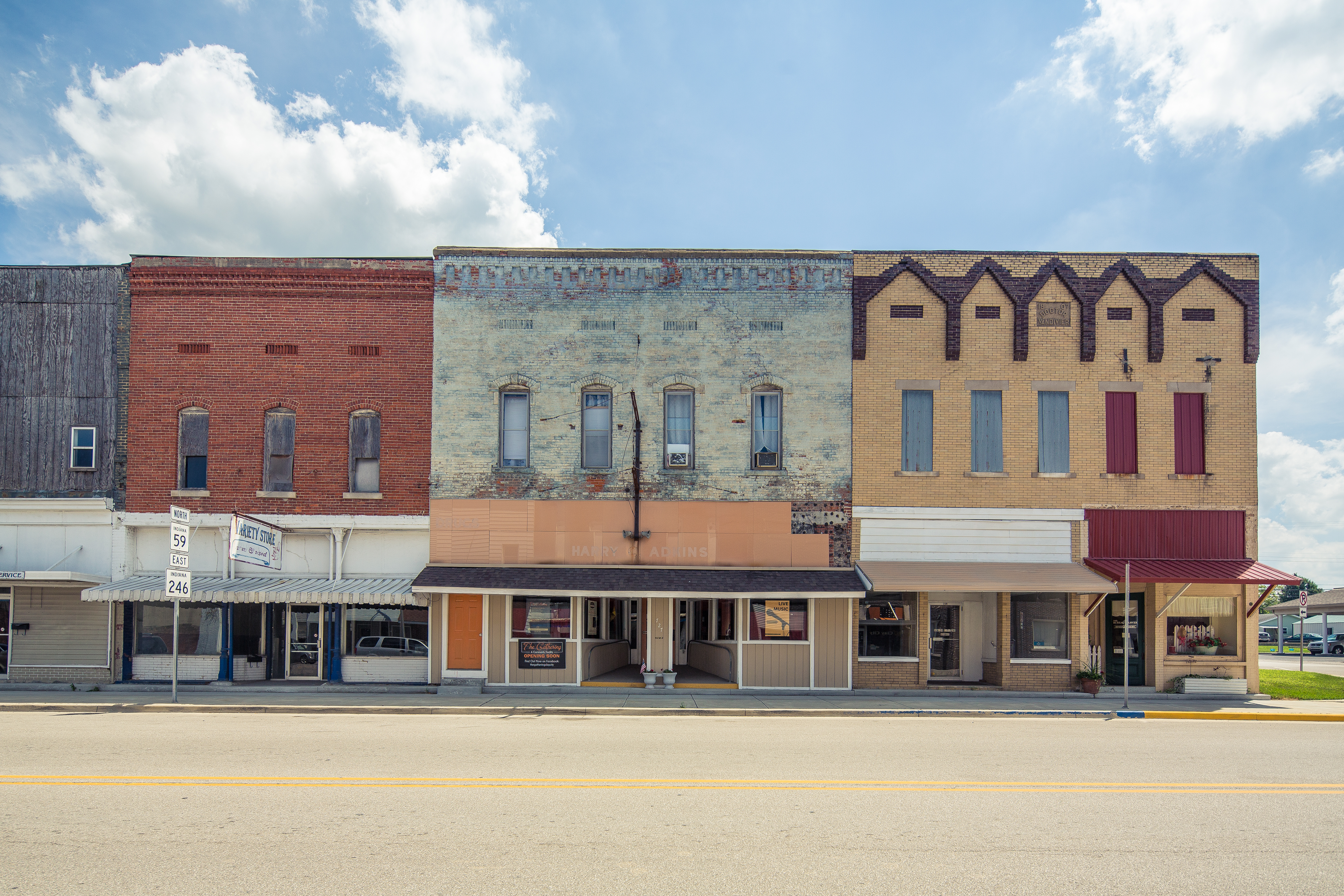

- Location of Clay City in Clay County, Indiana.
- Coordinates: 39°16′37″N 87°6′43″W
- Country: United States
- State: Indiana
- County: Clay
- Township: Harrison

Area
  - Total: 0.54 sq mi (1.40 km^{2})
  - Land: 0.54 sq mi (1.40 km^{2})
  - Water: 0 sq mi (0.00 km^{2})
- Elevation: 594 ft (181 m)

Population (2020)
  - Total: 878
  - Density: 1,629.2/sq mi (629.03/km^{2})
- Time zone: UTC-5 (EST)
  - Summer (DST): UTC-5 (EST)
- ZIP code: 47841
- Area code: 812
- FIPS code: 18-13276
- GNIS feature ID: 0432585
- Website: www.claycity.net

Clay City is a town in Harrison Township, Clay County, Indiana, United States. As of the 2020 census, Clay City had a population of 878. It is part of the Terre Haute Metropolitan Statistical Area.

== History ==
Clay City was originally called Markland, and under this latter name was platted in 1873 when the railroad was extended to that point. However, there was another post office with that name in the state, so this name could not be used because there was already an extant "Markland, Indiana." The name Huntersville was then adopted in honor of Congressman Morton C. Hunter. The Congressman was not popular in the local area, however, so residents objected to the name, and the name "Clay City" was eventually chosen by a local committee. Clay City is named for Kentucky statesman Henry Clay.

== Geography ==
Clay City is located at 39°16′37″N 87°6′43″W (39.277048, -87.112079).

According to the 2010 census, Clay City has a total area of 0.54 square miles (1.40 km^{2}), all land.

== Demographics ==
Historical population
| Census | Pop. | Note | %± |
|---|---|---|---|
| 1880 | 419 | | — |
| 1890 | 1,004 | | 139.6% |
| 1900 | 1,503 | | 49.7% |
| 1910 | 1,213 | | −19.3% |
| 1920 | 1,226 | | 1.1% |
| 1930 | 1,079 | | −12.0% |
| 1940 | 1,117 | | 3.5% |
| 1950 | 1,068 | | −4.4% |
| 1960 | 950 | | −11.0% |
| 1970 | 900 | | −5.3% |
| 1980 | 883 | | −1.9% |
| 1990 | 929 | | 5.2% |
| 2000 | 1,019 | | 9.7% |
| 2010 | 861 | | −15.5% |
| 2020 | 878 | | 2.0% |
U.S. Decennial Census

=== 2010 census ===
As of the census of 2010, there were 861 people, 361 households, and 241 families living in the town. The population density was 1,594.4 inhabitants per square mile (615.6/km^{2}). There were 436 housing units at an average density of 807.4 per square mile (311.7/km^{2}). The racial makeup of the town was 99.2% White, 0.1% Asian, and 0.7% from two or more races. Hispanic or Latino of any race were 0.7% of the population.

There were 361 households, of which 31.0% had children under the age of 18 living with them, 51.0% were married couples living together, 13.3% had a female householder with no husband present, 2.5% had a male householder with no wife present, and 33.2% were non-families. 29.6% of all households were made up of individuals, and 16.7% had someone living alone who was 65 years of age or older. The average household size was 2.39 and the average family size was 2.96.

The median age in the town was 39.2 years. 24.5% of residents were under the age of 18; 8% were between the ages of 18 and 24; 25% were from 25 to 44; 22.9% were from 45 to 64; and 19.6% were 65 years of age or older. The gender makeup of the town was 44.6% male and 55.4% female.

=== 2000 census ===
As of the census of 2000, there were 1,019 people, 442 households, and 281 families living in the town. The population density was 1,906.9 inhabitants per square mile (736.3/km^{2}). There were 473 housing units at an average density of 885.2 per square mile (341.8/km^{2}). The racial makeup of the town was 98.92% White, 0.10% from other races, and 0.98% from two or more races. Hispanic or Latino of any race were 0.79% of the population.

There were 442 households, out of which 28.7% had children under the age of 18 living with them, 51.1% were married couples living together, 8.8% had a female householder with no husband present, and 36.2% were non-families. 33.0% of all households were made up of individuals, and 21.5% had someone living alone who was 65 years of age or older. The average household size was 2.31 and the average family size was 2.90.

In the town, the population was spread out, with 24.6% under the age of 18, 6.9% from 18 to 24, 28.1% from 25 to 44, 20.7% from 45 to 64, and 19.7% who were 65 years of age or older. The median age was 37 years. For every 100 females, there were 85.9 males. For every 100 females age 18 and over, there were 82.9 males.

The median income for a household in the town was $31,316, and the median income for a family was $36,750. Males had a median income of $31,324 versus $19,479 for females. The per capita income for the town was $15,281. About 5.3% of families and 8.9% of the population were below the poverty line, including 11.4% of those under age 18 and 10.2% of those age 65 or over.
