= Jasonville, Indiana =

- City
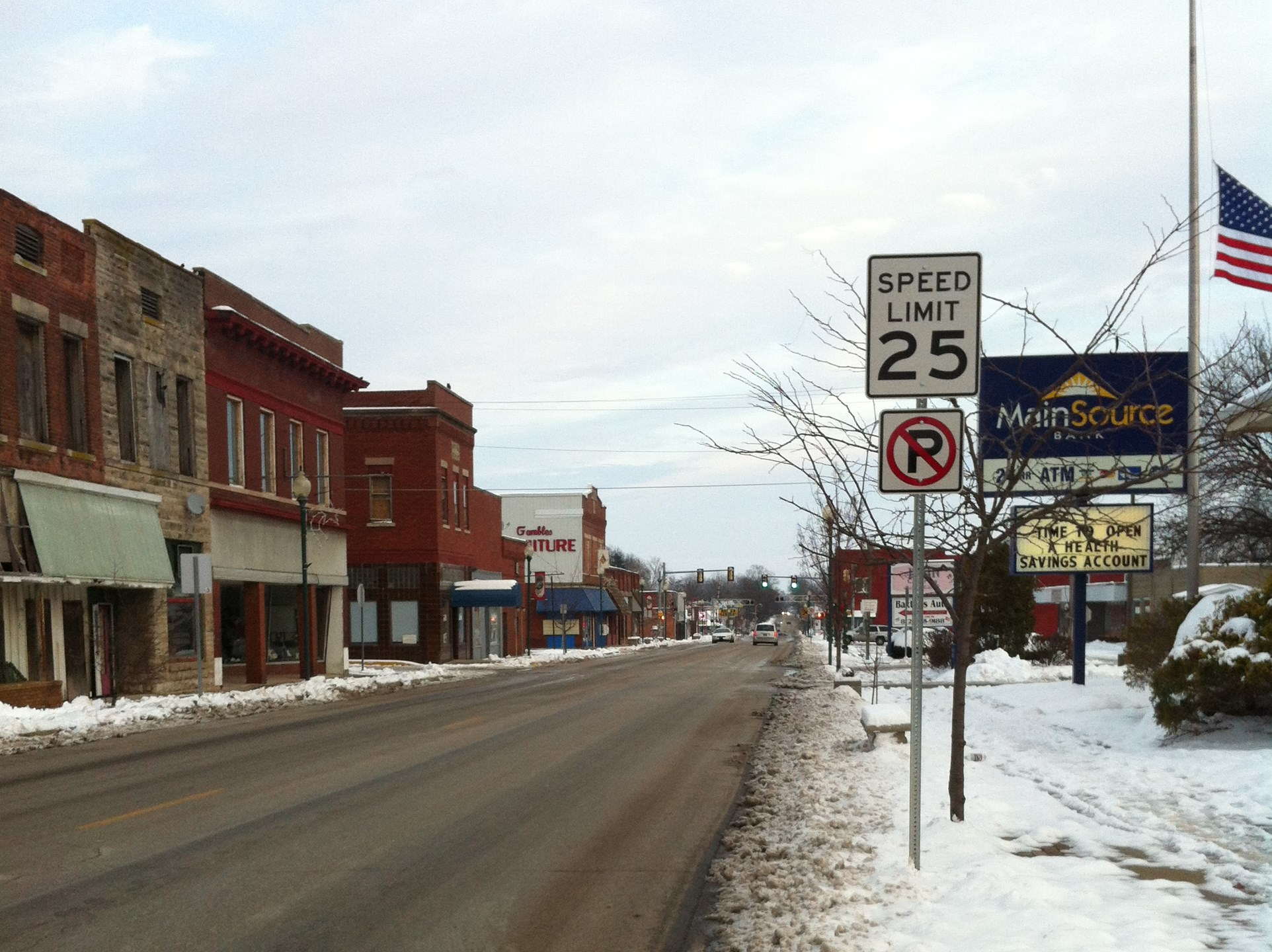
- Main Street in Jasonville

- Seal

- Location of Jasonville in Greene County, Indiana
- Coordinates: 39°09′44″N 87°11′59″W
- Country: United States
- State: Indiana
- County: Greene
- Township: Wright

Government
  - Mayor: Eric Siepman (R)

Area
  - Total: 1.27 sq mi (3.30 km^{2})
  - Land: 1.27 sq mi (3.28 km^{2})
  - Water: 0.0077 sq mi (0.02 km^{2})
- Elevation: 630 ft (190 m)

Population (2020)
  - Total: 1,983
  - Density: 1,564.1/sq mi (603.89/km^{2})
- Time zone: UTC-5 (EST)
  - Summer (DST): UTC-4 (EDT)
- ZIP code: 47438
- Area code: 812
- FIPS code: 18-37764
- GNIS feature ID: 2395457
- Website: Official website

Jasonville is a city in Wright Township, Greene County, Indiana, United States. The population was 1,966 as of the 2020 census. It is the westernmost community in the Bloomington, Indiana, Metropolitan Statistical Area, approximately 15 miles closer to Terre Haute than to Bloomington.

== History ==
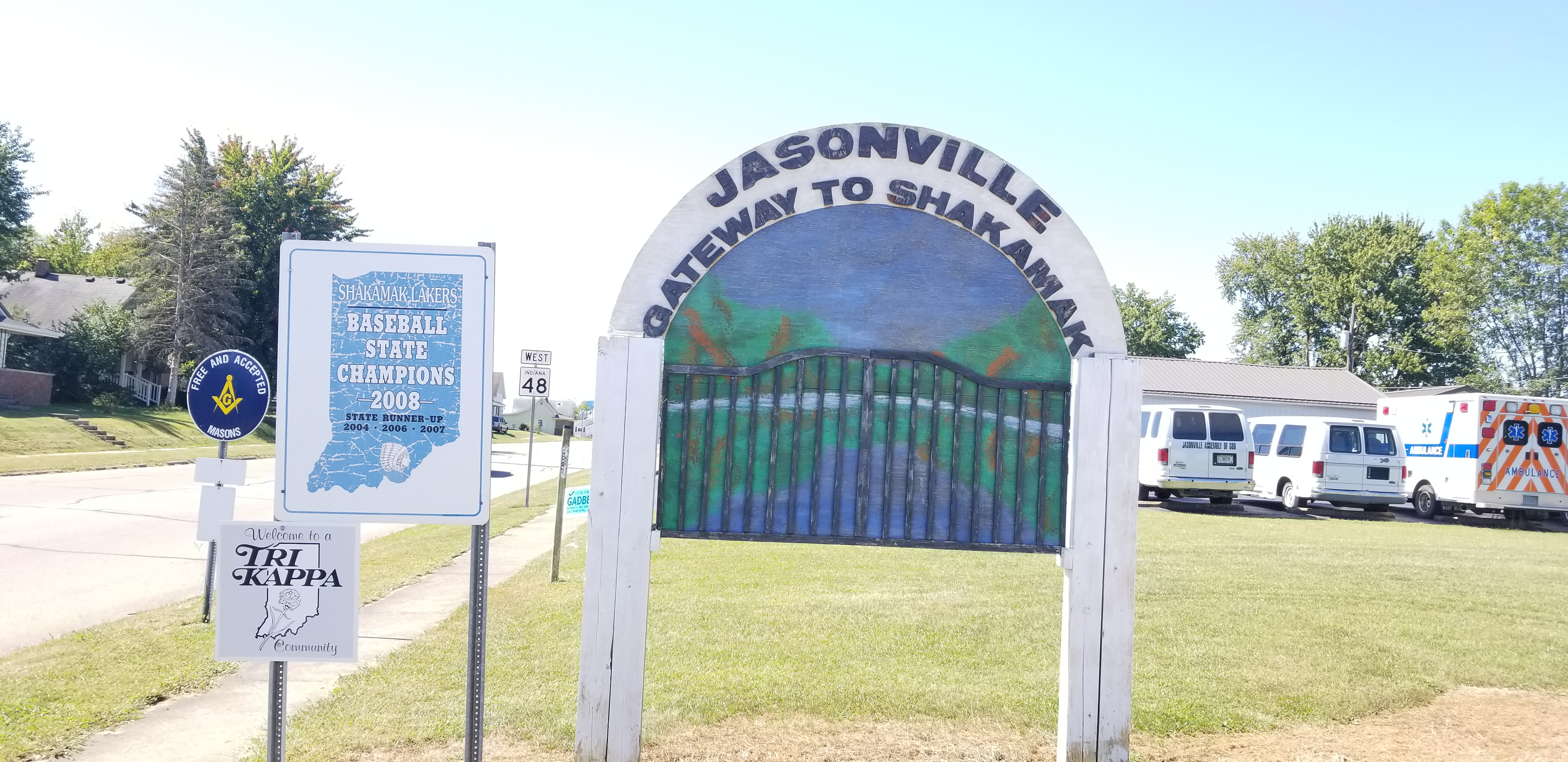
Sign welcoming people to Jasonville, Indiana

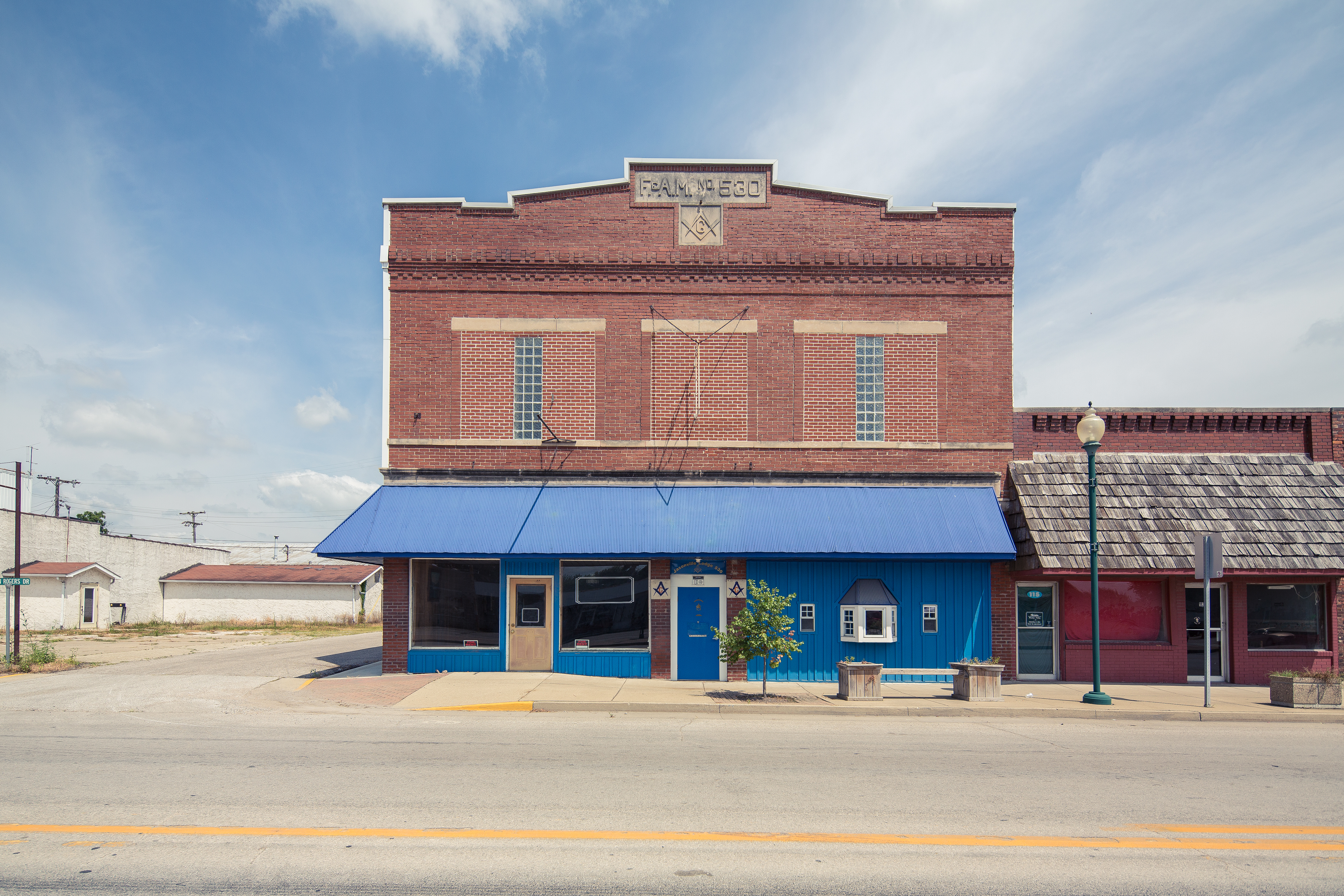
Photo from Small Town Indiana photo survey

Jasonville was founded in 1858. It was named for one of its founders, Jason Rogers.

In 1909 an anti-immigrant mob ran Hungarian immigrants out of town, forcing them to leave their belongings behind.

Jasonville is rich in history, including a big fire in 1914, a booming mining community of the past, and the establishment of Shakamak State Park. Jasonville's motto is "Gateway to Shakamak" as Shakamak State Park is only 1 mile from the town.

== Geography ==
According to the 2010 census, Jasonville has a total area of 1.31 square miles (3.39 km^{2}), all land.

== Demographics ==
Historical population
Census	Pop.	Note	%±
1880	69		—
1910	3,295		—
1920	4,461		35.4%
1930	3,536		−20.7%
1940	3,418		−3.3%
1950	2,937		−14.1%
1960	2,436		−17.1%
1970	2,335		−4.1%
1980	2,497		6.9%
1990	2,200		−11.9%
2000	2,490		13.2%
2010	2,222		−10.8%
2020	1,983		−10.8%
U.S. Decennial Census

=== 2020 census ===
As of the 2020 census, Jasonville had a population of 1,983. The median age was 39.0 years. 25.1% of residents were under the age of 18 and 18.2% of residents were 65 years of age or older. For every 100 females there were 93.7 males, and for every 100 females age 18 and over there were 90.1 males age 18 and over.

0.0% of residents lived in urban areas, while 100.0% lived in rural areas.

There were 792 households in Jasonville, of which 29.9% had children under the age of 18 living in them. Of all households, 38.1% were married-couple households, 21.3% were households with a male householder and no spouse or partner present, and 30.7% were households with a female householder and no spouse or partner present. About 33.0% of all households were made up of individuals and 16.6% had someone living alone who was 65 years of age or older.

There were 943 housing units, of which 16.0% were vacant. The homeowner vacancy rate was 3.6% and the rental vacancy rate was 15.1%.

Racial composition as of the 2020 census
Race	Number	Percent
White	1,920	96.8%
Black or African American	0	0.0%
American Indian and Alaska Native	4	0.2%
Asian	1	0.1%
Native Hawaiian and Other Pacific Islander	0	0.0%
Some other race	3	0.2%
Two or more races	55	2.8%
Hispanic or Latino (of any race)	34	1.7%

=== 2010 census ===
As of the census of 2010, there were 2,222 people, 882 households, and 568 families living in the city. The population density was 1,696.2 inhabitants per square mile (654.9/km^{2}). There were 1,022 housing units at an average density of 780.2 per square mile (301.2/km^{2}). The racial makeup of the city was 98.1% White, 0.2% African American, 0.1% Native American, 0.4% Asian, 0.4% from other races, and 0.9% from two or more races. Hispanic or Latino people of any race were 0.8% of the population.

There were 882 households, of which 36.3% had children under the age of 18 living with them, 44.9% were married couples living together, 13.3% had a female householder with no husband present, 6.2% had a male householder with no wife present, and 35.6% were non-families. 30.5% of all households were made up of individuals, and 17.4% had someone living alone who was 65 years of age or older. The average household size was 2.47 and the average family size was 3.05.

The median age in the city was 38.4 years. 26.7% of residents were under the age of 18; 7.4% were between the ages of 18 and 24; 24.4% were from 25 to 44; 24.5% were from 45 to 64; and 17.1% were 65 years of age or older. The gender makeup of the city was 47.4% male and 52.6% female.

=== 2000 census ===
As of the census of 2000, there were 2,490 people, 970 households, and 615 families living in the city. The population density was 1,912.0 inhabitants per square mile (738.2/km^{2}). There were 1,116 housing units at an average density of 856.9 per square mile (330.9/km^{2}). The racial makeup of the city was 98.27% White, 0.08% African American, 0.36% Native American, 0.24% Asian, 0.20% from other races, and 0.84% from two or more races. Hispanic or Latino people of any race were 1.00% of the population.

There were 970 households, out of which 33.8% had children under the age of 18 living with them, 46.5% were married couples living together, 12.4% had a female householder with no husband present, and 36.5% were non-families. 31.2% of all households were made up of individuals, and 16.0% had someone living alone who was 65 years of age or older. The average household size was 2.46 and the average family size was 3.08.

In the city, the population was spread out, with 26.1% under the age of 18, 9.4% from 18 to 24, 26.4% from 25 to 44, 20.0% from 45 to 64, and 18.1% who were 65 years of age or older. The median age was 37 years. For every 100 females, there were 88.8 males. For every 100 females age 18 and over, there were 82.5 males.

The median income for a household in the city was $23,208, and the median income for a family was $29,485. Males had a median income of $27,037 versus $18,304 for females. The per capita income for the city was $11,558. About 15.6% of families and 19.9% of the population were below the poverty line, including 26.0% of those under age 18 and 7.1% of those age 65 or over.

== Education ==
The city has a lending library, the Jasonville Public Library.

Jasonville is also home to Shakamak Junior-Senior High School and Shakamak Elementary.

== Notable people ==
- Bruce Borders, Indiana State Representative and former mayor of Jasonville
