= Worthington, Indiana =

- Town
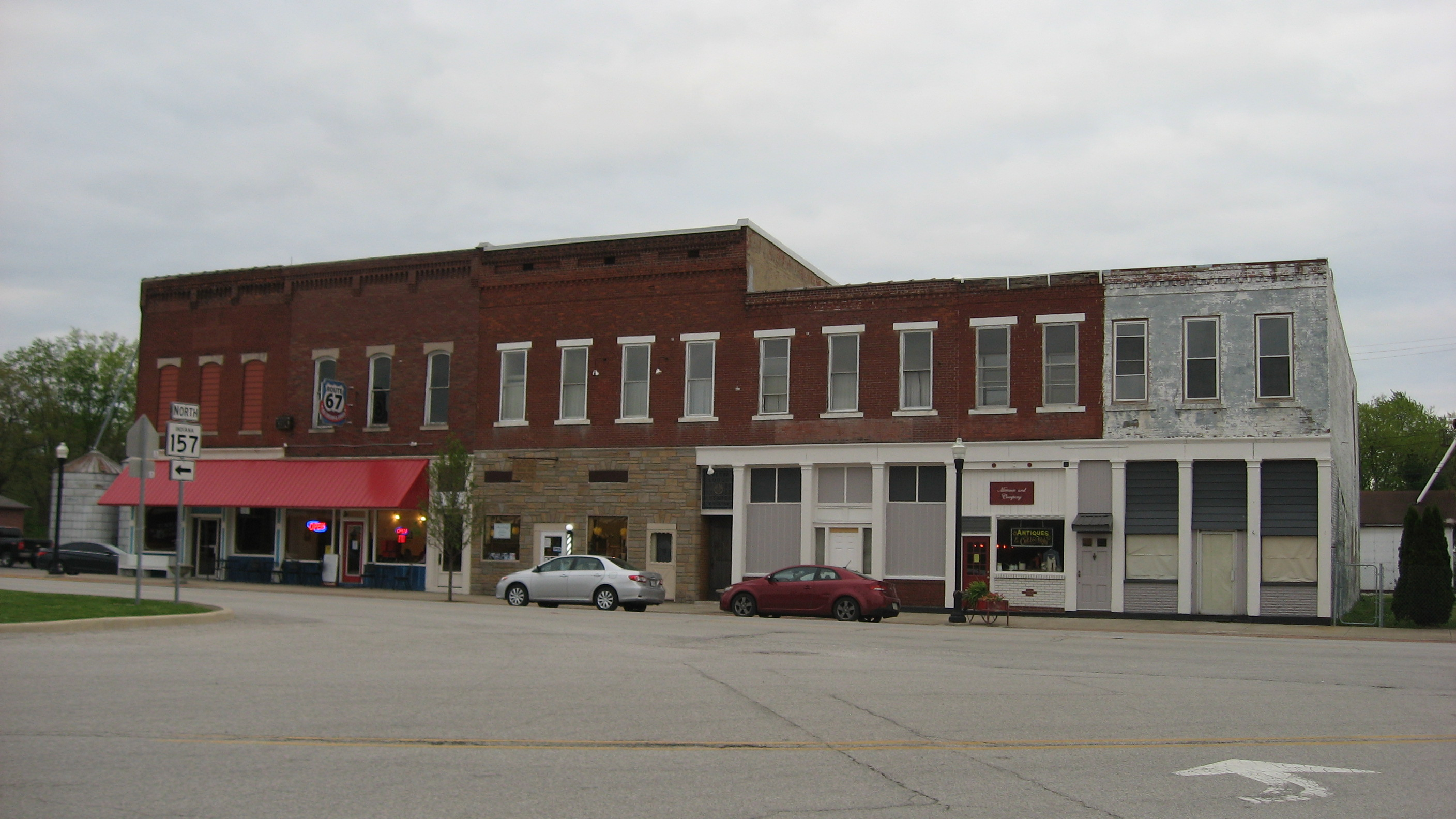
- Downtown Worthington

- Logo

- Location of Worthington in Greene County, Indiana.
- Coordinates: 39°07′15″N 86°58′52″W
- Country: United States
- State: Indiana
- County: Greene
- Township: Jefferson

Area
  - Total: 0.77 sq mi (2.00 km^{2})
  - Land: 0.77 sq mi (2.00 km^{2})
  - Water: 0 sq mi (0.00 km^{2})
- Elevation: 518 ft (158 m)

Population (2020)
  - Total: 1,393
  - Density: 1,803.8/sq mi (696.44/km^{2})
- Time zone: UTC-5 (Eastern (EST))
  - Summer (DST): UTC-4 (EDT)
- ZIP code: 47471
- Area code: 812
- FIPS code: 18-85598
- GNIS feature ID: 2397756
- Website: www.in.gov/towns/worthington/

Worthington is a town in Jefferson Township, Greene County, Indiana, United States. The population was 1,393 at the 2020 United States Census. It is part of the Bloomington, Indiana, Metropolitan Statistical Area.

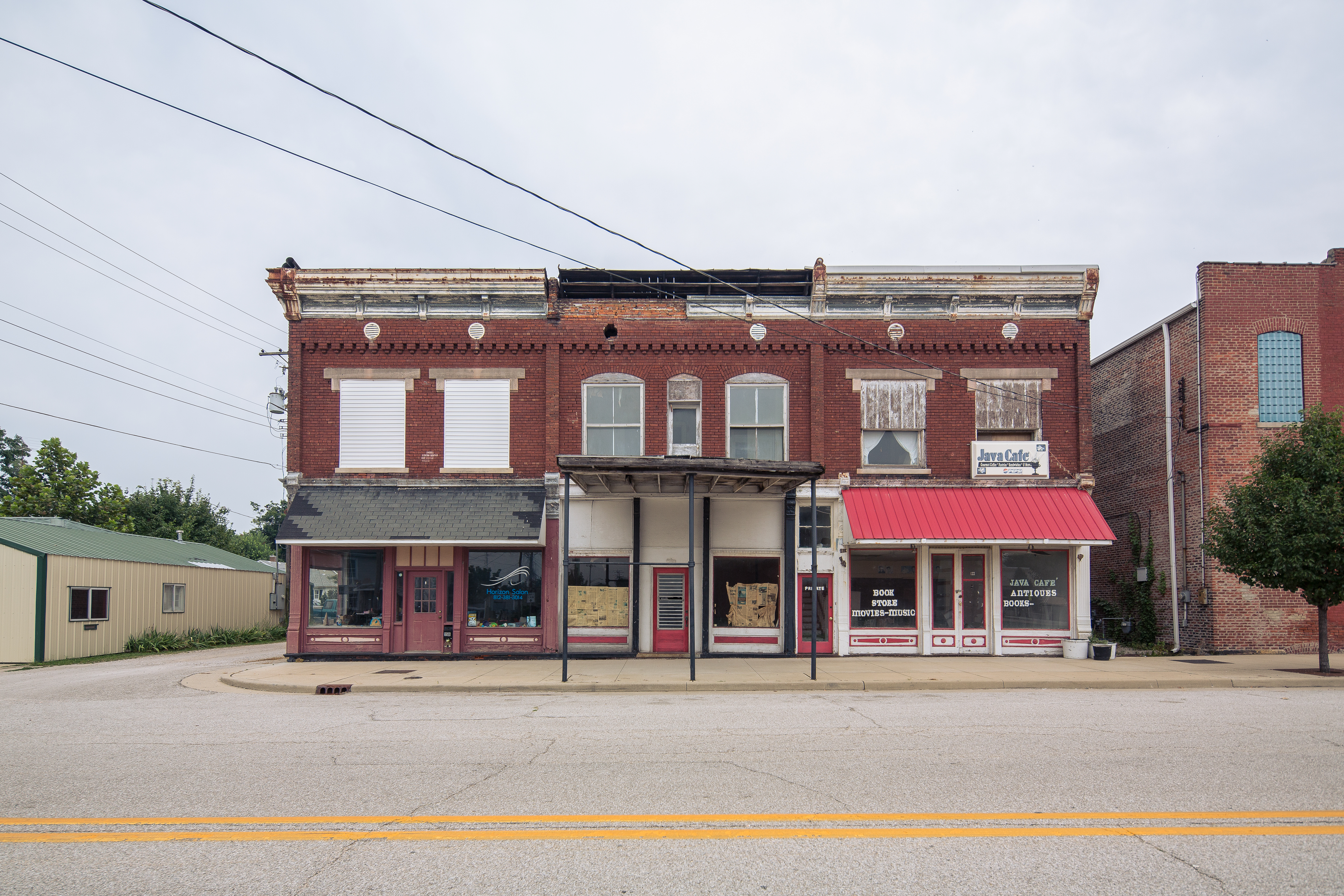
Worthington, Indiana

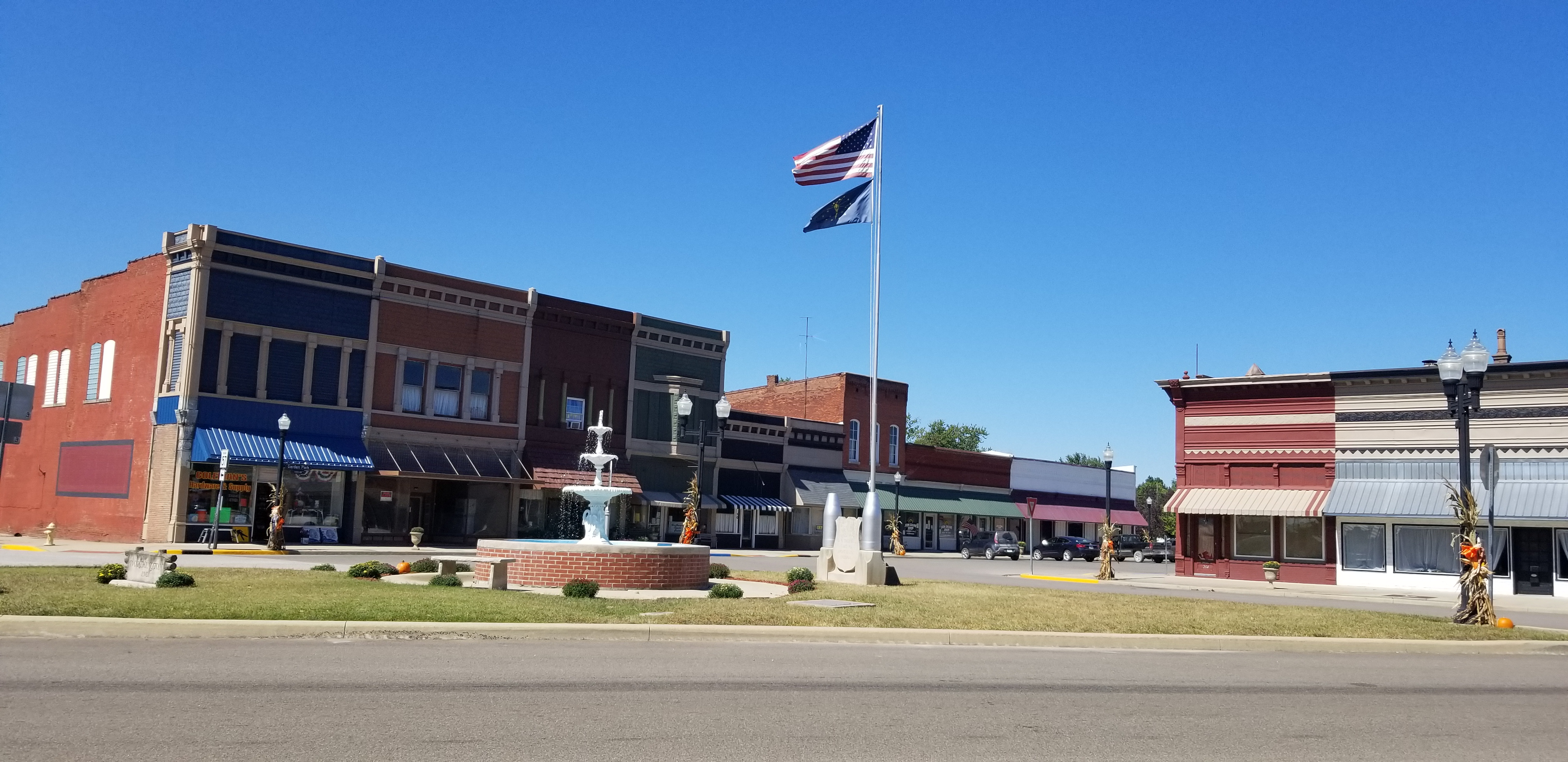
Worthington, Indiana fountain

== History ==
The Worthington post office was established in 1850. The town was named after Worthington, Ohio.

== Geography ==
According to the 2010 census, Worthington has a total area of 0.81 square miles (2.10 km^{2}), all land.

== Demographics ==
Historical population
Census	Pop.	Note	%±
1880	1,185		—
1890	1,448		22.2%
1900	1,448		0.0%
1910	1,732		19.6%
1920	1,853		7.0%
1930	1,687		−9.0%
1940	1,729		2.5%
1950	1,627		−5.9%
1960	1,635		0.5%
1970	1,691		3.4%
1980	1,574		−6.9%
1990	1,473		−6.4%
2000	1,481		0.5%
2010	1,463		−1.2%
2020	1,393		−4.8%
Source: US Census Bureau

=== 2010 census ===
As of the 2010 United States census, there were 1,463 people, 625 households, and 400 families in the town. The population density was 1,806.2 inhabitants per square mile (697.4/km^{2}). There were 716 housing units at an average density of 884.0 per square mile (341.3/km^{2}). The racial makeup of the town was 98.5% White, 0.1% African American, 0.3% Native American, 0.1% Asian, 0.5% from other races, and 0.5% from two or more races. Hispanic or Latino of any race were 1.4% of the population.

There were 625 households, of which 32.5% had children under the age of 18 living with them, 48.2% were married couples living together, 11.7% had a female householder with no husband present, 4.2% had a male householder with no wife present, and 36.0% were non-families. 31.8% of all households were made up of individuals, and 15.7% had someone living alone who was 65 years of age or older. The average household size was 2.34 and the average family size was 2.93.

The median age in the town was 39 years. 24.1% of residents were under the age of 18; 8.7% were between the ages of 18 and 24; 24% were from 25 to 44; 25.1% were from 45 to 64; and 18.1% were 65 years of age or older. The gender makeup of the town was 47.8% male and 52.2% female.

=== 2000 census ===
As of the 2000 United States census, there were 1,481 people, 644 households, and 410 families in the town. The population density was 1,834.4 people per square mile (708.3 people/km^{2}). There were 726 housing units at an average density of 899.2 per square mile (347.2/km^{2}). The racial makeup of the town was 98.58% White, 0.07% African American, 0.27% Native American, 0.07% Asian, and 1.01% from two or more races. Hispanic or Latino of any race were 0.41% of the population.

There were 644 households, out of which 26.4% had children under the age of 18 living with them, 50.3% were married couples living together, 9.9% had a female householder with no husband present, and 36.2% were non-families. 31.8% of all households were made up of individuals, and 18.8% had someone living alone who was 65 years of age or older. The average household size was 2.29 and the average family size was 2.82.

The town population contained 23.6% under the age of 18, 7.4% from 18 to 24, 26.1% from 25 to 44, 22.7% from 45 to 64, and 20.2% who were 65 years of age or older. The median age was 40 years. For every 100 females, there were 87.0 males. For every 100 females age 18 and over, there were 82.7 males.

The median income for a household in the town was $27,778, and the median income for a family was $37,604. Men had a median income of $29,219 versus $21,792 for women. The per capita income for the town was $18,761. About 9.2% of families and 13.0% of the population were below the poverty line, including 15.0% of those under age 18 and 8.4% of those age 65 or over.

== Education ==
The town has a lending library, the Worthington-Jefferson Township Public Library.
