= I-Zoom =

Electronic toll collection system

i-Zoom
- Product type: Toll transponder
- Current owner: Indiana Toll Road Concession Company
- Country: United States
- Introduced: June 27, 2007; 19 years ago
- Discontinued: September 2012; 14 years ago
- Related brands: E-ZPass and I-Pass
- Markets: Northwest Indiana

i-Zoom was the former name for the electronic toll collection system used on the Indiana Toll Road (ITR), which now uses the E-ZPass system. On June 27, 2007, the system was implemented from mile 1 to mile 23 of the road under the unique branding of "i-Zoom", which was fully compatible with E-ZPass and the Illinois State Toll Highway Authority's I-Pass system; the remaining toll plazas came online on April 1, 2008, with increased cash toll rates. i-Zoom transponders were then made available for purchase at service plazas and CVS/pharmacy locations in northern Indiana. The i-Zoom branding was retired by the ITR for the universal E-ZPass branding used by most states in the E-ZPass system in 2012.

== Compatibility with intrastate toll systems ==
The Indiana E-ZPass system is compatible with both the ISTHA's I-Pass and the E-ZPass systems used throughout the Eastern Seaboard states, and by the neighboring Ohio Turnpike, which opened their E-ZPass system at the beginning of September 2009. The Indiana Toll Road and the ISTHA entered into a reciprocal agreement whereby holders of either the i-Zoom or I-Pass receive a discount on tolls in either state, as well as E-ZPass users, and it is likewise the case between the ITR and Ohio Turnpike Commission. Toll discounts are currently not offered with electronic tolling on the Skyway. The discount to I-Pass users is subsidized by the State of Indiana rather than by the ITR's operator.

There are issues with the reciprocal use of I-PASS by Illinois motorists and E-ZPass Indiana motorists on the other state's toll road. Each state charges the other a transaction fee when the out-of-state transponder is used to pay a toll. About 70 percent of all electronic transactions on the ITR are done with I-PASS transponders, according to Illinois Tollway Authority figures. Until January 1, 2010, the fee was absorbed, with I-PASS users paying twice as many Indiana tolls as E-ZPass Indiana users paying Illinois tolls. To address this imbalance, the ITR began charging E-ZPass Indiana users a 3¢ surcharge on each of their Indiana Toll Road tolls, effective January 1, 2010. The ITR has signage which states the Illinois Tollway is charging the additional fee to I-PASS users, but this is incorrect since the Illinois Tollway is only able to charge tolls or fees on Illinois Tollways. The 3¢ surcharge, rather, was a business decision by ITR Concession Company, the private company that operates the Indiana Toll Road, to recoup money lost as a result of the Illinois Tollway billing the ITRCC for a variety of customer service costs and the uneven amount of electronic transactions in the two states.

== Purchasing and care ==
As of 2026, the cost of a transponder was $25 (plus a $15 transponder issuance fee), with $10 (or $8 of it if bought via retail) credited as a starting balance for the tag. A $1.50 monthly fee is also deducted from the account balance. Due to the low price and pre-paid deposit amount, Indiana's implementation is the lowest-priced transponder currently in the E-ZPass system. If users of both the I-Pass and Indiana's E-ZPass systems have both transponders, unshielded, in their vehicle, the system will charge a toll on both devices—double payment—at a toll plaza; the storage bag which comes in the device's welcome kit is metallic and acts as a Faraday cage if one of the transponders is kept in it, preventing it from incorrectly being detected by the toll plaza's system.
