= Romanian mafia =

Organized crime groups from Romania

- Founded: Late 1960s
- Founding location: Romania
- Territory: Romania, the Balkans, Moldova, Italy, Spain, United Kingdom, Mexico, Brazil, United States, France, Germany, Belgium, Netherlands, Australia
- Ethnicity: Romanians, Moldovans, Romanis
- Criminal activities: Human trafficking, illegal drug trade, prostitution, murder, cigarette smuggling, extortion, cyber crime, arms trafficking, property crime, racketeering, RFID skimming, online automotive fraud, wire fraud, robbery, loan sharking, assault, kidnapping, theft, contract killing
- Allies: Sicilian Mafia; Camorra; Ndrangheta; Albanian mafia Bulgarian mafia Serbian mafia Sinaloa Cartel

The Romanian mafia or Romanian organized crime (Romanian: Mafia Românească) is the category of organized crime groups whose members are citizens of Romania or living abroad in the Romanian diaspora. In recent years they have expanded their criminal activities in the European Union, reads a Europol report on EU organized crime, being active mostly in Italy, Spain and the United Kingdom. The Romanian Mafia is composed of several major organized groups, which in turn have wider networks throughout Europe and have even reached as far as North and Central America.

Including major heists and some of the biggest scams in history, the Romanian mafia is known worldwide for ATM-skimmings as well as pimping and drug trafficking. Gangs are organized horizontally, the leader of a group being called 'Nașu' which means "Godfather" in Romanian. Some Mafia groups in Romania also known as "Clanuri Interlope" or "Brigăzi" have codes of silence and also marked Mafia tattoos. Police in Australia who have dealt with a violent wave of Romanian gangs said that "The Romanians are one of the hardest criminal enterprises to crack due to the fact that they usually only deal with other Romanians and can be extremely violent when needed. Romanian Mafia gangs in the Americas are different than those in the EU, where in the Americas the Romanian mafia has built a very lucrative pact with the Sinaloa Cartel".

In Romania, the criminal organisations have deep connections into politics.

== Regional and national activities ==
=== Italy ===
In Italy, most of the Romanian criminals are involved in theft and pimping, however, in Turin, they created an Italian-style mafia within their local community, extorting money from Romanian night-clubs that ran prostitutes, and would impose their own businesses and singers on weddings by force.

Also in Turin, Romanian criminals created the 'Brigada Oarza' group, specialized in extortion, robbery and drug trafficking. In 2014, 15 members of the Brigada Oarza were convicted of mafia affiliation, being sentenced up to 15 years in prison. It was the first Italian sentence that condemned a group of Romanian people for mafia-style criminal association. The leader of the Brigada Oarza was allegedly the former professional boxer Viorel Lovu.

=== Mexico ===
The Daily Mail first reported Romanian mafia activities in tourist areas of the southeastern state of Quintana Roo in September 2015. The article said that USD $5 million were being stolen via cloned bank cards every month in Cancún, Playa del Carmen, Tulum, and Cozumel, and that the organization had stolen information of 32,000 people. In June 2020, the non-profit organization Mexicanos Contra la Corrupción y la Impunidad ("Mexicans against Corruption and Impunity", MCCI), together with the Organized Crime and Corruption Reporting Project (OCCRP), presented an investigation that demonstrated the Romanian mafia had actually reached Mexico in March 2014 and had spread to other states including Jalisco and Guanajuato. Starting in 2014, the group had a contract to install ATMs in banks in tourist areas, and by mid-2019, it had stolen $1.2 billion. Romanian businessman Florian Tudor (El Tiburón or "The Shark") was arrested in Quintana Roo in 2019 but released a few hours later for a lack of evidence. Tudor denied his culpability and implicated Constantin Marcu instead. Marcu, a known extortioner, was killed during a supposed kidnapping attempt of Tudor's cousin in 2018. In February 2021, scores of Romanian citizens were arrested at the Cancún airport and, days later, 136 were allowed into the country and four were deported because there was a travel alert against them. The next day, Santiago Nieto, head of Mexico's Financial Intelligence Unit (UIF), announced that 79 accounts of Mexicans and Romanians had been frozen for cloning credit and debit cards. Prominent Mexican business and political leaders were included in the list. Mexican and Venezuelan hackers were also implicated. The Ecologist Green Party of Mexico (PVEM) removed its legislative leader in Quintana Roo, José de la Peña Ruiz de Chávez, for his relationship with the mafia on February 10, 2021.'

== Major Crimes ==
=== Sex-trafficking ===
Romanian Flag

In Europe, Romania continues to be the largest country of origin for victims of labor and sex trafficking. The majority of victims who have been found are women who were trafficked and exploited for sex in Romania as well as other European nations like Austria, Ireland, Italy, Spain, and the UK. Children living in or graduating from government-run institutions, children whose parents migrate overseas for employment, individuals from the Roma community, low-income and educated women, migrants, and asylum seekers are among the vulnerable populations. Based on relationships to one's family or shared hobbies, traffickers work alone or in small groups.

Romanian women are being forced into commercial sex or labor after being recruited for fictitious weddings in Western Europe. NGOs and government representatives claim that traffickers are increasingly recruiting victims especially children—through social media and the internet. In Romania, the number of victims of trafficking who have been identified is around 50%. Children in government-run facilities are still at risk of being victims of sex trafficking, especially girls who reside in homes and placement centers for people with impairments. A number of non-governmental organizations have observed that females who are underage are recruited by previous occupants of government-run homes or residential institutes. Traffickers use forced begging and sex slavery to take advantage of Romani minors. Children as young as five are exploited in child work; child labor abuse is still underreported.

Media reports on children working seasonally in the Black Sea coast hotel sector are still being made. In addition to forced begging and stealing in Romania and other European nations, traffickers use adults and children from Romania for labor trafficking in the fields of agriculture, construction, hotels, manufacturing, and domestic service. There are rumors that traffickers from Romania and Moldova take advantage of Moldovan women and girls in their operations throughout Europe.

==== Drugs ====
{{Romania forms part of the north Balkan route that is used for heroin smuggling. Heroin is trafficked from Georgian ports on the Black Sea by ferry to Odessa, or other destinations in the EU such as Romania or Bulgaria, after which it enters the eastern branch of the main Balkan route for trafficking onward to the Netherlands and other countries in West and central Europe.| Ocindex}} Prominent criminal organizations have a history of infiltrating lawful company structures to support their massive drug trafficking operations by setting up legal logistical trade infrastructure. These illegal operations have been covered up by a number of EU-wide companies. Key connections are established by Romanians residing in South America and South Americans residing in Romania for organized crime groups involved in the cocaine trade. Amphetamine is typically trafficked from Germany, Belgium, and Bulgaria, while MDMA/Ecstasy found in Romania is mostly trafficked from Germany and the Netherlands. The majority of newly developed psychoactive drugs originate in Asia and are typically sent there via mail.

Additionally, Romania is now a drug transit route from South America. Cocaine is currently trafficked using the same criminal infrastructure that was created to traffic massive quantities of heroin or synthetic substances. To assess the risk and come under the inspection of the authorities, this infrastructure is disguising itself as legitimate. For organized crime groups interested in creating fresh alternative pathways, Romanian nationals residing in South America and South Americans living in Romania establish reliable connections. Cocaine smuggling on maritime routes and into Black Sea ports in Bulgaria and Romania has been more prevalent in recent years among Balkan criminal gangs, including Albanian, Serbo-Montenegrin, and Bulgarian groups.

Cannabis is the most often used drug in Romania. Most users are young people, often between the ages of fifteen and thirty-four. Although most of the cannabis in Romania is grown on the country's soil, it is imported from Albania, Greece, and Spain. Although Romania imports cannabis from Spain and the Netherlands, the majority of the drug found there is manufactured locally. The border crossing of Vatin/Stamora Moravita is the hub for the trafficking of cannabis from Serbia to Romania. Romanian lawmakers are now debating whether or not to legalize cannabis and other cannabinoids for medical use. The Ministry of Health and the government, however, are vehemently against the idea. Furthermore, Romania's market for synthetic drugs is growing. Although research indicates that amphetamines and ecstasy are still more expensive in Romania than in Western Europe, production of these drugs has increased and costs have decreased in recent years.

===== Wildlife Dangers =====
Large-scale illegal logging is still occurring in Romania. According to the Environmental Investigation Agency, over half of Romania's annual wood harvest is done illegally. Given that the nation is home to one of the largest surviving forests in the region, this illicit market is likely one of the largest in the EU. The majority of Romania's forests are privately owned, and there is evidence of private companies' participation in the illicit logging trade, frequently in coordination with organized crime groups. A system of blind collaboration exists between the police and illegal loggers and rangers, contributing to the corruption that afflicts the forestry industry.

Romania is a major source, transit, and destination country for wildlife trafficking, as evidenced by the products of wildlife that have been seized by foreign customs officers. Romanian sturgeon and caviar are highly profitable illegal commodities. Legitimate caviar that is bred in captivity is mixed with some illicit caviar. Corruption makes sturgeon poaching easier, and beluga sturgeon poaching is made worse by organized crime and a lack of other sources of income for fishing communities. To guarantee their survival and stop their extinction, Romania outlawed the catching and sale of wild sturgeons in 2021. Furthermore, there is a sizable illicit bird trade in Romania, which is usually supported by networks of Italians who shoot the birds and transport them into Italy.The principal natural resources of Romania include uranium, salt, coal, gas, and oil. While there are occasional reports of gasoline theft, organized crime does not appear to be involved on a large scale. The emergence of shadow economies could pose a threat to Romania given the reported examples of corruption involving significant gas reserves.

== Most notorious criminal groups ==
The capital of Romania, Bucharest, is divided into 6 administrative units called sectoare:

- Sector 1: dominated mainly by the Geamănu clan, which became famous after stealing the vehicle of the Romanian businessman George Becali. The Sadoveanu clan operates here too, which is engaged in prostitution.
- Sector 2: controlled by the Caran clan.
- Sector 3: under the control of the Chira clan, known for prostitution.
- Sector 4: Sportivii clan, known for extortion and credit card fraud. The Vancica Clan is also active in this sector, in particular in the cigarette smuggling business.
- Sector 5: Cămătarilor clan, prostitution, loan sharking.
- Sector 6: Luptătorii clan, extortion, usury and racketeering.
