= George Riebau =

George Riebau was a bookseller and bookbinder in Blandford Street, London to whom Michael Faraday was apprenticed in 1805 at the age of fourteen.

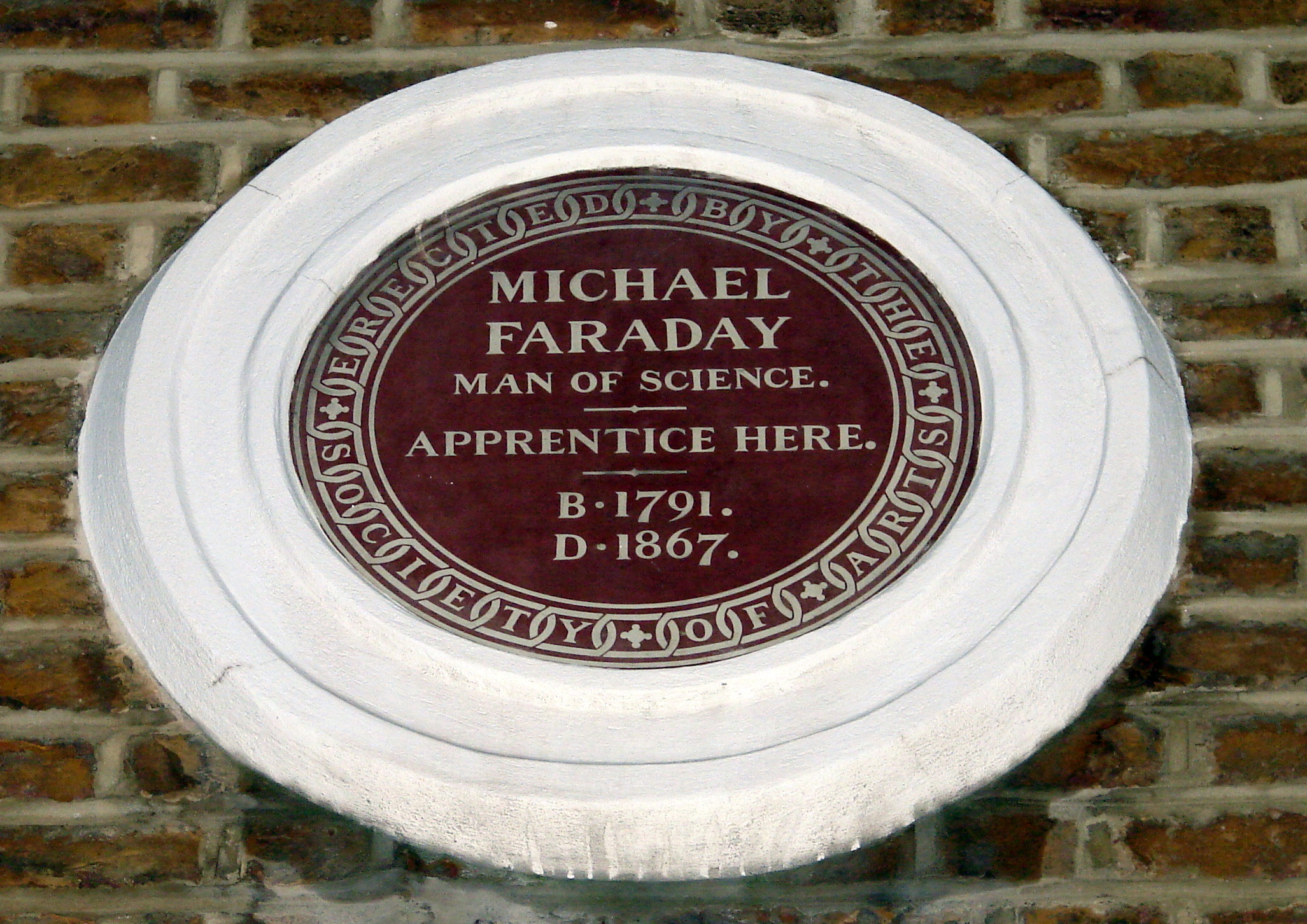
Plaque #19 on Open Plaques

During his seven years' apprenticeship, Faraday made good use of the priceless access to books which his employment gave him and which his generous employer allowed: "Whilst an apprentice, I loved to read the scientific books which were under my hands." Riebau later wrote: "If I had any curious book from my customers to bind, with plates, he would copy such as he thought singular or clever."

It was Riebau who arranged, through one of his customers, for Faraday to be given tickets to hear Humphry Davy lecture on Chemistry at the Royal Institution; Faraday took notes which he later showed to Davy and which led to his joining the RI, the start of his distinguished scientific career.

Many years later Faraday dedicated a book to Riebau, writing: "...you kindly interested yourself in the progress I made in the knowledge of facts relating to the different theories in existence, readily permitting me to examine those books in your possession that were in any way related to the subjects occupying my attention."
