= Michael Faraday =

English chemist and physicist (1791–1867)

Michael Faraday FRS
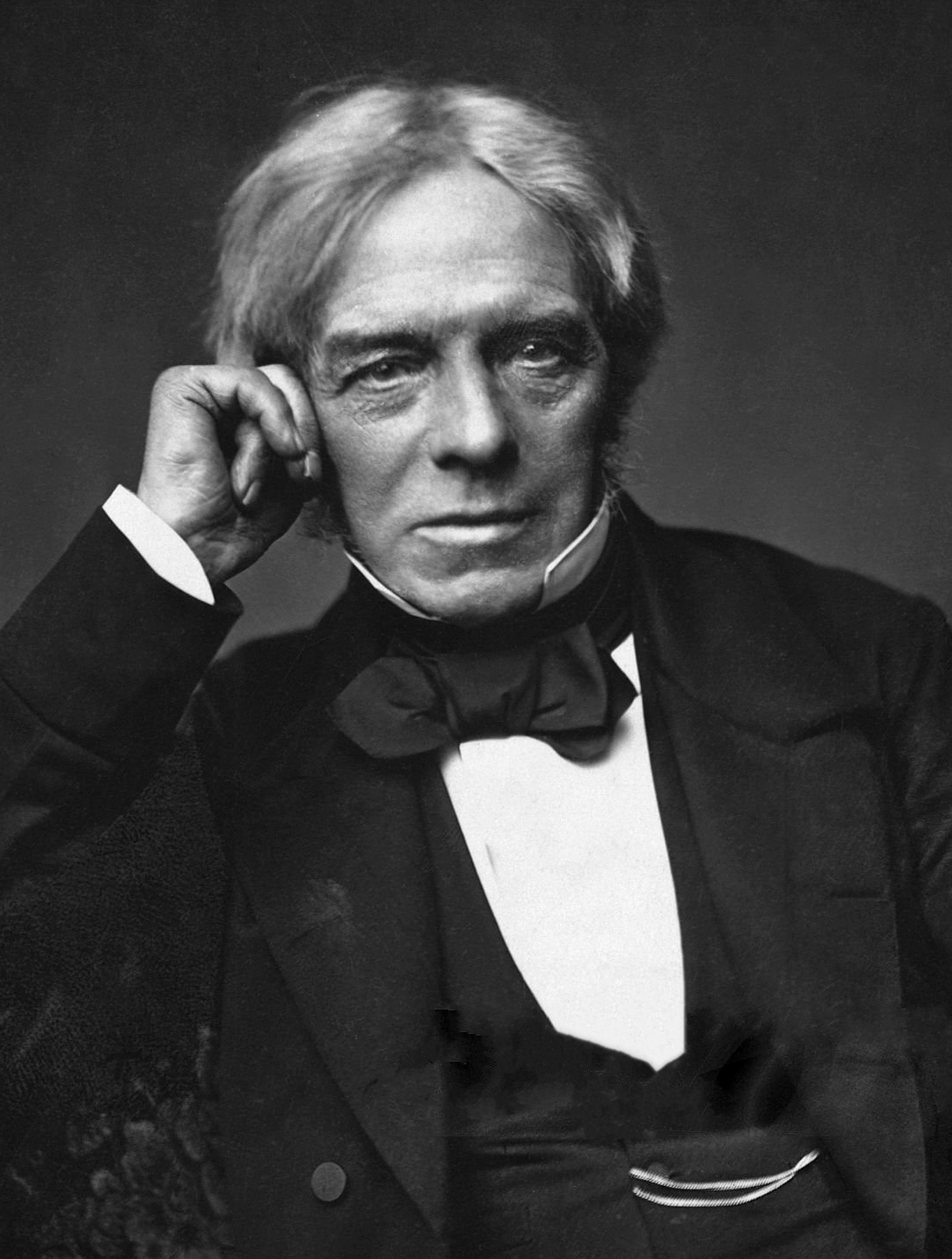
- Faraday, c. 1850s
- Born: 22 September 1791; Newington Butts, Surrey, England
- Died: 25 August 1867 (aged 75); Hampton, Middlesex, England
- Resting place: Highgate Cemetery, London
- Known for: Inventing the homopolar motor (1821); Discovering benzene (1825); Discovering electromagnetic induction (1831); Faraday's laws of electrolysis (1833); Faraday's ice pail experiment (1843); Faraday effect (1845)
- Title: Fullerian Professor of Chemistry (1833–1867)
- Successor: William Odling
- Spouse: Sarah Barnard (m. 1821)
- Awards: FRS (1824); Bakerian Medal (1829, 1832, 1849, 1851, 1857); Copley Medal (1832, 1838); Royal Medal (1835, 1846); Rumford Medal (1846); Albert Medal (1866)
- Scientific career
- Fields: Chemistry; physics
- Workplaces: Royal Institution (1821–1867)
- Academic advisors: Humphry Davy

Michael Faraday (Note: UK: /ˈfærədeɪ/ FARR-ə-day, US: /ˈfeɪrədeɪ/ FAYR-ə-day) (22 September 1791 – 25 August 1867) was an English chemist and physicist who contributed vastly to the study of electrochemistry and electromagnetism. His main discoveries include the principles underlying electromagnetic induction, diamagnetism, and electrolysis. Despite receiving little formal education, as an autodidact Faraday became one of the most influential scientists in history. It was by his research on the magnetic field around a conductor carrying a direct current that Faraday established the concept of the electromagnetic field in physics. Faraday also established that magnetism could affect rays of light and that there was an underlying relationship between the two phenomena. He similarly discovered the principles of electromagnetic induction, diamagnetism, and the laws of electrolysis. His inventions of electromagnetic rotary devices formed the foundation of electric motor technology, and it was largely due to his efforts that electricity became practical for use in technology. The SI unit of capacitance, the farad, is named after him.

As a chemist, Faraday discovered benzene and tetrachloroethylene, investigated the clathrate hydrate of chlorine, invented an early form of the Bunsen burner and the system of oxidation numbers, and popularised terminology such as "anode", "cathode", "electrode" and "ion". Faraday ultimately became the first and foremost Fullerian Professor of Chemistry at the Royal Institution, a lifetime position.

Faraday was an experimentalist who conveyed his ideas in clear and simple language, and thought and sensed the physical world in a visual manner, rather than in words or symbols. His mathematical abilities did not extend as far as trigonometry and were limited to the simplest algebra. Physicist and mathematician James Clerk Maxwell took the work of Faraday and others and summarised it in a set of equations which is accepted as the basis of all modern theories of electromagnetic phenomena. On Faraday's uses of lines of force, Maxwell wrote that they show Faraday "to have been in reality a mathematician of a very high order – one from whom the mathematicians of the future may derive valuable and fertile methods."

Faraday devoted considerable time and energy to public service. He worked on optimising lighthouses and protecting ships from corrosion. With Charles Lyell, he produced a forensic investigation on a colliery explosion at Haswell, County Durham, indicating for the first time that coal dust contributed to the severity of the explosion, and demonstrating how ventilation could have prevented it. Faraday also investigated industrial pollution at Swansea, air pollution at the Royal Mint, and wrote to The Times on the foul condition of the River Thames during the Great Stink. He refused to work on developing chemical weapons for use in the Crimean War, citing ethical reservations. He declined to have his lectures published, preferring people to recreate the experiments for themselves, to better experience the discovery, and told a publisher: "I have always loved science more than money and because my occupation is almost entirely personal I cannot afford to get rich."

Albert Einstein kept a portrait of Faraday on his study wall, alongside those of Isaac Newton and Maxwell. Physicist Ernest Rutherford stated, "When we consider the magnitude and extent of his discoveries and their influence on the progress of science and of industry, there is no honour too great to pay to the memory of Faraday, one of the greatest scientific discoverers of all time." He founded the Royal Institution's Friday Evening Discourses and was the main popularizer of its Christmas Lecture Series.

== Biography ==
=== Early life ===
Michael Faraday was born on 22 September 1791 in Newington Butts, Surrey, which is now part of the London Borough of Southwark. His family was not well off. His father, James, was a member of the Glasite sect of Christianity. James Faraday moved his wife, Margaret (née Hastwell), and two children to London during the winter of 1790 from Outhgill in Westmorland, where he had been an apprentice to the village blacksmith. Michael was born in the autumn of the following year, the third of four children. The young Michael Faraday, having only the most basic school education, had to educate himself.

At the age of 14 he became an apprentice to George Riebau, a local bookbinder and bookseller in Blandford Street. During his seven-year apprenticeship Faraday read many books, including Isaac Watts's The Improvement of the Mind, and he enthusiastically implemented the principles and suggestions contained therein. During this period, Faraday held discussions with his peers in the City Philosophical Society, where he attended lectures about various scientific topics. He also developed an interest in science, especially in electricity. Faraday was particularly inspired by the book Conversations on Chemistry by Jane Marcet.

=== Adult life ===
In 1812, at the age of 20 and at the end of his apprenticeship, Faraday attended lectures by the eminent English chemist Humphry Davy of the Royal Institution and the Royal Society, and John Tatum, founder of the City Philosophical Society. Many of the tickets for these lectures were given to Faraday by William Dance, who was one of the founders of the Royal Philharmonic Society. Faraday subsequently sent Davy a 300-page book based on notes that he had taken during these lectures. Davy's reply was immediate, kind, and favourable. In 1813, when Davy damaged his eyesight in an accident with nitrogen trichloride, he decided to hire Michael Faraday as an assistant. Coincidentally, one of the Royal Institution’s assistants, John Payne, had recently been dismissed, and Davy was asked to find a replacement. As a result, Faraday was appointed Chemical Assistant at the Royal Institution on 1 March 1813. Very soon, Davy entrusted Faraday with the preparation of nitrogen trichloride samples, and they both were injured in an explosion of this very sensitive substance.

Faraday married Sarah Barnard (1800–1879) on 12 June 1821. They met through their families at the Sandemanian church, and he confessed his faith to the Sandemanian congregation the month after they were married. They had no children. Faraday was a devout Christian; his Sandemanian denomination was an offshoot of the Church of Scotland. Well after his marriage, he served as deacon and for two terms as an elder in the meeting house of his youth. His church was located at Paul's Alley in the Barbican. This meeting house relocated in 1862 to Barnsbury Grove, Islington; this North London location was where Faraday served the final two years of his second term as elder prior to his resignation from that post. Biographers have noted that "a strong sense of the unity of God and nature pervaded Faraday's life and work."

=== Later life ===
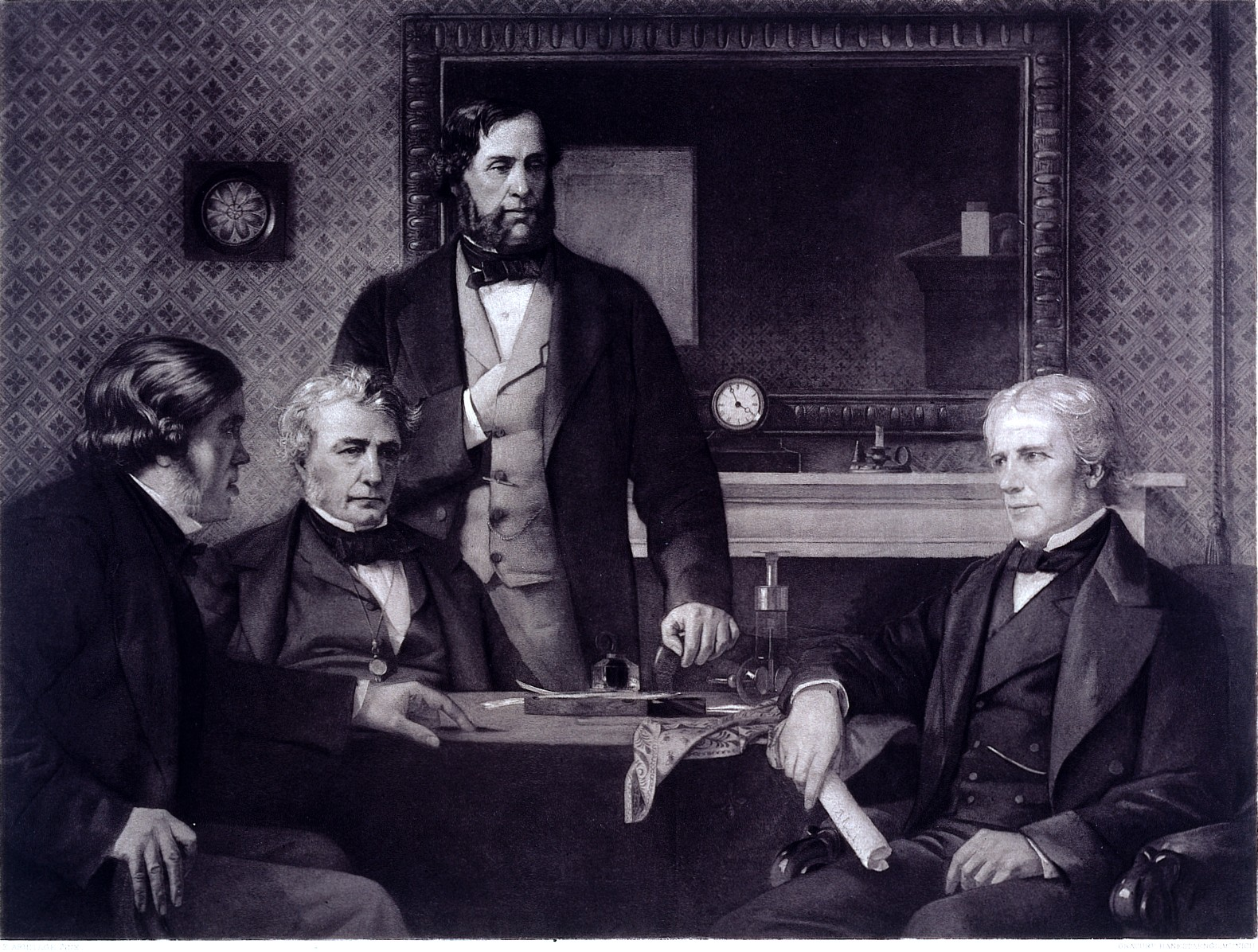
Three Fellows of the Royal Society offering the presidency to Faraday (right) in 1857

In June 1832, the University of Oxford granted Faraday an honorary Doctor of Civil Law degree. During his lifetime, he was offered a knighthood in recognition for his services to science, which he turned down on religious grounds, believing that it was against the word of the Bible to accumulate riches and pursue worldly reward, and stating that he preferred to remain "plain Mr Faraday to the end". Elected a Fellow of the Royal Society in 1824, he twice refused to become President. He became the first Fullerian Professor of Chemistry at the Royal Institution in 1833.

In 1832, Faraday was elected a Foreign Honorary Member of the American Academy of Arts and Sciences. He was elected a foreign member of the Royal Swedish Academy of Sciences in 1838. In 1840, he was elected to the American Philosophical Society. He was one of eight foreign members elected to the French Academy of Sciences in 1844. In 1849 he was elected as associated member to the Royal Institute of the Netherlands, which two years later became the Royal Netherlands Academy of Arts and Sciences and he was subsequently made foreign member.

Faraday had a nervous breakdown in 1839 but eventually returned to his investigations into electromagnetism. In 1848, as a result of representations by the Prince Consort, Faraday was awarded a grace and favour house in Hampton Court in Middlesex, free of all expenses and upkeep. This was the Master Mason's House, later called Faraday House, and now No. 37 Hampton Court Road. In 1858 Faraday retired to live there.

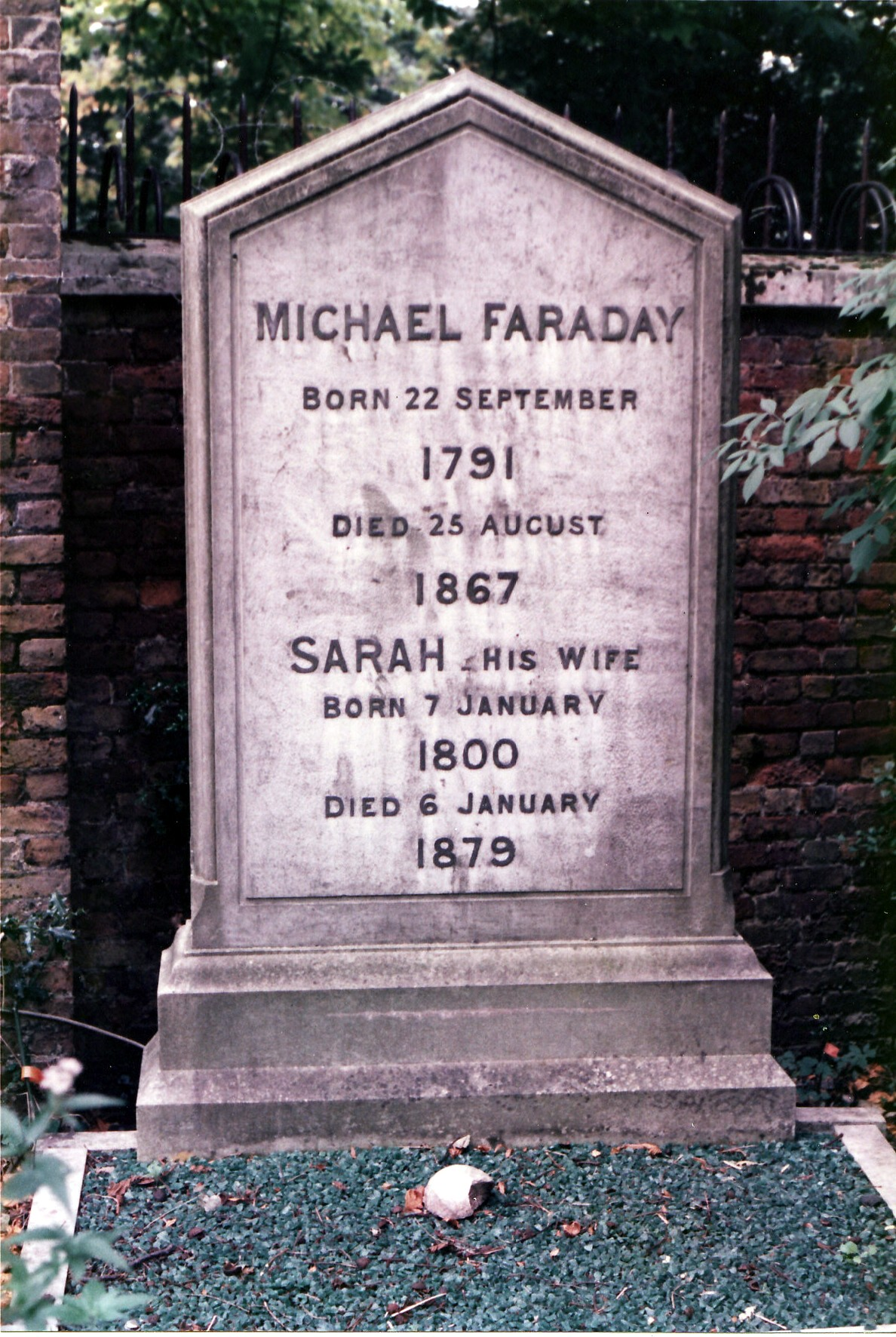
Faraday's grave at Highgate Cemetery, north London

Having provided a number of various service projects for the British government, when asked by the government to advise on the production of chemical weapons for use in the Crimean War (1853–1856), Faraday refused to participate, citing ethical reasons. He also refused offers to publish his lectures, believing that they would lose impact if not accompanied by the live experiments. His reply to an offer from a publisher in a letter ends with: "I have always loved science more than money & because my occupation is almost entirely personal I cannot afford to get rich."

Faraday died at his house at Hampton Court on 25 August 1867, aged 75. He had some years before turned down an offer of burial in Westminster Abbey upon his death, but he has a memorial plaque there, near Isaac Newton's tomb. Faraday was interred in the dissenters' (non-Anglican) section of Highgate Cemetery.

== Scientific achievements ==
=== Chemistry ===
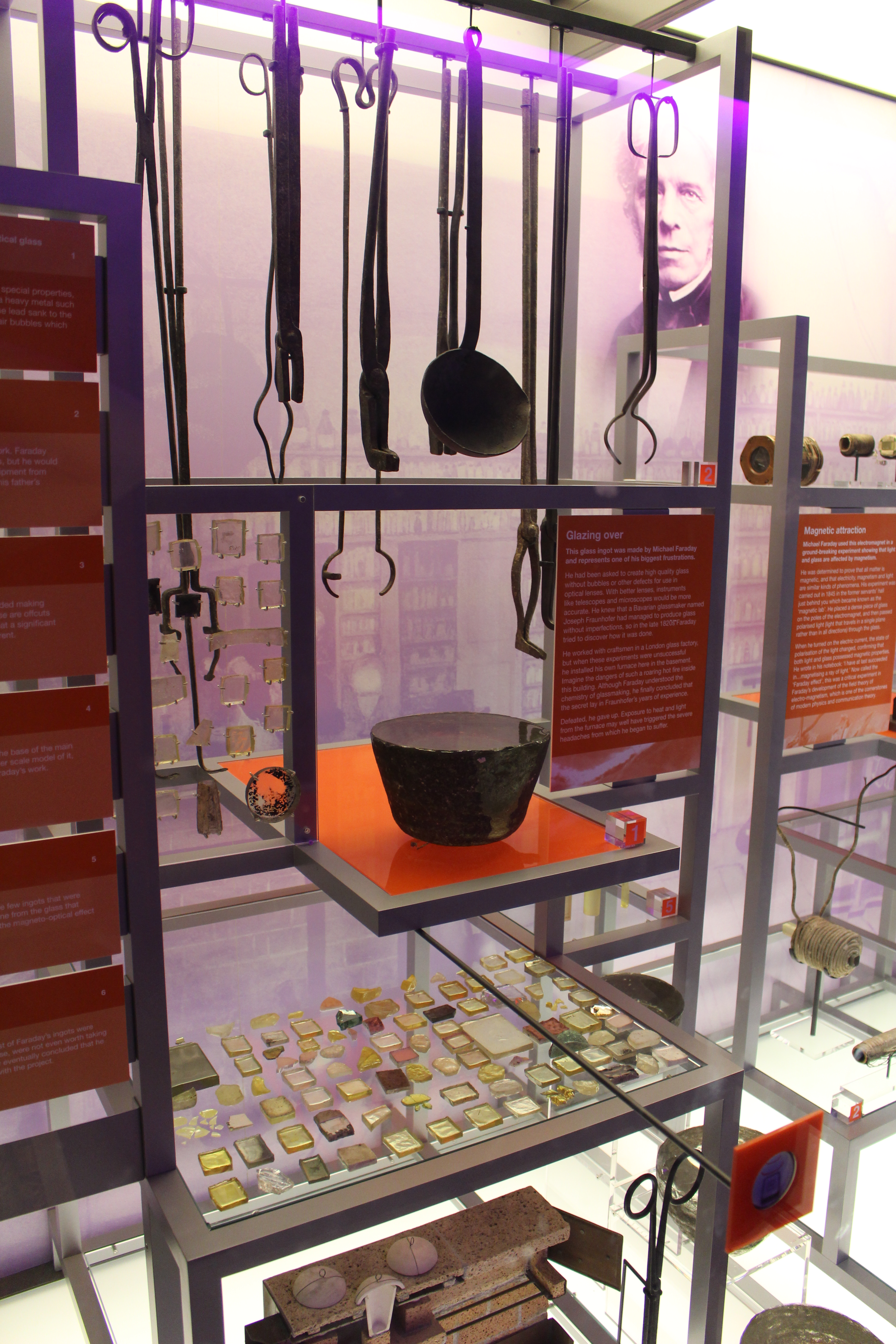
Equipment used by Faraday to make glass on display at the Royal Institution in London

Faraday's earliest chemical work was as an assistant to Humphry Davy. Faraday was involved in the study of chlorine; he discovered two new compounds of chlorine and carbon: hexachloroethane which he made via the chlorination of ethylene and tetrachloroethylene from the decomposition of the former. He also conducted the first rough experiments on the diffusion of gases, a phenomenon that was first pointed out by John Dalton. The physical importance of this phenomenon was more fully revealed by Thomas Graham and Joseph Loschmidt. Faraday succeeded in liquefying several gases, investigated the alloys of steel, and produced several new kinds of glass intended for optical purposes. A specimen of one of these heavy glasses subsequently became historically important; when the glass was placed in a magnetic field Faraday determined the rotation of the plane of polarisation of light. This specimen was also the first substance found to be repelled by the poles of a magnet.

Faraday invented an early form of what was to become the Bunsen burner, which is still in practical use in science laboratories around the world as a convenient source of heat. Faraday worked extensively in the field of chemistry, discovering chemical substances such as benzene (which he called bicarburet of hydrogen) and liquefying gases such as chlorine. The liquefying of gases helped to establish that gases are the vapours of liquids possessing a very low boiling point and gave a more solid basis to the concept of molecular aggregation. In 1820 Faraday reported the first synthesis of compounds made from carbon and chlorine, hexachloroethane and perchloroethylene, and published his results the following year. Faraday also determined the composition of the chlorine clathrate hydrate, which had been discovered by Humphry Davy in 1810. Faraday is also responsible for discovering the laws of electrolysis, and for popularising terminology such as anode, cathode, electrode, and ion, terms proposed in large part by William Whewell.

Faraday was the first to report what later came to be called metallic nanoparticles. In 1857 he discovered that the optical properties of gold colloids differed from those of the corresponding bulk metal. This was probably the first reported observation of the effects of quantum size, and might be considered to be the birth of nanoscience.

=== Electricity and magnetism ===
Faraday is best known for his work on electricity and magnetism. His first recorded experiment was the construction of a voltaic pile with seven British halfpenny coins, stacked together with seven discs of sheet zinc, and six pieces of paper moistened with salt water. With this pile he passed the electric current through a solution of sulfate of magnesia and succeeded in decomposing the chemical compound (recorded in first letter to Abbott, 12 July 1812).

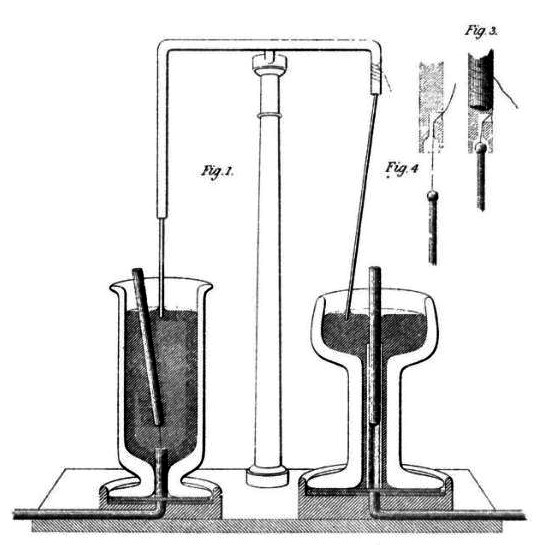
Electromagnetic rotation experiment of Faraday, 1821, the first demonstration of the conversion of electrical energy into motion

In 1821, soon after the Danish physicist and chemist Hans Christian Ørsted discovered the phenomenon of electromagnetism, Davy and William Hyde Wollaston tried, but failed, to design an electric motor. Faraday, having discussed the problem with the two men, went on to build two devices to produce what he called "electromagnetic rotation". One of these, now known as the homopolar motor, caused a continuous circular motion that was engendered by the circular magnetic force around a wire that extended into a pool of mercury wherein was placed a magnet; the wire would then rotate around the magnet if supplied with current from a chemical battery. These experiments and inventions formed the foundation of modern electromagnetic technology. In his excitement, Faraday published results without acknowledging his work with either Wollaston or Davy. The resulting controversy within the Royal Society strained his mentor relationship with Davy and may well have contributed to Faraday's assignment to other activities, which consequently prevented his involvement in electromagnetic research for several years.

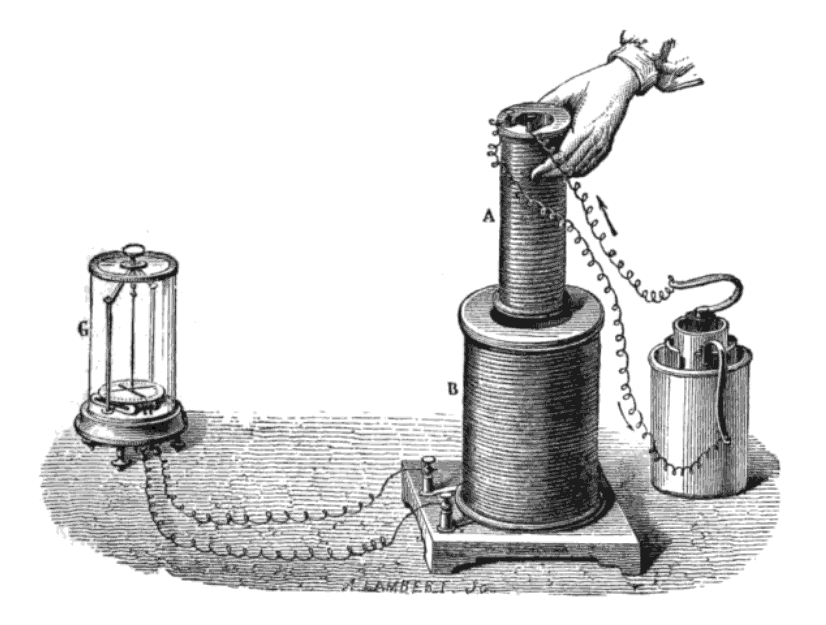
One of Faraday's 1831 experiments demonstrating induction. The liquid battery (right) sends an electric current through the small coil (A). When it is moved in or out of the large coil (B), its magnetic field induces a momentary voltage in the coil, which is detected by the galvanometer (G).

From his initial discovery in 1821, Faraday continued his laboratory work, exploring electromagnetic properties of materials and developing requisite experience. In 1824, Faraday briefly set up a circuit to study whether a magnetic field could regulate the flow of a current in an adjacent wire, but he found no such relationship. This experiment followed similar work conducted with light and magnets three years earlier that yielded identical results. During the next seven years, Faraday spent much of his time perfecting his recipe for optical quality (heavy) glass, borosilicate of lead, which he used in his future studies connecting light with magnetism. In his spare time, Faraday continued publishing his experimental work on optics and electromagnetism; he conducted correspondence with scientists whom he had met on his journeys across Europe with Davy, and who were also working on electromagnetism. Two years after the death of Davy, in 1831, he began his great series of experiments in which he discovered electromagnetic induction, recording in his laboratory diary on 28 October 1831 that he was "making many experiments with the great magnet of the Royal Society".

A diagram of Faraday's iron ring-coil apparatus

Faraday's breakthrough came when he wrapped two insulated coils of wire around an iron ring, and found that, upon passing a current through one coil, a momentary current was induced in the other coil. This phenomenon is now known as mutual inductance. The iron ring-coil apparatus is still on display at the Royal Institution. In subsequent experiments, he found that if he moved a magnet through a loop of wire an electric current flowed in that wire. The current also flowed if the loop was moved over a stationary magnet. His demonstrations established that a changing magnetic field produces an electric field; this relation was modelled mathematically by James Clerk Maxwell as Faraday's law, which subsequently became one of the four Maxwell equations, and which have in turn evolved into the generalization known today as field theory. Faraday would later use the principles he had discovered to construct the electric dynamo, the ancestor of modern power generators and the electric motor.

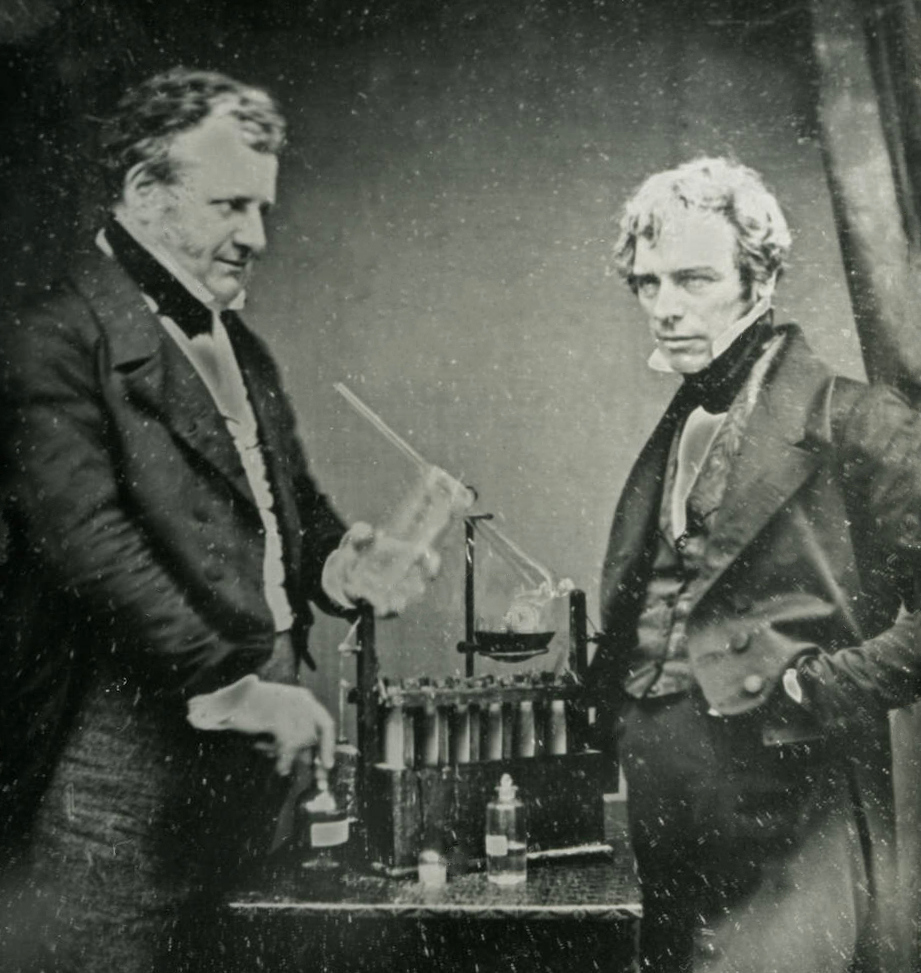
John Daniell (left) and Farday (right), founders of electrochemistry

In 1832, he completed a series of experiments aimed at investigating the fundamental nature of electricity; Faraday used "static", batteries, and "animal electricity" to produce the phenomena of electrostatic attraction, electrolysis, magnetism, etc. He concluded that, contrary to the scientific opinion of the time, the divisions between the various "kinds" of electricity were illusory. Faraday instead proposed that only a single "electricity" exists, and the changing values of quantity and intensity (current and voltage) would produce different groups of phenomena.

Near the end of his career, Faraday proposed that electromagnetic forces extended into the empty space around the conductor. This idea was rejected by his fellow scientists, and Faraday did not live to see the eventual acceptance of his proposition by the scientific community. It would be another half a century before electricity was used in technology, with the West End's Savoy Theatre, fitted with the incandescent light bulb developed by Sir Joseph Swan, the first public building in the world to be lit by electricity. As recorded by the Royal Institution, "Faraday invented the generator in 1831 but it took nearly 50 years before all the technology, including Joseph Swan's incandescent filament light bulbs used here, came into common use".

=== Diamagnetism ===
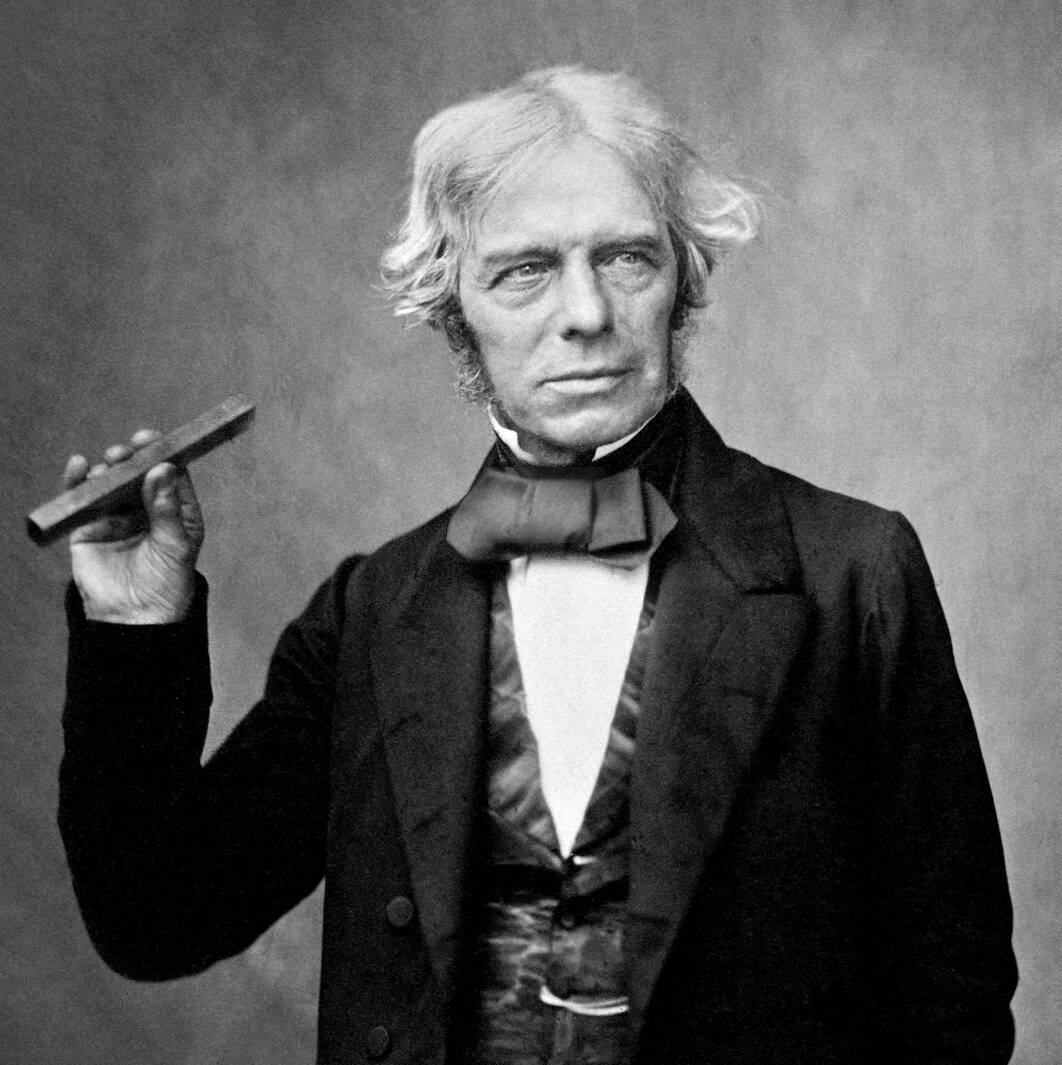
Faraday holding a type of glass bar he used in 1845 to show magnetism affects light in dielectric material

In 1845, Faraday discovered that many materials exhibit a weak repulsion from a magnetic field: an effect he termed diamagnetism.

Faraday also discovered that the plane of polarization of linearly polarised light can be rotated by the application of an external magnetic field aligned with the direction in which the light is moving. This is now termed the Faraday effect. In Sept 1845 he wrote in his notebook, "I have at last succeeded in illuminating a magnetic curve or line of force and in magnetising a ray of light".

Later on in his life, in 1862, Faraday used a spectroscope to search for a different alteration of light, the change of spectral lines by an applied magnetic field. The equipment available to him was, however, insufficient for a definite determination of spectral change. Pieter Zeeman later used an improved apparatus to study the same phenomenon, publishing his results in 1897 and receiving the 1902 Nobel Prize in Physics for his success. In both his 1897 paper and his Nobel acceptance speech, Zeeman made reference to Faraday's work.

==== Faraday cage ====
In his work on static electricity, Faraday's ice pail experiment demonstrated that the charge resided only on the exterior of a charged conductor, and exterior charge had no influence on anything enclosed within a conductor. This is because the exterior charges redistribute such that the interior fields emerging from them cancel one another. This shielding effect is used in what is now known as a Faraday cage. In January 1836, Faraday had put a wooden frame, 12 ft square, on four glass supports and added paper walls and wire mesh. He then stepped inside and electrified it. When he stepped out of his electrified cage, Faraday had shown that electricity was a force, not an imponderable fluid as was believed at the time.

== Royal Institution and public service ==
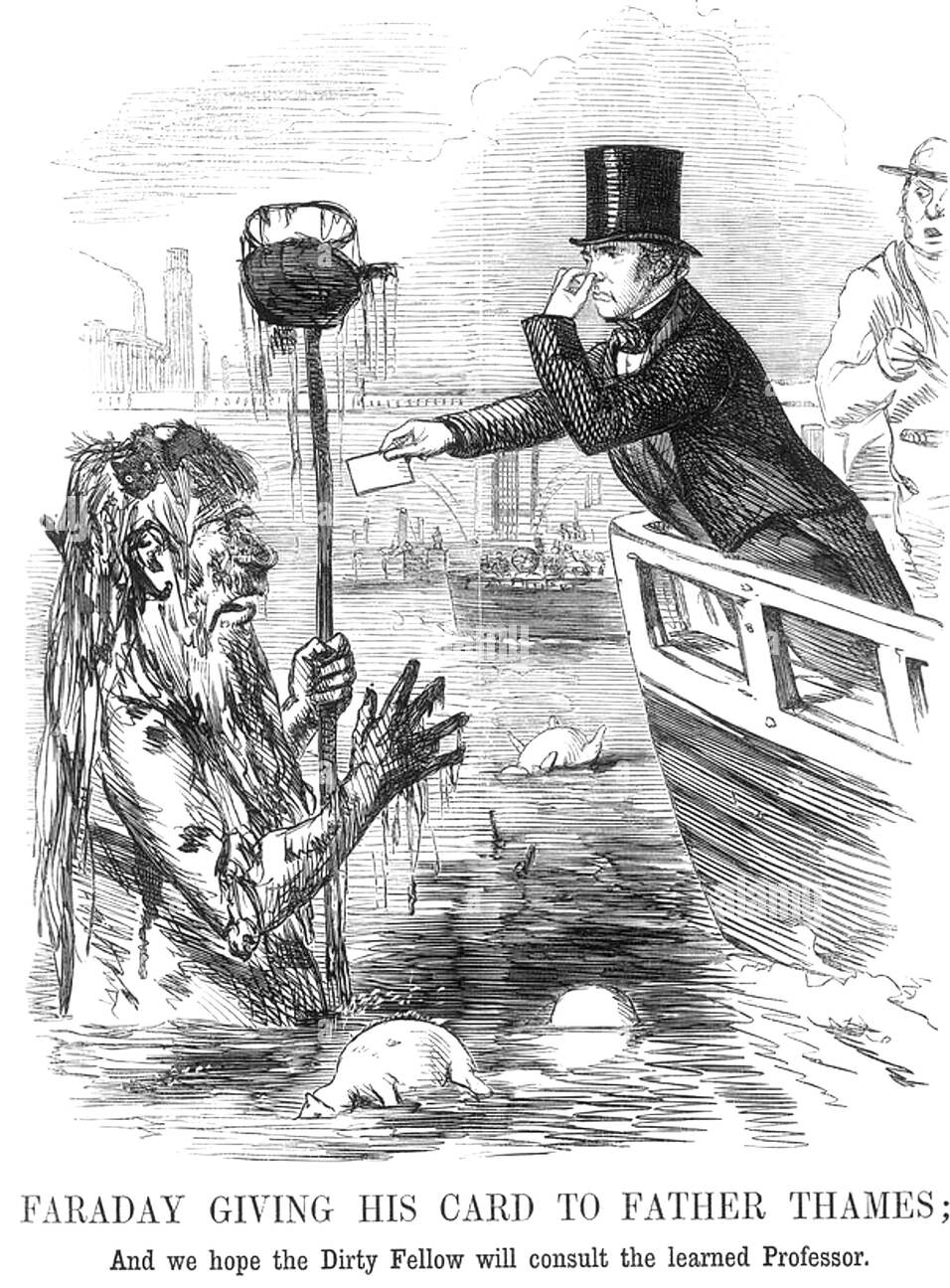
Michael Faraday meets Father Thames, from Punch (21 July 1855).

Faraday had a long association with the Royal Institution of Great Britain. He was appointed Assistant Superintendent of the House of the Royal Institution in 1821. He was elected a Fellow of the Royal Society in 1824. In 1825, he became Director of the Laboratory of the Royal Institution. Six years later, in 1833, Faraday became the first Fullerian Professor of Chemistry at the Royal Institution of Great Britain, a position to which he was appointed for life without the obligation to deliver lectures. His sponsor and mentor was John 'Mad Jack' Fuller, who created the position at the Royal Institution for Faraday.

Beyond his scientific research into areas such as chemistry, electricity, and magnetism at the Royal Institution, Faraday undertook numerous, and often time-consuming, service projects for private enterprise and the British government. From as early as 1820, he applied his scientific knowledge to investigate the cause of a refinery fire for the Severn and King Trial. Major projects that followed included investigations of explosions in coal mines, being an expert witness in court, and along with two engineers from Chance Brothers c. 1853, the preparation of high-quality optical glass, which was required by Chance for its lighthouses. In 1846, together with Charles Lyell, he produced a lengthy and detailed report on a serious explosion in the colliery at Haswell, County Durham, which killed 95 miners. Their report was a meticulous forensic investigation and indicated that coal dust contributed to the severity of the explosion — the first time explosions had been linked to dust. Faraday gave a demonstration during a lecture on how ventilation could prevent it. The report should have warned coal owners of the hazard of coal dust explosions, but the risk was ignored for over 60 years until the 1913 Senghenydd Colliery Disaster.

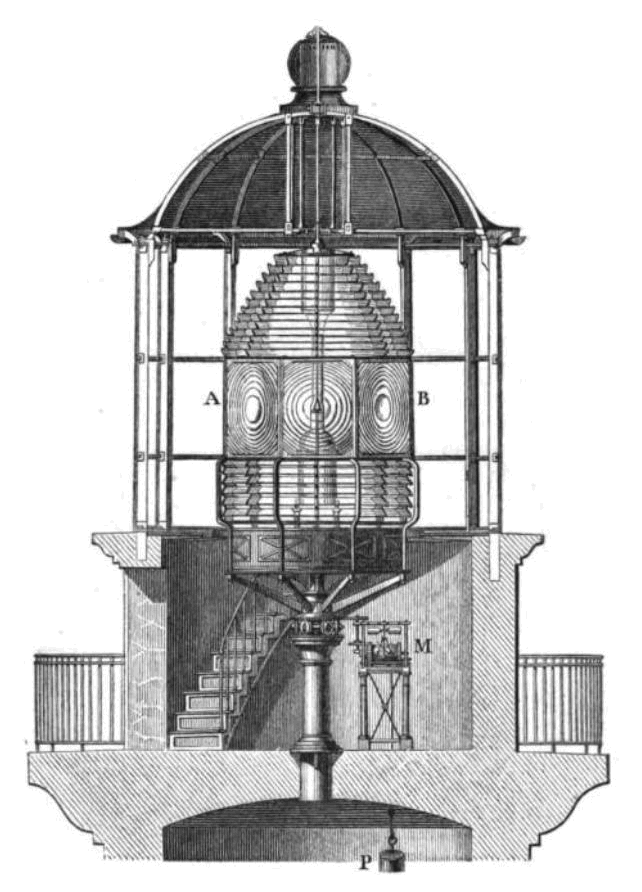
Lighthouse lantern room from mid-1800s

As a scientist in a nation with maritime interests, Faraday spent extensive amounts of time on projects such as the construction and operation of lighthouses and protecting the bottoms of ships from corrosion. His workshop still stands at Trinity Buoy Wharf above the Chain and Buoy Store, next to London's only lighthouse where he carried out the first experiments in electric lighting for lighthouses.

Faraday was also active in what would now be called environmental science, or engineering. He investigated industrial pollution at Swansea and was consulted on air pollution at the Royal Mint. In July 1855, Faraday wrote a letter to The Times on the subject of the foul condition of the River Thames, which resulted in an often-reprinted cartoon in Punch. (See also The Great Stink).

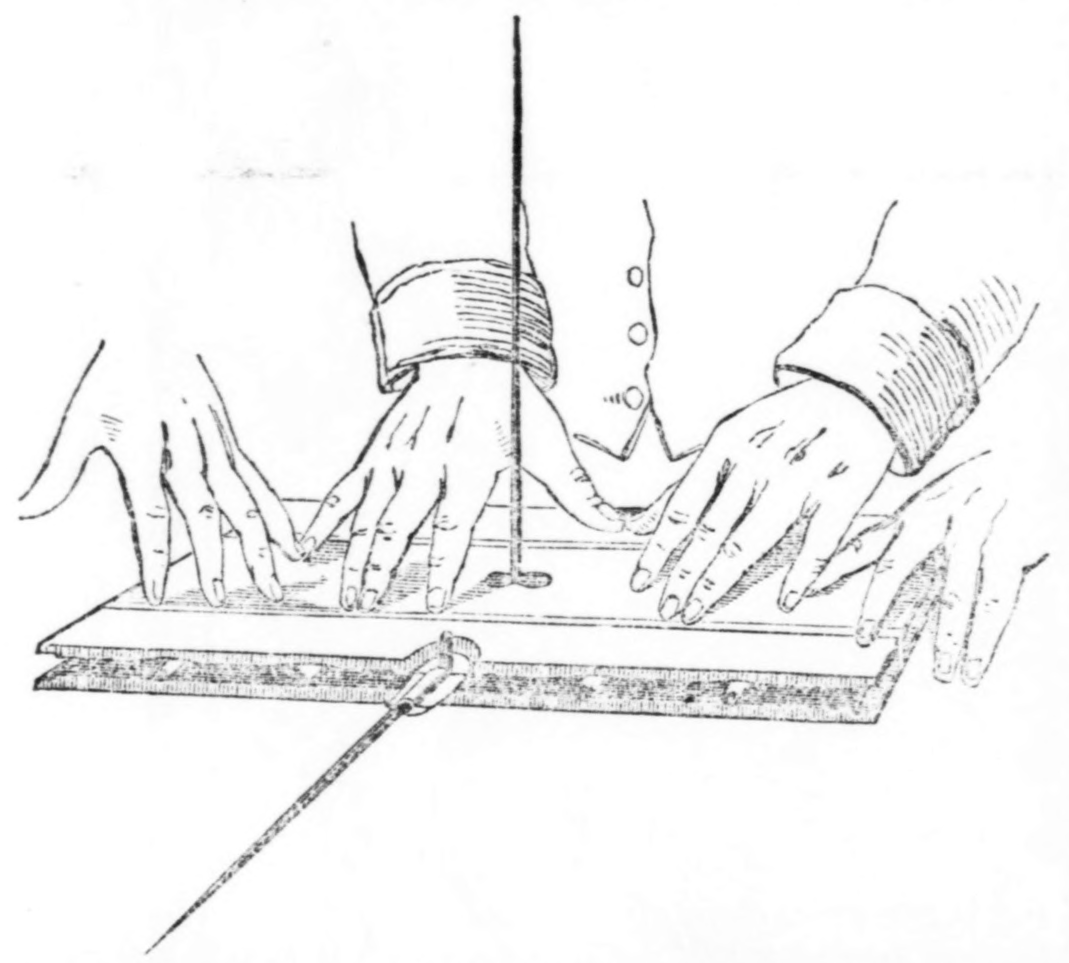
Faraday's apparatus for experimental demonstration of ideomotor effect on table-turning

Faraday assisted with the planning and judging of exhibits for the Great Exhibition of 1851 in Hyde Park, London. He also advised the National Gallery on the cleaning and protection of its art collection, and served on the National Gallery Site Commission in 1857. Education was another of Faraday's areas of service; he lectured on the topic in 1854 at the Royal Institution, and, in 1862, he appeared before a Public Schools Commission to give his views on education in Great Britain. Faraday also weighed in negatively on the public's fascination with table-turning, mesmerism, and seances, and in so doing chastised both the public and the nation's educational system.

Before his famous Christmas lectures, Faraday delivered chemistry lectures for the City Philosophical Society from 1816 to 1818 in order to refine the quality of his lectures. These were the only lectures he gave outside the Royal Institution.

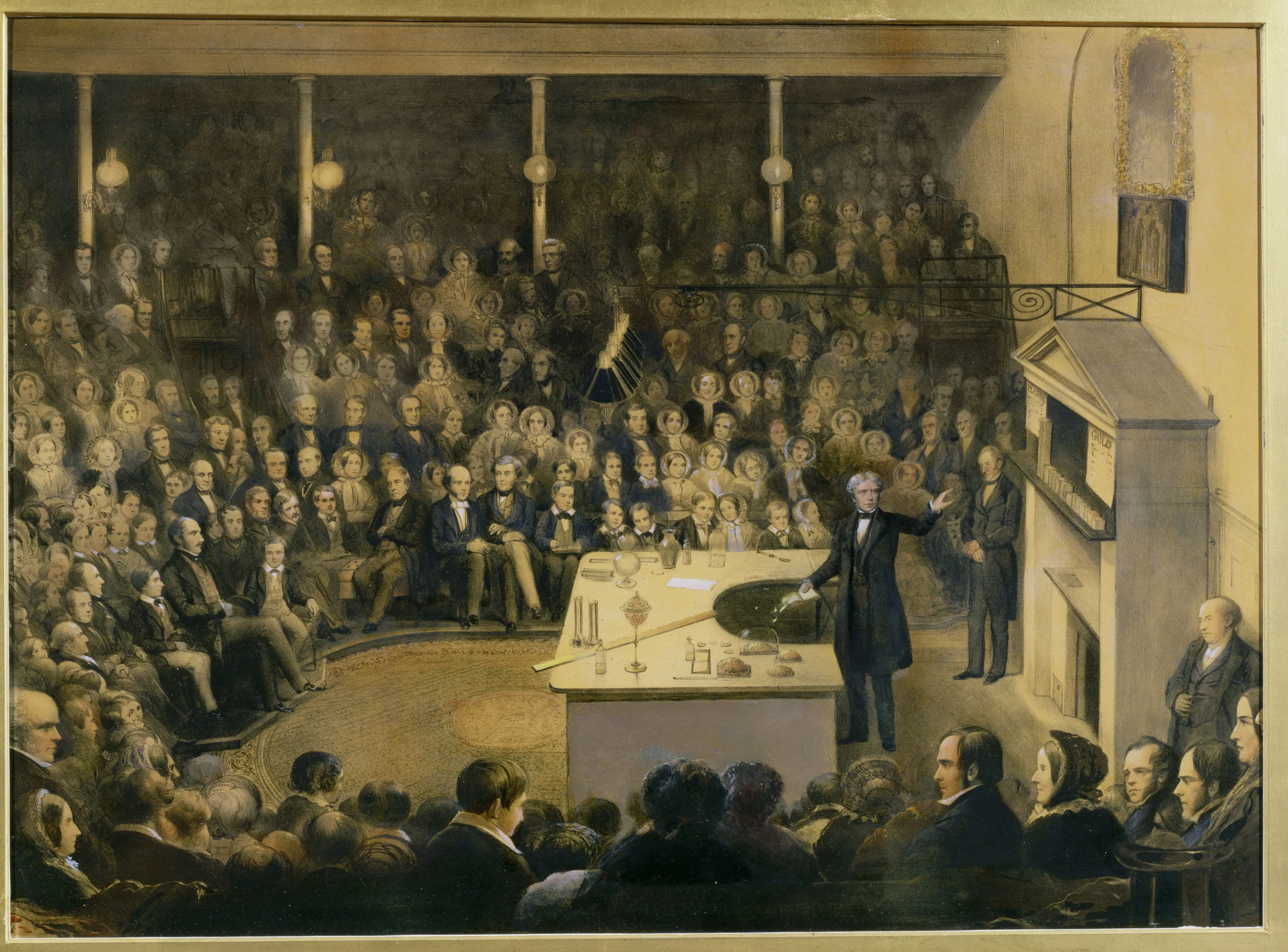
Faraday (standing behind a desk) delivering a Christmas Lecture to the general public at the Royal Institution in 1856

Between 1827 and 1860 at the Royal Institution in London, Faraday gave a series of nineteen Christmas lectures for young people, a series which continues today. The objective of the lectures was to present science to specifically to young people (and the general public) in the hopes of inspiring them, as well and generating revenue for the Royal Institution. He also founded the Friday Evening Discourses in 1825, where lecturers would present their latest research to members. Both series were notable events on the social calendar among London's gentry, and were propelled by Faraday's lecturing skills. Over the course of several letters to his close friend Benjamin Abbott, Faraday outlined his recommendations on the art of lecturing, writing "a flame should be lighted at the commencement and kept alive with unremitting splendour to the end". His lectures were joyful and juvenile, he delighted in filling soap bubbles with various gasses (in order to determine whether or not they are magnetic), but the lectures were also deeply philosophical. In his lectures he urged his audiences to consider the mechanics of his experiments: "you know very well that ice floats upon water ... Why does the ice float? Think of that, and philosophise". The subjects in his lectures consisted of Chemistry and Electricity, and included: 1841: The Rudiments of Chemistry, 1843: First Principles of Electricity, 1848: The Chemical History of a Candle, 1851: Attractive Forces, 1853: Voltaic Electricity, 1854: The Chemistry of Combustion, 1855: The Distinctive Properties of the Common Metals, 1857: Static Electricity, 1858: The Metallic Properties, 1859: The Various Forces of Matter and their Relations to Each Other.

== Commemorations ==
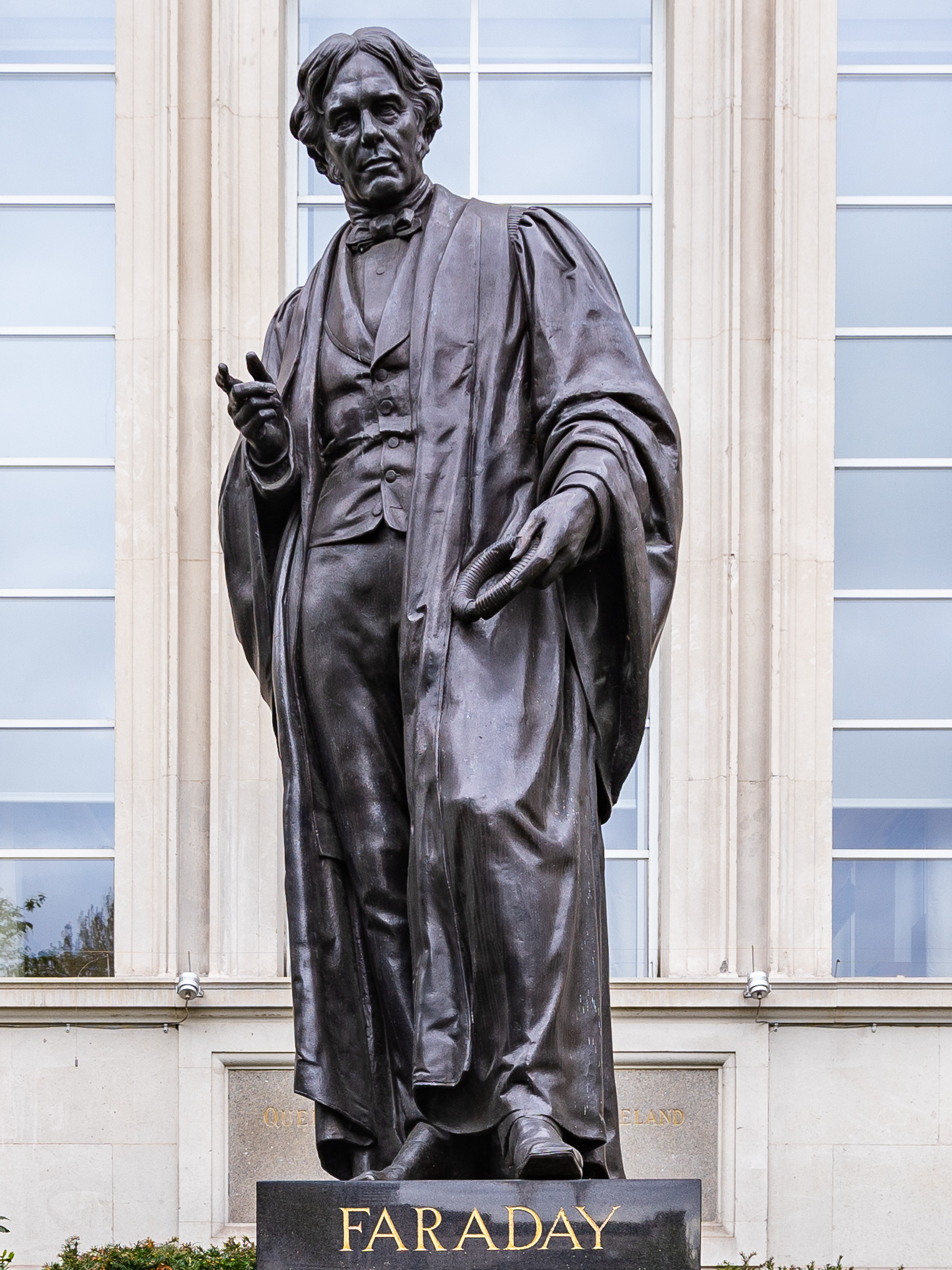
Statue of Faraday in Savoy Place, London. Sculptor John Henry Foley.

A statue of Michael Faraday stands in Savoy Place, along Victoria Embankment, London, outside the Institution of Engineering and Technology. The Faraday Memorial, designed by brutalist architect Rodney Gordon and completed in 1961, is at the Elephant & Castle gyratory system, near Faraday's birthplace at Newington Butts, London. Faraday School is located on Trinity Buoy Wharf where his workshop still stands above the Chain and Buoy Store, next to London's only lighthouse. Faraday Gardens is a small park in Walworth, London, not far from his birthplace at Newington Butts. It lies within the local council ward of Faraday in the London Borough of Southwark. Michael Faraday Primary school is situated on the Aylesbury Estate in Walworth.

A building at London South Bank University, which houses the institute's electrical engineering departments is named the Faraday Wing, due to its proximity to Faraday's birthplace in Newington Butts. A hall at Loughborough University was named after Faraday in 1960. Near the entrance to its dining hall is a bronze casting, which depicts the symbol of an electrical transformer, and inside there hangs a portrait, both in Faraday's honour. An eight-storey building at the University of Edinburgh's science & engineering campus is named for Faraday, as is a recently built hall of accommodation at Brunel University, the main engineering building at Swansea University, and the instructional and experimental physics building at Northern Illinois University. The former UK Faraday Station in Antarctica was named after him.

Without such freedom there would have been no Shakespeare, no Goethe, no Newton, no Faraday, no Pasteur and no Lister.

— Albert Einstein's speech on intellectual freedom at the Royal Albert Hall, London having fled Nazi Germany, 3 October 1933

Streets named for Faraday can be found in many British cities (e.g., London, Glenrothes, Swindon, Basingstoke, Nottingham, Whitby, Kirkby, Crawley, Newbury, Swansea, Aylesbury and Stevenage) as well as in France (Paris), Germany (Berlin-Dahlem, Hermsdorf), Canada (Quebec City, Quebec; Deep River, Ontario; Ottawa, Ontario), the United States (The Bronx, New York and Reston, Virginia), Malaysia (Penang and Kuala Lumpur), Australia (Carlton, Victoria), and New Zealand (Hawke's Bay).

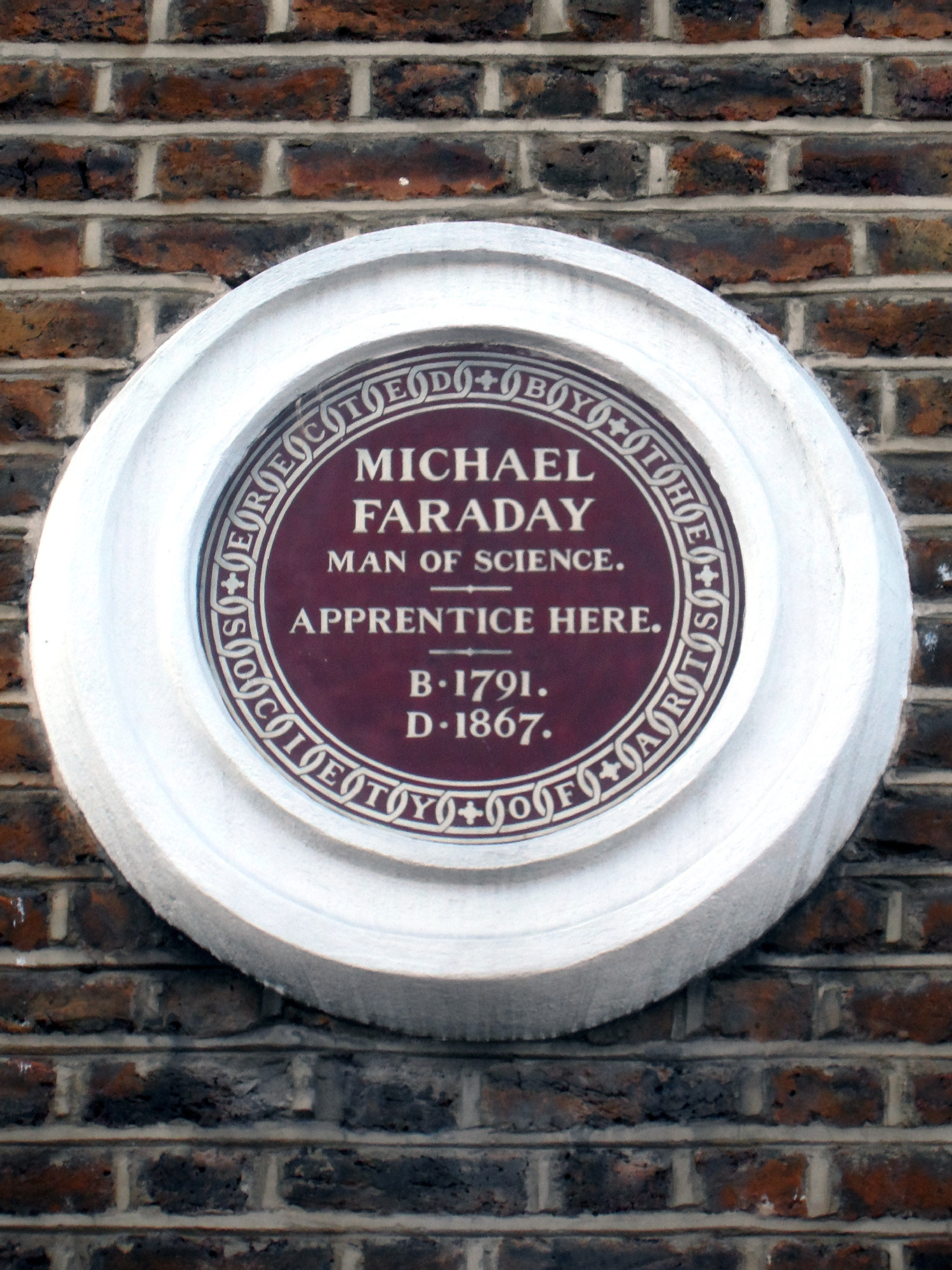
Plaque erected in 1876 by the Royal Society of Arts in Marylebone, London

A Royal Society of Arts blue plaque, unveiled in 1876, commemorates Faraday at 48 Blandford Street in London's Marylebone district. From 1991 until 2001, Faraday's picture featured on the reverse of Series E £20 banknotes issued by the Bank of England. He was portrayed conducting a lecture at the Royal Institution with the magneto-electric spark apparatus. In 2002, Faraday was ranked number 22 in the BBC's list of the 100 Greatest Britons following a UK-wide vote.

Faraday has been commemorated on postage stamps issued by the Royal Mail. In 1991, as a pioneer of electricity he featured in their Scientific Achievements issue along with pioneers in three other fields (Charles Babbage (computing), Frank Whittle (jet engine) and Robert Watson-Watt (radar). In 1999, under the title "Faraday's Electricity", he featured in their issue along with Charles Darwin, Edward Jenner and Alan Turing.

The Faraday Institute for Science and Religion derives its name from the scientist, who saw his faith as integral to his scientific research. The logo of the institute is also based on Faraday's discoveries. It was created in 2006 by a $2,000,000 grant from the John Templeton Foundation to carry out academic research, to foster understanding of the interaction between science and religion, and to engage public understanding in both these subject areas.

The Faraday Institution, an independent energy storage research institute established in 2017, also derives its name from Michael Faraday. The organisation serves as the UK's primary research programme to advance battery science and technology, education, public engagement and market research.

Faraday's life and contributions to electromagnetics was the principal topic of "The Electric Boy", the tenth episode of the 2014 American science documentary series Cosmos: A Spacetime Odyssey, which was broadcast on Fox and the National Geographic Channel.

The writer Aldous Huxley wrote about Faraday in an essay entitled, A Night in Pietramala: "He is always the natural philosopher. To discover truth is his sole aim and interest ... even if I could be Shakespeare, I think I should still choose to be Faraday." Calling Faraday her "hero", in a speech to the Royal Society, Margaret Thatcher declared: "The value of his work must be higher than the capitalisation of all the shares on the Stock Exchange!" She borrowed his bust from the Royal Institution and had it placed in the hall of 10 Downing Street.

== Awards named in Faraday's honour ==
In honor and remembrance of his great scientific contributions, several institutions have created prizes and awards in his name. This include:

- The IET Faraday Medal
- The Royal Society of London Michael Faraday Prize
- The Institute of Physics Michael Faraday Medal and Prize
- The Royal Society of Chemistry Faraday Lectureship Prize

== Gallery ==
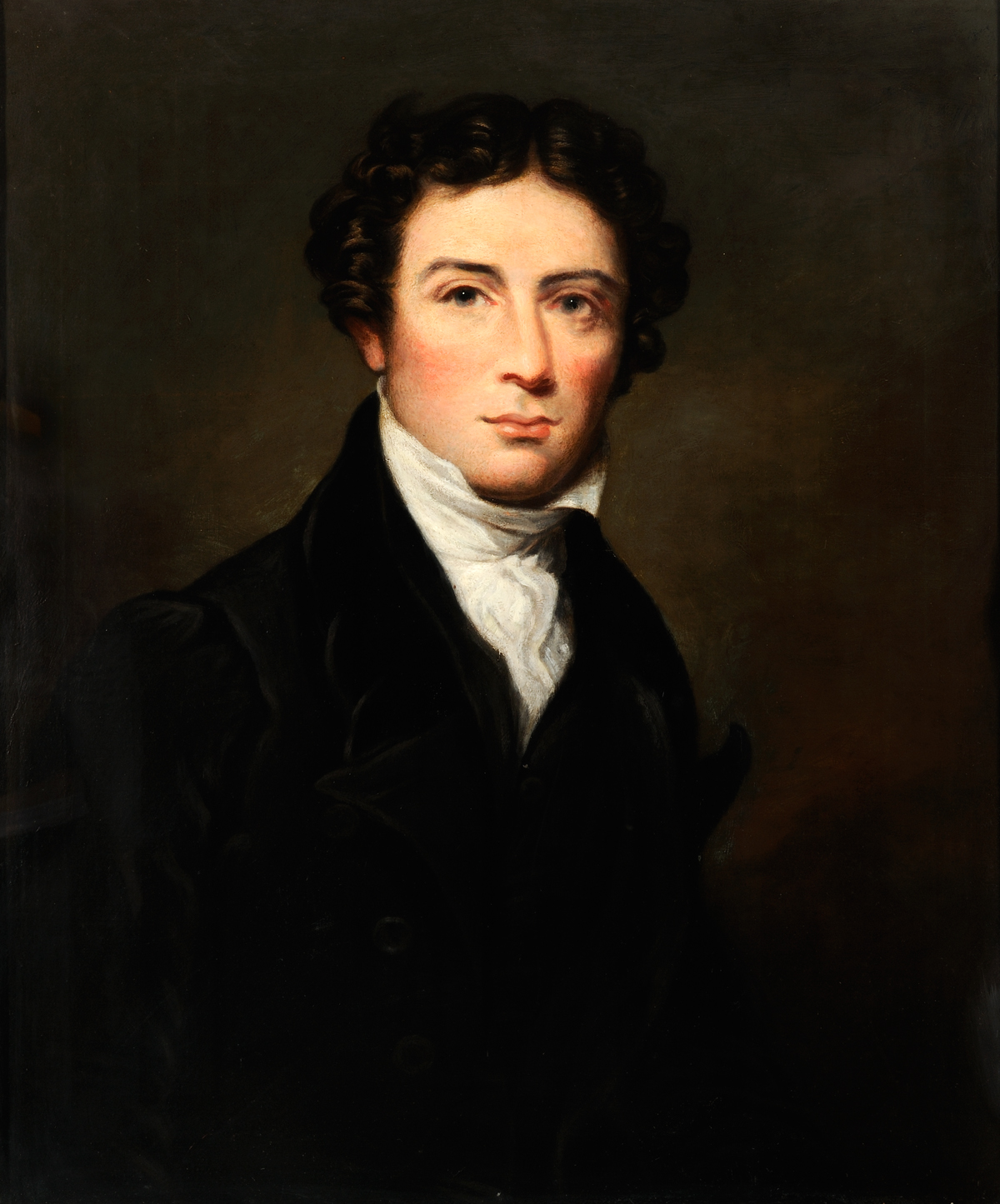
Portrait of young Michael Faraday, c. 1826

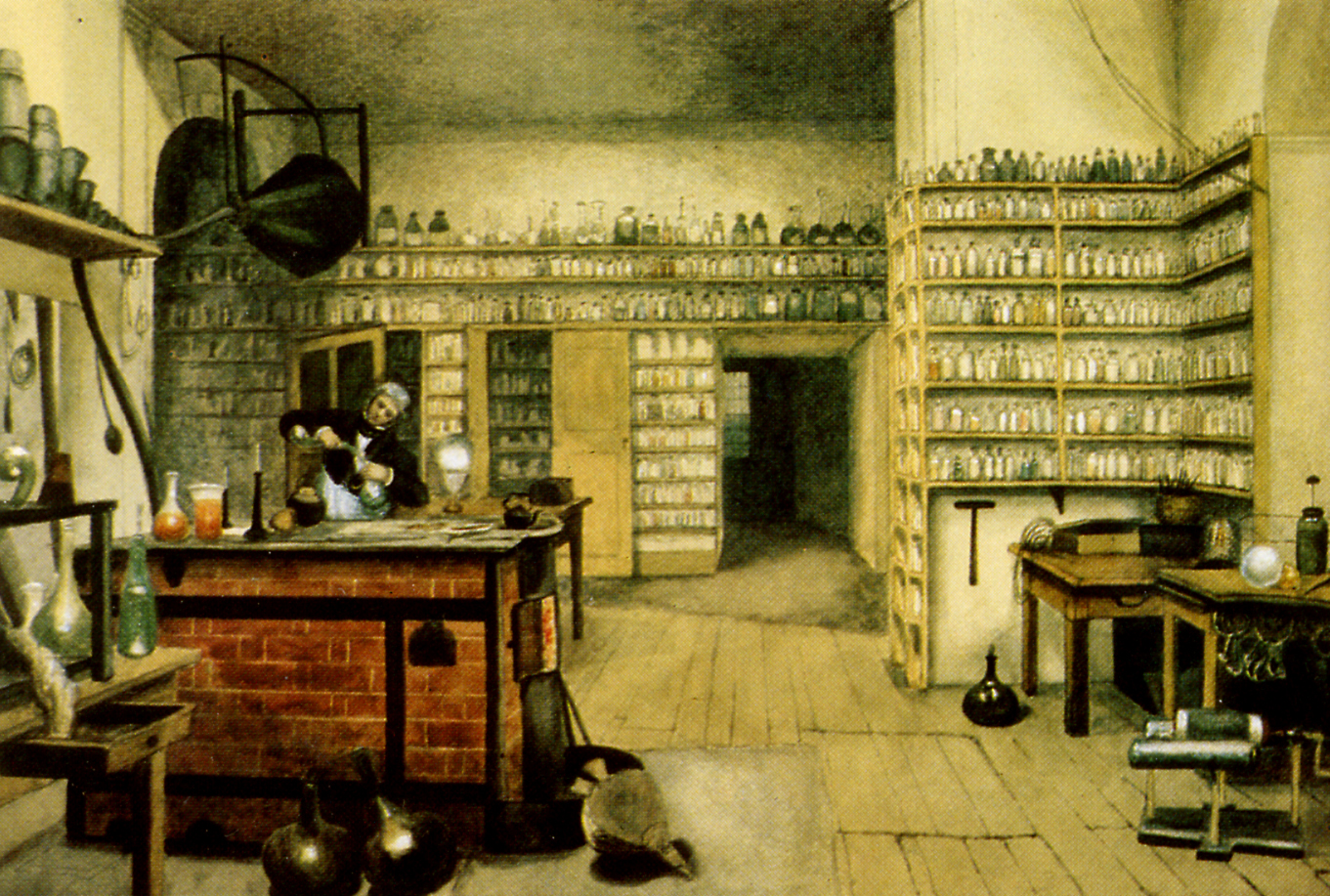
Michael Faraday in his laboratory, c. 1850s

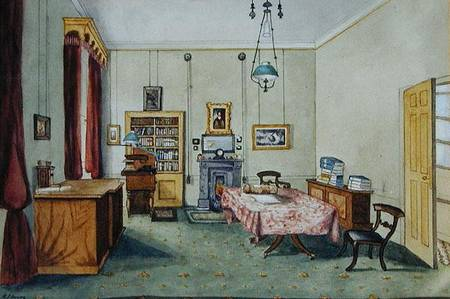
Michael Faraday's study at the Royal Institution

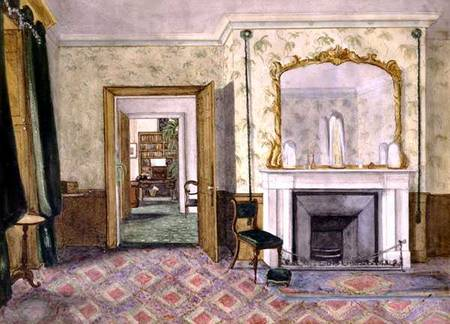
Michael Faraday's flat at the Royal Institution

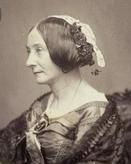
Artist Harriet Jane Moore who documented Faraday's life in watercolours

== Bibliography ==
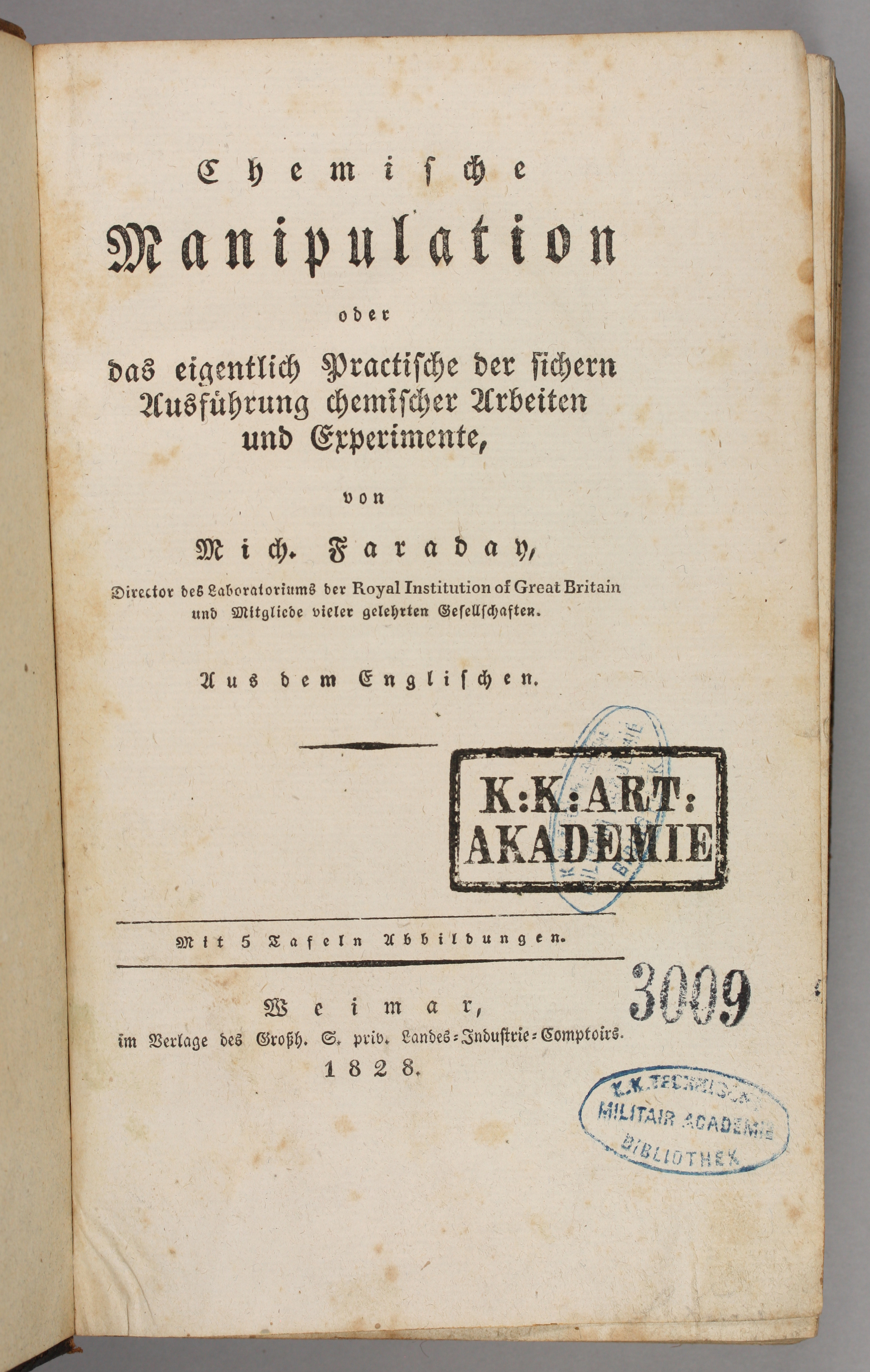
Chemische Manipulation, 1828

Faraday's books, with the exception of Chemical Manipulation, were collections of scientific papers or transcriptions of lectures. Since his death, Faraday's diary has been published, as have several large volumes of his letters and Faraday's journal from his travels with Davy in 1813–1815.

- Faraday, Michael (1827). Chemical Manipulation, Being Instructions to Students in Chemistry. John Murray. 2nd ed. 1830, 3rd ed. 1842
- Faraday, Michael (1839). Experimental Researches in Electricity, vols. i. and ii. Richard and John Edward Taylor.; vol. iii. Richard Taylor and William Francis, 1855
- Faraday, Michael (1859). Experimental Researches in Chemistry and Physics. Taylor and Francis. ISBN 978-0-85066-841-4.
- Faraday, Michael (1861). W. Crookes (ed.). A Course of Six Lectures on the Chemical History of a Candle. Griffin, Bohn & Co. ISBN 978-1-4255-1974-2.
- Faraday, Michael (1873). W. Crookes (ed.). On the Various Forces in Nature. Chatto and Windus.
- Faraday, Michael (1932–1936). T. Martin (ed.). Diary. G. Bell. ISBN 978-0-7135-0439-2 – published in eight volumes; see also the 2009 publication of Faraday's diary
- Faraday, Michael (1991). B. Bowers and L. Symons (ed.). Curiosity Perfectly Satisfyed: Faraday's Travels in Europe 1813–1815. Institution of Electrical Engineers.
- Faraday, Michael (1991). F.A.J.L. James (ed.). The Correspondence of Michael Faraday. Vol. 1. INSPEC, Inc. ISBN 978-0-86341-248-6. – vol. 2, 1993; vol. 3, 1996; vol. 4, 1999
- Faraday, Michael (2008). Alice Jenkins (ed.). Michael Faraday's Mental Exercises: An Artisan Essay Circle in Regency London. Liverpool: Liverpool University Press.
- Course of six lectures on the various forces of matter, and their relations to each other London; Glasgow: R. Griffin, 1860.
- The Liquefaction of Gases, Edinburgh: W.F. Clay, 1896.
- The letters of Faraday and Schoenbein 1836–1862. With notes, comments and references to contemporary letters London: Williams & Norgate 1899. (Digital edition by the University and State Library Düsseldorf)

== See also ==
- Faraday (unit) – Physical constant: Electric charge of one mole of electrons
- Forensic engineering – Investigation of failures associated with legal intervention
- Nikola Tesla – Serbian-American engineer and inventor (1856–1943)
- Timeline of hydrogen technologies
- Timeline of low-temperature technology
- Zeeman effect – Spectral line splitting in magnetic field

== Sources ==
- Cantor, Geoffrey (1991). Michael Faraday, Sandemanian and Scientist. Macmillan. ISBN 978-0-333-58802-4.
- Hamilton, James (2004). A Life of Discovery: Michael Faraday, Giant of the Scientific Revolution. New York: Random House. ISBN 978-1-4000-6016-0.
- Thomas, J.M. (1991). Michael Faraday and The Royal Institution: The Genius of Man and Place (PBK). CRC Press. ISBN 978-0-7503-0145-9.
- Thompson, Silvanus (1901). Michael Faraday, His Life and Work. London: Cassell and Company. ISBN 978-1-4179-7036-0.
