= Severn and King Trial =

1820 British insurance trial

The Severn and King Trial or Severn, King and Co. v. the Imperial Insurance Company took place in 1820 and involved sugar refiners Severn, King and Company, who sued their insurers to make them pay for losses caused by a fire. There were actually three related trials brought by Severn and King and a fourth suit settled out of court but the first trial was the better known.

The trials set precedents for the use of expert witnesses, highlighted the difference between scientific proof and legal proof and had significant implications for the professional status of scientists, particularly chemists.

== 1819 fire ==
Severn, King and Company were one of the largest sugar refining establishments in London. They had completed building of new premises in Whitechapel in May 1818. At 3.45 in the morning of 10 November 1819 a fire began and quickly destroyed the premises.

At Severn and King, work usually began at 3.30am and continued until 8pm. Sugar refining at the time took weeks and involved mixing unrefined sugar with cows' blood, heating it to high temperatures, skimming off impurities and then evaporating the solution to get a syrup. The Severn and King refinery used a method of circulating hot oil through a coil to heat the sugar in the clarifying pans.

Severn and King had insurance policies to cover their buildings and contents. Sugar refining industries often had fires so the rates reflected risk and they paid 14 shillings per centum, which was significantly higher than the 2 shillings rate for businesses using flammable materials.

=== Rumoured causes ===
A 10-horsepower steam engine was investigated as the cause but was found to be intact after the fire.

There were also concerns about a Luddite conspiracy because a local worker was reported to have loudly announced that he was glad of the fire destroying a business that had demolished homes to build their premises. The threat of such a deliberate act was in the public mind, as the trial of Cato Street Conspiracist Arthur Thistlewood was being prepared as the Severn and King trial was heard. This was ruled out as a cause after witnesses were interviewed.

Some chemists speculated that a whale oil byproduct (later discovered to be pyridine) had caused the fire, and this potential cause was the main point of focus of the trial.

== Trials ==
=== First trial ===
The first Severn and King insurance trial was brought to the Court of Common Pleas in April 1820 by Severn and King, who sued the Imperial Insurance Company to recover losses from the fire. It was also known as Severn and King vs. Olive and others. The case was heard in Guildhall by Chief Justice Sir Robert Dallas and a special jury. Journalists and the public were interested in the case because of the mystery over how the fire had begun and how it had spread so rapidly. The case also threatened implications for how fire insurance was regulated.

James Stephen, Solicitor General Sergeant John Singleton Copley and King's Sergeant John Lens spoke for the plaintiffs, Severn and King. James Scarlett and Sergeant Robert Henry Blosset spoke for the insurance company defendants.

The insurers tried to argue that they had not been told about the circulating oil process by the refiners. Both sides called chemists and chemical manufacturers as expert witnesses to show that the oil was or was not to blame for the fire, and therefore whether it mattered or not if the insurance company had been made aware of the change in equipment. Notable witnesses for the Severn and King included Anthony Robinson, Samuel Parkes, William Thomas Brande, Friedrich Accum, William Allen, Charles Sylvester, John Thomas Cooper, Bryan Donkin, and James De Ville. They argued that the oil coil process was not only safe but safer than older methods.

Witnesses for the defence included Alexander Garden, Michael Faraday, Richard Phillips, John Bostock, John George Children, John Martineau, and Arthur Aikin. They argued that repeated experiments had shown that heating and cooling whale oil led to dangerously flammable by-products. However, these experimentalists could not explain all of what they were seeing in their experiments, which showed different extents and paths of reaction. They struggled to convince the court that the conditions they were using in experiments were the same as those in the factory.

The field of chemistry had changed significantly in a short time and this meant that the courtroom saw arguments that usually took place at organisations like the Royal Institution or in academic journals. Justice Dallas said that although evidence had come from "as intelligent men in chymical and scientific pursuits as were to be found ... they had, nevertheless, left the Court in a state of utter uncertainty". He described the trial as "humiliation of science" because of the contradictory results of the experiments.

On 13 April the jury found for Severn and King after a short deliberation of less than an hour. The audience in the court cheered when the verdict was given.

=== Later trials ===
The defence sought a new trial on the ground that the jury's verdict went against the weight of the expert evidence.

A second trail, with Severn and King v. the Phoenix Insurance Company, took place in December 1820. It was also known as Severn, King and Co. v. Slade and others. Some of the expert witnesses returned for this trial, and new additions included Thomas Thomson, Dr John Davy, John Dalton, John Ayrton Paris, and John Pearson.

Witnesses for Severn and King conducted experiments to show that over a long period, the whale oil equipment used at the refinery was safe. Parkes especially impressed Justice Dallas with an experiment involving locked rooms, and demonstrated his confidence by putting a burning paper into the oil reservoir, which was extinguished rather than causing a huge fire. For the defence, Faraday and Bostock spoke of new experiments, using equipment again unlike that of the factory, but argued that their experiments were more relevant because they involved heating and cooling, which must happen in the factory, rather than a steady high temperature.

Justice Dallas this time said that "medical men, chymical men, eminent men in every department of science" had shown the jury "the same experiments producing opposite results". He said that in "science in its present state... all that belonged to the theory was doubtful, and all that rested on experiment was new."

After two hours of deliberation, the jury again favoured Severn and King.

A third trial against the Globe Insurance Company took place in March 1821.

A fourth suit against Imperial Insurance was settled out of court after the plaintiffs, Severn and King, won the other three trials. Severn and King recovered the full £70,000 (equivalent to £5,849,387 today) of insured loss.

== Impact ==
The trial had significant consequences for the professionalisation of scientists. The scientists involved in the case sought payment for their expertise. Under the law, "professional status" was required for a witness to be paid for the loss of their time in a bill of costs sent to the losing side. There were few precedents for the use of scientists as expert witnesses at the time. On 12 November 1821, Justice Dallas ruled that scientists were not professionals with university training in agreed fields of knowledge, but "persons of skill" more like mechanics, and could not be paid for their time or experiments. The Times reporter also considered the scientific evidence to be irrelevant.

June Z Fullmer argued that a flourishing of oil-derived substance research after the trial was linked with the experiments that the expert witnesses had conducted, and that naphthalene and benzene were likely created and collected during the trials without being identified.

After the trials, refineries stopped using heated whale oil and moved to a method using vacuum pans.
