= Faraday's ice pail experiment =

Electrostatics experiment

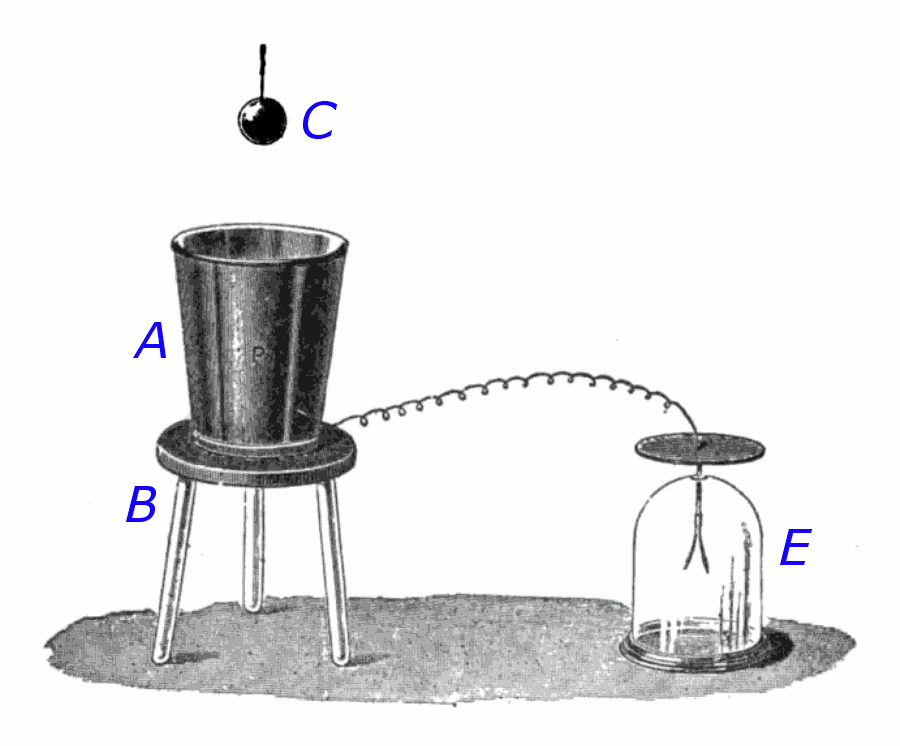
Apparatus Faraday used in the experiment: a metal pail (A) is supported on a wooden stool (B) to insulate it from the ground. A metal ball (C) charged with static electricity can be lowered into the pail on a nonconducting silk thread. A gold-leaf electroscope (E), a sensitive detector of electric charge, is attached by a wire to the outside of the pail. When the charged ball is lowered into the pail without touching it, the electroscope registers a charge, indicating that the ball induces charge in the metal container by electrostatic induction. An opposite charge is induced on the inside surface of the pail.

Faraday's ice pail experiment is a simple electrostatics experiment performed in 1843 by British scientist Michael Faraday that demonstrates the effect of electrostatic induction on a conducting container. For a container, Faraday used a metal pail that had originally been made to hold ice, which gave the experiment its name. The experiment shows that an electric charge enclosed inside a conducting shell induces an equal charge on the shell, and that in an electrically conducting body, the charge resides entirely on the surface. It also demonstrates the principles behind electromagnetic shielding such as employed in the Faraday cage. The ice pail experiment was the first precise quantitative experiment on electrostatic charge. It is still used today in lecture demonstrations and physics laboratory courses to teach the principles of electrostatics.

== Description of experiment ==
Faraday's description of the experiment, from a letter he wrote on February 4, 1843, to Richard Phillips, the editor of Philosophical Journal, and published in the March 1844 issue:

"Let A in the diagram represent an insulated pewter ice-pail...connected by a wire to a delicate gold-leaf electrometer E, and let C be a round brass ball insulated by a dry thread of white silk, three or four feet in length, so as to remove the influence of the hand holding it from the ice-pail below. Let A be perfectly discharged, and then let C be charged at a distance by a [electrostatic] machine or Leyden jar, and introduced into A.. If C be positive, E will also diverge positively; if C be taken away, E will collapse perfectly... As C enters the vessel A the divergence of E will increase until C is ... below the edge of the vessel, and will remain quite steady and unchanged for any greater depression. This shows that at that distance the inductive action of C is entirely exerted upon the interior of A, ... If C is made to touch the bottom of A, all of its charge is communicated to A, ... and C, upon being withdrawn, ... is found to be perfectly discharged."

Below is a detailed modern description of the experimental procedure:

1. The experiment uses a conductive metal container A open at the top, insulated from the ground. Faraday employed a 7 in. diameter by 10.5 in. tall pewter pail on a wooden stool,(B) but modern demonstrations often use a hollow metal sphere with a hole in the top, or a cylinder of metal screen, mounted on an insulating stand. Its outside surface is connected by a wire to a sensitive electric charge detector. Faraday used a gold-leaf electroscope, but modern demonstrations often use a modern electrometer because it is far more sensitive than an electroscope, can distinguish between positive and negative charge, and gives a quantitative readout. The container is discharged by connecting it briefly to a large conducting object, called a ground (earth); this can be done by touching it with a finger, using the conductive human body as a ground. Any initial charge drains off into the ground. The charge detector reads zero, indicating that the container has no charge.
2. A metal object C (Faraday used a brass ball suspended by a nonconductive silk thread, but modern experiments often use a small metal ball or disk mounted on an insulating handle) is charged with electricity using an electrostatic machine and lowered into the container A without touching it . As it is lowered the charge detector's reading increases, indicating that the outside of the container is becoming charged. Once the object is well inside the lip of the container the charge detector levels off and registers a constant charge, even if the object is lowered further. The charge on the outside of the container is the same polarity as that on the object. If the charge detector is touched to the inside surface of the container, it is found to be charged with opposite polarity. For example, if the object C has a positive charge, the outside of the container A will be found to have a positive charge, while the inside of the container has a negative charge.
3. If the object C is moved about inside the container without touching the walls, the charge detector's reading will not change, indicating that the charge on the outside of the container is not affected by where the charged object is inside the container.
4. If the charged object C is lifted out of the container again, the charge detector will decrease to zero again. This shows the charges on the container were induced by C, and the container has no net charge. Therefore, the opposite charges induced on the inside and the outside must be equal in size.
5. The charged object C is touched to the inside of the container. The charge detector reading does not change. However, if the object is now withdrawn from the container, the reading stays the same, indicating that the container now has a net charge. If the object is then tested with the charge detector, it is found to be completely uncharged, and the inside of the container is also found to be uncharged. This indicates that all the charge on C has been transferred to the container, and has exactly neutralized the opposite charge on the inside surface of the container, leaving only the charge on the outside. So the charge on the inside of the container was exactly equal to the charge on C.

Kits are available from educational supply firms containing all the apparatus needed for students to perform the experiment.

=== Preventing error due to stray charges ===
Stray static electric charges on the experimenter's body, clothes, or nearby apparatus, as well as AC electric fields from mains-powered equipment, can induce additional charges on parts of the container or charged object C, giving a false reading. The success of the experiment often requires precautions to eliminate these extraneous charges:

- Any charges on the container and nearby conductive objects should be removed before the experiment by grounding (earthing); touching them briefly to some large conducting object called a ground. Any charge on the object will flow into the ground due to its mutual repulsion. This can be accomplished by touching them with a finger, using the conductive human body as a ground. However the experimenter's body itself should be grounded frequently by touching a good metal ground such as a metal workbench, or preferably a water pipe or the grounding wire of the building's mains power wiring. Ideally the experimenter's body should be grounded throughout the experiment. Some demonstration kits include conductive ground sheets which are laid on the workbench under the apparatus, and antistatic wrist straps the experimenter wears during the experiment, which are connected to a good ground.
- The electrometer measures charge with respect to ground, so it requires a connection to ground during use. It has a ground wire, usually colored black, ending in a clip which should be attached to a metal ground during use.
- The experimenter should avoid excessive movement during the experiment. Walking around or waving his/her arms can cause the buildup of static charges on clothing. The experimenter should hold the handle of the charged object C as far from the object and the container as possible when lowering the object into the container.
- In professional student laboratory kits, the container A is often in the form of two concentric cylinders of metal screen, open at the top. A screen acts the same as a solid metal sheet for electrostatic charge, as long as its holes are small. The inner cylinder is the Faraday pail container itself, separated from the outer cylinder with insulating supports. The outer cylindrical metal screen surrounds the inner, and acts as a ground to shield it from stray charges. This design largely eliminates the stray charge problem, as well as allowing the experimenter to see inside the container. The electrometer ground lead is clipped to the outer ground screen, and the experimenter touches this screen while performing any procedure. To ground the inner screen, the experimenter can bridge his finger between the inner and outer screens. When doing this it is important that he lift his finger first from the inner screen, not the outer, to avoid leaving charge on the inner screen.
- Charge can leak off the charged object C and the container along handles and supports due to surface layers of dirt and oil from fingerprints. If this is suspected the equipment should be washed with detergent to remove oils and dried.
- When measuring the charge on the inside or outside surface of the container, the charge detector should not be touched to the surface near the lip of the container. Extra charge concentrates near the edge of the opening due to the geometry of the metal.

== Explanation ==
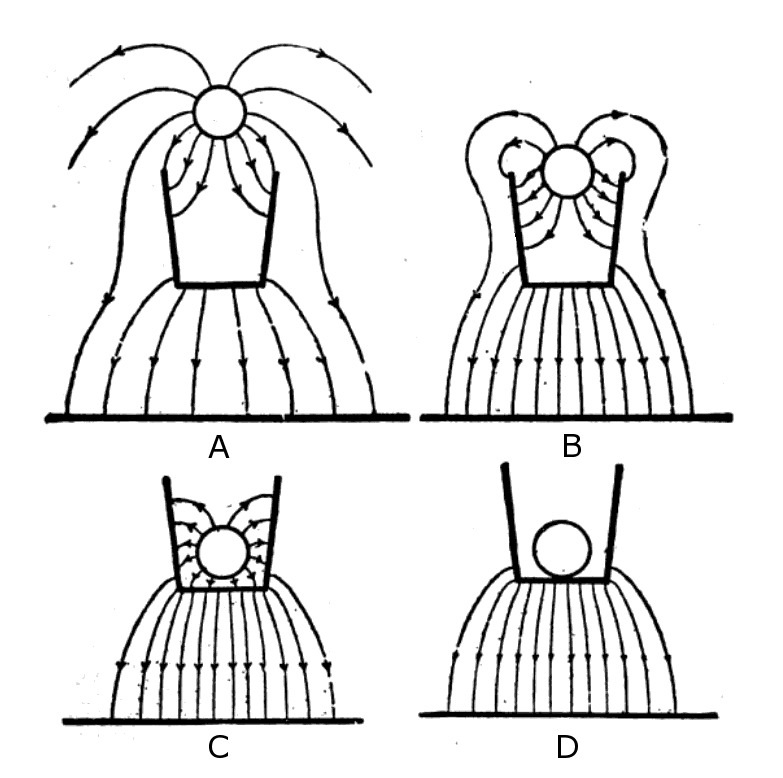
Drawing of the electric field lines as the charged ball is lowered into the container (A,B). When the charge is far enough inside (C), all the electric field lines terminate on the inside of the container, inducing an equal charge there. When the ball is touched to the inside of the container (D), all the charge moves to the pail.

Conductive metal objects contain mobile electric charges (electrons) that can move about freely in the metal. In an uncharged state, each part of the metal contains equal quantities of positive and negative charges, intimately mixed, so no part of it has a net charge. If an external charged object is brought near a piece of metal, the force of the charge causes these internal charges to separate. The charges of opposite polarity to the external charge are attracted to it, and move to the surface of the object facing the charge. The charges of the same polarity are repelled and move to the surface of the metal away from the charge. This is called electrostatic induction. In Procedure 2 above, as the charge C is lowered into the container, the charges in the metal of the container separate. If C has a positive charge, the negative charges in the metal are attracted to it and move to the inner surface of the container, while the positive charges are repelled and move to the outside surface. If C has a negative charge, the charges have opposite polarity. Since the container was originally uncharged, the two regions have equal and opposite charges. The induction process is reversible: in Procedure 4, when C is removed, the attraction of the opposite charges cause them to intermingle again, and the charge on the surfaces reduces to zero.

It is the electrostatic field of the charged object C which causes the mobile charges to move. As the charges in the metal separate, the resulting regions of induced charge on the surfaces of the metal container create their own electrostatic field, which opposes the field from C. The field of the induced charges exactly cancels the field from C throughout the interior of the metal. The electrostatic field inside a piece of metal is always zero. If it was not, the force of the field would cause more motion of charges and more charge separation, until the electric field became zero. Once C is well inside the container, almost all of the electric field lines from C strike the container surface. The result (proved below) is that the total charge induced on the inside of the container is equal to the charge on C.

In Procedure 5, when C is touched to the container's inner wall, all the charge on C flows out and neutralizes the induced charge, leaving both the inner wall and C uncharged. The container is left with the charge on its outside. The net effect is that all the charge that was previously on C is now on the outside of the container.

An important conclusion that can be drawn from this is that the net charge inside a closed conducting container is always zero, even if a charged object is put in. If the charge inside can find a conducting path to the container wall, it will flow to the outside surface of the container due to its mutual repulsion. If it cannot, the interior charge will induce an equal and opposite charge on the inside surface, so the net charge inside is still zero. Any net charge on a conducting object is located on its surface.

=== Proof induced charge is equal to object's charge ===
The gaussian surface S (green)

The result found in Procedure 5, that a charged object enclosed in a metal container induces an equal charge on the container, can be proved using Gauss's law. Assume the container A completely encloses the object C, without an opening (this assumption is explained below), and that C has a charge of Q coulombs. The electric field of the charge C will cause the charges in the volume of the metal to separate, creating regions of induced charge on the inside and outside surfaces of the shell. Now imagine a closed surface S inside the metal of the shell, between the inside and outside surfaces. Since S is in a conducting region (inside the volume of metal) where the electric field is zero, the electric field everywhere on the surface S is zero. Therefore, the total electric flux through the surface S must be zero. Therefore, from Gauss's law the total electric charge inside the surface S must be zero:

$$\iint\limits_S \mathbf{E} \cdot d\mathbf{A} = \frac{1}{\epsilon_0}(Q + Q_{induced})   = 0 \,$$

The only charges inside S are the charge Q on the object C, and the induced charge Q_{induced} on the inside surface of the metal. Since the sum of these two charges is zero, the induced charge on the inside surface of the shell must have an equal but opposite value to the charge on C: Q_{induced} = −Q.

=== Explanation using electric field lines ===
Another way to see that the enclosed charge induces an equal charge in the container is to use the visualization device of electric field lines. Electric field lines terminate on equal charges; that is each line begins on a specific quantity of positive charge, and ends on an equal quantity of negative charge. An additional fact needed is that electric field lines cannot penetrate conductors; if an electric field line penetrated into a volume of metal, the electrons in the metal would flow along the field line, redistributing the charge in the conductor until no electric field was left. Only when the electric field in the conductor is zero can the charges in the conductor be at electrostatic equilibrium.

When the charged object C is enclosed inside the conductive container A, all the field lines extending from the object must terminate on the inside surface of the container; there is nowhere else for them to go. Since each unit of charge on the object originates a field line, which ends on an equal induced charge on the container, the total charge on the object and the induced charge on the container's interior must be equal.

A charged object outside any container also induces an equal charge on its surroundings. The field lines extending from it end on charges induced in the walls or other objects in the room. This illustrates the general principle that for every positive charge, there must be a corresponding negative charge somewhere in the universe.

=== The effect of the hole ===
Strictly speaking, for the induced charge on the container to exactly equal the charge on the object, the metal container must completely enclose the charged object, without a hole. If there is an opening, some of the electric field lines from C will pass through the opening, and therefore will not induce an opposite charge on the container, so the charge on the container's surfaces will be less than the charge on C. But an opening is necessary to get the charged object in and out. In his experiment, Faraday closed the opening by attaching the metal lid of the pail to the thread suspending the ball, so when the ball was lowered to the center of the container the lid covered the opening.

However this is not necessary. The experiment works very well even for containers with large uncovered openings, like Faraday's pail. As long as it is deep enough, and the depth of C inside the container is greater than the diameter of the opening, the induced charge will be very close in value to the charge on C. As the drawing above shows, once the charged object is well inside, most of the electric field lines originating on the charge C end on the container walls, so very few of them pass through the opening to end on negative charges that are not located on the container. John Ambrose Fleming, a prominent early electrical researcher, wrote in 1911:

. . . it is curious to note how large an opening can be made in a vessel which yet remains for all electrical purposes a 'closed conductor'.

But the experiment is often explained, as in the above sections, by assuming the container has no hole.

=== Electrostatic shielding ===
Since there is no electric field in the intervening volume of the metal, the charge distribution on the outside surface of the container and its electric field is completely unaffected by the charges inside the container. If the charged object inside the container is moved about as in Procedure 3, the induced charge distribution on the inside surface will redistribute itself, maintaining the cancellation of the electric fields outside the inner surface. So the charges on the outside surface will be completely unaffected, along with any charges in the outside world. From the outside, the metal container acts exactly like it simply has a surface charge +Q, with no charges inside. Similarly, if an external charge is brought near the container from outside, the induced charge distribution on the outside surface will redistribute to cancel its electric field inside the container. So the charges inside the container will not "feel" any electric field and will not change. In summary, the regions inside and outside of the container are electrically isolated from each other, electric fields from one region cannot penetrate or affect the other. This is the principle of electrostatic shielding used in the Faraday cage.

== Further experiments ==
=== Alternate procedure ===
An alternate way of conducting the experiment: after the charged object C is lowered into the container in Procedure 2, the outside surface of the container is momentarily grounded. The charge on the outside of the container all drains off to ground, and the charge detector declines to zero, leaving the charge on the inside of the container, equal but opposite to that on C. Then the object C is removed from the container. Since C is no longer present to hold the induced charge on the inside surface of the container, it migrates to the outside of the container. so the charge detector registers an equal but opposite charge from its previous reading. This new charge can be proved to be equal and opposite to the charge on C by touching C to the exterior surface of the container. The two charges exactly neutralize each other, so both the exterior of the container and C are found to be uncharged.

=== Noncontact charge measurement ===
Lowering an object into a Faraday container offers a way to measure the charge on it without touching it or disturbing its charge. The charge induced on the outside of the container by charges inside it depends only on the total charge inside. If several charged objects are lowered into the container, the charge on the outside will be equal to their sum.

=== Charge addition ===
If several conducting charged objects are lowered one after the other into the container and touched to the inside, all the charge on each object will be transferred to the outside of the container, regardless of how much charge is already on the container. If two conducting charged objects are simply touched together on their outside surfaces, the charge on both will merely be shared between the two objects.

This is how charge is transferred to the top terminal of a Van de Graaff generator. The terminal is a hollow metal shell and functions as a Faraday pail. Charge is transported inside it on a moving belt, then removed from the belt by a wire attached to the inside of the terminal. Since the inside of the terminal is at a constant potential, the charge from the belt flows to the outside surface, adding to the charge there, regardless of how much charge is already on the terminal.

=== Contact electrification produces equal charges ===
The "charge summing" property of Faraday's pail can be used to prove that contact electrification (triboelectricity), charging objects by rubbing or touching them together, produces equal and opposite charges. A piece of fur and a piece of rubber or plastic are first discharged so they have no charge, then both are lowered together into the container attached to nonconductive handles. The charge detector registers no charge. Then they are rubbed together inside the container. The rubbing will cause the fur to become positively charged and the rubber to become negatively charged due to the triboelectric effect. However, since this is due to a separation of equal charges, the two charges are equal and opposite, so the sum of the charge on both objects is still zero. This is proven by the charge detector, which continues to read zero after the operation. The charges on the individual objects can be demonstrated by removing one at a time from the container. The charge detector will register opposite charges for each remaining object.

=== Multiple concentric containers ===
In his original 1844 paper, Faraday also investigated the effect of using several conducting containers one inside the other. He found that the induction effect works through multiple containers the same way it does through one container. He used four pails, each supported on a nonconductive pad inside the next. If a charge is lowered into the innermost pail, an exactly equal induced charge will appear on the outside of the outer pail. The charge on the outside of each pail induces an equal charge on the next. If one of the pails is grounded, the charge on all the pails outside goes to zero.
