= RFID skimming =

Unlawfully copying payment card information

RFID skimming is a method to unlawfully obtain data from someone's contactless smart card used for payment or identity document using a RFID reading device.

== Techniques ==
Modern payment utilize an RFID chip to transmit card information wirelessly to enable contactless payments, which has become increasingly common. Criminals can take advantage of this technology by using a scanner to wirelessly read a victim's payment card in the same way that a cash register scans it when making a contactless payment.

Most modern mobile telephones running Android OS have a built in NFC reader that can be used to unlawfully scan contactless payment cards. A criminal can hide the scanner e.g. inside a glove or a bag, and then place it close to the victim and wirelessly steal the victim's payment card information.

With the wirelessly obtained payment card information, the criminal can use it to make fraudulent purchases online. This is called card-not-present fraud.

Methods similar to RFID payment card skimming may also be used for copying other RFID-based proximity cards, such as those used for keycard locks. 125 kHz RFID and other systems relying on a unique identifier number (UID) are vulnerable to this.

== Prevalence ==
Prevalence of RFID skimming has been disputed. There are no statistics available regarding RFID skimming, as it is difficult to determine the method of card fraud.

Modern EMV based payment cards feature encryption, making skimming efforts much more difficult.

== RFID skimming compared to other types of skimming ==
In contrast to other types of skimming such as ATM skimming or hacking an online merchant web page, RFID skimming requires little or no technical expertise. In order to execute ATM skimming, the criminal needs to custom build a device, then place that device inside an ATM and later pick up the device after the victims have used it. Hacking online merchant web pages requires substantial computer knowledge.

== Methods for preventing RFID skimming ==
=== Metal foil ===
Shielding is possible by wrapping the payment card in aluminum foil. However aluminium foil tends to wear out quickly. Informal tests found that the shielding effect was not 100% effective, although the foil did very much reduce the maximum range for reading, from about 1.5 feet (50 cm) to 1–2 inches (3–5 cm).

=== Permanent disabling of RFID functionality ===
According to informal reports, RFID functionality can be disabled permanently by cutting internal wires and the use of a microwave oven has also been reported successful. Cutting requires location of the internal wires, followed by cutting, drilling, or heating. Methods that visibly damage the card may lead to it being rejected as a payment method when presented to a retailer in the normal way.

=== RFID-blocking materials ===
There are RFID-blocking wallets, purses, sleeves, and cards. Wallets, purses, and sleeves work by acting as a Faraday cage that creates a screen around contactless cards, which stops electromagnetic fields interacting with the cards.

=== RFID-blocking cards ===
An RFID blocking card is an RFID-blocking device that operates without a battery by receiving the RFID signal from a card reader or skimmer, scrambling the RFID signal making it unreadable by any device. Most RFID wallets try to stop the electromagnetic fields interacting with RFID cards whereas RFID blocking cards intended for 13.56 MHZ credit cards disrupt the communication.
