= List of state roads in Indiana =

State Roads in Indiana
- State Road markers

Highway names
- Interstates: Interstate X (I-X)
- US Highways: U.S. Highway X (US X)
- State: State Road X (SR X)

System links
- Indiana State Highway System; Interstate; US; State; Scenic

State Roads in the U.S. state of Indiana are numbered rationally: in general, odd one-digit and two-digit highways are north–south highways, numbers increasing toward the west; even one-digit and two-digit highways are east–west highways, numbers increasing toward the south, the opposite of the Interstate Highway System. Three-digit highways are related, as a rule, to the single-digit or two-digit parent US or State Road; thus State Road 205 (SR 205) is related to SR 5, and SR 120 is related to U.S. Highway 20 (US 20).

Exceptions to this system are SR 37, SR 47, SR 56, SR 57, SR 62, and SR 67, diagonal routes, the defunct SR 100 beltline around Indianapolis, SR 135 (which acts like a two-digit state highway), and both SR 149 and SR 249 (which are arterials between SR 49 and SR 51). Another exception to the system was SR 265; this highway was an eighteen-mile-long (29 km) extension that existed between Interstate 265 (I-265) and I-65 and is over 100 miles (160 km) east of either SR 65 or SR 165, both located in Southwestern Indiana near Evansville. With the completion of the Lewis and Clark Bridge Indiana 265 now exists as a part of Interstate 265.

The numbers of several important U.S. Highways that travel through Indiana are not used as State Road numbers: these include 6, 12, 20, 24, 27, 30, 31, 33, 35, 36, 40, 41, 50, and 52. US 40, in fact, roughly corresponds in location to where "SR 40" would be; SR 38 is north of it and SR 42 is south of it. US 6 is located similarly, and, in fact, follows the general course of former SR 6.

== Mainline highways ==
Number	Length (mi)	Length (km)	Southern or western terminus	Northern or eastern terminus	Formed	Removed	Notes
SR 1	138.185	222.387	I-275/US 50 near Lawrenceburg	I-469/US 33 near Fort Wayne	—	—	Southern segment
SR 1	41.395	66.619	I-69 in Fort Wayne	US 20 near Angola	1930	current	Northern segment
SR 2	81.023	130.394	IL 17 near Lowell	US 20/US 31 near South Bend	—	—	
SR 3	180.352	290.248	SR 62 in Charlestown	US 224 in Markle	—	—	Southern segment
SR 3	44.796	72.092	I-69/US 24/US 27/US 30 in Fort Wayne	SR 120 near Brighton	1930	current	Northern segment
SR 4	26.5	42.6	SR 2 in La Porte	US 31 near Lakeville	1935	current	Western segment
SR 4	5.310	8.546	Lincoln Avenue in Goshen	SR 13 near Goshen	1932	current	Central segment
SR 4	5.935	9.551	SR 327 in Helmer	I-69 in Ashley	1950	current	Eastern segment
SR 5	96.194	154.809	SR 22 in Upland	SR 120 near Shipshewana	1931	current	
SR 6	—	—	Illinois state line in Munster	OH 2 east of Butler	1926	1932	Replaced by US 6
SR 7	36.594	58.892	SR 56 in Madison	SR 46 in Columbus	—	—	
SR 8	42.845	68.952	US 231/SR 2 in Hebron	SR 17 near Plymouth	1932	current	Western segment
SR 8	—	—	SR 13 south of Lake Wawasee	US 33 near Kimmell	1951	1971	Central segment
SR 8	34.631	55.733	SR 9 in Albion	OH 18 near Hicksville, Ohio	1932	current	Eastern segment
SR 9	189.586	305.109	SR 46 near Columbus	M-66 near Sturgis, Michigan	—	—	
SR 10	85.191	137.102	IL 14 near Lake Village	SR 19 near Etna Green	—	—	
SR 11	29.820	47.991	SR 135 near Mauckport	SR 62 near Lanesville	—	—	Southern segment
SR 11	26.184	42.139	SR 250 in Dudleytown	SR 46 near Columbus	—	—	Northern segment
SR 13	138.632	223.107	US 36 in Fortville	US 131 near Middlebury	1931	current	
SR 14	122.976	197.911	US 41 in Enos	I-69/US 24/US 33 in Fort Wayne	—	—	
SR 15	94.835	152.622	US 35/SR 22 at Jonesboro	M-103 near Bristol	—	—	
SR 16	105.171	169.256	US 41 in Ade	SR 5 in Huntington	—	—	
SR 17	50.705	81.602	SR 25 in Logansport	US 30 in Plymouth	1932	current	
SR 18	141.13	227.13	Illinois state line near Fowler	US 27/SR 67 in Bryant	—	—	
SR 19	143.00	230.14	SR 32/SR 38 in Noblesville	Michigan state line near Simonton Lake	—	—	
SR 21	—	—	OH 177 near Boston	US 24 in Peru	1926	1979	Largely replaced by US 35 and SR 19
SR 22	11.496	18.501	SR 29 in Burlington	Sycamore Street in Kokomo	—	—	Western segment
SR 22	33.493	53.902	US 31/US 35 in Kokomo	SR 26 in Upland	—	—	Eastern segment
SR 23	50.871	81.869	SR 10 near Bass Lake	M-62 in Granger	—	—	
SR 25	30.871	49.682	SR 32 near Waynetown	US 52/US 231 in West Lafayette	—	—	Southern segment
SR 25	86.359	138.981	Schuyler Avenue near Lafayette	SR 15 in Warsaw	—	—	Northern segment
SR 26	29.857	48.050	IL 9/SR 352 near Ambia	US 52/US 231 near West Lafayette	—	—	Western segment
SR 26	120.243	193.512	I-65 in Lafayette	OH 119 near Portland	—	—	Eastern segment
SR 28	152.824	245.946	IL 119 near West Lebanon	OH 571 in Union City	—	—	
SR 29	31.165	50.155	US 421/SR 28 in Boyleston	US 35 in Logansport	—	—	
SR 32	156.814	252.368	Illinois state line near Perrysville	OH 47 in Union City	—	—	
SR 33	—	—	SR 135 in Mauckport	SR 60 in Bennettsville	—	1937	Renumbered to SR 11 because of US 33
SR 34	—	—	IL 10 near Covington	US 52 in Indianapolis	1926	1950	Replaced by US 136
SR 35	—	—	Mauckport	US 31 in Indianapolis	1926	1934	Renumbered to SR 135 because of US 35
SR 37	96	154	SR 66 in Tell City	I-69 near Bloomington	—	—	Southern segment
SR 37	46.6	75.0	I-69 in Fishers	SR 9 in Marion	—	—	Central segment
SR 37	14.4	23.2	I-469/US 24/US 30 in Fort Wayne	OH 2 near Harlan	—	—	Northern segment
SR 38	121.071	194.845	US 52/SR 25 in Lafayette	US 35 in Richmond	—	—	
SR 39	14.91	24.00	SR 56 near Scottsburg	SR 250 near Brownstown	1936	current	Southern Segment
SR 39	179.7	289.2	SR 37 in Martinsville	M-239 near New Buffalo, Michigan	—	—	Northern Segment
SR 42	62.705	100.914	SR 46 in Terre Haute	SR 67/SR 144 in Mooresville	1932	current	
SR 43	23.374	37.617	SR 54 near Cincinnati	SR 46 near Spencer	—	—	Southern segment
SR 43	17.426	28.044	I-65 near Battle Ground	US 24/US 421 in Reynolds	—	—	Northern segment
SR 44	18.588	29.914	I-69 in Martinsville	SR 144 in Franklin	—	—	Western segment
SR 44	67.610	108.808	I-65 in Franklin	OH 725 near Liberty	—	—	Eastern segment
SR 45	55.65	89.56	US 231 in Scotland	SR 135 in Beanblossom	—	—	
SR 46	156.72	252.22	I-70 in Terre Haute	US 52 near West Harrison	—	—	
SR 47	64.22	103.35	US 41 near Turkey Run State Park	SR 38 in Sheridan	—	—	
SR 48	29.963	48.221	SR 63 in Fairbanks	US 231/SR 67/SR 157 in Worthington	1932	current	Western segment
SR 48	5.991	9.642	SR 43 in Whitehall	SR 37/SR 45 in Bloomington	—	—	Central segment
SR 48	26.472	42.603	SR 229 in Napoleon	US 50 in Lawrenceburg	—	—	Eastern segment
SR 49	44.385	71.431	SR 14 in Wheatfield	Indiana Dunes State Park in Porter	—	—	
SR 51	9.557	15.381	US 30 east of Merrillville	US 20 in Lake Station	—	—	
SR 53	14.019	22.561	US 231 in Crown Point	US 12/US 20 in Gary	—	—	
SR 54	55.17	88.79	US 41 in Sullivan	SR 37 near Oolitic	—	—	
SR 55	109.41	176.08	SR 25 in Wingate	US 6 Business in Gary	—	—	
SR 56	193.43	311.30	US 41 in Hazleton	US 50/SR 350 in Aurora	—	—	
SR 57	83.19	133.88	US 41 in Evansville	US 231 in Worthington	—	—	
SR 58	—	—	SR 56 in Vevay	SR 56 near Rising Sun	1926	1930	Renumbered SR 156
SR 58	122.07	196.45	SR 63 in Merom	I-65 near Columbus	—	—	
SR 59	79.53	127.99	SR 58 in Sandborn	SR 47 in Waveland	—	—	
SR 60	62.21	100.12	US 50 near Huron	US 31 near Sellersburg	1930	current	
SR 61	65.182	104.900	SR 66 near Newburgh	Wabash Avenue in Vincennes	—	—	
SR 62	227.19	365.63	IL 141 near Mount Vernon	SR 262 in Dillsboro	—	—	
SR 63	16.318	26.261	SR 58 in Merom	SR 246 in Prairie Creek	—	—	Southern segment
SR 63	63.237	101.770	US 41 in Terre Haute	US 41 near Carbondale	—	—	Northern segment
SR 64	107.49	172.99	IL 15 in East Mount Carmel	I-64/SR 62 near Edwardsville	—	—	
SR 65	47.74	76.83	SR 66 near Evansville	SR 56 west of Petersburg	—	—	
SR 66	150.862	242.789	SR 69 near New Harmony	US 150 near Hardinsburg	—	—	
SR 67	199.24	320.65	US 41/US 150 near Vincennes	OH 29 near Trinity	—	—	
SR 68	52.927	85.178	SR 69 in New Harmony	US 231 in Dale	1931	current	
SR 69	35.604	57.299	Hovey Lake Fish and Wildlife Area	I-64 in Griffin	1932	current	
SR 70	9.116	14.671	US 231 near Chrisney	SR 66 near Troy	1932	current	Western segment
SR 70	6.155	9.906	SR 37 in Gatchel	SR 66 in Derby	1953	current	Eastern segment
SR 71	19.933	32.079	SR 163 in Blanford	SR 63 near Newport	1932	current	Southern segment
SR 71	17.551	28.246	SR 352 near Ambia	US 24/US 52 near Kentland	1951	current	Northern segment
SR 73	—	—	Joliet Street near Schererville	Ridge Road in Griffith	—	1969	
SR 75	36.896	59.378	US 40 near Stilesville	SR 47 in Thorntown	1934	current	Southern segment
SR 75	22.667	36.479	US 421/SR 38/SR 39 near Frankfort	SR 218 in Camden	—	—	Northern segment
SR 75	—	—	KY 2262 near Owensboro, Kentucky	SR 66 near Rockport	1940	1981	Bridge segment
SR 79	—	—	US 31 south of Edinburgh	US 31 west of Edinburgh	—	1960	
SR 100	—	—	I-465 in Indianapolis	I-65/US 52/SR 334 near Zionsville	1949	1999	
SR 101	0.560	0.901	KY 1039 near Florence	SR 156 near Florence	—	—	Southern segment
SR 101	17.477	28.127	US 50 near Milan	I-74 near Sunman	—	—	South central segment
SR 101	16.271	26.186	US 52/SR 1 in Brookville	US 27/SR 44 in Liberty	—	—	North central segment
SR 101	44.983	72.393	SR 124 near Pleasant Mills	SR 1/SR 8 near Newville	1934	current	Northern segment
SR 102	—	—	SR 9 north of Columbia City	US 33 near Merriam	1932	1971	
SR 103	14.089	22.674	US 40 in Lewisville	US 36 near Mount Summit	1929	current	
SR 104	9.519	15.319	SR 4 near La Porte	US 6 in Walkerton	—	—	
SR 105	31.934	51.393	SR 9 east of La Fontaine	SR 5 in South Whitley	1932	current	
SR 106	4.305	6.928	US 6 west of Bremen	US 6 east of Bremen	1985	current	
SR 107	14.09	22.68	SR 56/SR 62 near Madison	US 421/SR 62 in Madison	1932	1976	Replaced by SR 62
SR 108	—	—	US 41 in Cedar Lake	US 152 in Crown Point	1935	1937	
SR 109	20.129	32.394	US 40 in Knightstown	I-69/SR 9/SR 67 in Anderson	1940	current	Southern segment
SR 109	11.640	18.733	US 30 in Columbia City	US 33 near Wolf Lake	1934	current	Northern segment
SR 110	2.485	3.999	SR 10 near DeMotte	US 231 near DeMotte	—	—	Western segment
SR 110	16.395	26.385	SR 17 south of Culver	SR 25 near Talma	—	—	Eastern segment
SR 111	25.1	40.4	Dead end at the Ohio River in New Boston	I-64 in New Albany	1938	current	
SR 112	—	—	SR 19 in Elkhart	SR 19 in Elkhart	1937	1998	Replaced by SR 19
SR 113	—	—	SR 114 in North Manchester	SR 5 north of Huntington	1932	1973	
SR 114	28.708	46.201	US 41 near Morocco	US 421 north of Monon	1932	current	Western segment
SR 114	5.832	9.386	SR 17 near Grass Creek	SR 25 in Fulton	—	—	Central segment
SR 114	36.246	58.332	SR 14 in Akron	US 24 near Fort Wayne	1931	current	Eastern segment
SR 115	3.375	5.432	US 24 near Wabash	SR 15 near Wabash	—	—	
SR 116	31.703	51.021	US 224 in Markle	US 27 in Geneva	—	—	
SR 117	4.434	7.136	SR 110 southeast of Culver	SR 10 east of Culver	—	—	
SR 118	—	—	SR 3/SR 5 southeast of Warren	OH 707 east of Berne	1932	1964	Replaced by SR 218
SR 119	13.674	22.006	SR 16/SR 39 in Buffalo	US 35 in Winamac	1933	current	Southern segment
SR 119	10.274	16.534	SR 19 near Wakarusa	SR 15 in Goshen	1932	current	Northern segment
SR 120	60.093	96.710	Middleton Run Road in Elkhart	Michigan state line east of Fremont	1937	current	
SR 121	15.296	24.617	US 52 west of Metamora	SR 44 in Connersville	1932	current	Southern segment
SR 121	4.207	6.771	US 27/SR 227 in Richmond	OH 121 near New Paris, Ohio	—	—	Northern segment
SR 122	—	—	US 27 in Boston	OH 122 east of Boston	1929	1981	
SR 123	—	—	SR 23 southwest of South Bend	US 20 west of South Bend	1935	1980	
SR 124	69.630	112.059	SR 19 in Peru	OH 81 near Willshire, Ohio	1932	current	
SR 126	1.09	1.75	SR 526 in West Lafayette	US 231 in West Lafayette	1957	2013	
SR 127	6.937	11.164	US 20 in Angola	I-69/I-80/I-90/SR 120 west of Fremont	1934	current	
SR 128	10.865	17.486	SR 13 south of Elwood	SR 9 south of Alexandria	—	—	
SR 129	48.008	77.261	SR 56 near Vevay	SR 46 near Batesville	1932	current	
SR 130	7.872	12.669	US 6/US 6 Business/SR 51 in Hobart	SR 149 near Valparaiso	—	—	
SR 131	—	—	US 31 in Clarksville	SR 62 in Clarksville	1953	2002	
SR 132	—	—	SR 13 near Lapel	SR 38 in Pendleton	1932	1975	
SR 133	—	—	New Boston	SR 33/SR 62 near New Albany	1935	1937	Replaced by SR 111
SR 134	0.379	0.610	Indiana Women's Prison in Indianapolis	US 136 in Indianapolis	—	—	Girls School Road
SR 135	138.55	222.97	KY 79 in Mauckport	US 31 in Indianapolis	1935	current	
SR 136	—	—	US 41 near Bloomingdale	SR 39 near Danville	1932	1950	Renumbered to SR 236 because of US 136
SR 140	2.244	3.611	Indiana Soldiers and Sailors Children's Home	US 40 in Knightstown	1932	current	
SR 141	—	—	US 41 in Carbondale	US 41 near Boswell	1984	1988	Southern segment
SR 141	—	—	US 30 in Dyer	US 6/US 41 near Munster	—	—	Northern segment
SR 141	17	27	Waterworks road south of Evansville, IN	Interstate 64	2031	current	Future route once I-69 Ohio River Crossing is complete.
SR 142	10.187	16.394	SR 42 in Eminence	SR 39 west of Centerton	1934	current	
SR 143	1.507	2.425	Jasper-Pulaski Fish and Wildlife Area	US 421 south of San Pierre	—	—	
SR 144	7.155	11.515	SR 42/SR 67 in Mooresville	I-69 near Waverly	1935	current	Western segment
SR 144	4.808	7.738	SR 135 in Bargersville	SR 44 in Franklin	1932	current	Eastern segment
SR 145	45.458	73.158	SR 37 near Tell City	SR 56 in French Lick	1931	current	
SR 146	—	—	McCormick's Creek State Park	SR 46 near McCormick's Creek State Park	1932	1933	
SR 146	—	—	SR 46 near Bloomington	SR 45/SR 46 near Bloomington	1961	1966	
SR 148	5.114	8.230	SR 48 west of Lawrenceburg	US 50 in Aurora	1932	current	
SR 149	8.698	13.998	SR 130 near Valparaiso	US 12 in Burns Harbor	—	—	
SR 152	2.487	4.002	I-80/I-94/US 6/US 41 in Hammond	US 20 in Hammond	—	—	Indianapolis Boulevard
SR 154	13.181	21.213	Illinois state line near Hutsonville, Illinois	US 41/US 150 in Sullivan	—	—	
SR 156	27.233	43.827	SR 56 in Vevay	SR 56 near Rising Sun	—	—	
SR 157	26.838	43.192	US 231/SR 54 in Bloomfield	SR 59/SR 246 in Clay City	—	—	
SR 158	10.169	16.365	Crane Naval Surface Warfare Center	SR 450 in Bedford	1932	current	
SR 159	6.084	9.791	SR 67 in Bicknell	SR 58 in Freelandville	—	—	Southern segment
SR 159	8.103	13.041	CR 425 S & CR 900 E/CR 1600 W near Greene-Sullivan State Forest	SR 54 in Dugger	—	—	Central segment
SR 159	18.473	29.729	SR 48 near Coalmont	SR 46 in Riley	—	—	Northern segment
SR 160	18.735	30.151	SR 60 in Salem	US 31 in Henryville	—	—	
SR 161	49.691	79.970	KY 2262 near Owensboro, Kentucky	SR 64 near Huntingburg	1931	current	Owensboro Bridge
SR 162	27.861	44.838	SR 62 in Gentryville	US 231 in Jasper	—	—	
SR 163	8.886	14.301	Illinois state line near Blanford	US 41 in Clinton	1931	current	
SR 164	19.096	30.732	US 231 in Jasper	SR 145 near Patoka Lake	1931	current	
SR 165	17.172	27.636	SR 66 in Wadesville	SR 65 in Owensville	—	—	
SR 166	6.360	10.235	Ohio River in Tobinsport	SR 66 east of Cannelton	—	—	
SR 167	10.371	16.691	SR 67 in Albany	SR 26 near Trenton	1931	current	
SR 168	17.179	27.647	SR 65 in Owensville	SR 57 in Mackey	—	—	
SR 200	1.23	1.98	SR 9/SR 67 in Pendleton	OH 200 at Indiana–Ohio state line	1931	1932	Became part of US 36
SR 201	1.237	1.991	Ouabache State Park	SR 124 near Bluffton	—	—	
SR 202	—	—	US 231 in Crown Point	SR 53 in Crown Point	1926	1975	
SR 203	13.526	21.768	SR 362 near Nabb	SR 256 east of Austin	—	—	
SR 205	32.143	51.729	SR 5 near South Whitley	SR 327 near Garrett	1935	current	
SR 209	—	—	US 40 east of Greenfield	SR 234 north of Willow Branch	1940	1972	
SR 210	—	—	US 35/SR 10 northwest of Bass Lake	SR 10 northeast of Bass Lake	—	1966	
SR 211	2.031	3.269	SR 11 near Elizabeth	SR 111 east of Elizabeth	—	—	
SR 212	3.223	5.187	US 20 in Michigan City	US 12 in Michiana Shores	1930	current	
SR 213	24.968	40.182	SR 37 near Noblesville	US 35/SR 22 in Greentown	—	—	
SR 216	—	—	SR 316 near Bluffton	SR 301 near Vera Cruz	—	1975	
SR 218	41.382	66.598	Old SR 25 in Delphi	SR 19 in Santa Fe	—	—	Western segment
SR 218	49.887	80.285	SR 15 in La Fontaine	OH 707 east of Berne	1932	current	Eastern segment
SR 219	—	—	US 33 in Osceola	US 20 in Osceola	1935	1999	
SR 220	—	—	US 20 northeast of Rolling Prairie	M-40 northeast of New Carlisle	1935	1938	
SR 220	—	—	US 20 west of Rolling Prairie	US 20 east of Rolling Prairie	1945	1952	
SR 221	—	—	SR 21 in Matthews	SR 9/SR 37 near Huntington	1932	1976	
SR 223	—	—	SR 23 south of Crumstown	SR 123 in South Bend	1935	1971	
SR 225	3.968	6.386	Old SR 25 near Lafayette	SR 43 near Battle Ground	—	—	
SR 227	37.400	60.189	OH 177 south of Boston	SR 32 in Union City	1931	current	
SR 229	24.808	39.925	US 421 in Napoleon	US 52 near Metamora	1931	current	
SR 230	—	—	US 24 in New Haven	OH 113 in Edgerton	1932	1940	Replaced by SR 14
SR 230	—	—	SR 324 in Fort Wayne	US 24/US 30/SR 14 near New Haven	—	1956	
SR 231	—	—	SR 62 near Clarksville	US 31E in Clarksville	1931	1952	Renumbered to SR 131 because of US 231
SR 232	1.994	3.209	SR 9/SR 32 in Anderson	Mounds State Park	—	—	
SR 234	53.504	86.106	Illinois state line near Cayuga	US 136/SR 75 in Jamestown	1931	current	Western segment
SR 234	—	—	US 31 in Carmel	SR 37 near Fishers	1931	1980	Central segment
SR 234	26.345	42.398	US 36/SR 67 in McCordsville	SR 38 near Cadiz	1932	current	Eastern segment
SR 235	7.518	12.099	SR 135 east of Medora	US 50 north of Medora	—	—	
SR 236	40.662	65.439	US 41 near Bloomingdale	SR 39 in Danville	—	—	Western segment
SR 236	6.117	9.844	SR 9 in Anderson	Middletown	—	—	Eastern segment
SR 237	5.370	8.642	KY 69 in Cannelton	SR 37 near Tell City	—	—	Southern segment
SR 237	9.946	16.007	SR 62/SR 66 in Sulphur	SR 37/SR 64 in English	—	—	Northern segment
SR 238	—	—	SR 37 in Noblesville	SR 13 in Fortville	1979	2011	
SR 240	10.172	16.370	US 231 in Greencastle	SR 75 near Stilesville	—	—	
SR 241	18.495	29.765	US 41 in Decker	US 50/US 150 in Wheatland	—	—	
SR 243	9.443	15.197	SR 42 near Cagles Mill Lake	US 40 in Putnamville	—	—	
SR 244	22.294	35.879	Michigan Road near Shelbyville	US 52 in Andersonville	1932	current	
SR 245	13.577	21.850	SR 70 west of Troy	SR 62 near Dale	1932	current	
SR 246	37.876	60.956	SR 63 in Prairie Creek	SR 46 in Vandalia	1932	current	
SR 249	2.443	3.932	US 20 in Portage	US 12 near Burns Harbor	—	—	
SR 250	33.433	53.805	US 50 in Brownstown	SR 7 in Middlefork	—	—	Western segment
SR 250	35.132	56.539	US 421 in Belleview	SR 156 in Patriot	—	—	Eastern segment
SR 252	36.637	58.962	SR 37 near Martinsville	CR 250 West Flat Rock	—	—	Western segment
SR 252	11.182	17.996	US 52/SR 1 in Brookville	OH 126/SR 129 near Scipio, Ohio	1931	current	
SR 256	26.832	43.182	Old SR 39 west of Austin	SR 56 near Madison	1932	current	
SR 257	31.352	50.456	Broadway Street in Stendal	Old US 50 in Washington	—	—	
SR 258	12.797	20.595	SR 58 near Freetown	SR 11 in Seymour	—	—	
SR 259	—	—	US 41/US 150 near Youngstown	SR 159 near Blackhawk	1935	1937	
SR 261	7.754	12.479	SR 66 near Newburgh	SR 62 near Boonville	1932	current	
SR 262	14.909	23.994	US 50 in Dillsboro	SR 56 in Rising Sun	1932	current	
SR 263	12.913	20.781	SR 63 near Covington	SR 63 north of West Lebanon	—	—	Former route of SR 63
SR 264	4.859	7.820	SR 162 in Ferdinand	Ferdinand State Forest	—	—	
SR 265	4.0	6.4	I-65/SR 62 in Clarksville	Kentucky state line on Lewis and Clark Bridge at Utica	1971	2019	Former temporary designation for I-265 between I-65 and KY 841; redesignated as I-265 in June 2019
SR 266	—	—	US 41/US 641 in Evansville	SR 662 near Newburgh	—	1962	
SR 267	—	—	Old SR 267/CR 700 S in Plainfield	US 40 in Plainfield	1932	2021	Southern segment
SR 267	8.7	14.0	I-74 in Brownsburg	I-65/US 52 near Whitestown	—	—	Northern segment
SR 269	0.890	1.432	Harmonie State Park	SR 69 south of New Harmony	—	—	
SR 301	9.582	15.421	SR 116 at Vera Cruz	US 224 east of Tocsin	—	—	
SR 303	—	—	SR 26 near Hartford City	SR 3 in Zanesville	1935	1976	
SR 311	7.24	11.65	SR 111 in New Albany	US 31 near Sellersburg	1980	2013	Formerly a part of US 31W
SR 312	3.042	4.896	Chicago Avenue & White Oak Avenue at Hammond–East Chicago city line	US 12/SR 912 in East Chicago	—	—	
SR 313	—	—	US 6/SR 13 north of Syracuse	US 33 south of Benton	1939	1970	
SR 316	—	—	SR 316 in Bluffton	SR 301 near Vera Cruz	—	1975	
SR 318	—	—	SR 303 west of Keystone	SR 1 south of Petroleum	—	1972	Replaced by Wells County Road 1000 S
SR 319	—	—	US 20 in Elkhart	SR 15 in Bristol	1936	1940	Replaced by SR 120
SR 324	—	—	US 30/US 33 near Fort Wayne	SR 230 in Fort Wayne	1949	1956	
SR 327	31.768	51.126	SR 205 south of Garrett	Michigan state line north of Orland	1931	current	
SR 329	0.355	0.571	SR 29 south of Logansport	US 24/US 35/SR 25 in Logansport	—	—	
SR 329	—	—	SR 29 south of Logansport	US 24/SR 25 in Logansport	1985	1999	
SR 329	—	—	SR 334 in Zionsville	SR 29 near Zionsville	1935	1937	Replaced by SR 334
SR 330	—	—	US 30 in Schererville	SR 230 near Merrillville	1938	1946	
SR 331	43.278	69.649	SR 25 near Tippecanoe	SR 23 near Granger	1932	current	
SR 332	7.648	12.308	I-69 west of Muncie	Tillotson Avenue in Muncie	1982	current	
SR 334	6.26	10.07	I-65 west of Zionsville	US 421 in Zionsville	1935	2011	
SR 335	4.471	7.195	SR 135 west of Crandall	SR 64 north of Crandall	—	—	Southern segment
SR 335	9.897	15.928	US 150 near Greenville	SR 60 in New Pekin	—	—	Northern segment
SR 337	22.103	35.571	SR 11 south of Dogwood	SR 64 in Depauw	—	—	Southern segment
SR 337	13.442	21.633	SR 56 in Livonia	SR 37 near Orleans	—	—	Northern segment
SR 340	5.506	8.861	US 40 in Cloverland	US 40 in Brazil	—	—	
SR 341	22.744	36.603	SR 234 south of Wallace	SR 28 east of Attica	—	—	
SR 342	0.35	0.56	Terre Haute International Airport	SR 42 east of Terre Haute	—	2014	
SR 343	—	—	SR 243 west of Cloverdale	US 231/SR 43 in Cloverdale	1957	1974	
SR 345	—	—	SR 162 south of Lincoln City	US 231/SR 45/SR 62 south of Dale	1932	1966	
SR 346	—	—	SR 45/SR 46 near Bloomington	SR 146 in Bloomington	1961	1966	
SR 350	23.416	37.684	US 421 in Osgood	US 50/SR 56 in Aurora	1931	current	
SR 352	20.554	33.078	SR 26 south of Ambia	US 52 east of Oxford	1935	current	
SR 356	9.911	15.950	SR 57 in Petersburg	SR 257 near Otwell	—	—	Western segment
SR 356	15.359	24.718	US 31 near Scottsburg	SR 62 near Hanover	1932	current	Eastern segment
SR 357	1.238	1.992	SR 64 in Oakland City	SR 57 in Oakland City	—	—	
SR 358	12.146	19.547	SR 67 near Edwardsport	SR 58 south of Elnora	—	—	
SR 362	7.415	11.933	SR 3 near Nabb	SR 62 north of New Washington	—	—	
SR 364	4.175	6.719	SR 61 south of Winslow	Pike State Forest	—	—	
SR 367	—	—	US 36/SR 67 near Lawrence	US 31/SR 37 in Indianapolis	1937	1960	
SR 403	—	—	US 31 in Sellersburg	SR 3 in Charlestown	1932	2012	
SR 407	—	—	SR 7 in Queensville	SR 3 east of Queensville	1932	1937	
SR 420	—	—	Illinois State Line	Gary	1952	1959	Replaced by I-80
SR 427	15.564	25.048	US 6 in Waterloo	OH 34 east of Hamilton	1932	current	
SR 431	—	—	SR 37 in Indianapolis	US 31 near Carmel	1933	2007	Keystone Parkway
SR 431	—	—	US 31 in Greenwood	US 31 in Indianapolis	1944	1992	Southern segment
SR 434	—	—	US 421 in Augusta	US 31 north of Indiananpolis	—	1962	
SR 435	—	—	US 35 southeast of Logansport	SR 329 in Logansport	1985	1999	
SR 441	2.594	4.175	US 41 south of Vincennes	IL 33 in Vincennes	—	—	Lincoln Memorial Bridge
SR 443	1.38	2.22	SR 43 in West Lafayette	US 52 in West Lafayette	—	2013	
SR 445	2.807	4.517	SR 54 northwest of Cincinnati	I-69 northeast of Cincinnati	1936	current	
SR 446	23.550	37.900	US 50 east of Bedford	SR 46 in Bloomington	—	—	
SR 450	24.956	40.163	US 50 near Shoals	US 50 in Bedford	1932	current	
SR 458	1.138	1.831	SR 158 west of Bedford	Purdue Farm Road west of Oolitic	1951	current	
SR 462	2.946	4.741	O'Bannon Woods State Park	SR 62 near White Cloud	—	—	
SR 469	—	—	I-69 near Fort Wayne	US 30 in New Haven	—	1990	Replaced by I-469
SR 513	0.26	0.42	US 35/SR 22	West of Somerset	1940	1974	
SR 520	0.248	0.399	US 20 in Pines	US 12 in Pines	—	—	
SR 524	3.662	5.893	US 24 near Lagro	Salamonie River State Forest	—	—	
SR 526	1.61	2.59	Purdue University Airport	SR 126 in West Lafayette	—	2013	
SR 527	—	—	OH 54 southeast of Pleasant Mill	US 27 in Decatur	1933	1937	
SR 532	—	—	SR 75 west of Advance	SR 39 south of Lebanon	—	1968	
SR 534	—	—	US 40 in Indiananpolis	SR 421 in Indiananpolis	—	1948	
SR 535	—	—	SR 135 west of Trafalgar	Trafalgar	1942	1945	
SR 545	13.916	22.396	SR 66 in Troy	SR 62 in St. Meinrad	—	—	Southern segment
SR 545	11.059	17.798	SR 164 east of Celestine	SR 56 north of Dubois	—	—	Northern segment
SR 550	13.872	22.325	US 41/US 150 in Emison	US 50/US 150 in Wheatland	1934	current	Western segment
SR 550	9.779	15.738	US 50/US 150 in Loogootee	US 150 in Lacy	1948	current	Eastern segment
SR 552	—	—	SR 25/SR 43 south of Lafayette	US 52 southeast of Lafayette	—	1952	Replaced by SR 25
SR 555	—	—	SR 16 west of Brook	SR 114 east of Morocco	—	1966	
SR 558	1.108	1.783	US 231/SR 58 west of Crane	Crane Naval Surface Warfare Center	1953	current	
SR 562	—	—	SR 62 in Clarksville	US 31 in Clarksville	—	1960	
SR 627	—	—	US 35 in Richmond	US 27 north of Richmond	1932	1964	
SR 641	6.2	10.0	US 41/US 150 in Youngstown	I-70/US 40/SR 46 in Terre Haute	2010	current	
SR 645	1.969	3.169	US 231 west of Burns City	Crane Naval Surface Warfare Center	1953	current	
SR 650	0.879	1.415	US 50 near Willow Valley	USG Corporation plant	—	—	
SR 662	1.557	2.506	I-69 in Evansville	Ellerbusch Road in Newburgh	—	—	
SR 727	0.787	1.267	Pokagon State Park	SR 127 north of Angola	1934	current	
SR 762	—	—	Illinois state line west of Mount Vernon	SR 69 west of Mount Vernon	1947	1956	
SR 827	6.630	10.670	SR 127 in Angola	SR 120 in Fremont	1934	current	
SR 829	—	—	US 6 south of Kingsbury	US 35 north of Kingsbury	—	1952	
SR 912	11.69	18.81	I-90/Indiana Toll Road in Hammond	US 6 Business in Griffith	—	—	(Note: 900-series state roads are a low priority for INDOT, and the agency has attempted to return various ones to the local road authorities.)
SR 930	12.848	20.677	I-69/US 24/US 30/US 33 in Fort Wayne	I-469/US 30 in New Haven	1998	current	
SR 931	11.592	18.656	US 31 south of Kokomo	US 31 north of Kokomo	2013	current	Southern segment
SR 931	8.836	14.220	Marshall–St. Joseph county line	South Bend city limit	2014	current	Northern segment
SR 933	16.83	27.09	Lincolnway & Ash Road in Osceola	M-51 near Roseland	1998	current	
Former

== Special routes ==
Number	Length (mi)	Length (km)	Southern or western terminus	Northern or eastern terminus	Formed	Removed	Notes
SR 9W	—	—	SR 7 near Elizabethtown	SR 9 near Elizabethtown	1938	1939	
SR 13A	—	—	SR 8 near Lake Wawasee	US 33 in Benton Township	1953	1969	
SR 37A	—	—	SR 37 in Indianapolis	SR 37 near Noblesville	1959	1971	Allisonville Road, an old alignment of SR 37
Former
