= List of former state highways in Indiana (200–399) =

This is a list of former state highways in Indiana with route numbers from 200 through 399. For a full list of former state highways in Indiana, see the List of former state highways in Indiana.

== State Road 200 ==
State Road 200
- Location: Pendleton–East of Lynn
- Existed: 1931–1932

State Road 200 (SR 200) ran between SR 9/SR 67 and OH 200. In 1931 SR 200 was routed on the modern route of U.S. Route 36 (US 36) between SR 227 and OH 200. The state highway commission planned to continue the road west toward Pendleton at SR 9 and SR 67. Once this roadway was built the entire length of SR 200 became part of US 36.

== State Road 202 ==
State Road 202
- Location: Crown Point
- Existed: 1926–1975

State Road 202 ran between U. S. Route 231 and State Road 53 in Crown Point.

== State Road 209 ==
State Road 209
- Location: East of Greenfield–North of Willow Branch
- Existed: 1940–1972

State Road 209 ran just east of and parallel to State Road 9 in Hancock County. It connected US Highway 40 to State Road 234.

== State Road 210 ==
State Road 210
- Location: Bass Lake
- Existed: 1940s–1966

State Road 210 ran from US 35/SR 10 northwest of Bass Lake to SR 10 northeast of Bass Lake. SR 210 circled Bass Lake.

== State Road 216 ==
State Road 216
- Location: Bluffton
- Existed: Early 1990s

State Road 216 ran from State Road 316 to Bluffton Camp State Park.

== State Road 219 ==
State Road 219
- Location: Osceola
- Existed: 1935–May 21, 1999

State Road 219 was a state highway on the St. Joseph/Elkhart County line along Ash Road. It ran from U.S. Highway 33 in the south to U.S. Highway 20 in the north, a total traversal of about 2 miles (3.2 km).

US 20 and US 33 no longer intersect Ash Road. They have been replaced by Business 20 and State Road 933 on the St. Joseph County side, and Old US 20 and Old US 33 on the Elkhart County side. The State Road 219 designation was removed on May 21, 1999, as part of highway maintenance transfers stemming from the opening of the nearby St. Joseph Valley Parkway.

== State Road 220 ==
State Road 220
- Location: Rolling Prairie
- Existed: 1935–1938

State Road 220 ran from the just west of the intersection of U.S. Route 20 and State Road 2 though Rolling Prairie and then back to US 20. The route is now county roads.

== State Road 221 ==
State Road 221
- Location: Matthews–Huntington
- Existed: 1932–1976

State Road 221 was commissioned in 1932 between Matthews at SR 21 and SR 18, with an extension to Huntington in 1933. In 1972, SR 221 was removed between Matthews and SR 18, as was the section between SR 218 and Huntington. The last part of SR 221 was removed in 1975. In 1986, the road between SR 22 and SR 218 became a state road again when SR 5 was extended from Warren to SR 22 near Upland.

== State Road 223 ==
State Road 223
- Location: South Bend
- Existed: 1935–1971

State Road 223 was a northeast–southwest state highway in Saint Joseph County, Indiana. It was about 7 miles (11 km) long.

SR 223 began from the south at one of its parent routes, State Road 23. It followed the Crumstown Highway north through Crumstown. North of that town, the road turned northeast and headed toward the southwest side of South Bend. As it passed under the St. Joseph Valley Parkway (U.S. Highway 20/U.S. Highway 31 bypass), it turned due east onto Grant Road, and then terminated after almost a mile at its other parent, State Road 123, now known solely as Mayflower Road. Grant Road continues east from here as West Sample Street.

SR 223 has since been turned back to the county, and Crumstown Highway is still in use as a county road.

== State Road 230 ==
=== First routing ===
State Road 230
- Location: New Haven–Ohio line (Dawkins Road)
- Existed: 1932–c.1940

State Road 230 ran from US 24 in New Haven to OH 113 in Edgerton. A reroute of SR 14 replaced SR 230. This routing of SR 14 was later removed.

=== Second routing ===
State Road 230
- Location: Fort Wayne
- Existed: c.1955–c.1957

State Road 230 followed a former alignment of US 30 (New Haven Avenue and Coliseum Boulevard) on the southeast side of Fort Wayne after US 30 was transferred to the roads later designated as SR 930.

== State Road 231 ==
State Road 231
- Location: Clarksville
- Existed: 1931–1952

State Road 231 ran from SR 62 near Clarksville to US 31E in Clarksville. SR 231 became SR 131, until SR 131 was decommissioned in 2002.

== State Route 238 ==
State Road 238
- Location: Noblesville-Fortville
- Existed: 1980s–2011

State Road 238 was a State Route that connected Noblesville and Fortville. In the 2000s, SR 238 was truncated from its junction with SR 37 to Interstate 69 (I-69), and in 2011, the route was removed entirely.

=== Routing Changes ===
The route east of I-69 is now known as Greenfield Avenue. The portion west of I-69 was routed along Campus Parkway and Greenfield Avenue. A portion of the former routing now sits unused west of the Cabela Parkway light and east of the Bowden Ave / Greenfield Avenue light. In the early 2000s, the route was rerouted along 146th Street.

== State Road 259 ==
State Road 259
- Location: Youngstown–Blackhawk
- Existed: 1935–1937

State Road 259 ran from US 41/US 150 near Youngstown to SR 159 near Blackhawk.

== State Road 266 ==
State Road 266
- Location: Evansville
- Existed: 1950s–1960s

State Road 266 ran from US 41/US 641 in Evansville to SR 662 near Newburgh. SR 266 is now known as Washington Avenue in Evansville.

== State Road 303 ==
State Road 303
- Location: Upland–Zanesville
- Existed: 1935–1976

State Road 303 ran from SR 26 near Hartford City to SR 3 in Zanesville. SR 303 is now known as Wells County Road 300 West.

== State Road 311 ==
State Road 311
- Location: New Albany–Sellersburg
- Existed: 1980–2013

State Road 311 ran from SR 111 in New Albany to US 31 near Sellersburg. It was formerly a part of US 31W.

== State Road 313 ==
State Road 313
- Location: North of Syracuse–South of Benton
- Existed: 1939–1970

State Road 313 ran from US 6/SR 13 north of Syracuse to US 33 south of Benton. SR 313 is now known as Elkhart County Road 33, CR 33 is not related to U.S. Route 33

== State Road 316 ==
State Road 316
- Location: Bluffton
- Existed: Early 1990s

State Road 316 ran from SR 316 in Bluffton to SR 301 near Vera Cruz.

== State Road 318 ==
State Road 318
- Location: West of Keystone–South of Petroleum
- Existed: early 1940s–1972

State Road 318 ran from SR 303 west of Keystone to SR 1 south of Petroleum. SR 318 is now a county road.

== State Road 319 ==
State Road 319
- Location: Elkhart

State Road 319 was an Indiana state road in Elkhart County. It was a very short north–south route connecting U.S. Highway 20 to State Road 120 along Middleton Run Road in the east side of Elkhart. US 20 no longer reaches Middleton Run Road. US 20 was routed south of the city on the St. Joseph Valley Parkway, bypassing it, and consequently, SR 120 was truncated to Middleton Run Road after State Road 319 was decommissioned.

== State Road 324 ==
State Road 324
- Location: Fort Wayne
- Existed: 1949–1956

State Road 324 ran from US 30/US 33 near Fort Wayne to SR 230 in Fort Wayne. SR 324 was the northern east–west section of SR 930.

== State Road 329 ==
State Road 329
- Location: Logansport
- Existed: 1985-1999, 2015-–present

State Road 329 is a state road in Cass County, Indiana. Its original routing was a connector from State Road 29's northern terminus at the U.S. Highway 24/U.S. Highway 35 bypass south of the city of Logansport to State Road 17's southern terminus at Business Route 24 and State Road 25 downtown. Currently State Road 329 exists as a short connector route between State Road 29 and US 24 / US 35 / State Road 25 / State Road 29 interchange. As part of the Logansport By-Pass construction. The original last 1/3 of a mile alignment of State Road 29 was shifted to the northwest for continuity purposes to streamline traffic coming from US 24 / US 35 / State Road 25 (western half of the new interchange) to State Road 29 and eventually onward toward US 421 and Indianapolis. This shift necessitated a new route number that became State Road 329, and coincidentally starts and ends just short of the original State Road 329's 1985 to 1999 routing.

From the south, its route followed Burlington Avenue north to East Cliff Drive, where its name then changes to South 3rd Street as it rounds a curve. This is two blocks north of the northwestern terminus of the former State Road 435. SR 329 then terminated at Market Street, the current route of eastbound traffic on Business 24/SR 25. To go westbound, traffic is routed one block farther north via the start of SR 17 onto East Broadway Street.

== State Road 330 ==
State Road 330
- Location: Schererville–East of Merrillville
- Existed: 1938–1946

State Road 330 ran from US 30 in Schererville to SR 230 near Merrillville. SR 330 was an old alignment of US 30 and also of the Lincoln Highway.

== State Road 334 ==
State Road 334
- Location: Zionsville
- Length: 6.3 mi (10.1 km)
- Existed: 1935–July 13, 2011

State Road 334 in the U.S. state of Indiana was a six-mile (10 km) route in southeastern Boone County. Its western terminus was Interstate 65 and its eastern terminus was at US 421

State Road 334 was decommissioned by the Indiana Department of Transportation in the summer of 2011 and turned over to local units of government. The portion within the Town of Whitestown was turned over to it and the portion within the Town of Zionsville was turned over to it. The bridges along the route were turned over to Boone County.

== State Road 343 ==
State Road 343
- Location: Cloverdale
- Existed: 1957–1974

State Road 343 ran from SR 43 in Cloverdale west to SR 243. It ran for 4.1 miles. The road is now known as Robert Weist Avenue in Cloverdale.

== State Road 345 ==
State Road 345
- Location: Dale
- Existed: 1932–1966

State Road 345 connected the small communities of Lincoln City and Dale in Spencer County.

The southern terminus was at State Road 162 at the entrances to both the Lincoln Boyhood National Memorial and Lincoln State Park. Its northern terminus was at U.S. 231 and State Road 62 south of Dale. This intersection was relocated a short distance south when the new-terrain U.S. 231 was built.

Today, former State Road 345 is Spencer County Road 300 East. It is, at least at its southern terminus, signed as part of the Lincoln Heritage Trail which was designated in the 1960s in Illinois, Indiana and Kentucky.

== State Road 346 ==
State Road 346
- Location: Bloomington
- Existed: 1961–1966

State Road 346 ran from SR 45/SR 46 near Bloomington to SR 146 in Bloomington. SR 346 followed a part of 17th Street and Dunn Street in Bloomington, connecting State Road 46.

== State Road 367 ==
State Road 367
- Location: Indianapolis
- Existed: 1937–1960

State Road 367 was a short highway located in Marion County during the 1930s and 1960s, routed primarily along Pendleton Pike and Massachusetts Avenue. Its northern terminus was the junction with U.S. 36 and S.R. 67 at 38th Street and Pendleton Pike, and its southern terminus was the junction with U.S. 31 in downtown Indianapolis at Meridian Street. The route was sometimes marked as "Truck 367" on maps.
