= List of former state highways in Indiana (400–999) =

This is a list of former state highways in Indiana with route numbers from 400 through 999. For a full list of former state highways in Indiana, see the List of former state highways in Indiana.

== State Road 403 ==
State Road 403
- Location: Sellersburg - Charlestown
- Existed: 1932–2012

State Road 403 was a six-mile (10 km) northeast-to-southwest route that lies entirely within Clark County. It was decommissioned as a state highway and taken over by the county in 2012.

== State Road 407 ==
State Road 407
- Location: Queensville
- Existed: 1932–1937

State Road 407 ran from State Road 7 to State Road 3. The route is now Jennings County Road 350 West and CR 500 North.

== State Road 420 ==
State Road 420
- Location: Illinois State Line - Gary
- Existed: 1952–1960
- History: Was the 1st Interstate in Indiana; Route was Re-Designated I-94

State Road 420 ran from the Illinois State Line to Gary. SR 420 was the original number of Tri-State Expressway; the name was later changed to Borman Expressway.

== State Road 431 ==
State Road 431
- Location: Indianapolis
- Existed: 1933–2007

Map of Indiana State Road 431

The former State Road 431, now simply Keystone Parkway, remains a busy route connecting U.S. Route 31 with Interstate 465 at Exit 33. It passes through the Indianapolis suburb of Carmel, allowing traffic on U.S. 31 north of Carmel a shorter route to I-465 and the east side of Indianapolis. Until the 1990s, the State Road 431 designation extended south of I-465 to 86th Street. Prior to that, it also continued south along N. Keystone Avenue to S.R. 37 at Fall Creek Parkway, North Drive in Indianapolis.

State Road 431 was officially decommissioned on October 19, 2007, with the portions north of 96th Street being turned over to the city of Carmel. Carmel Mayor James Brainard immediately proposed banning heavy trucks from the route, the Hamilton County portions of which lies within his city's corporate limits. He also pushed for a plan to build six roundabout-style interchanges on Keystone, built 2009–2010, in lieu of widening it to at least six travel lanes throughout.

Further south in Marion County, a former southern portion of S.R. 431 extended south along Madison Avenue from the south side of Indianapolis through Greenwood. Madison Avenue, which was the original routing of U.S. 31 on Indy's south side, does not have an interchange with I-465, however. The northern terminus of this section was at Madison's intersection with East Street, which used to carry U.S. 31 to the south. The southern terminus was where Madison merges with existing U.S. 31 alignment in Johnson County just south of Smith Valley Road, south of the old Greenwood Middle School.

== State Road 434 ==
State Road 434
- Location: Indianapolis
- Existed: early 1940s–1962

State Road 434 ran from U.S. Route 421 to U.S. Route 31 on 73rd Street in Indianapolis.

== State Road 435 ==
State Road 435
- Location: Logansport
- Existed: September 1984–1999

State Road 435 was a northwest–southeast state highway in Cass County, Indiana. It was meant as a connector between the former State Road 329 and the U.S. Highway 24/U.S. Highway 35 bypass south of the city of Logansport.

Its route began at the bypass in the southeast and followed East Main Street for its whole route to the northwest, terminating at the former State Road 329 on Burlington Avenue.

== State Road 443 ==
State Road 443
- Location: West Lafayette
- Existed: late 1950s–2013

State Road 443 was a short state highway in West Lafayette, Indiana, less than 1.5 miles long. It ran along Happy Hollow Road for its entire length.

== State Road 469 ==
State Road 469
- Location: Fort Wayne

State Road 469 was the temporary route number of Interstate 469 around Fort Wayne. When I-469 was completed, SR 469 was decommissioned.

== State Road 513 ==
State Road 513
- Location: Converse
- Existed: early 1940s–1974

State Road 513 ran from US 35/SR 22 to 4-way stop in Converse., Indiana.

== State Road 526 ==
State Road 526
- Location: West Lafayette
- Existed: early 1940s–2013

State Road 526 was a short north–south highway connecting the Purdue University Airport with State Road 126 in West Lafayette.

== State Road 527 ==
State Road 527
- Location: Ohio State Line - Decatur
- Existed: 1932–1937

State Road 527 ran from OH 54 southeast of Pleasant Mill to US 27 in Decatur. SR 527 followed the route that US 33 now takes. SR 527 was decommissioned when US 33 was commissioned in Indiana.

== State Road 532 ==
State Road 532
- Location: Advance - Lebanon
- Existed: early 1940s–1968

State Road 532 ran from SR 75 west of Advance to SR 39 south of Lebanon.

== State Road 534 ==
State Road 534
- Location: Indianapolis
- Existed: 1942–1949

State Road 534 ran from US 40 in Indiananpolisto SR 421 in Indiananpolis. SR 534 was the original route number for SR 100.

== State Road 535 ==
State Road 535
- Location: Trafalgar
- Existed: 1942–before 1945

State Road 535 was a number used for a section of old SR 135, along what is now Johnson County Road 300W, connecting SR 135 at Trafalgar to old SR 252 (now Johnson County Road 625S). SR 535 existed from 1942 until SR 252 was rerouted due to the construction of Camp Atterbury.

== State Road 552 ==
State Road 552
- Location: Lafayette
- Existed: 1940s–1952

State Road 552 went on Teal Road, connecting US 52 and US 231/SR 25/SR 43. It has been decommissioned when SR 25 was moved onto Sagamore Parkway. As a result, SR 25 took control of Teal Rd.

== State Road 555 ==
State Road 555
- Location: Brook
- Existed: early 1940s–1966

State Road 555 ran from SR 16 west of Brook to SR 114 east of Morocco.

== State Road 562 ==
State Road 562
- Location: Clarksville
- Existed: 1956

State Road 562 ran from SR 62 in Clarksville to US 31 in Clarksville.

== State Road 627 ==
State Road 627
- Location: Richmond
- Existed: 1932–1964

State Road 627 was a short road connecting IN 38 with US 27 near Richmond in southeast Indiana. State Road 627 has since been deleted.

== State Road 762 ==
State Road 762
- Location: Illinois State Line - Mt. Vernon
- Existed: 1947–1956

State Road 762 ran from Mount Vernon west to a ferry into New Haven, Illinois. In 1956, the ferry shut down, and State Road 762 was decommissioned, following the opening of the Wabash Memorial Bridge nearby.

== State Road 829 ==
State Road 829
- Location: Kingsbury
- Existed: 1940s–1952

State Road 829 ran from US 6 south of Kingsbury to US 35 north of Kingsbury.
