= List of former state highways in Indiana (1–199) =

This is a list of former state highways in Indiana with route numbers from 1 through 199. For a full list of former state highways in Indiana, see the List of former state highways in Indiana.

== State Road 6 ==
State Road 6
- Location: Munster - East of Butler
- Existed: October 1, 1926–1932

State Road 6 ran from the Illinois state line in Munster to OH 2 east of Butler. SR 6 followed the same route as US 6 does today. It was signed before US 6 was signed in Indiana.

== State Road 21 ==
State Road 21
- Location: Ohio State Line to Peru; Amboy - Peru
- Existed: October 1, 1926–1979

State Road 21 followed the same route as US 35 does today. SR 21's first segment was decommissioned in 1965. The second part of SR 21 followed SR 19 from Amboy to Peru; this was decommissioned in 1979.

== State Road 33 ==
State Road 33
- Location: Mauckport–Bennettsville

State Road 33 ran from SR 135 in Mauckport to SR 60 in Bennettsville. SR 33 was signed until US 33 was commissioned in Indiana. SR 33 followed mostly the current southern alignment of SR 11.

== State Road 34 ==
State Road 34
- Location: Illinois State Line near Danville, IL to Indianapolis
- Existed: October 1, 1926–1950

State Road 34 ran from IL 10 near Covington to US 52 in Indianapolis. SR 34 was located where US 136 is today.

== State Road 35 ==
State Road 35
- Location: Mauckport to Indianapolis
- Existed: October 1, 1926–1934

State Road 35 followed the current route of SR 135. SR 35 was decommissioned when US 35 was commissioned in Indiana.

== State Road 73 ==
State Road 73
- Location: Schererville to Griffith
- Existed: 1969

State Road 73 ran from Joliet Street near Schererville to Ridge Road in Griffith.

== State Road 79 ==
State Road 79
- Location: Edinburgh
- Existed: 1960

State Road 79 in the U.S. state of Indiana was originally an old alignment of US Highway 31 (US 31) through Edinburgh. It followed SR 252 and Eisenhower Drive.

== State Road 100 ==
State Road 100
- Location: Indianapolis
- Existed: 1949–June 1, 1999

State Road 100 no longer exists as a state highway; the short final signed section on S. Shadeland Avenue was turned over to the city of Indianapolis in 1999. Originally a beltway around Indianapolis. it was deleted almost completely as Interstate 465 made it irrelevant as any but a local route, having been truncated to a short route between US 40 and I-465 in the early 1990s, when all signed US or state highways going through Indianapolis were diverted onto the I-465 beltway. The highway began just south of U.S. Route 52 at I-465. It traveled northward as Shadeland Avenue. It turned west at Castleton, in northeastern Marion County, following 82nd Street. Between State Road 37A (Allisonville Rd) and the distinctive bridge over the West Fork of the White River just east of State Road 431 (Keystone Ave), it became 86th Street. It continued on west along 86th to the far-northwest side of Marion County, where it connected to US 52 at Trader's Point in Boone County.

There were two other short sections of Indiana 100. The first section designated as SR 100 ran from US 40 along High School Road south to the Indianapolis Municipal (now Indianapolis International) Airport. The second, a short lived section, ran along Troy Avenue from Meridian Street (then SR 135) to Bluff Road (then SR 37). This section did not survive long after the decommissioning of SR 37 along Bluff Road.

The following places were along the highway's route:

- Indianapolis's Visteon plant
- Eastgate Mall (now closed)
- Indianapolis's Western Electric plant (closed in 1986)
- Castleton Square Mall
- North Central High School (Washington Township Schools)

== State Road 102 ==
State Road 102
- Location: Whitley County - Noble County
- Existed: 1932–1971

State Road 102 ran from SR 9 north of Columbia City to US 33 near Merriam.

== State Road 107 ==
State Road 107
- Location: Madison
- Existed: 1932–1976

State Road 107 ran from SR 56/SR 62 near Madison to US 421/SR 62 in Madison.

== State Road 112 ==
State Road 112
- Location: Elkhart
- Existed: 1937–c.1998

State Road 112 ran in Elkhart to U.S. Route 20 from State Road 19 and was originally part of U.S. Route 112 from 1926 to 1934. It has since been deleted, most of it having been incorporated into Indiana 19 as it was diverted away from downtown Elkhart.

== State Road 113 ==
State Road 113
- Location: Huntington - North Manchester
- Existed: 1932–1973

State Road 113 was an east–west road in the U.S. state of Indiana. It started on the east side of North Manchester at the junction of State Road 114, and ended north of Huntington at State Road 5. It passed through the towns of Servia and Bippus, where it intersected with State Road 105.

== State Road 118 ==
State Road 118
- Location: Southeast of Warren - East of Berne
- Existed: 1932–1964

State Road 118 ran from SR 3/SR 5 southeast of Warren to OH 707 east of Berne. It was replaced by SR 218.

== State Road 122 ==
State Road 122
- Location: South of Richmond
- Existed: 1930–1981

State Road 122 ran approximately 4.5 miles, connecting U.S. Route 27 to Indiana State Road 227 near the Wayne County Union County line, terminating at Boston.

== State Road 123 ==
State Road 123
- Location: South Bend
- Existed: 1935–1980

State Road 123 was a north–south state road in Saint Joseph County, Indiana. It ran along the western edge of the city of South Bend.

Following Mayflower Road for its entire route, it began from its parent State Road 23, southwest of the city limits. It ran for 5 miles (8.0 km) northward, interchanging with the U.S. Route 20/U.S. Route 31 bypass at about mile 2. One half mile north of that, it sprouted its own child route to the west, State Road 223 at Grant Road. Another half mile farther north, it intersected State Road 2 (which itself has been deleted east of US 31) at West Western Avenue. It then terminated at what is now Business Route 20 two miles (3 km) north of that.

Mayflower Road still has significant traffic, but SR 123 has been turned back into this local street.

== State Road 131 ==
State Road 131
- Location: Clarksville
- Existed: 1953–2002

State Road 131 in the U.S. State of Indiana was the main roadway that ran for two miles (3.2 km) through the retail district of Clarksville until 2003, when it was turned back to the city. It is now known as Lewis & Clark Parkway.

== State Road 132 ==
State Road 132
- Location: Lapel - Pendleton
- Existed: 1932–1975

State Road 132 in the U.S. State of Indiana was a road that ran for seven miles (11 km) between the towns of Pendleton and Lapel. It was decommissioned in the mid-1970s.

== State Road 133 ==
State Road 133
- Location: New Boston - New Albany
- Existed: 1935–1937

State Road 133 ran from New Boston to SR 33/SR 62 near New Albany. SR 133 was decommissioned in 1938, when U.S. Route 33 was commissioned in Indiana.

== State Road 136 ==
State Road 136
- Location: Bloomingdale - Danville
- Existed: 1932–1950

State Road 136 ran from US 41 near Bloomingdale to SR 39 near Danville. SR 136 was decommissioned in 1950, when U.S. Route 136 was commissioned in Indiana. The route number was later changed to SR 236.

== State Road 141 ==
=== Southern section ===
State Road 141
- Location: Carbondale - South of Boswell
- Existed: 1984–1989

State Road 141 ran from US 41 in Carbondale to US 41 near Boswell. SR 141 was the original route of US 41.

=== Northern section ===
State Road 141
- Location: Dyer - Hammond

State Road 141 ran from US 30 in Dyer to US 6/US 41 near Munster. SR 141 was the original route of US 41.

== State Road 146 ==
=== Western section ===
State Road 146
- Location: Spencer
- Existed: 1932–1933

State Road 146 ran from McCormick's Creek State Park to SR 46 near McCormick's Creek State Park.

=== Eastern section ===
State Road 146
- Location: Bloomington
- Existed: 1961–1966

State Road 146 ran from SR 46 near Bloomington to SR 45/SR 46 near Bloomington.
