= New Salisbury =

New Salisbury may refer to:

- New Salisbury, Indiana
- New Salisbury, Ohio
