= Indiana State Road 332 =

State highway in Indiana, United States

State Road 332
- McGalliard Road
- SR 332 highlighted in red

Route information
- Maintained by INDOT
- Length: 7.648 mi (12.308 km)

Major junctions
- West end: I-69 in Delaware County
- East end: Tillotson Avenue in Muncie

Location
- Country: United States
- State: Indiana
- Counties: Delaware

Highway system
- Indiana State Highway System; Interstate; US; State; Scenic
← SR 331	→ SR 335

State Road 332 (SR 332) is a part of the Indiana State Road that runs between Interstate 69 (I–69) and Muncie in US state of Indiana. The 7.64 miles (12.30 km) of SR 332 that lie within Indiana serve as a minor highway. No section of the highway is listed on the National Highway System. Various sections are rural four-lane divided highway and urban four-lane highway. The highway passes through farmland, residential and commercial properties.

== Route description ==
SR 332 begins at an interchange with I–69, in rural Delaware County, just east of Madison County line. West of the interchange the route is a county road, known as McGalliard Road, eventually feeding into State Road 128 at State Road 9. The route heads east towards Muncie, as a four-lane divided highway passing through farmland. The road crosses over the Norfolk Southern Railroad track and begins to enter residential properties. The highway enters Muncie and a mix of commercial and residential properties. The road enters the Ball State University campus and SR 332 ends at North Tillotson Avenue next to Ball State's Scheumann Stadium. McGalliard Road continues east through Muncie and has a traffic signal at U.S. Route 35/State Road 3/State Road 67, also known as the Muncie Bypass.

SR 332 is not included as a part of the National Highway System (NHS). The NHS is a network of highways that are identified as being most important for the economy, mobility and defense of the nation. The highway is maintained by the Indiana Department of Transportation (INDOT) like all other state roads in the state. The department tracks the traffic volumes along all state highways as a part of its maintenance responsibilities using a metric called average annual daily traffic (AADT). This measurement is a calculation of the traffic level along a segment of roadway for any average day of the year. In 2010, INDOT figured that lowest traffic levels were the 12,650 vehicles and 520 commercial vehicles used the highway daily near Muncie. The peak traffic volumes were 22,560 vehicles and 540 commercial vehicles AADT along the section of SR 332 between Morrison Road and Bethel Avenue, in Muncie.

== Major intersections ==
The entire route is in Delaware County.

Location	mi	km	Destinations	Notes
Mount Pleasant Township	0.00– 0.058	0.00– 0.093	I-69 – Indianapolis, Fort Wayne	Western terminus of SR 332; exit 241 on I-69
Muncie	7.648	12.308	Tillotson Avenue – Muncie	Eastern terminus of SR 332
1.000 mi = 1.609 km; 1.000 km = 0.621 mi

== See also ==
- State Road 32
- State Road 132
- State Road 232
