= Indiana State Road 64 =

Highway in Indiana

State Road 64
- Indiana 64
- SR 64 highlighted in red

Route information
- Maintained by INDOT
- Length: 107.49 mi (172.99 km)
- Existed: October 1, 1926–present

Major junctions
- West end: IL 15 at the Wabash River, near Mount Carmel, IL
- US 41 in Princeton; I-69 near Oakland City; US 231 in Huntingburg
- East end: I-64 / SR 62 near Edwardsville

Location
- Country: United States
- State: Indiana
- Counties: Crawford, Dubois, Floyd, Gibson, Harrison, Pike

Highway system
- Indiana State Highway System; Interstate; US; State; Scenic
← I-64	→ I-65

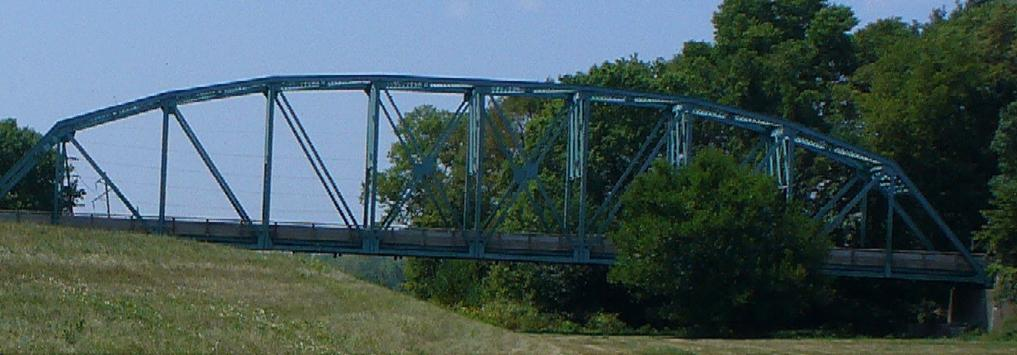
Western terminus at Illinois Route 15, this usually congested bridge once crossed the Wabash River to Mount Carmel, Illinois

State Road 64 in the U.S. state of Indiana is an east–west highway that crosses most of the southern portion of the state, covering a distance of about 107 miles (172 km).

The route parallels Interstate 64, which often causes confusion, as the widest distance between them is 20 miles (32 km) at its western terminus at the Wabash River and the two intersect at its eastern terminus near Georgetown. Both routes exist in Crawford, Dubois, Floyd, Gibson, and Harrison counties. Because of this is it is usually referred to as Indiana 64 to distinguish it from the Interstate.

== Route description ==
State Road 64 begins at a bridge across the Wabash River at Mount Carmel, Illinois, connecting it with Illinois Route 15. It ends at Interstate 64 near Edwardsville. For the bulk of its length, it runs parallel to Interstate 64 and approximately 10 miles (16 km) north of it. Most of the route is two-lane undivided highway, with undivided multi-lane segments in the city of Princeton around the junction of U.S. Route 41, and through the city of Huntingburg as well as near English.

== Traffic Congestion ==
Traffic conditions on the stretch between Princeton and Mount Carmel are notorious for often being congested with a large number of coal trucks between local mines and Gibson Generating Station, located near the route's western terminus and Illinois resident employees of both the plant and Toyota Motor Manufacturing Indiana and suppliers in Princeton using the same two lane road in their commute combined with decreases in local grocery stores resulting in more senior citizens on the main roads often result in severe traffic congestion during two distinct periods in the day. Due to the coal truck traffic from Gibson County Coal's new mine near Owensville, the Indiana 64-65 CR 650 Intersection, located halfway between Princeton and Mount Carmel, received a long-awaited upgrade from flashing lights to a full traffic light intersection in December 2014, allowing a more orderly traffic flow and reducing the amount of fatal crashes at the junction. 2 people were killed at this intersection in 2017. In addition, others have been killed in 2016 and 2017. The Gibson County Sheriff department and Indiana State Police seldom patrol this stretch of deadly highway. A new coal loading facility is being built adjacent to this stretch of highway which has already increased the number of accidents prior to the opening of the facility. Despite INDOT continuing to insist there is no need, many commuters in both Indiana and Illinois have been pushing for widening it to 4 lanes, in part or in whole from Princeton to Mount Carmel.

Until late 2010, at the western end of the highway were two very narrow bridges that typically handled at least 900–1,200 vehicles a day, doubling to ~2,000 a day vehicles during Mount Carmel's Ag Days, Lone Ranger Festival, and other holidays. Excavation began on a parallel replacement bridge in April 2008, and the new bridge was opened (with the highway realigned appropriately) in December 2010.

== Major intersections ==
County	Location	mi	km	Destinations	Notes
Gibson	White River Township	0.00	0.00	IL 15 west – Mt. Carmel	Western terminus of SR 64
Gibson	Patoka Township	4.71	7.58	SR 65 south – Owensville, Cynthiana	Western end of SR 65 concurrency
Gibson	Princeton	9.56	15.39	US 41 – Evansville, Terre Haute	
Gibson	Princeton	11.26	18.12	SR 65 north – Petersburg	Eastern end of SR 65 concurrency
Gibson	Oakland City			I-69 – Evansville, Indianapolis	
Gibson	Oakland City	22.87	36.81	SR 57 – Evansville	
Gibson	Oakland City	24.28	39.07	SR 357 north – Oakland City	To Oakland City University
Pike	Patoka Township	29.88	48.09	SR 61 – Boonville, Petersburg	
Pike	Lockhart Township	36.40	58.58	SR 257 – Stendal, Washington	
Dubois	Patoka Township	41.89	67.42	SR 161 south – Holland	Northern terminus of SR 161
Dubois	Huntingburg	46.27	74.46	US 231 – Dale, Jasper	
Dubois	Jackson Township	50.88	81.88	SR 162 – Ferdinand, Jasper	
Dubois	Birdseye	61.31	98.67	SR 145 south	Western end of SR 145 concurrency
Crawford	Patoka Township	65.66	105.67	SR 145 north – French Lick	Eastern end of SR 145 concurrency
Crawford	Eckerty			SR 37 south – Tell City	Western end of SR 37 concurrency
Crawford	English			SR 37 north / SR 237 south – Paoli	Eastern end of SR 37 concurrency; Northern terminus of SR 237
Crawford	Marengo	82.30	132.45	SR 66 west – Tell City	Western end of SR 66 concurrency
Crawford	Whiskey Run Township	85.98	138.37	SR 66 east	Eastern end of SR 66 concurrency
Harrison	Depauw	90.00	144.84	SR 337 south – Corydon	Northern terminus of SR 337
Harrison	New Salisbury			SR 135 – Corydon, Salem	
Harrison	Jackson Township	99.16	159.58	SR 335 south	Southern terminus of the southern section of SR 335
Floyd	Georgetown Township	107.49	172.99	I-64 / SR 62 – Evansville, New Albany	Eastern terminus of SR 64
1.000 mi = 1.609 km; 1.000 km = 0.621 mi: Concurrency terminus

== See also ==
- Interstate 69 and Indiana 69 - another local pairing of both Interstate and State Road numbers.
