= Indiana State Road 237 =

State highway in Indiana, United States

State Road 237
- SR 237 highlighted in red

Route information
- Maintained by INDOT
- Length: 15.316 mi (24.649 km)

Southern segment
- Length: 5.370 mi (8.642 km)
- South end: KY 69 at Cannelton
- North end: SR 37 near Tell City

Northern segment
- Length: 9.946 mi (16.007 km)
- South end: SR 62 / SR 66 at Sulphur
- Major intersections: I-64 near Sulphur
- North end: SR 37 / SR 64 at English

Location
- Country: United States
- State: Indiana
- Counties: Perry County, Crawford County

Highway system
- Indiana State Highway System; Interstate; US; State; Scenic
← SR 236	→ SR 240

Indiana State Road 237 in the U.S. state of Indiana is a discontinuous route in Perry and Crawford counties.

== Route description ==
=== Southern section ===
The Perry County segment of SR 237, which connects to SR 37 about 1-mile (1.6 km) northeast of Tell City, Indiana, provides access to Hawesville, Kentucky, via the Bob Cummings - Lincoln Trail Bridge in Cannelton, where it continues southward as Kentucky Route 69. This segment of SR 237 is 5.6 miles (9.0 km) in length and replaced an older, winding and narrow segment in 2004.

=== Northern section ===
The Crawford County segment was created on November 21, 2007, when an 8.9-mile (14.3 km) segment of SR 37 from Interstate 64 at Sulphur to SR 64 at English was renumbered as SR 237. The redesignation is due to SR 37's designation being transferred to a new route (the Frank O'Bannon Highway) from I-64 to SR 64 and SR 145 between St. Croix and Eckerty.

In 2022, SR 237 was extended south along the mile-long unnumbered stretch of Old State Road 37 between I-64 and Sulphur. The route now ends at the junction of the old highway with SR 62 and SR 66.

== Cancelled section ==
In 2008, a 2.7 mile proposed highway by-pass of Paoli, the seat of Orange County, was to carry the SR 237 designation. This project was postponed sometime around 2010 and was taken off the construction schedule in 2011.

== Major intersections ==
County	Location	mi	km	Destinations	Notes
Ohio River		0.000	0.000	Bob Cummings Lincoln Trail Bridge; Indiana–Kentucky state line	
Ohio River		0.000	0.000	KY 69 south	Continuation into Kentucky
Perry	Cannelton	0.405	0.652	SR 66 – Tell City	
Perry	Troy Township	5.370	8.642	SR 37 to I-64	Northern terminus of the southern section of SR 237
Gap in route
Crawford	Sulphur	5.371	8.644	SR 62 / SR 66	Southern terminus of the northern section of SR 237
Crawford	Union Township	6.313– 6.462	10.160– 10.400	I-64 – St. Louis, Louisville	
Crawford	English	15.242– 15.316	24.530– 24.649	SR 37 / SR 64 – New Albany, Marengo Cave National Landmark, Huntingburg	Northern terminus of SR 237
1.000 mi = 1.609 km; 1.000 km = 0.621 mi
