= Indiana State Road 334 =

State highway in Indiana, United States

State Road 334

Route information
- Maintained by INDOT
- Length: 6.26 mi (10.07 km)
- Existed: 1935–Summer 2011

Major junctions
- West end: I-65 near Zionsville
- East end: US 421 near Zionsville

Location
- Country: United States
- State: Indiana
- Counties: Boone

Highway system
- Indiana State Highway System; Interstate; US; State; Scenic
← SR 332	→ SR 335

State Road 334 in the U.S. state of Indiana was a six-mile (10 km) route in southeastern Boone County.

== Route description ==
State Road 334 connected Interstate 65 (at exit 130) with U.S. Route 421. Its western terminus was at Indianapolis Road just west of Interstate 65. It passed through the downtown area of Zionsville.

== History ==
State Road 334 was decommissioned by the Indiana Department of Transportation in the summer of 2011 and turned over to local units of government. The portion within the town of Whitestown was turned over to it, and the portion within the town of Zionsville was turned over to it. The bridges along the route were turned over to Boone County.

== Major intersections ==
The entire route was in Boone County.

Location	mi	km	Destinations	Notes
Whitestown	0.00	0.00	I-65 – Indianapolis, Gary	Western terminus of SR 334; exit number 130 on I-65
Zionsville	6.26	10.07	US 421 – Indianapolis, Frankfort	Eastern terminus of SR 334
1.000 mi = 1.609 km; 1.000 km = 0.621 mi
