= Indiana State Road 261 =

Highway in Indiana

State Road 261
- SR 261 highlighted in red

Route information
- Maintained by INDOT
- Length: 7.754 mi (12.479 km)
- Existed: 1932–present

Major junctions
- South end: SR 66 near Newburgh
- North end: SR 62 near Boonville

Location
- Country: United States
- State: Indiana
- Counties: Warrick

Highway system
- Indiana State Highway System; Interstate; US; State; Scenic
← SR 258	→ SR 262

State Road 261 in the U.S. state of Indiana is a route in southwest Warrick County.

== Route description ==
State Road 261 connects begins at State Road 66 north of Newburgh, a suburb of Evansville. It runs to the northeast past Rolling Hills Country Club and Quail Crossing Golf Club. It terminates at State Road 62 on the west side of Boonville.

== History ==
SR 261 used to continue south along Old SR 261 and State Street to end at 662

== Major intersections ==
The entire route is in Warrick County.

Location	mi	km	Destinations	Notes
Newburgh	0.000	0.000	SR 66 – Evansville, Rockport	Southern terminus of SR 261
Boonville	7.754	12.479	SR 62 – Evansville, Boonville	Northern terminus of SR 261
1.000 mi = 1.609 km; 1.000 km = 0.621 mi
