= Indiana State Road 128 =

Highway in Indiana

State Road 128
- SR 128 highlighted in red

Route information
- Maintained by INDOT
- Length: 10.865 mi (17.486 km)

Major junctions
- West end: SR 13 / SR 37 near Frankton
- East end: SR 9 near Alexandria

Location
- Country: United States
- State: Indiana
- Counties: Madison

Highway system
- Indiana State Highway System; Interstate; US; State; Scenic
← SR 127	→ SR 129

State Road 128 (SR 128) is a state road in the central part of the U.S. state of Indiana. Running for 10.865 miles (17.486 km) in a general east–west direction, connecting Frankton and rural Madison County. The western terminus is at a junction with SR 13 and SR 37, south of Elwood. The eastern terminus is at an intersection with SR 9, south of Alexandria. The highway passes through mostly agricultural and residential properties, as a two-lane roadway. SR 128 was originally introduced in the late 1930s or early 1940s, routed along its modern routing. The entire roadway was paved in the late 1960s.

== Route description ==
SR 128 begins at an intersection with SR 13/SR 37 and County Road 600S, which heads west, while SR 128 heads east. SR 128 passes through agricultural land as it heads towards Frankton. As the state road enters Frankton it makes a sharp curve with the road heading north, before a second sharp curve with the road heading east again on Plum Street. The street passes through residential properties and turns north onto Center Street, before turning east onto Sigler Street. The street passes through downtown Frankton, before passing through a residential part of town. SR 128 turns south onto 11th street for a few blocks before turning east onto Clyde Street. The street passes Frankton Elementary School, before leaving Frankton. East of Frankton SR 128 passes through farmland, with some houses. The SR 128 designation ends at an intersection with SR 9 south of Alexandria. The roadway continues east as County Road 800N, which becomes McGalliard Road, in Delaware County, before becoming SR 332 at an interchange with Interstate 69.

No segment of State Road 128 in Indiana is included in the National Highway System (NHS). The NHS is a network of highways that are identified as being most important for the economy, mobility and defense of the nation. The highway is maintained by the Indiana Department of Transportation (INDOT) like all other state roads in the state. The department tracks the traffic volumes along all state roads as a part of its maintenance responsibilities using a metric called average annual daily traffic (AADT). This measurement is a calculation of the traffic level along a segment of roadway for any average day of the year. In 2010, INDOT figured that lowest traffic levels were 1,200 vehicles and 110 commercial vehicles used the highway daily west of Frankton. The peak traffic volumes were 3,490 vehicles and 150 commercial vehicles AADT along the section east of Frankton.

== History ==
SR 128 was assumed into the state road system between 1939 and 1941. At the time, the highway started at the SR 13/SR 37 and ran east through Frankton to SR 9 much as it does today. The entire was paved between 1966 and 1967. Since its paving, the route has not undergone any major changes.

== Major intersections ==
The entire route is in Madison County.

Location	mi	km	Destinations	Notes
Pipe Creek Township	0.000	0.000	SR 13 / SR 37	Western terminus of SR 128
Monroe Township	10.865	17.486	SR 9	Eastern terminus of SR 128
1.000 mi = 1.609 km; 1.000 km = 0.621 mi
