= Indiana State Road 443 =

Former state highway in Indiana, United States

State Road 443
- Happy Hollow Road
- SR 443 highlighted in red

Route information
- Maintained by INDOT
- Length: 1.38 mi (2.22 km)
- History: Relinquished 2013

Major junctions
- South end: SR 43 in West Lafayette
- North end: US 52 in West Lafayette

Location
- Country: United States
- State: Indiana
- Counties: Tippecanoe

Highway system
- Indiana State Highway System; Interstate; US; State; Scenic
← SR 441	→ SR 445

State Road 443 was a short state highway in West Lafayette, Indiana, less than 1.5 miles long. It ran along Happy Hollow Road for its entire length.

== Route description ==
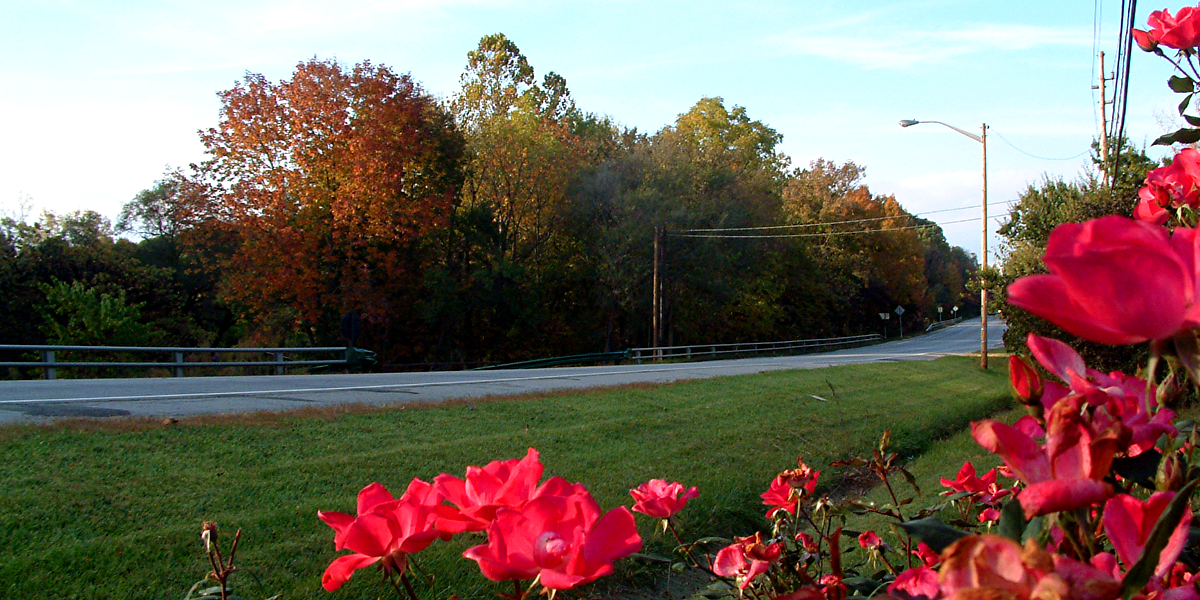
Looking up Happy Hollow Road near the park.

State Road 443 departed from its parent route, State Road 43, just north of State Road 26 in West Lafayette. While State Road 43 continues to the north-northeast, State Road 443 traveled north-northwest, ascending from the flood plain of the Wabash River past Happy Hollow Park to the level of the surrounding terrain where it connected with the former U.S. Route 52, serving as a connector between the two highways, which are grade-separated. Due to the realignment of US 52 to the west and south of West Lafayette in September 2013 with US 231, the route was removed in December 2013.

== Major intersections ==
The entire route is in West Lafayette, Tippecanoe County.

mi	km	Destinations	Notes
0.00	0.00	SR 43 – Lafayette	Southern terminus of SR 443
1.38	2.22	US 52 – Indianapolis	Northern terminus of SR 443
1.000 mi = 1.609 km; 1.000 km = 0.621 mi
