= Johnson Township, Crawford County, Indiana =

Johnson Township
- Township
- Location of Johnson Township in Crawford County
- Coordinates: 38°17′42″N 86°37′24″W
- Country: United States
- State: Indiana
- County: Crawford

Government
  - Type: Indiana township

Area
  - Total: 24.15 sq mi (62.5 km^{2})
  - Land: 24.15 sq mi (62.5 km^{2})
  - Water: 0 sq mi (0 km^{2})
- Elevation: 548 ft (167 m)

Population (2020)
  - Total: 408
  - Density: 16.9/sq mi (6.52/km^{2})
- FIPS code: 18-38646
- GNIS feature ID: 453511

Johnson Township is one of nine townships in Crawford County, Indiana. As of the 2020 census, its population was 408 and it contained 223 housing units.

Historical population
Census	Pop.	Note	%±
1890	1,143		—
1900	1,018		−10.9%
1910	908		−10.8%
1920	826		−9.0%
1930	659		−20.2%
1940	658		−0.2%
1950	557		−15.3%
1960	501		−10.1%
1970	503		0.4%
1980	453		−9.9%
1990	526		16.1%
2000	556		5.7%
2010	484		−12.9%
2020	408		−15.7%
Source: US Decennial Census

== Geography ==
According to the 2010 census, the township has a total area of 24.15 square miles (62.5 km^{2}), all land.

=== Unincorporated towns ===
- Eckerty

(This list is based on USGS data and may include former settlements.)

=== Adjacent townships ===
- Patoka Township (northeast)
- Union Township (east)
- Oil Township, Perry County (southeast)
- Clark Township, Perry County (southwest)
- Jefferson Township, Dubois County (west)

=== Cemeteries ===
The township contains four cemeteries: Blunk, Davis, Gilmore and Potter.
