= Indiana State Road 160 =

State highway in Indiana, United States

State Road 160
- SR 160 highlighted in red

Route information
- Maintained by INDOT
- Length: 18.735 mi (30.151 km)

Major junctions
- West end: SR 60 / SR 135 at Salem
- I-65 at Henryville
- East end: US 31 at Henryville

Location
- Country: United States
- State: Indiana
- Counties: Clark, Scott, Washington

Highway system
- Indiana State Highway System; Interstate; US; State; Scenic
← SR 159	→ SR 161

State Road 160 in the U.S. state of Indiana is a narrow two-lane road that crosses the scenic hill country of Washington, Scott and Clark counties.

== Route description ==
The western terminus of State Road 160 is in Salem at its parent route, State Road 60. It passes to the south of the Clark State Forest just before reaching Henryville, where it intersects with Interstate 65 (Exit 19) and U.S. Route 31.

== History ==
SR 160 from Charlestown to Henryville was number State Road 39. In September 2012, INDOT gave the section of roadway from US 31 to SR 403 to Clark County.

== Major intersections ==
County	Location	mi	km	Destinations	Notes
Washington	Salem	0.000	0.000	SR 60 / SR 135 – Sellersburg	Western terminus of SR 160
Scott	No major junctions				
Clark	Henryville	18.149– 18.262	29.208– 29.390	I-65 – Indianapolis, Louisville	Exit number 19 on I-65
Clark	Henryville	18.735	30.151	US 31 – Sellersburg, Seymour	Eastern terminus of SR 160
1.000 mi = 1.609 km; 1.000 km = 0.621 mi
