= Indiana State Road 329 =

State highway in Indiana, United States

State Road 329
- Burlington Avenue
- SR 329 highlighted in red

Route information
- Maintained by INDOT
- Length: 0.355 mi (571 m)
- Existed: 1984-1999, 2015-–present

Major junctions
- South end: SR 29 near Logansport
- North end: US 24 / US 35 / SR 25 in Logansport

Location
- Country: United States
- State: Indiana
- Counties: Cass

Highway system
- Indiana State Highway System; Interstate; US; State; Scenic
← SR 327	→ SR 331

State Road 329 (SR 329) is a State Road in the northern section of the state of Indiana. Running for about 0.335 miles (0.539 km) in a general northeast–southwest direction, connecting SR 29 and U.S. Route 24/U.S. Route 35/SR 25. SR 329 was originally introduced in the mid-1930s routed between Zionsville and SR 29. That segment of SR 329 was renumber to SR 334 by the late 1930s. SR 329 was commissioned again in September 1984 replacing SR 29 through Logansport. This designation of SR 329 lasted until 1999. The current designation of SR 329 was created when the Hoosier Heartland Highway in Logansport was completed.

== Route description ==
SR 329 begins at an intersection with SR 29 south of Logansport. The road travels northeast, along with Burlington Avenue, as a two-lane road, passing through a residential area. SR 329 ends at an interchange with US 24/US 35. SR 25 continues northeast on Burlington Avenue from the end of SR 329. In 2014 the only location for a traffic count along SR 329 shows that 3,476 vehicles travel the highway on average each day.

== History ==
=== Previous designations ===
SR 329 was originally designated in between Zionsville and SR 29, in 1935. By 1938 SR 329 was decommissioned and the route replace with a newly extended SR 334. SR 334 was removed from this route in 2011.

=== Current designation ===
SR 329 was unused until September 1984 when the new route of US 24, US 35, and SR 29 open in the Logansport area. SR 329 began at an intersection with SR 29, SR 329 continued north on Burlington Avenue. Burlington Avenue curves and crosses over the Wabash River and the name changes to 3rd Street. SR 329 then terminated at the intersection between 3rd Street and Market Street, at the time SR 25. SR 17 continued north on 3rd Street. Indiana Department of Transportation removed the SR 329 designation in 1999. When the Hoosier Heartland Highway in Logansport was completed SR 329 was which again signed along a small segment of Burlington Avenue.

== Major intersections ==
The entire route is in Cass County.

Location	mi	km	Destinations	Notes
Washington Township	0.000	0.000	SR 29	
Logansport	0.355	0.571	US 24 / US 35 / SR 25	
1.000 mi = 1.609 km; 1.000 km = 0.621 mi
