= Indiana State Road 335 =

State highway in Indiana, United States

State Road 335
- SR 335 highlighted in red

Route information
- Maintained by INDOT
- Length: 14.368 mi (23.123 km)

Southern segment
- Length: 4.471 mi (7.195 km)
- South end: SR 135 near Crandall
- North end: SR 64 near Crandall

Northern segment
- Length: 9.897 mi (15.928 km)
- South end: US 150 in Greenville
- North end: SR 60 in New Pekin

Location
- Country: United States
- State: Indiana
- Counties: Harrison, Floyd, Washington

Highway system
- Indiana State Highway System; Interstate; US; State; Scenic
← SR 332	→ SR 337

State Road 335 in the U.S. state of Indiana consists of a northern and southern route.

== Route description ==
=== Southern section ===
The southern route is about five miles (8 km) long. It connects State Road 64, three miles (5 km) east of New Salisbury, with State Road 135 (its parent route) between New Salisbury and Corydon. Halfway along this road is the town of Crandall.

=== Northern section ===
The northern route is a north–south route that connects the rural areas of northwestern Floyd County and southeastern Washington County. Its southern terminus is U.S. Route 150 near Greenville with the northern terminus at Indiana 60 near Pekin. Halfway through the twelve-mile (19 km) route it passes through the tiny town of Martinsburg.

== Major intersections ==
County	Location	mi	km	Destinations	Notes
Harrison	Jackson Township	0.000	0.000	SR 135 – Corydon, New Salisbury	Southern terminus of SR 335
Harrison	Jackson Township	4.471	7.195	SR 64 – New Salisbury, Georgetown	Northern terminus of the southern section of SR 335
Gap in route
Floyd	Greenville Township	4.472	7.197	US 150	Southern terminus of the northern section of SR 335
Washington	New Pekin	14.368	23.123	SR 60 – Salem, Borden	Northern terminus of SR 335
1.000 mi = 1.609 km; 1.000 km = 0.621 mi
