= Indiana State Road 342 =

Former state highway in Indiana, United States

State Road 342
- SR 342 highlighted in red

Route information
- Maintained by INDOT
- Length: 0.347 mi (558 m)

Major junctions
- South end: Air National Guard at Terre Haute
- North end: SR 42

Location
- Country: United States
- State: Indiana

Highway system
- Indiana State Highway System; Interstate; US; State; Scenic
| ← SR 341 | → SR 350 |

State Road 342 (SR 342) was a north–south State Road in Vigo County, Indiana. Running for about 0.347 miles (0.558 km) along the east side of the Terre Haute Regional Airport, connecting the airport to SR 42. The close proximity to a runway at the airport would result in its removal as a public roadway.

== Route description ==
SR 342 began at the entrance to the Indiana Air National Guard's 181st Fighter Wing, housed at Terre Haute Regional Airport. The road ran north near the end of a runway at the airport to an intersection with SR 42. SR 342 ended at SR 42, but the roadway continued north as Chamberlain Street. The final traffic count for SR 342 was in 2013, where 863 vehicles travel the road on average each day.

== History ==
In 2014 the Federal Aviation Administration requested the closure of SR 342, due to it being within the runway protection zone. The Indiana Department of Transportation (INDOT) and Terre Haute Regional Airport came to an agreement to build a new road east of SR 342, connecting to Swalls Road. This new road would be outside of the runway protection zone and also provide a new secure entrance to the 181st Intelligence Wing of the Indiana Air National Guard. With the opening of the new road INDOT decommissioned and closed SR 342.

== Major intersections ==
The entire route is in Terre Haute, Vigo County.

| mi | km | Destinations | Notes |
|---|---|---|---|
| 0.000 | 0.000 | 79th Street | Southern terminus of SR 342 |
| 0.347 | 0.558 | SR 42 | Northern terminus of SR 342 |
1.000 mi = 1.609 km; 1.000 km = 0.621 mi
