= Indiana State Road 60 =

State highway in Indiana, United States

State Road 60
- SR 60 highlighted in red

Route information
- Maintained by INDOT
- Length: 62.21 mi (100.12 km)

Major junctions
- West end: US 50 near Mitchell
- East end: US 31 near Sellersburg

Location
- Country: United States
- State: Indiana
- Counties: Clark, Lawrence, Orange, Washington

Highway system
- Indiana State Highway System; Interstate; US; State; Scenic
| ← SR 59 | → SR 61 |

State Road 60 in the U.S. state of Indiana is a mostly rural, two-lane highway in the southeastern portion of the state, covering a distance of about 62 miles (100 km).

== Route description ==
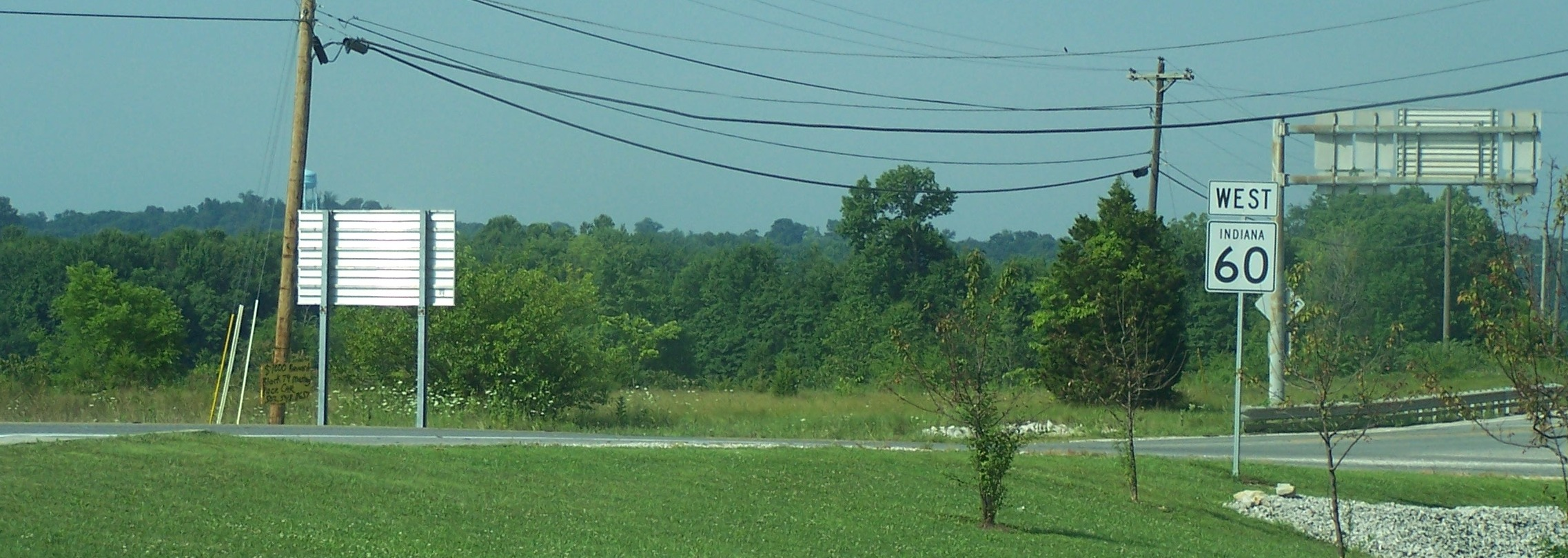
State Road 60 heads west.

SR 60 begins at U.S. Route 50 east of Huron in southern Lawrence County and runs east towards Mitchell. In Mitchell, SR 60 is concurrent with State Road 37. After Mitchell SR 60 heads southeast toward Salem, passing through Campbellsburg. In Salem SR 60 are concurrent with State Road 56 and State Road 135. Southeast from downtown Salem SR 60 has an intersection with Indiana State Road 160. SR 60 leaves Salem heading south-southeast towards Sellersburg, passing through New Pekin, Borden, and Bennettsville. In Sellersburg SR 60 passes over Interstate 65 (I-65), followed by an intersection at U.S. Route 31.

== History ==
Western section of SR 60 from US 50 to SR 37 was numbered State Road 250 until 1939.

== Major intersections ==
| County | Location | mi | km | Destinations | Notes |
|---|---|---|---|---|---|
| Lawrence | Spice Valley Township | 0.00 | 0.00 | US 50 – Loogootee, Bedford | Western terminus of SR 60 |
| Lawrence | Mitchell | 8.81 | 14.18 | SR 37 north – Bedford | Northern end of SR 37 concurrency |
| Lawrence | Mitchell | 9.58 | 15.42 | SR 37 south – Orleans | Southern end of SR 37 concurrency |
| Orange | No major junctions | | | | |
| Washington | Salem | 31.45 | 50.61 | SR 56 west – Paoli | Western end of SR 56 concurrency |
| Washington | Salem | 32.91 | 52.96 | SR 56 east / SR 135 north – Scottsburg, Brownstown | Eastern end of SR 56 concurrency; Northern end of SR 135 concurrency |
| Washington | Salem | 33.72 | 54.27 | SR 135 south – Corydon | Southern end of SR 135 concurrency |
| Washington | Salem | 35.45 | 57.05 | SR 160 east – Charlestown | Western terminus of SR 160 |
| Washington | New Pekin | 43.04 | 69.27 | SR 335 south – Greenville | Northern terminus of SR 335 |
| Clark | Sellersburg | 60.77 | 97.80 | I-65 – Indianapolis, Louisville | Exit 7 on I-65 |
| Clark | Sellersburg | 62.21 | 100.12 | US 31 – Sellersburg, Jeffersonville | Eastern terminus of SR 60 |
1.000 mi = 1.609 km; 1.000 km = 0.621 mi: Concurrency terminus
