= Indiana State Road 37 =

State highway in Indiana

State Road 37
- SR 37 highlighted in red

Route information
- Maintained by INDOT
- Length: 157 mi (253 km)
- Existed: October 1, 1926–present

Southern segment
- Length: 96 mi (154 km)
- South end: SR 66 in Tell City
- Major intersections: I-64 in St. Croix
- North end: I-69 near Bloomington

Central segment
- Length: 46.6 mi (75.0 km)
- South end: I-69 in Fishers
- North end: SR 9 in Marion

Northern segment
- Length: 14.4 mi (23.2 km)
- South end: I-469 / US 24 / US 30 in Fort Wayne
- Major intersections: SR 101 in Springfield Township
- North end: SR 2 in Scipio Township

Location
- Country: United States
- State: Indiana
- Counties: Perry, Crawford, Orange, Lawrence, Monroe, Hamilton, Madison, Grant, Allen

Highway system
- Indiana State Highway System; Interstate; US; State; Scenic
← US 36	→ SR 38

State Road 37 (SR 37) is a major route in the U.S. state of Indiana, running as a four-lane divided highway for a majority of its course in Southern and Central Indiana.

At one time, the route ran from the southwest corner of the state to the northeast corner. In the pre-Interstate Highway era, SR 37 was the most direct route between Fort Wayne, Indianapolis, and Bloomington. Interstate 69 (I-69) has supplanted it as a through route, and SR 37 now consists of three disconnected segments, with the segment through Indianapolis being replaced entirely by I-69 in 2024. The longest segment starts at Tell City on the Ohio River and ends in Bloomington in south central Indiana. Another shorter segment resumes off I-69 and runs northeast to SR 9 in Marion. The other segment in northeastern Indiana runs from I-469 near Fort Wayne to the Ohio state line.

== Route description ==
=== Southern segment ===
The southern segment of SR 37 begins at a junction with SR 66 near the Ohio River in Tell City. Angling northeast, it enters the Hoosier National Forest then turns north until it meets I-64 just north of SR 62 at St. Croix. SR 37 now continues north beyond I-64, to eventually meet SR 64 near Eckerty. These two routes then run concurrently to the east for about eight miles (13 km), where just north of English SR 37 departs to the north toward Paoli and SR 64 continues east toward Marengo. Just prior to reaching Paoli SR 37 leaves the National Forest. Once in town the route has a very brief (two-block) concurrency with US 150 and SR 56 to loop around the town square before it leaves to the north, heading for Orleans and Mitchell.

Until reaching Mitchell, SR 37 is a two-lane rural route with relatively light traffic. However, from this point north to Bloomington, the character of the road changes to become a major rural arterial route. At Mitchell the four-lane divided highway begins with a short concurrency of SR 60 on SR 37 as both routes skirt the edge of town. From there, SR 37 continues north to US 50 on the outskirts of Bedford. US 50 and SR 37 then run concurrently, curving northeast to cross the East Fork of the White River before turning north to bypass the center of the city on its west side. After US 50 leaves to the east, SR 37 proceeds northward to Bloomington, where it now meets up with I-69 to the southwest just outside of that city. This interchange marks the northern terminus of the southern segment.

The portions of SR 37 between Tell City and I-64, and from Paoli to Bedford, were designated as the Frank O'Bannon Highway, to honor the late former governor, following his death in 2003. Between the two SR 37 segments, the O'Bannon Highway designation follows SR 145, SR 56 and US 150 past Patoka Lake, through French Lick and West Baden Springs to Paoli.

=== Central segment ===
SR 37 resumes as a four-lane freeway off exit 205 of I-69 in Fishers and heads northward. It has a few interchanges with local roads before the freeway segment ends north of 146th Street. SR 37 then passes just east of Noblesville, meeting SR 32 and SR 38 before leaving Noblesville proper.

Northeast of Noblesville, SR 37 reverts to a two-lane rural highway. Along the Hamilton—Madison county line, it runs concurrently with SR 13 until those routes split just south of Elwood. From there, SR 37 angles north-northeast to reach the northern terminus of the central segment at SR 9 just south of Marion.

=== Northern segment ===
The northern segment of SR 37 begins at a junction with I-469 on the northeast side of Fort Wayne. From there it runs northeast approximately 20 miles (32 km), passing through Harlan, to terminate at the Ohio state line near the Allen–DeKalb county line. SR 37 enters Dekalb County for approximately 100 feet (33 meters) before crossing the state line into Ohio. The road continues northeast in Ohio as State Route 2, to Hicksville, Ohio and beyond.

== History ==
=== Southern segment ===
SR 37 was once a section of the Dixie Highway from Indianapolis to Paoli.

In the 1950s, SR 37 ran north of Bloomington on the roads now called Cascades Drive and Old 37 to the northern end of Monroe County. South of Bloomington, SR 37 followed Walnut Street Pike, Fairfax Road, Valley Mission Road, Guthrie Road, and Kentucky Hollow Road (Old 37) to Oolitic. These were replaced in the late 1950s and early 1960s with the straighter sections called College Avenue and Walnut Street north of Bloomington and the sections called Walnut Street and Old 37 (Kentucky Hollow Road) south to Oolitic. As soon as the current four-lane SR 37 was finished in 1976, a portion of Kentucky Hollow Road was abandoned north of Oolitic and a stone quarry that was alongside SR 37 for years consumed the road.

SR 37 now turns to the east and is concurrent with SR 64 from Eckerty to English, where it exits the eastbound highway and rejoins the old route. The old, winding stretch of 37 from I-64 at exit 86 north to English has been designated as SR 237. Between 2009 and 2014, this change also eliminated the SR 37 concurrency with I-64 between that route's exits 79 and 86.

=== Bloomington to Indianapolis ===
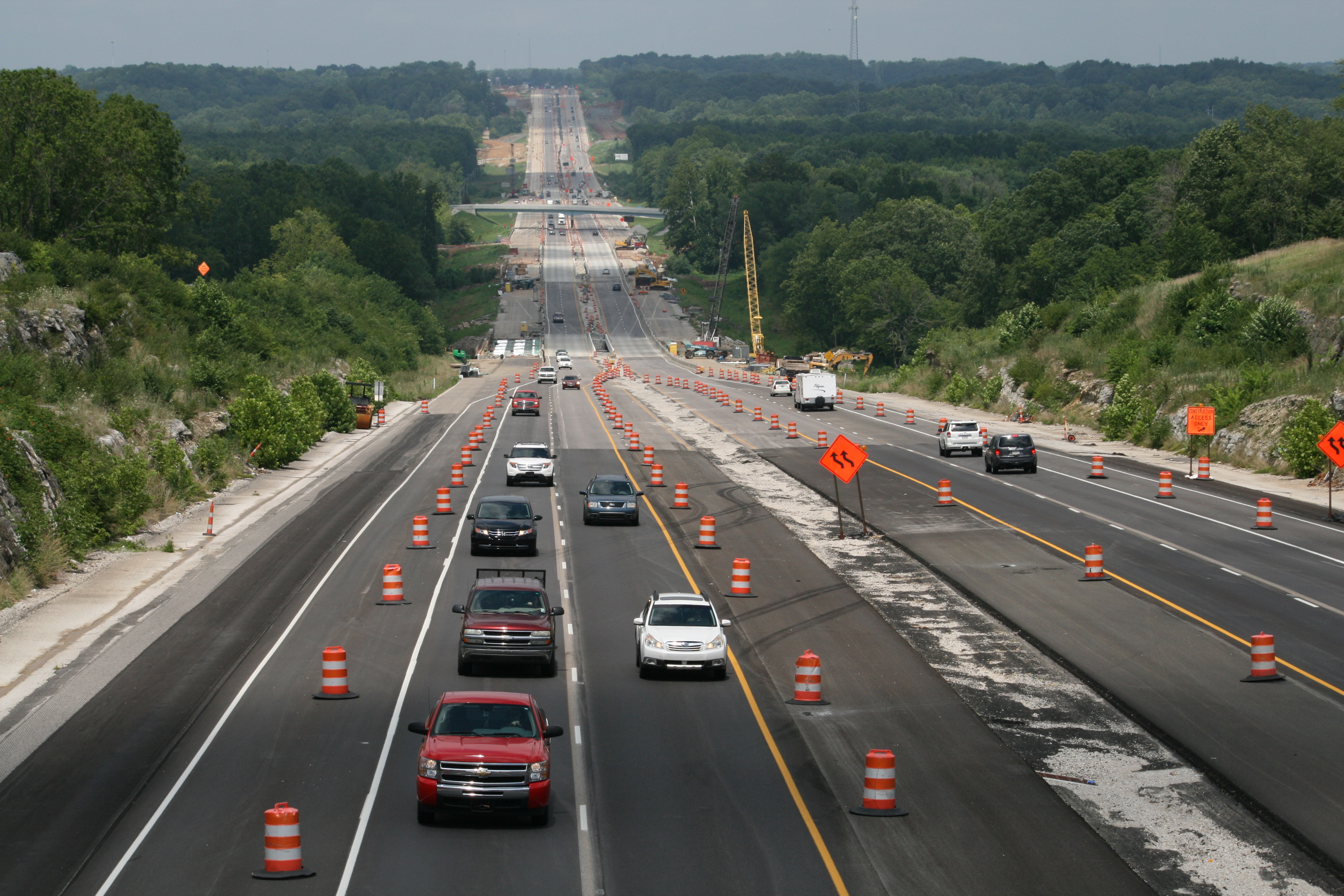
Construction on upgrading SR 37 to I-69 in Monroe County in 2017.

Before 2024, SR 37 ran continuously from the northern end of the southern segment at I-69 southwest of Bloomington north to the Indianapolis area. This segment was gradually upgraded and reopened with Interstate Highway standards, with I-69 gradually extended concurrently along SR 37. After completing this segment of I-69 in August 2024, SR 37 signage was removed, truncating it and splitting it further into three disconnected segments.

=== Indianapolis ===
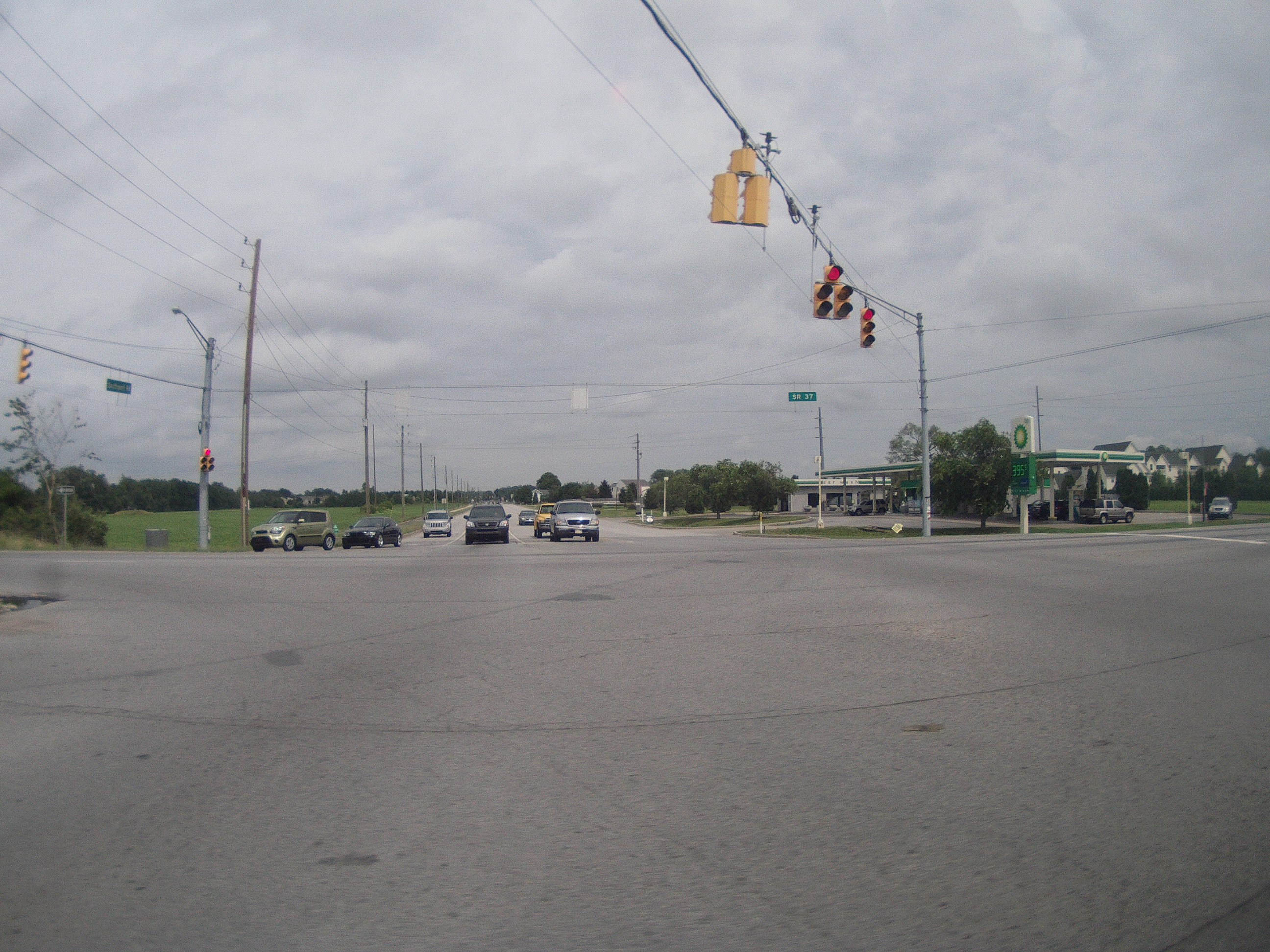
The at-grade intersection of SR 37 and Southport Road in Indianapolis in 2013; it was reconstructed as a diamond interchange for I-69.

SR 37 originally ended at the junction of SR 35 (SR 135) and US 31 at Meridian and South Streets downtown. The route that became SR 37 was initially numbered SR 13 in Marion and most of Hamilton Counties. SR 13 began at Meridian and Michigan Streets, then the junction of US 31, SR 13, and SR 367.

SR 13 followed Meridian St. (US 31) north to Fall Creek Parkway N. Drive, where it turned northeast. SR 13 then followed Fall Creek and Allisonville Road to Strawtown in Hamilton County, where what is now SR 37 was undesignated until 1940. In 1940, the portion from north of Strawtown to south of Elwood was made part of SR 13. From south of Elwood to Marion, the road now SR 37 was numbered SR 15. By 1945, the entire route described above became a continuation of SR 37 from the south side of Indianapolis. SR 37 was designated along Michigan Street (westbound) and Vermont Street (eastbound) from Meridian Street to West Street (at the time US 36, SR 29, and SR 67). SR 37 then turned south on West Street until it became Bluff Road, which was already part of SR 37. (This also removed the Bluff Road section of SR 37 from the state road system, removing the connection with SR 135.)

In 1953, the state rerouted SR 37 to overlap US 36/SR 67 along 38th Street starting at Fall Creek Parkway. (This would be part of the route the road would follow until decommissioning in 1999 or 2000.) The three roads would be multiplexed from 38th and Fall Creek, to 38th and Northwestern Avenue (now Dr. MLK Jr. Street), then south along Northwestern Avenue and West Street until the above-mentioned location at Michigan and West streets.

In 1957, construction was started on the Noblesville Bypass of SR 37. This bypass was designed to go to the east side of Noblesville, through Fishers, and along a newly constructed road in Marion County to connect to Fall Creek Parkway just north of the then route of SR 37 (Allisonville Road). One of the "quirks" in the design of the new SR 37 was a five-point intersection with SR 100, at the corner of Shadeland Road (now Avenue) and 82nd Street. By 1958, SR 37's Noblesville bypass was completed to the junction with SR 100 from the north. SR 37 then was rerouted along 82nd Street to Allisonville, where it turned south to connect to Fall Creek Parkway has it had for the previous 35 years. By 1959, the new route was completed, and the Allisonville Road route was renumbered SR 37A.

In the early to mid-1960s, two changes were made to SR 37. One which would eventually become part of I-69: interchanges were built at SR 100 and 116th Street, as well as a connection to the under construction I-465. The second was the construction of an exit ramp (now exit 4) on I-465 for the eventual construction of a Bluff Road bypass through southern Marion and northern Johnson Counties.

In 1967, there were two SR 37s on the south side of Indianapolis: one along Bluff Road and one along the Bluff Road bypass. The two did not directly connect at all. By 1969, SR 37 was multiplexed with US 31 (along Meridian, North, Pennsylvania/Delaware, Madison and East streets) to I-465/I-74 at what is now exit 2. The route was multiplexed with I-465/I-74 between exits 2 and 4. This caused the Bluff Road route to be abandoned in its connections to the state road system, so it was decommissioned. Some unofficial maps listed Bluff Road as SR 37A for some time after this, although the state of Indiana never recognized it as such.

By 1972, I-69 was completed along the SR 37 corridor from I-465 to where it had ended to that point at the junction with SR 37 Noblesville bypass (now exit 205).

SR 37 stayed much the same until 1999 or 2000 when all state and US highway designations were completely removed from inside the I-465 loop. SR 37 was then officially rerouted along I-465 along Indianapolis's east and south sides. The interchanges for SR 37 from I-465 were exit 4 and exit 37.

In August 2024, SR 37 was removed entirely from the Indianapolis area, as I-69 had largely replaced it south of Indianapolis. SR 37 used to run on what is now I-69 until just south of exit 162, just south of I-465, before turning slightly northeastward to meet I-465 at exit 4. It then routed eastwards along the eastern half of I-465 to exit 37, splitting concurrently with I-69 and following I-69 before meeting with the southern terminus of the central segment, where it splits off at exit 205 like it does today.

=== Central and northern segments ===
In 1940, the section of SR 37 from its current northern junction with SR 13 to Marion (west of its current routing) was designated SR 15. Another section that was to become SR 37, from Fort Wayne northeast to the Ohio border, was already designated SR 14.

By 1945, SR 37 had been routed along its current route from Rigdon to the south of Marion to the junction of SR 9. SR 37 was then overlapped along SR 9 from that junction to Huntington, then with US 24 from Huntington to Fort Wayne. The state then moved SR 14 from what became SR 37 to what was SR 230.

In Fort Wayne, the combined US 24/SR 37 followed Upper Huntington Road (now Jefferson Boulevard) until it met with SR 14 at Illinois Road. Just beyond that junction, the three routes split into a one-way pair, with Jefferson Boulevard and Maumee Avenue handling eastbound traffic and Washington Boulevard used for westbound travel. East of downtown, SR 37 departed the pairing with US 24/SR 14, turning north onto Anthony Boulevard to cross the Maumee River. Roughly 1.5 miles (2.4 km) later, the route turned northeast onto Crescent Avenue, which becomes Stellhorn Road at Hobson Road/St. Joe Road as it curves to run due east. Finally, SR 37 turned (later curved) onto Maysville Road, angling northeast again and then passing where an interchange would eventually be built with the I-469 beltway (where the north segment of this state road now begins).

In the 1970s, an expansion of the Anthony Boulevard section to four lanes was planned; this was successfully lobbied against by the North Anthony Neighborhood Association.

By 1980, the official multiplex along SR 9 and US 24 was decommissioned (although there is a reference to SR 37 being multiplexed along I-69 around the west side of Fort Wayne in 1980, that reference was gone by 1982). This created the northern section of SR 37, with its origin point located at Crescent Avenue and Coliseum Boulevard (then US 30, now SR 930) in Fort Wayne. When I-469 was completed, the mileage between Coliseum Boulevard and I-469 was decommissioned and returned to local control.

To improve traffic flow along SR 37 north of where it branches off I-69, the communities of Fishers and Nobleville started a project to reconstruct drainage lines and remove five signalized intersections. Work on the drainage lines was started in September 2018 and completed by February 2020 while the 135th Street intersection was converted to a pair of right-in/right-outs. The other four intersections are to be converted into interchanges and will be completed in phases. Phase three converted the East 146th Street intersection into a single-point urban interchange while phases one and three converted the intersections at East 126th Street and East 131st Street to dogbone interchanges. These phases were completed by September 2022. In January 2023, pre-construction on the final phase, which will change the 141st Street intersection to a dogbone interchange, changed the intersection to right-in/right-out to improve traffic flow. A timeline for construction of the interchange was to be provided once project bids are made in summer 2023, and was tentatively scheduled to begin in September 2023 and be completed by October 2025. However, the cost of construction and labor rose due to other construction projects in central Indiana, and the bid process was delayed by six months. Construction is now not expected to begin until summer 2024.

== Major intersections ==
County	Location	mi	km	Destinations	Notes
Perry	Tell City	0.0	0.0	SR 66 – Evansville, Tell City	Southern terminus of SR 37
Perry	Troy Township	2.0	3.2	SR 237 south – Cannelton	Northern terminus of the southern section of SR 237
Perry	Anderson Township	5.0	8.0	SR 145 north – St. Meinrad	Southern terminus of SR 145
Perry	Union Township	10.6	17.1	SR 70 east – Derby	Western terminus of SR 70
Perry	St. Croix	21.9	35.2	SR 62 – Evansville, New Albany	
Perry	St. Croix	22.1	35.6	I-64 – St. Louis, Louisville	
Crawford	Eckerty	29.3	47.2	SR 64 west – Huntingburg	Western end of SR 64 concurrency
Crawford	English	37.5	60.4	SR 64 east / SR 237 south – Sulphur, Georgetown	Eastern end of SR 64 concurrency; northern terminus of SR 237
Orange	Paoli	54.4	87.5	US 150 west / SR 56 west – Loogootee, Jasper	Western end of US 150 and SR 56 concurrency
Orange	Paoli	54.5	87.7	US 150 east / SR 56 east – New Albany, Salem	Eastern end of US 150 and SR 56 concurrency
Orange	Orleans	62.2	100.1	SR 337 south	Northern terminus of SR 337
Lawrence	Mitchell	66.9	107.7	SR 60 east – Salem	Southern end of SR 60 concurrency
Lawrence	Mitchell	67.7	109.0	SR 60 west – Georgia	Northern end of SR 60 concurrency
Lawrence	Marion Township	73.5	118.3	US 50 west – Shoals, Washington, Vincennes	Southern end of US 50 concurrency
Lawrence	Bedford	77.4	124.6	US 50 east / SR 450 to SR 158 – Bedford, Seymour	Northern end of US 50 concurrency
Lawrence	Bedford	78.2	125.9	SR 58 east – Columbus	Southern end of SR 58 concurrency
Lawrence	Oolitic	81.3	130.8	SR 54 west / SR 58 west – Avoca	Eastern terminus of SR 54; northern end of SR 58 concurrency
Monroe	Bloomington	96.0	154.5	I-69 – Evansville, Indianapolis	I-69 exit 114; northern terminus of southern section
Gap in route
Hamilton	Fishers	169.3	272.5	I-69 south – Indianapolis	Directional access (northbound I-69/SR 37 to northbound SR 37 and southbound SR 37 to southbound I-69/SR 37) only; southern terminus of central section
Hamilton	Fishers	169.8	273.3	126th Street	Dogbone interchange
Hamilton	Fishers	170.3	274.1	131st Street	Dogbone interchange
Hamilton	Fishers	170.7	274.7	135th Street	Pair of right-in/right-outs
Hamilton	Fishers	171.3	275.7	141st Street	Dogbone interchange
Hamilton	Noblesville	171.8	276.5	146th Street	Single-point urban interchange; northern end of freeway
Hamilton	Noblesville	175.04	281.70	SR 32 / SR 38 – Noblesville, Anderson, Pendleton	
Madison	Jackson Township	186.76	300.56	SR 13 south – Lapel	Southern end of SR 13 concurrency
Madison	Elwood	193.04	310.67	SR 13 north – Elwood	Northern end of SR 13 concurrency
Madison	Elwood	195.73	315.00	SR 28 – Tipton, Elwood, Albany	
Grant	Hackleman	207.23	333.50	SR 26 – Lafayette, Hartford City, Portland	
Grant	Marion	211.77	340.81	US 35 / SR 22 – Kokomo, Gas City	
Grant	Marion	214.23	344.77	SR 9 – Marion, Anderson	Northern terminus of the central section of SR 37
Gap in route
Allen	Fort Wayne	214.23	344.77	I-469 / US 24 / US 30 / Maysville Road – Fort Wayne, New Haven	I-469 exit 25; southern terminus of SR 37's northern part
Allen	Springfield Township	230.16	370.41	SR 101 – Woodburn, Butler	
Allen	Scipio Township	234.37	377.18	SR 2 east – Hicksville, Bryan, Toledo	Ohio state line
1.000 mi = 1.609 km; 1.000 km = 0.621 mi: Concurrency terminus; Incomplete access

== Related route ==
State Road 37A
- Allisonville Road
- Location: Indianapolis to Noblesville
- Length: 18.88 mi (30.38 km)
- Existed: 1959–c. 1970s

State Road 37A (SR 37A) ran from Indianapolis to Noblesville from 1959 until the 1970s. Beginning sometime between 1957 and 1959, the designation SR 37A was first used for the old routing of SR 37 between Indianapolis and Noblesville. The southern end of the road was moved to SR 100 in late 1963 or early 1964. In late 1964 or early 1965 the route was shortened at the north end, with the new end being at an intersection with SR 32 and SR 38. In late 1969 or early 1970 the designation of SR 37A in Hamilton County was removed. The state highway commission removed the last segment of SR 37A in Marion County in either late 1972 or early 1973.

SR 37A (Allisonville Road) began at its southern terminus with its parent route, SR 37 (now Binford Boulevard), near the Indiana State Fairgrounds. The route traveled northeast crossing 52nd and 56th streets, Kessler Boulevard East Drive, and 62nd, 65th, 71st, 75th, and 79th streets, before it reached an intersection with East 82nd Street near Castleton Square Mall. The route then interchanged with Interstate 465 (I-465 exit 35), followed by intersections with 86th, 91st, and 96th streets, then crossed into Hamilton County and the town of Fishers.

In Fishers, the route intersected East 106th Street near Indianapolis Metropolitan Airport. The route intersected 116th, 126th, and 131st streets, then passed by Conner Prairie Interactive History Park. The route then crossed 141st and 146th streets, entering the city of Noblesville. Just south of downtown Noblesville, Allisonville Road turned north and becomes South 10th Street. In downtown, the route reached an intersection with SR 32/SR 38 (Conner Street). North of downtown, the route once again turned northeast and became Allisonville Road. The route then intersected East 191st Street. After East 191st Street, the route turned east and crossed Cumberland Road. After Cumberland Road, the route turned southeast and reached its northern terminus at its parent route, SR 37 (Strawtown Pike) on the far north side of Noblesville.

County	Location	mi	km	Destinations	Notes
Marion	Indianapolis	0.0	0.0	SR 37 / Binford Boulevard	Southern terminus of SR 37A (1959–1963)
Marion	Castleton	5.3	8.5	SR 100 / 82nd Street to 86th Street	Southern terminus of SR 37A (1963–1972)
Marion	Castleton	5.6	9.0	I-465	Beltway around Indianapolis
Hamilton	Delaware–Noblesville township line	12.7	20.4	SR 234 west / 146th Street	Eastern terminus of SR 234
Hamilton	Noblesville	15.2	24.5	SR 238 east / Greenfield Avenue	Western terminus of SR 238
Hamilton	Noblesville	15.9	25.6	SR 32 / SR 38 (Conner Street) to SR 19 north	Northern terminus of SR 37A (1964–1972)
Hamilton	Noblesville Township	18.9	30.4	SR 37 (Strawtown Pike)	Northern terminus of SR 37A (1959–1964)
1.000 mi = 1.609 km; 1.000 km = 0.621 mi
