= New Salisbury, Ohio =

Unincorporated community in Ohio, U.S.

Coordinates: 40°35′35″N 80°44′10″W

New Salisbury is an unincorporated community in Columbiana County, in the U.S. state of Ohio.

== History ==
A post office called New Salisbury was established in 1855, and remained in operation until 1910. New Salisbury was located on the Cleveland and Pittsburgh Railroad.
