= Indiana State Road 232 =

State highway in Indiana, United States

State Road 232
- Mounds Road
- SR 232 highlighted in red

Route information
- Maintained by INDOT
- Length: 1.994 mi (3.209 km)

Major junctions
- West end: SR 9 / SR 32 at Anderson
- East end: Mounds State Park

Location
- Country: United States
- State: Indiana

Highway system
- Indiana State Highway System; Interstate; US; State; Scenic
← US 231	→ SR 234

State Road 232 in the U.S. state of Indiana is a short route that connects at the west end with its parent, State Road 32, east of Anderson. It offers access to Mounds State Park.

== Route description ==
The western terminus of SR 232 is at an intersection of SR 32 and State Road 9 in Anderson. SR 232 heads southeast from the intersection. Near the intersection of Rangeline Road, SR 232 turns to the northeast. At the intersection of Donnelly Road, SR 232 turns left heading to Mounds State Park. SR 232 heads northeast until the entrance of Mounds State Park, the entrance is the eastern terminus of SR 232.

== History ==
It is a former routing of State Road 32, before it was routed northward on State Road 9 and then out to the east of the city. SR 32 continued past Mounds State Park moving south of the Anderson Airport into Downtown Chesterfield.

== Major intersections ==
The entire route is in Madison County.

Location	mi	km	Destinations	Notes
Anderson	0.000	0.000	SR 9 / SR 32	Western terminus of SR 232
Union Township	1.994	3.209	Mounds Road – Mounds State Park	Eastern terminus of SR 232
1.000 mi = 1.609 km; 1.000 km = 0.621 mi
