= Advance, Indiana =

- Town
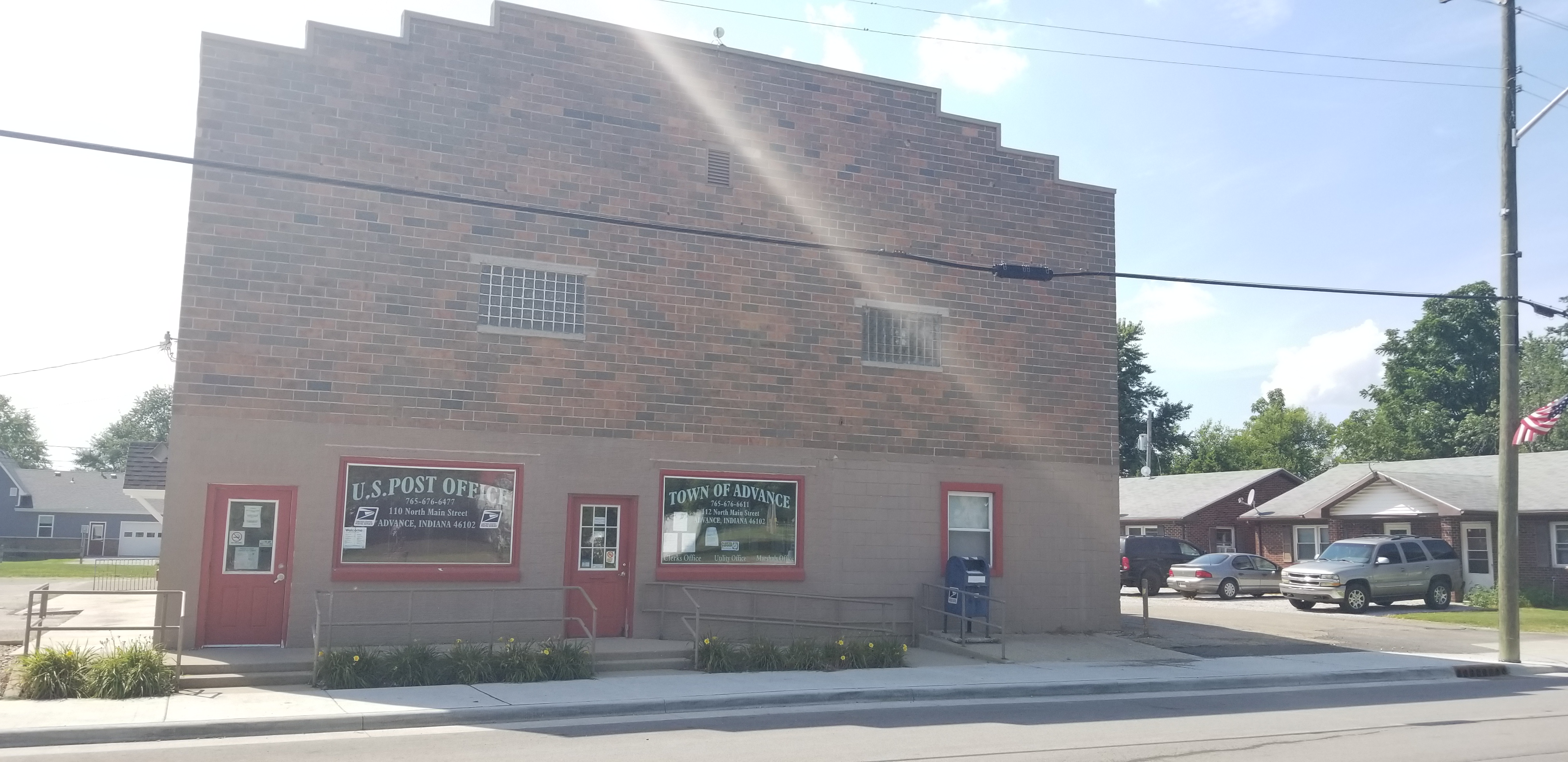
- Post office and Municipal building (202)

- Logo

- Location of Advance in Boone County, Indiana.
- Coordinates: 39°59′51″N 86°37′30″W
- Country: United States
- State: Indiana
- County: Boone
- Township: Jackson
- Settled: 1820s
- Incorporated: 1858
- Platted: 1872

Area
  - Total: 0.59 sq mi (1.53 km^{2})
  - Land: 0.59 sq mi (1.53 km^{2})
  - Water: 0 sq mi (0.00 km^{2})
- Elevation: 929 ft (283 m)

Population (2020)
  - Total: 503
  - Density: 853.8/sq mi (329.66/km^{2})
- Time zone: UTC−5 (EST)
  - Summer (DST): UTC−5 (EST)
- ZIP code: 46102
- Area code: 765
- FIPS code: 18-00640
- GNIS ID: 2397419
- Website: Official website

Advance (AD-vance) is a town in Jackson Township, Boone County, Indiana, United States. The population was 503 at the 2020 census.

== History ==
The first settlers arrived in the 1820s. Advance was officially incorporated in 1858 when residents requested formal recognition as a legal polity by the Indiana General Assembly. The town was platted in 1872 and was originally called "Osceola;" however, there was already a town of that name in the state, and so the name of Advance was chosen "in anticipation of the advancement which the coming of the Midland Railway would bring to the community". One of the few streets in town, Wall Street, was named after Joe Wall whose family owned over 2,000 acres (8.1 km^{2}) surrounding the town until 1971.

On May 13, 1995, a tornado struck the town of Advance, causing $2,000,000 worth of damage. This was part of a series of tornadoes that struck the Midwest.

== Geography ==
According to the 2010 census, Advance has a total area of 0.62 square miles (1.61 km^{2}), all land.

== Demographics ==
Historical population
Census	Pop.	Note	%±
1910	416		—
1920	417		0.2%
1930	358		−14.1%
1940	365		2.0%
1950	413		13.2%
1960	463		12.1%
1970	561		21.2%
1980	559		−0.4%
1990	520		−7.0%
2000	562		8.1%
2010	477		−15.1%
2020	503		5.5%
U.S. Decennial Census

=== 2010 census ===
As of the 2010 United States census, there were 477 people, 161 households, and 121 families living in the town. The population density was 769.4 inhabitants per square mile (297.1/km^{2}). There were 178 housing units at an average density of 287.1 per square mile (110.8/km^{2}). The racial makeup of the town was 97.1% White, 0.4% African American, 0.2% Native American, 0.6% Asian, 0.2% from other races, and 1.5% from two or more races. Hispanic or Latino of any race were 0.8% of the population.

There were 161 households, of which 42.9% had children under the age of 18 living with them, 60.2% were married couples living together, 11.2% had a female householder with no husband present, 3.7% had a male householder with no wife present, and 24.8% were non-families. 19.3% of all households were made up of individuals, and 7.5% had someone living alone who was 65 years of age or older. The average household size was 2.96 and the average family size was 3.39.

The median age in the town was 32.9 years. 32.5% of residents were under the age of 18; 7.2% were between the ages of 18 and 24; 23.1% were from 25 to 44; 27.3% were from 45 to 64; and 9.9% were 65 years of age or older. The gender makeup of the town was 51.8% male and 48.2% female.

=== 2000 census ===
As of the 2000 United States census, there were 562 people, 183 households, and 150 families living in the town. The population density was 898.7 inhabitants per square mile (347.0/km^{2}). There were 190 housing units at an average density of 303.8 per square mile (117.3/km^{2}). The racial makeup of the town was 98.93% White, 0.89% Native American, 0.18% from other races. Hispanic or Latino of any race were 1.25% of the population.

There were 183 households, out of which 45.4% had children under the age of 18 living with them, 68.3% were married couples living together, 7.1% had a female householder with no husband present, and 17.5% were non-families. 13.7% of all households were made up of individuals, and 2.2% had someone living alone who was 65 years of age or older. The average household size was 3.07 and the average family size was 3.40.

In the town, the population was spread out, with 33.5% under the age of 18, 6.9% from 18 to 24, 32.6% from 25 to 44, 20.1% from 45 to 64, and 6.9% who were 65 years of age or older. The median age was 32 years. For every 100 females, there were 93.8 males. For every 100 females age 18 and over, there were 95.8 males.

The median income for a household in the town was $45,000, and the median income for a family was $50,972. Males had a median income of $35,313 versus $21,500 for females. The per capita income for the town was $17,169. About 4.2% of families and 6.9% of the population were below the poverty line, including 7.8% of those under age 18 and 4.1% of those age 65 or over.

== Education ==
It is in the Western Boone County Community School Corporation.
