= Indiana State Road 662 =

Highway in Indiana

State Road 662
- SR 662 highlighted in red

Route information
- Maintained by INDOT
- Length: 1.557 mi (2.506 km)

Major junctions
- West end: I-69 in Evansville
- East end: Ellerbusch Road in Newburgh

Location
- Country: United States
- State: Indiana
- Counties: Warrick

Highway system
- Indiana State Highway System; Interstate; US; State; Scenic
← SR 650	→ SR 727

State Road 662 (SR 662) is a short east–west route that runs from Evansville toward Newburgh.

== Route description ==
The western terminus of SR 662 begins at an interchange with Interstate 69 (I-69). From its beginning point, SR 662 heads southeast toward Newburgh. The route is a four-lane surface street that has a mix of commercial, business and residential traffic.

== History ==
Formerly a 4-mile (6.4 km) route that passed through Newburgh, SR 662 connected State Road 66 east of Newburgh with I-69 east of Evansville. In recent years, however, the highway was decommissioned through Newburgh proper, and now has a routing of slightly more than a mile from what is now I-69 to Ellerbusch Road on the west side of the town.

== Major intersections ==
The entire route is in Ohio Township, Warrick County.

mi	km	Destinations	Notes
0.000	0.000	I-69 to I-64 – Evansville, Indianapolis	Western terminus of SR 662
1.557	2.506	Ellerbusch Road – Newburgh	Eastern terminus of SR 662
1.000 mi = 1.609 km; 1.000 km = 0.621 mi
