= New Boston, Harrison County, Indiana =

Unincorporated community in Indiana, United States

Coordinates: 37.99980°N 86.01080°W

New Boston is an unincorporated community in Harrison County, Indiana, in the United States.

The community was likely named after Boston, Lincolnshire or Boston, Massachusetts.
