= New Salisbury, Indiana =

- Census-designated place
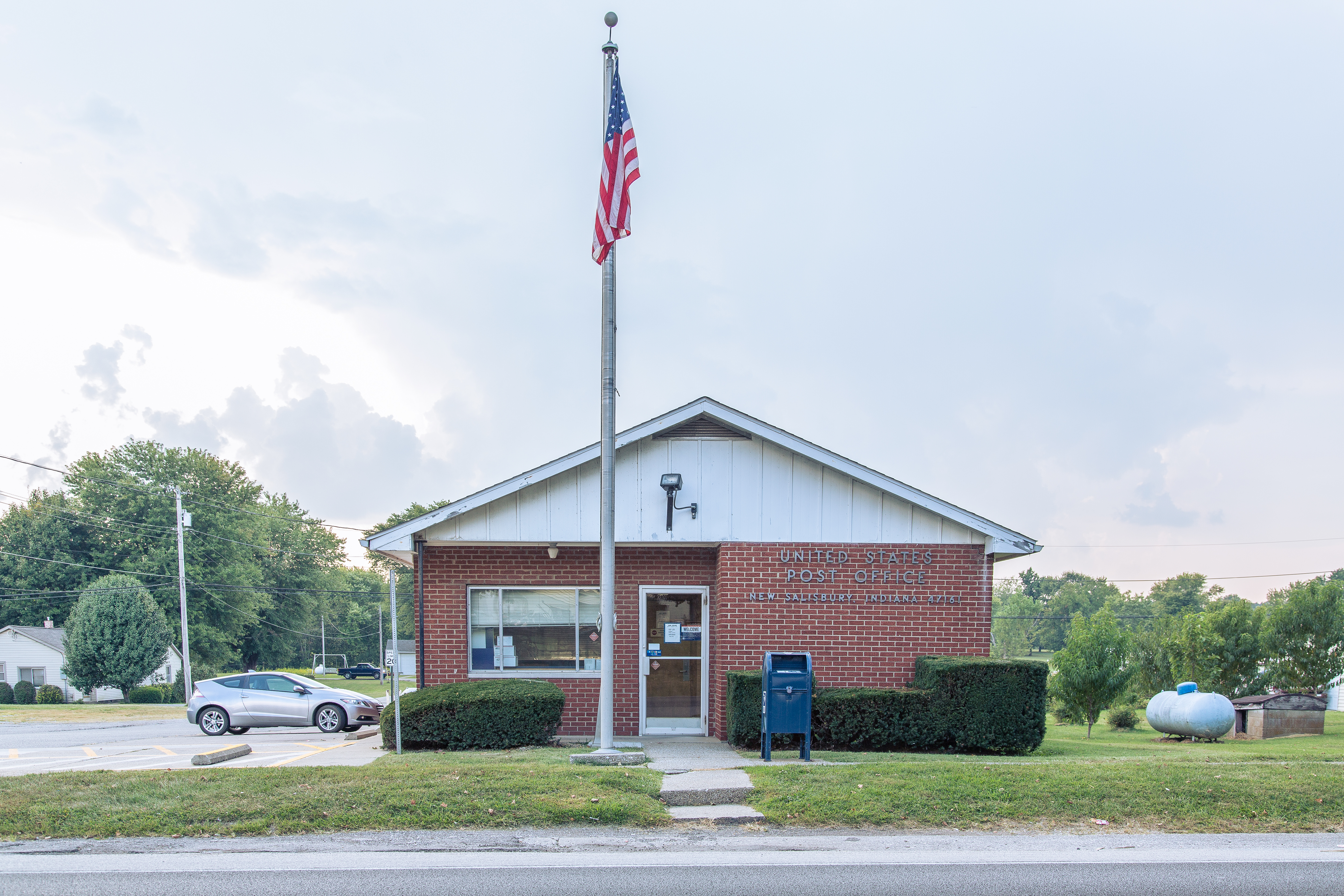

- Location of New Salisbury in Harrison County, Indiana.
- Coordinates: 38°18′50″N 86°06′00″W
- Country: United States
- State: Indiana
- County: Harrison
- Township: Jackson

Area
  - Total: 1.98 sq mi (5.12 km^{2})
  - Land: 1.98 sq mi (5.12 km^{2})
  - Water: 0 sq mi (0.00 km^{2})
- Elevation: 719 ft (219 m)

Population (2020)
  - Total: 550
  - Density: 278/sq mi (107.4/km^{2})
- Time zone: EDT
- ZIP code: 47161
- GNIS feature ID: 2629883
- FIPS code: 18-53586

New Salisbury is an unincorporated census-designated place (CDP) in Jackson Township, Harrison County, Indiana, United States. As of the 2020 census, New Salisbury had a population of 550. The community is centered on the intersection of State Highway 135 and State Highway 64, about 7 miles (11 km) away from Corydon, the county seat.

Businesses in New Salisbury include two gas stations, two grocery stores, a drug store, a bank, a veterinarian's office, doctor offices, a transport company, and a manufacturing company. The area is within the North Harrison Community School Corporation.

== History ==
New Salisbury was platted in 1839 by John Kepley. It was named for Kepley's former hometown of Salisbury, North Carolina.

The town was sacked during Morgan's Raid by the main body of the Confederate Army as it advanced north toward Palmyra where it camped the night of July 9, 1863.

== Demographics ==
Historical population
Census	Pop.	Note	%±
2020	550		—
U.S. Decennial Census
