= Keystone, Indiana =

- Unincorporated community and Census-designated place
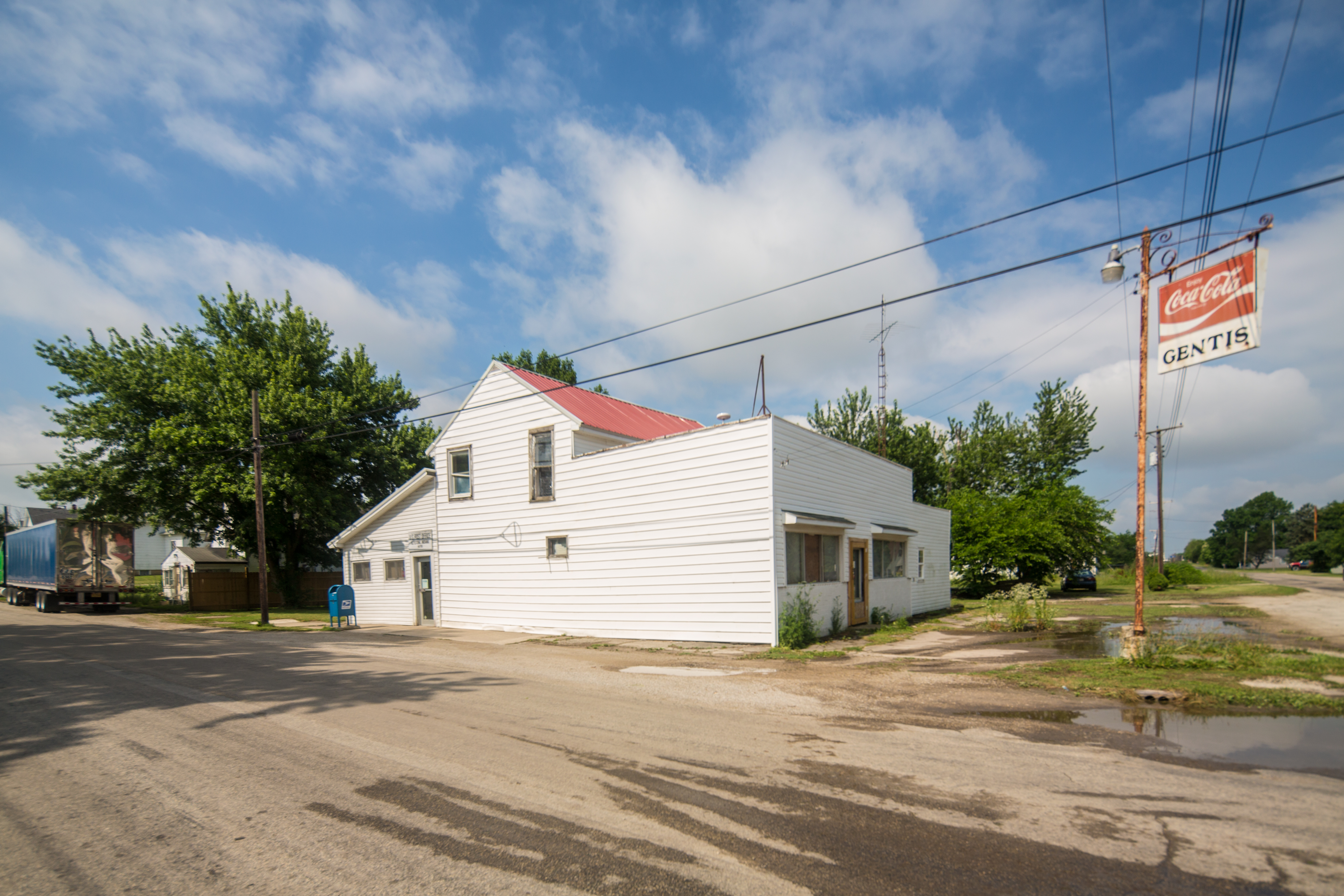
- Post office in Keystone, Indiana

- Wells County's location in Indiana

- Location of Keystone in Wells County
- Coordinates: 40°35′37″N 85°15′37″W
- Country: United States
- State: Indiana
- County: Wells
- Township: Chester
- Elevation: 866 ft (264 m)
- Time zone: UTC-5 (Eastern (EST))
  - Summer (DST): UTC-4 (EDT)
- ZIP code: 46759
- FIPS code: 18-39654
- GNIS feature ID: 2830580

Keystone is an unincorporated community in Chester Township, Wells County, in the U.S. state of Indiana.

== History ==
A large share of the early settlers being natives of Pennsylvania caused the name of Keystone to be selected, after the Keystone State.

The post office at Keystone has been in operation since 1871.

== Demographics ==
The United States Census Bureau delineated Keystone as a census designated place in the 2022 American Community Survey.
