= Benton, Indiana =

- Unincorporated community and Census designated place
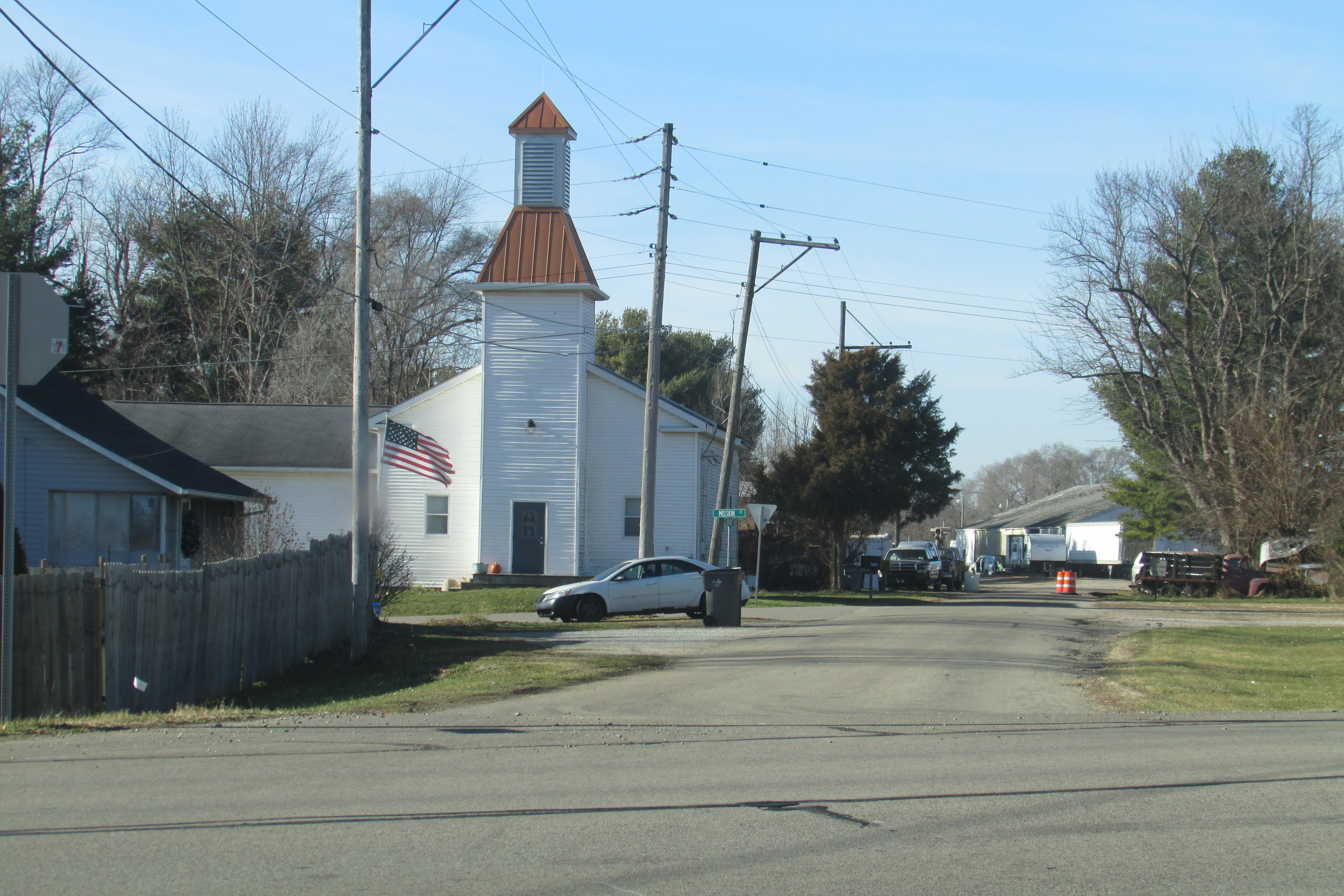
- historic Benton Methodist Church

- Location within Indiana Location within the United States
- Coordinates: 41°30′37″N 85°45′54″W
- Country: United States
- State: Indiana
- County: Elkhart
- Township: Benton
- Elevation: 833 ft (254 m)
- ZIP code: 46526 & 46528
- FIPS code: 18-04780
- GNIS feature ID: 2830367

Benton is an unincorporated community in Benton Township, Elkhart County, Indiana.

== History ==
Benton was platted in 1832. It was named in honor of politician Thomas Hart Benton.

The railroad was built through Benton in 1892. A post office was established at Benton in 1835, and remained in operation until it was discontinued in 1963.

== Demographics ==
The United States Census Bureau delineated Benton as a census designated place in the 2022 American Community Survey.
