= Youngstown, Indiana =

- Unincorporated community
- Vigo County's location in Indiana

- location in Vigo County, Indiana
- Coordinates: 39°21′44″N 87°22′56″W
- Country: United States
- State: Indiana
- County: Vigo
- Township: Honey Creek
- Elevation: 590 ft (180 m)
- Time zone: UTC-5 (Eastern (EST))
  - Summer (DST): UTC-4 (EDT)
- ZIP code: 47802
- Area codes: 812, 930
- GNIS feature ID: 446419

Youngstown is an unincorporated community in southern Honey Creek Township, Vigo County, in the U.S. state of Indiana.

It is part of the Terre Haute metropolitan area.

== History ==
Youngstown was subdivided and made a village on March 31, 1868, by Chauncey R. Carr. It was a station on the Evansville & Terre Haute Rail Road, about seven miles south of Terre Haute. George Planett built the first business house in 1868, when he was made the first postmaster. The post office ran until it was discontinued in 1912. In 1890 the population was approximately 39.

== Geography ==
Youngstown is located at 39°21′44″N 87°22′56″W at an elevation of 591 feet.
