= Bennettsville, Indiana =

Unincorporated community in Indiana, United States

Bennettsville
- Unincorporated community
- Clark County's location in Indiana

- Location in Clark County
- Coordinates: 38°25′32″N 85°48′31″W
- Country: United States
- State: Indiana
- County: Clark
- Township: Carr
- Elevation: 574 ft (175 m)
- ZIP code: 47172
- FIPS code: 18-04744
- GNIS feature ID: 430818

Bennettsville is an unincorporated community in Carr Township, Clark County, Indiana.

== History ==
Bennettsville was laid out in 1838. It was likely named for Benedict Nugent, a local businessman. A post office was established at Bennettsville in 1847, and remained in operation until it was discontinued in 1924.
