= Eckerty, Indiana =

Eckerty
- Census-designated place
- Location within Crawford County, Indiana
- Coordinates: 38°19′19″N 86°36′44″W
- Country: United States
- State: Indiana
- County: Crawford
- Township: Johnson
- Elevation: 745 ft (227 m)
- ZIP code: 47116
- FIPS code: 18-20134
- GNIS feature ID: 2830346

Eckerty is an unincorporated community and census-designated place in Johnson Township, Crawford County, Indiana.

== History ==
Eckerty was laid out in 1873 by Christopher Eckerty.

== Demographics ==
The United States Census Bureau first delineated Eckerty as a census designated place in the 2022 American Community Survey.
