= U.S. Route 12 in Indiana =

Section of U.S. Highway in Indiana

U.S. Route 12
- Iron Brigade Memorial Highway
- US 12 highlighted in red

Route information
- Maintained by INDOT
- Length: 46.258 mi (74.445 km)
- Existed: November 11, 1926–present
- Tourist routes: Lake Michigan Circle Tour

Major junctions
- West end: US 12 / US 20 / US 41 at the Illinois state line in Whiting
- I-65 / I-90 / Indiana Toll Road in Gary
- East end: US 12 at the Michigan state line in Michiana Shores

Location
- Country: United States
- State: Indiana
- Counties: Lake, Porter, LaPorte

Highway system
- United States Numbered Highway System; List; Special; Divided; Indiana State Highway System; Interstate; US; State; Scenic
← SR 11	→ SR 13

U.S. Route 12 (US 12) is a part of the United States Numbered Highway System that runs from Aberdeen, Washington, to Detroit, Michigan. In the U.S. state of Indiana, it is part of the state road system. US 12 enters the state concurrent with US 20 and US 41 in Hammond. The 46.258 miles (74.445 km) of US 12 that lie within Indiana serve as a major conduit. Some of the highway is listed on the National Highway System (NHS). Various sections are rural two-lane highway, urbanized four-lane undivided highway, and one-way streets. The easternmost community along the highway is Michiana Shores at the Michigan state line.

US 12 passes through urban areas and wood lands, parallel to the Lake Michigan shoreline. The highway is included in the Lake Michigan Circle Tour and passes through Indiana Dunes National Park. Historical landmarks along the highway include the Miller Town Hall, Beverly Shores station, and the Old Michigan City Light. A memorial highway designations have been applied to the route since 1917, named for the Civil War Union Army unit.

US 12 was first designated as a U.S. Highway in 1926, concurrent with US 20 west of Michigan City. A section of the highway originally served as part of the Dunes Highway, a connection between Gary and Michigan. US 12 replaced the original State Road 43 (SR 43) designation of the highway which dated back to the formation of the Indiana state road system. SR 43 ran from the Illinois state line through Gary to Michigan City and ended at the Michigan state line. In the early 1920s, it was the most important route between Chicago and Detroit and in 1922 the first sections started being paved. The Indiana State Highway Commission, later renamed Indiana Department of Transportation (INDOT), removed US 20 from the section east of Gary in the early 1930s. Most of the route has since been supplanted by Interstate 94 (I-94) and the Indiana Toll Road.

== Route description ==
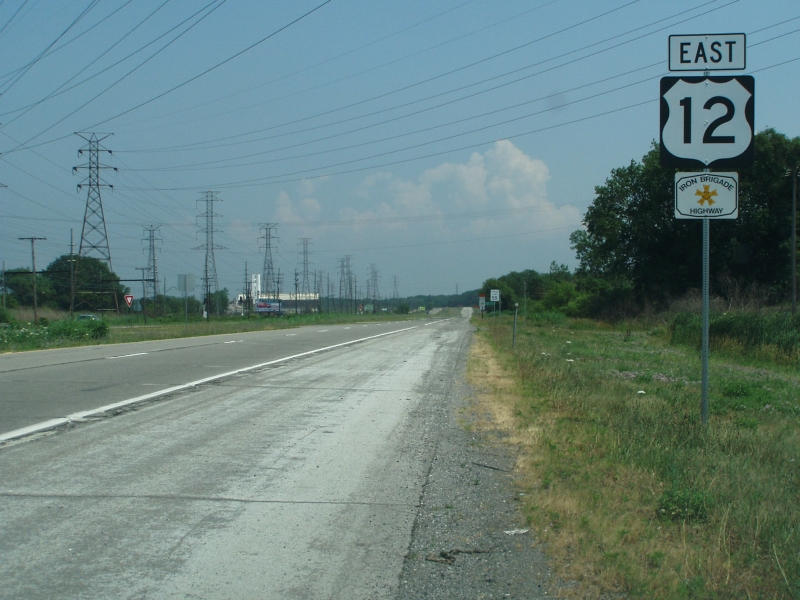
Burns Harbor section near intersection with SR 149

Only one segment of US 12 is included in the NHS. That is the segment that is concurrent with US 20 from the Illinois state line to the split with US 20 in East Chicago. The NHS is a network of highways that are identified as being most important for the economy, mobility, and defense of the nation. The highway is maintained by INDOT like all other U.S. Highways in the state. The department tracks the traffic volumes along all state highways as a part of its maintenance responsibilities using a metric called annual average daily traffic (AADT). This measurement is a calculation of the traffic level along a segment of roadway for any average day of the year. In 2010, INDOT figured that the lowest traffic levels were 3,120 vehicles and 350 commercial vehicles used the highway daily near Ogden Dunes. The peak traffic volumes were 30,510 vehicles and 2,430 commercial vehicles AADT along the section of US 12 at the Illinois state line, concurrent with US 20 and US 41. The highway has been designated as the Iron Brigade Memorial Highway to honor the Civil War Union Army unit; it has the same designation in Michigan, Wisconsin, and Illinois.

=== Hammond to Gary ===
US 12/US 20 westbound at Bridge Street, along which both routes travel south to 5th Avenue

US 12 enters Indiana concurrent with US 20 and US 41, at which point it passes under the Indiana Toll Road. The road passes both commercial and industrial areas between Wolf Lake and Horseshoe Hammond. US 12, US 20, and US 41 are concurrent until US 41 turns south on Calumet Avenue. Both US 12 and US 20 head southeast toward East Chicago, where US 12 turns east while US 20 continues south. The route heads east through East Chicago as a four-lane undivided highway passing through mostly residential areas. The road heads south concurrent with SR 912, passing through mainly industrial area between East Chicago and Gary. The two routes have an interchange at SR 312 and access to the Indiana Toll Road, via an interchange at Gary Avenue. The road has two bridges with the first passes over the Grand Calumet River and the other passing over the Indiana Toll Road and the South Shore Line.

After passing the rail line, the road has an interchange with US 20, this interchange is the southern end of the SR 912 concurrency. US 12 follows US 20 east toward Downtown Gary, as a four-lane divided highway. The two highways pass through residential areas and crosses the Lake Shore and Michigan Southern Railway owned by Norfolk Southern Railway, before Downtown Gary. At Bridge Street in Gary, the road becomes one-way streets, with westbound on Fourth Avenue and eastbound on Fifth Avenue. In Downtown Gary it has an intersection with SR 53, locally known as Broadway. The streets also pass by the historical Knights of Columbus Building and the old Ralph Waldo Emerson School building. East of Downtown Gary, the road passes by U.S. Steel Yard, the home of the Gary SouthShore RailCats, an independent professional baseball team. The one-way streets end and the road becomes a six-lane divided highway, known as Dunes Highway. The Dunes Highway passes between the South Shore commuter rail line and residential houses. East of Gary the route has a signalized intersection with the northern terminus of I-65.

=== Gary to Michiana Shores ===
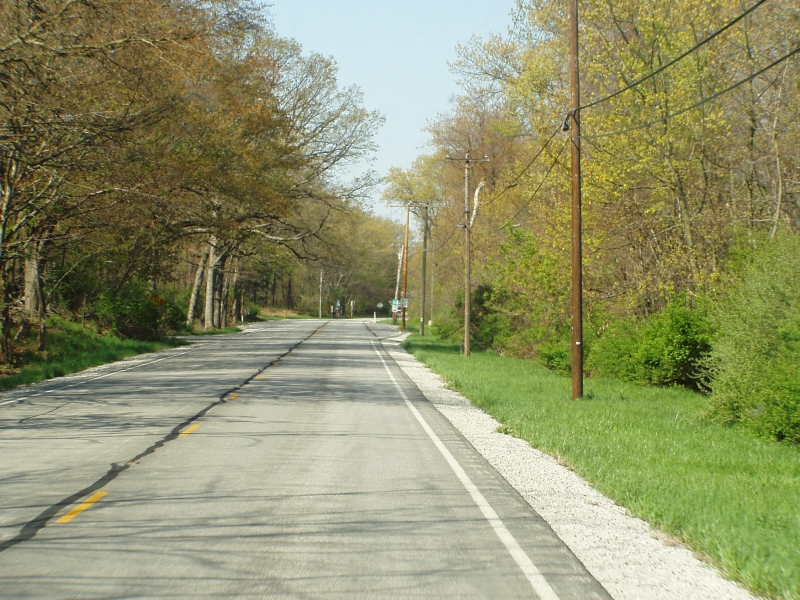
US 12 (Dunes Highway), westbound in the Dune Park section

After I-65, the road has a trumpet interchange with I-90. In the far eastern portion of Gary, US 12 and US 20 split for the final time, although US 20 closely parallels US 12 for the next 20 miles (32 km), sometimes coming within 0.2 miles (0.32 km). US 20 follows a slightly more southerly route to Michigan City (via Portage and Porter), while US 12 passes through Indiana Dunes National Park and retains the name "Dunes Highway". After splitting from US 20, US 12 becomes a mostly rural two-lane highway, passing through the woodland.

The road passes just south of the historical Miller Town Hall, in the community of Miller Beach. After the community of Miller Beach, the highway enters Indiana Dunes National Park. The road passes through woodland and parallel to the South Shore tracks, before leaving the national park west of Ogden Dunes. In Ogden Dunes, the highway becomes a four-lane divided highway, passing through woodland with some houses. After Ogden Dunes, the road has a folded diamond interchange with the north terminus of SR 249 and George Nalson Drive, which heads into the industrial complex at Burns Harbor. The industrial complex at Burns Harbor includes a NIPSCO powerplant and a steel mill. After SR 249, the route has an intersection with SR 149 and a folded diamond interchange at an access road into Burns Harbor. After this interchange, the highway narrows to a two-lane highway again.

The highway is near, but not on or within sight of, the shoreline of Lake Michigan. The route reenters Indiana Dunes National Park at a traffic light for the eastern entrance of Mittal Steel Company. After the traffic light the road passes south of Dune Acres and enters Indiana Dunes State Park. The road has an intersection with SR 49, with access to the lake front. After the intersection, the road passes under the access road to the lake front. The highway leaves the dunes and enters Beverly Shores. In Beverly Shores at the intersection of US 12 and Broadway is Beverly Shores station. After leaving Beverly Shores, the route enters Town of Pines and has an all-way stop at the northern terminus of SR 520. SR 520 is the final connecting route to US 20 before the two separate regionally.

After Town of Pines, the road curves due north back into the dunes and crossing the South Shore Line tracks. The route curves northeast and becomes a four-lane undivided highway, before leaving the dunes. After the dunes the route crosses the Michigan Line, owned by Amtrak. The Michigan Line is used by Amtrak's Wolverine train. The route makes a few more curves before entering downtown Michigan City and passing through a mix of industrial and commercial areas. In downtown Michigan City, the route becomes a four-lane divided highway and passes south of the Old Michigan City Light but just north of the Lighthouse Place Premium Outlets. Before exiting Michigan City, the road narrows to a four-lane undivided highway and intersects SR 212, an eastern bypass of Michigan City. After SR 212 the route leaves Michigan City and passes through Long Beach. The highway leaves Long Beach, traveling through woodlands with houses and the town of Michiana Shores, before entering Michigan.

== History ==
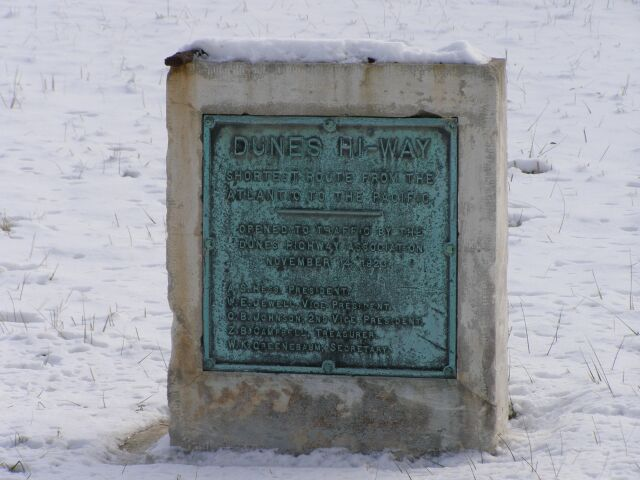
Dunes Highway Historic marker at US 12 and SR 49

The Old Chicago Road was an important road from 1900 to 1910; it was later renamed the Dunes Highway. The Dunes Highway Association engineers envisioned the Dunes Highway a "state of the art" 40-foot-wide (12 m) concrete highway with a 100-foot (30 m) right-of-way. In August 1919, commission director H.L. Wright tentatively designated the Dunes Highway as SR 43, to be 20 feet (6.1 m) wide. Narrower than anticipated, the new concrete highway was still superior to most Indiana roads, which in the mid-1920s were gravel or dirt with paved sections only between the larger towns. Dunes Highway construction began in 1922 under the guidance of Gary contractor Ingwald Moe and construction engineer Ezra Sensibar.

The designation was changed to US 12 and US 20 in 1926 when the U.S. Numbered Highway System was created. The two routes were concurrent from Illinois to Michigan City, with the rest in Indiana as only being US 12. In 1930, US 20 was moved to a new alignment south of US 12. This left US 12 on its current alignment without US 20. The route did not change between 1931 and 2002, with only work being maintenance. Then in 2003, the state of Indiana rerouted US 12 onto SR 912 from Columbus Drive to US 20. The route was changed to make room for the Gary/Chicago International Airport runway expansion project.

== Major intersections ==
County	Location	mi	km	Exit	Destinations	Notes
Lake	Hammond	0.000	0.000		US 12 west / US 20 west / US 41 north / LMCT (Indianapolis Boulevard) – Chicago	Continuation into Illinois
Lake	Hammond	0.057– 0.364	0.092– 0.586		I-90 Toll east / Indiana Toll Road east to I-80 / I-94	Exit 0 on I-90 / Toll Road
Lake	Hammond	1.314	2.115		US 41 south – Hammond	Eastern end of US 41 concurrency
Lake	East Chicago	4.356	7.010		Riley Road	To SR 912
Lake	East Chicago	5.107	8.219		US 20 east (Indianapolis Boulevard south)	Eastern end of US 20 concurrency
Lake	East Chicago–Gary line	7.965	12.818		SR 912 / Airport Road	Western end of SR 912 concurrency; SR 912 exit 6A; access to Gary Chicago International Airport
Lake	Gary	8.169	13.147	7A	SR 312 west / Chicago Avenue	Exit numbers follow SR 912; no westbound entrance; eastbound access via Cline Avenue frontage road; eastern terminus of SR 312
Lake	Gary	8.181	13.166	7B	To I-90 Toll (Indiana Toll Road) / Gary Avenue	Signed as exit 7 westbound; exit 10 on I-90 / Toll Road
Lake	Gary–Hammond line	9.912	15.952	8	US 20 west (Michigan Street west) SR 912 south (Cline Avenue south)	Interchange; US 12 departs via exit ramps; US 20 continues west and SR 912 continues south; eastern end of SR 912 concurrency; western end of US 20 concurrency; no exit number westbound
Lake	Gary	14.878	23.944		SR 53 south (Broadway) – Merrillville	
Lake	Gary				I-65 south – Indianapolis	At-grade intersection; northern terminus of I-65
Lake	Gary	16.517– 16.533	26.582– 26.607		I-90 Toll / Indiana Toll Road to I-80 / I-94 east	Exit 17 on I-90 / Toll Road
Lake	Gary	17.809	28.661		US 20 east (Melton Road) – Michigan City, South Bend	Eastern end of US 20 concurrency
Porter	Portage	23.769	38.252		SR 249 south / Midwest Steel Highway	Interchange; entrance only from northbound Midwest Highway and exit to SR 249 South from eastbound US 12 only
Porter	Portage	22.684	36.506		SR 249 south to I-94 / Port of Indiana	Folded diamond interchange; northern terminus of SR 249
Porter	Burns Harbor	26.196	42.158		SR 149 south (Max Mochal Highway) – Portage	Northern terminus of SR 149
Porter	Burns Harbor	26.480	42.615		Cleveland-Cliffs – Burns Harbor	Folded diamond interchange; private entrance to steel plant
Porter	Porter	30.013	48.301		SR 49 – Indiana Dunes State Park, Valparaiso	
Porter	Town of Pines	36.004	57.943		SR 520 south (Maple Street) to US 20	Northern terminus of SR 520
La Porte	Michigan City	44.360– 44.626	71.390– 71.819		SR 212 south to US 20	Northern terminus of SR 212
La Porte	Michiana Shores	46.258	74.445		US 12 east / LMCT – New Buffalo	Continuation into Michigan
1.000 mi = 1.609 km; 1.000 km = 0.621 mi: Concurrency terminus; Incomplete access; Tolled

== See also ==
U.S. Route 12
Previous state: Illinois	Indiana	Next state: Michigan
