= Indiana State Road 130 =

Highway in Indiana

State Road 130
- SR 130 highlighted in red

Route information
- Maintained by INDOT
- Length: 7.872 mi (12.669 km)

Major junctions
- West end: US 6 / US 6 Bus. / SR 51 in Hobart
- East end: SR 149 near Valparaiso

Location
- Country: United States
- State: Indiana
- Counties: Lake, Porter

Highway system
- Indiana State Highway System; Interstate; US; State; Scenic
← SR 129	→ US 131

State Road 130 in the U.S. state of Indiana is a short, 7.87-mile (12.67 km) road that connects Lake Station with Valparaiso to the southeast.

== Route description ==
State Road 130 runs 7.9 miles (17.9 km) from State Road 149 near Valparaiso to U.S. Route 6 and State Road 51 in Hobart. This highway mainly follows a major rail line for its entire length. It formerly followed Lincoln Way (sometimes spelled "Lincolnway") for its entire length in Valparaiso, except south of LaPorte Avenue, where it was called Sturdy Road.

State Road 130 passes through the following cities, and intersects with highways at those locations:

- Hobart — U.S. Route 6/State Road 51
- Valparaiso — State Road 149

State Road 130 is concurrent with SR 51 for one mile (1.6 km) south of its terminus on U.S. Route 6. State Road 51 then goes west into downtown Hobart, and State Road 130 goes southeast towards Porter County and Valparaiso.

State Road 130 can be considered a local spur of US 30. This differs from other highways, such as State Road 249, which exist outside of the grid system and are numbered according to the nearest grid number available.

== History ==
State Road 130 south of LaPorte Avenue was at one point concurrent with State Road 2. When the Valparaiso Bypass (current State Road 49) was completed, State Road 49 was routed onto the bypass, and State Road 2 was routed with State Road 49 south to U.S. Route 30.

In 2015, State Road 130 was truncated at its intersection with State Road 149, and its remaining length was transferred to Porter County and Valparaiso.

== Major intersections ==
County	Location	mi	km	Destinations	Notes
Lake	Hobart	0.000	0.000	US 6 / SR 51 north	Western terminus of SR 130; northern end of SR 51 concurrency
Lake	Hobart	1.008	1.622	SR 51 south	Southern end of SR 51 concurrency
Porter	Union Township	7.872	12.669	SR 149 north	Eastern terminus of SR 130
1.000 mi = 1.609 km; 1.000 km = 0.621 mi: Concurrency terminus
