= Indiana State Road 212 =

Highway in Indiana

State Road 212
- SR 212 highlighted in red

Route information
- Maintained by INDOT
- Length: 3.223 mi (5.187 km)
- Existed: 1930–present

Major junctions
- South end: US 20 in Michigan City
- North end: US 12 in Michiana Shores

Location
- Country: United States
- State: Indiana

Highway system
- Indiana State Highway System; Interstate; US; State; Scenic
← SR 211	→ SR 213

State Road 212 (SR 212) is a north–south highway in LaPorte County in the U.S. state of Indiana, that runs between U.S. Highway 20 (US 20) and US 12. It is entirely an undivided four-lane surface road that passes east of Michigan City. The road provides access to the Michigan City Municipal Airport. The construction on SR 212 began in 1930, with the roadway opening in 1932.

== Route description ==
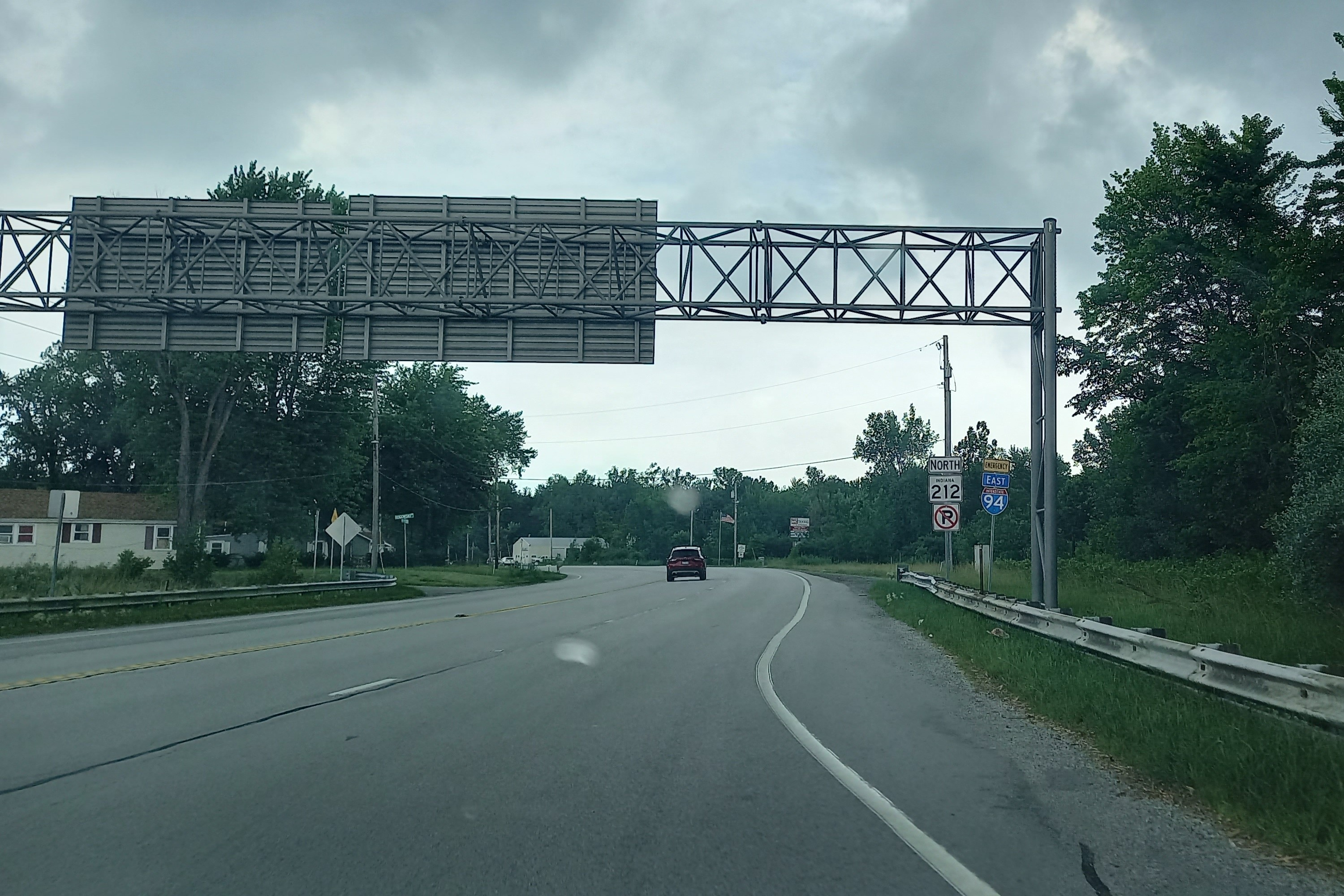
Northbound SR 212 at its southern terminus

SR 212 begins at an interchange with US 20, on the east side of Michigan City, as a four-lane undivided roadway. It heads north passing west of Michigan City Municipal Airport while passing through woodland with some houses. The road bridges over the South Shore Line and has an at grade crossing with another railroad track, before passing through a mixture of woodland and industrial properties. The road ends at an intersection with US 12, in the northeast area of Michigan City. In 2016, traffic surveys from the Indiana Department of Transportation (INDOT) showed that on average, 15,912 vehicles used the highway daily near the southern end and 6,669 vehicles did so each day near the northern end, the highest and lowest counts along the highway, respectively.

== History ==
Construction on SR 212 began in 1930, routed between US 20 and US 12 along its modern route. The road opens in 1932 along its modern route. On August 10, 2007, officials of the INDOT abruptly closed the bridge on SR 212 which crosses the tracks of the South Shore Line, effectively closing the road as a bypass. The closure followed a routine inspection which found severe corrosion, resulting in the bridge receiving a lower rating than the I-35W Mississippi River bridge which collapsed on August 1, 2007. Removal of the old bridge was and construction of a new bridge began during February 2008. The construction of the new bridge was completed and the roadway reopened to traffic on June 12, 2008.

== Major intersections ==
The entire route is in LaPorte County.

Location	mi	km	Destinations	Notes
Michigan City	0.000– 0.121	0.000– 0.195	US 20 to US 35 / I-94 – Michigan City, South Bend, La Porte	Southern terminus of SR 212
Michiana Shores	3.223– 3.325	5.187– 5.351	US 12 / LMCT	Northern terminus of SR 212
1.000 mi = 1.609 km; 1.000 km = 0.621 mi
