= Indiana State Road 106 =

State highway in Indiana, United States

State Road 106
- SR 106 highlighted in red

Route information
- Maintained by INDOT
- Length: 4.305 mi (6.928 km)
- Existed: 1985–present

Major junctions
- West end: US 6 west of Bremen
- SR 331 in Bremen
- East end: US 6 east of Bremen

Location
- Country: United States
- State: Indiana
- Counties: Marshall

Highway system
- Indiana State Highway System; Interstate; US; State; Scenic
← SR 105	→ SR 109

State Road 106 (SR 106) is part of the Indiana State Road system that runs through Bremen in US state of Indiana. The 4.33 miles (6.97 km) of SR 106 that lie within the state serves as a business route for U.S. Route 6 (US 6). None of the highway is listed on the National Highway System. The road is all two-lanes and it passes through farmland, residential and commercial properties. SR 106 was first designated as a state road in the 1980s. The highway replaced US 6 designation of the highway which dated back to the 1930s.

== Route description ==
SR 106 heads east from its western terminus at US 6 west of Bremen. The highway passes through rural farmland as a two-lane highway. At Miami Trail the roadway turns southeast, before turning northeast at Plymouth Goshen Trail. East of Plymouth Goshen Trail, SR 106 becomes concurrent with Plymouth Street. The highway enters Bremen at Industrial Drive, passing through commercial properties. Between Hope Boulevard and Birkey Street, Plymouth Street curves due east and enters downtown Bremen. In downtown Bremen the street has a traffic light at the western end of the SR 331 concurrency. The concurrency heads east leaving downtown Bremen and passing through residential properties, on the east side of Bremen. SR 106 leaves SR 331 heading north, concurrent with Douglas Road. The road enters commercial properties and passes under the CSX Railroad tracks. After the railroad tracks the highway curves northeast towards US 6. The highway leaves Bremen and enters rural farmland, before its eastern terminus at an intersection with US 6.

No part of SR 106 is included as a part of the National Highway System (NHS). The NHS is a network of highways that are identified as being most important for the economy, mobility and defense of the nation. The highway is maintained by the Indiana Department of Transportation (INDOT) like all other State Roads in the state. The department tracks the traffic volumes along all state highways as a part of its maintenance responsibilities using a metric called average annual daily traffic (AADT). This measurement is a calculation of the traffic level along a segment of roadway for any average day of the year. In 2010, INDOT figured that lowest traffic levels were the 2,190 vehicles and 230 commercial vehicles used the highway daily between the western terminus at US 6 and Plymouth Goshen Trail. The peak traffic volumes were 8,670 vehicles and 590 commercial vehicles AADT along the section of SR 106 that is between Liberty Drive and Bowen Avenue (SR 331 north).

== History ==
In 1932, US 6 was under construction through the town of Bremen, on what later became SR 106. By 1989, US 6 was moved onto a bypass of Bremen passing around the north and west side of town. The route that US 6 took through town became SR 106.

== Major intersections ==
The entire route is in Marshall County.

Location	mi	km	Destinations	Notes
German Township	0.000	0.000	US 6	Western terminus of SR 106
Bremen	2.687	4.324	SR 331 north / Bowen Avenue	Western end of SR 331 concurrency
Bremen	3.585	5.769	SR 331 south	Eastern end of SR 331 concurrency
German Township	4.305	6.928	US 6	Eastern terminus of SR 106
1.000 mi = 1.609 km; 1.000 km = 0.621 mi: Concurrency terminus
