= Indiana State Road 51 =

Highway in Indiana

State Road 51
- Adam Benjamin Highway
- SR 51 highlighted in red

Route information
- Maintained by INDOT
- Length: 9.557 mi (15.381 km)

Major junctions
- South end: US 30 east of Merrillville
- US 6 in Hobart; I-80 / I-94 / US 6 in Lake Station
- North end: US 20 in Gary

Location
- Country: United States
- State: Indiana
- Counties: Lake

Highway system
- Indiana State Highway System; Interstate; US; State; Scenic
← US 50	→ US 52

State Road 51 in the U.S. state of Indiana is a north–south route on the state highway system in northwest Indiana. It consists of a route 9.56 miles (15.39 km) long from a point on U.S. Route 30 (Lincoln Highway) 4 miles (6.4 km) east of Merrillville and 8 miles (13 km) west of Valparaiso, north to U.S. Route 20 in Gary. Immediately north of US 30, the highway is signed as the Adam Benjamin Highway.

== Route description ==
SR 51 travels north on Lake Park Avenue from US 30, crossing Old Lincoln Highway and the mainline of the Canadian National Railway in the former town of Ainsworth before turning east on 10th Street in Hobart. Turning north on Lincoln Street, SR 51 merges into Main Street before turning east again on 3rd Street in the downtown business district. The highway follows 3rd Street to its end, turning north on Illinois Street and crossing the Chicago, Fort Wayne and Eastern Railroad's former Conrail line before turning east on Lillian Street. Heading north on Indiana Street, SR 51 turns east on Cleveland Avenue, leading to the beginning of concurrency with SR 130. Following SR 130 north, SR 51 reaches US 6. At this point, SR 130 ends and US 6 turns north to run in concurrency with SR 51 to the junction with Interstate 80/Interstate 94 in Lake Station. The concurrency with US 6 ends here and SR 51 continues north a short distance to its northern terminus at US 20.

No segment of State Road 51 in Indiana is included in the National Highway System (NHS). The NHS is a network of highways that are identified as being most important for the economy, mobility and defense of the nation. The highway is maintained by the Indiana Department of Transportation (INDOT) like all other state roads in the state. The department tracks the traffic volumes along all state roads as a part of its maintenance responsibilities using a metric called average annual daily traffic (AADT). This measurement is a calculation of the traffic level along a segment of roadway for any average day of the year. In 2010, INDOT figured that lowest traffic levels were 6,630 vehicles and 136 commercial vehicles used the highway daily between Main Street and Cleveland Avenue, in Hobart. The peak traffic volumes were 28,916 vehicles and 1,112 commercial vehicles AADT along the section of SR 51 between I–80/I–94 and Old Hobart Road.

== History ==
Between 1918 and 1926, SR 51 went from SR 2 in Elkhart to the Michigan state line, now the route is State Road 19. In 1926, SR 51 was removed from that section of roadway and it was signed as US 112.

There were plans to build SR 51 from State Road 10 to State Road 2, but that route was never built.

== Major intersections ==
The entire route is in Lake County.

Location	mi	km	Destinations	Notes
Hobart	0.000	0.000	US 30 – Merrillville, Valparaiso	Southern terminus of SR 51
Hobart	5.499	8.850	SR 130 east – Valparaiso	Southern end of SR 130 concurrency
Hobart	6.508	10.474	US 6 east / SR 130 east – Westville	Southern end of US 6 concurrency; Western terminus of SR 130
Lake Station	8.733– 8.866	14.054– 14.268	I-80 / I-94 / US 6 west – Chicago, Detroit	Northern end of US 6 concurrency
Lake Station	9.557	15.381	US 20 – Gary, Michigan City	Northern terminus of SR 51
1.000 mi = 1.609 km; 1.000 km = 0.621 mi: Concurrency terminus
