= Indiana State Road 249 =

Highway in Indiana

State Road 249
- Crisman Road
- SR 249 highlighted in red

Route information
- Maintained by INDOT
- Length: 2.443 mi (3.932 km)

Major junctions
- South end: US 20 at Portage
- I-94 near Portage
- North end: US 12 near Burns Harbor

Location
- Country: United States
- State: Indiana
- Counties: Porter

Highway system
- Indiana State Highway System; Interstate; US; State; Scenic
← SR 246	→ SR 250

State Road 249 (SR 249) is a part of the Indiana State Road that runs between Portage and Burns Harbor in the US state of Indiana. The 2.42 miles (3.89 km) of SR 249 that lie within Indiana serve as an access to the Port of Indiana. No section of the highway is listed on the National Highway System. Most of the road is an urban four-lane divided highway, passing through farmland, residential and industrial properties.

== Route description ==
SR 249 heads north from the southern terminus at a traffic light with US 20. The highway is a four-lane divided highway, passing through commercial areas. The road has an interchange with I-94, 0.24 miles (0.39 km) north of US 20. After I–94, the route passes through residential properties and takes a sharp turn heading due east. During the curve, highway has a traffic light at Midwest Steel Access Road, with access to US 12. The road passes through farmland with a few industrial properties and begins to curves northeast. During the curve is an interchange with US 12. North of US 12 the road continues with SR 249, as George Nelson Drive and is only for traffic to and from the Port of Indiana. After George Nelson Drive passes over a set of railroad tracks is a permission gate.

No segment of State Road 249 in Indiana that is included in the National Highway System (NHS). The NHS is a network of highways that are identified as being most important for the economy, mobility and defense of the nation. The highway is maintained by the Indiana Department of Transportation (INDOT) like all other state roads in the state. The department tracks the traffic volumes along all state roads as a part of its maintenance responsibilities using a metric called average annual daily traffic (AADT). This measurement is a calculation of the traffic level along a segment of roadway for any average day of the year. In 2010, INDOT figured that lowest traffic levels were 10,366 vehicles and 398 commercial vehicles used the highway daily north of Midwest Steel Highway. The peak traffic volumes were 21,253 vehicles and 817 commercial vehicles AADT along the section of SR 249 between US 20 and I–94.

== Major intersections ==
The entire route is in Porter County.

Location	mi	km	Destinations	Notes
Portage	0.000	0.000	US 20 – Gary, Michigan City	Southern terminus
Portage	0.110– 0.367	0.177– 0.591	I-94 – Hammond, Michigan City, Chicago, Detroit	I-94 exit 19
Burns Harbor	2.443	3.932	US 12 / LMCT – Gary, Michigan City	Northern terminus
1.000 mi = 1.609 km; 1.000 km = 0.621 mi

== See also ==
- Indiana State Road 49
- Indiana State Road 149
