= Bailly Generating Station =

Power plant in Indiana, USA

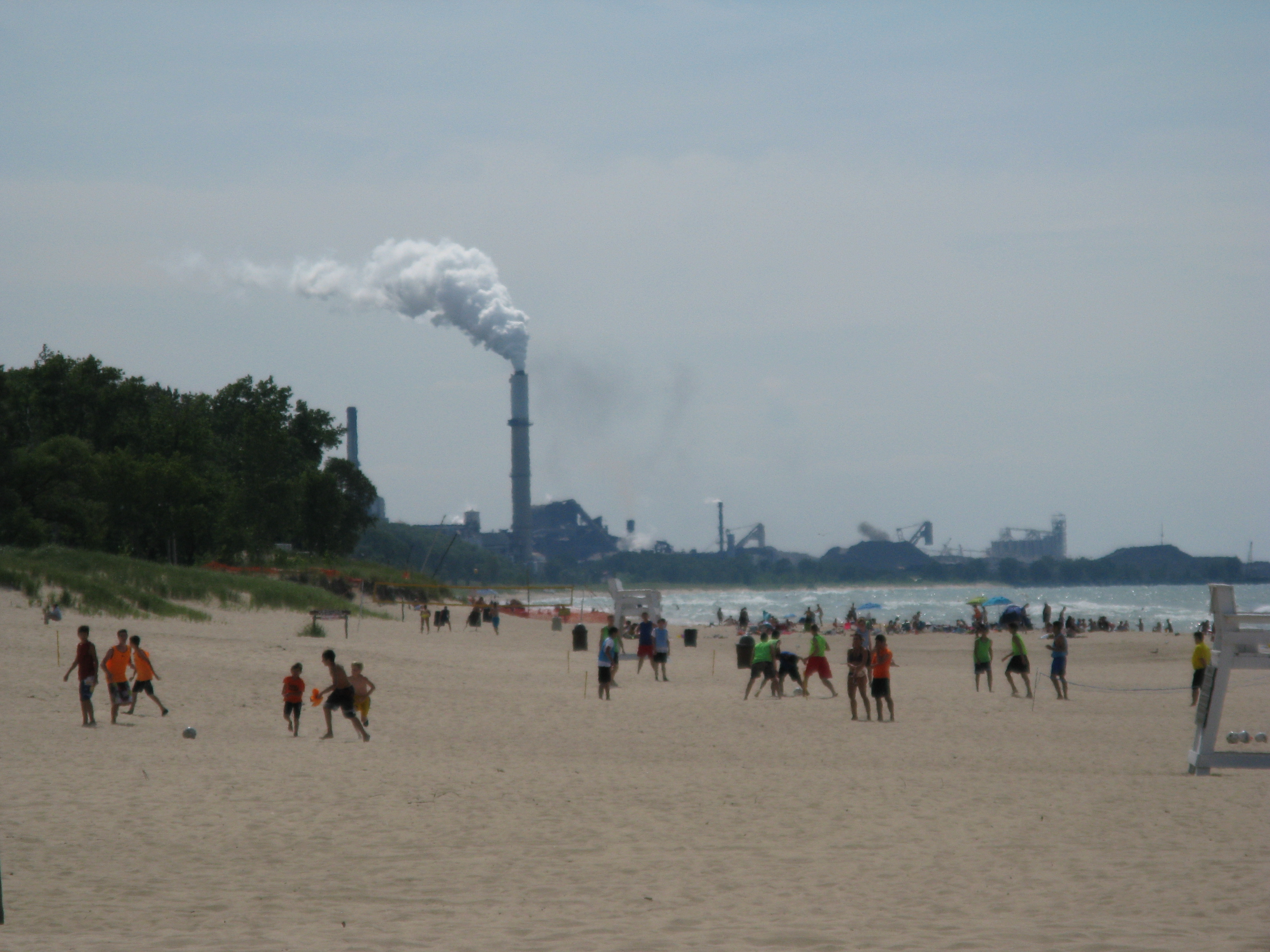
- Bailly Generating Station in 2013
- Country: United States
- Location: Burns Harbor, Indiana
- Coordinates: 41°38′36″N 87°07′22″W
- Status: Decommissioned
- Commission date: Unit 1: 1962; Unit 2: 1968
- Decommission date: Units 1–2: May 31, 2018
- Owner: Northern Indiana Public Service Company (NIPSCO)
- Operator: Northern Indiana Public Service Company (NIPSCO)

Thermal power station
- Primary fuel: Coal
- Cooling source: Lake Michigan

Power generation
- Nameplate capacity: 604 MW

External links
- Commons: Related media on Commons

The Bailly Generating Station was a 604-megawatt (MW) coal power plant located in Burns Harbor, Indiana, on the shore of Lake Michigan adjacent to the Port of Indiana. The plant, which began operation in 1962 and tripled its capacity in 1968, is owned and operated by the Northern Indiana Public Service Company (NIPSCO), an electric-utility operating division of the energy holding company NiSource. The plant ceased coal-fired electrical generation on May 31, 2018.

== History ==
The Bailly Station is named in honor of Joseph Bailly, a fur trader and pioneer settler of northwest Indiana. It is located in an industrial park sited within the Indiana Dunes National Lakeshore. The plant's 300-acre site reflects a belief, held by the state of Indiana and the United States Congress in the early 1960s, that the Dunes-Lake Michigan shoreline should be shared between environmental preservation and heavy industry.

Since January 2011, Bailly has operated under the terms of a legal settlement between NIPSCO and the United States Environmental Protection Agency in compliance with the Clean Air Act. Under the terms of the settlement, NiSource would have been required to invest approximately $200 million in new capital infrastructure to be retrofitted onto Bailly to capture sulphur dioxide (SO_{2}) and nitrogen oxide (NO_{x}).

=== Closure of coal units ===
Citing growing environmental and regulatory burdens, NIPSCO announced plans in August 2016 to shut down the Bailly Generating Plant. The Midcontinent Independent System Operator (MISO) approved of the shut down in December 2016 after it was determined the plant's future closure would not affect the grid's reliability. The plant shut down electrical generation from coal on May 31, 2018. Nevertheless, the site will continue to operate a natural gas peaker plant.

== See also ==
- Bailly Nuclear Power Plant (cancelled in 1981 prior to construction)
