= U.S. Route 6 in Indiana =

Highway in Indiana

U.S. Route 6
- Grand Army of the Republic Highway
- US 6 highlighted in red

Route information
- Maintained by INDOT
- Length: 149.490 mi (240.581 km)
- Existed: June 8, 1931–present

Major junctions
- West end: I-80 / I-94 / US 6 at the Illinois state line in Munster
- I-80 / I-94 / US 41 in Hammond; SR 912 in Gary; I-65 in Gary; US 421 near Westville; US 35 from Kingsbury to South Center; US 31 near La Paz; US 33 in Ligonier; I-69 near Waterloo
- East end: US 6 at the Ohio state line near Butler

Location
- Country: United States
- State: Indiana
- Counties: Lake, Porter, LaPorte, St. Joseph, Marshall, Elkhart, Noble, DeKalb

Highway system
- United States Numbered Highway System; List; Special; Divided; Indiana State Highway System; Interstate; US; State; Scenic
| ← US 421 | IN | → US 12 |
| ← SR 5 | IN | → SR 7 |

U.S. Route 6 (US 6) is a part of the United States Numbered Highway System that runs from California to Provincetown, Massachusetts. In Indiana, it is part of the Indiana state road system that enters the state concurrent with the Borman Expressway between Lansing, Illinois, and Munster, Indiana. The 149 miles (240 km) of US 6 that lie within Indiana serve as a major conduit. Some sections of the highway is listed on the National Highway System. Various sections are rural two-lane highway and urbanized four-lane divided highways. The easternmost community along the highway is Butler at the Ohio state line.

US 6 passes through farmfields and forestlands and along the northern part of Indiana. The highway is included in the Grand Army of the Republic Highway. US 6 was first designated as a U.S. Route in 1932. A section of the highway originally served as part of Sauk Indian Trail. US 6 replaced the original State Road 17 (SR 17) designation of the highway which dated back to the formation of the Indiana state road system. SR 17 ran from Ligonier through Kendallville to Waterloo and ended in Butler. US 6 also replaced the second designation of the highway, State Road 6 (SR 6), through most of the state.

== Route description ==
US 6 enters Indiana concurrent with I-80/I-94 on the Borman Expressway, from Illinois. The concurrency passes through several communities in Lake County before US 6 leaves the Borman in Lake Station at the Ripley Street exit. US 6 heads south on Ripley Street, concurrent with SR 51, passing through Lake Station. The road enters Hobart, before turning east, leaving SR 51, before leaving Lake County and entering Porter County. In Porter County, US 6 continues east as a four-lane road passing through commercial properties. US 6 has an intersection with SR 149. East of this intersection, US 6 becomes a two-lane rural road passing through residential properties with some fields. The road becomes a four-lane divided highway passing south of the Porter Regional Hospital and through an interchange with SR 49. East of SR 49, the roadway reduces back to a two-lane road, before passing over CSX Transportation's Garrett Subdivision. East of the tracks, US 6 becomes a three-lane roadway, with two-lanes eastbound and one-lane westbound, before reducing back to a two-lane roadway. US 6 leaves Porter County and enters LaPorte County, before entering Westville. In Westville, US 6 has an intersection with SR 2 before US 6 turns south concurrent with US 421. The concurrency heads south for a short distance, passing east of the Westville Correctional Facility, before US 6 turns toward the east and US 421 continues toward the south. East of US 421, US 6 passes farms and fields. In rural LaPorte County, US 6 has an intersection with SR 39 before an at grade crossing with Canadian National Railway's South Bend Subdivision. Past the railroad tracks, US 6 becomes a four-lane divided road before an intersection with US 35. US 6 and US 35 head south-southeast, and the roadway narrows back to a two-lane highway. The road crosses over CSX Transportation's Garrett Subdivision before passing northeast of Kingsford Heights. Past Kingsofrd Heights, the road bends to become east–west. The concurrency between US 6 and US 35 ends, with US 35 turning south and US 6 continuing east. US 6 crosses over the Kankakee River before entering St. Joseph County. In St. Joseph County, the road enters Walkerton and passing through the southern end of SR 104, near industrial properties. US 6 bends to become southeast–northwest passing through downtown, while, in downtown, US 6 has a short overlap with SR 23. US 6 leaves Walkerton heading southeast, before leaving St. Joseph County and entering Marshall County.

In Marshall County, US 6 curves to become east–west, passing farmland, before the roadway becomes a four-lane divided roadway and enters La Paz. In La Paz, the road passes through commercial properties and an intersection with the Michigan Road, former US 31. Past La Paz, US 6 has an interchange with US 31 before narrowing back to a two-lane rural highway. The highway curves northeast, having an intersection with western end SR 106 and crossing over CSX Transportation's Garrett Subdivision again, before curving to become east–west near an Indiana State Police post. US 6 heads east, having an intersection with a connecting road at connects with SR 331, before bridging over SR 331. The road bends to the southeast, having an intersection with the eastern end of SR 106 before a few more curves, with the road generally traveling in an east-southeast direction. US 6 leaves Marshall County and enters Elkhart County before entering the town of Nappanee.

US 6 enters Nappanee, concurrent with Market Street passing industrial properties, before passing the Stahly–Nissley–Kuhns Farm. The landscape of the road becomes more residential as it enters downtown. In downtown, Nappanee US 6 has an intersection with SR 19. East of SR 19, Market Street passes on the south edge of Nappanee Eastside Historic District, before leaving downtown and passing through a commercial part of town. US 6 passes some more industrial properties before leaving Nappanee. East of Nappanee, US 6 passes south of Nappanee Municipal Airport. Past the airport, the road makes a few curves but is generally east–west. In rural Elkhart County, the road passes mostly farms, with some houses and industrial land mixed in, having an intersection with SR 15 and crosses Norfolk Southern Railway's Marion Branch . North of Syracuse, US 6 has an intersection with SR 13, US 6, and SR 13 head east concurrent, until SR 13 tunes north concurrent with US 33. US 6 continues east, concurrent with US 33. The highway leaves Elkhart County and enters Noble County.

In Noble County, the roadway enters Ligonier passing some industrial properties, before the landscape sounding the road becomes commercial. The overlap between US 6 and US 33 ends at an intersection with SR 5, with US 33 turning south onto SR 5, while US 6 continues toward the east. US 6 leaves Ligonier having a few curves, but staying in a generally east–west direction. US 6 begins an overlap with SR 9 before passing over Norfolk Southern Railway's Chicago Line and through Brimfield. Past Brimfield, the overlap ends with SR 9 turning north, while US 6 continues towards the east, heading toward Kendallville. The road enters Kendallville, concurrent with North Street, passing industrial land, with some commercial properties, before an intersection with SR 3. At this intersection, North Street becomes a four-lane roadway, and SR 3 turns east onto North Street concurrent with US 6. The concurrency ends with SR 3 turning north and US 6 continuing east on North Street. On the east side of Kendallville, US 6 becomes two-lane, passing through commercial and industrial properties, before leaving Kendallville and Noble County.

US 6 enters DeKalb County and has a short overlap with SR 327, before passing through Corunna. Past Corunna, the road has an interchange with I-69 before entering Waterloo. In Waterloo, the road passes industrial land before residential properties as the road enters downtown Waterloo. In downtown, US 6 has an intersection with the southern end of SR 427 before leaving Waterloo. East of Waterloo, US 6 parallels Norfolk Southern Railway's Chicago Line for a short distance, before the road enters Butler, passing industrial and commercial properties. The landscape along becomes residential as the road enters downtown. In downtown, US 6 has an intersection with SR 1. The road crosses Norfolk Southern Railway's Huntington District before leaving Butler and entering rural DeKalb County. In rural DeKalb County, US 6 parallels Norfolk Southern Railway's Chicago Line, passing agriculture land, before US 6 crosses into Ohio.

Only the segment of US 6 that is concurrent with I-80/I-94 and the segment that is concurrent with US 33 are included as a part of the National Highway System (NHS). The NHS is a network of highways that are identified as being most important for the economy, mobility, and defense of the nation. The highway is maintained by the Indiana Department of Transportation (INDOT) like all other U.S. Routes in the state. The department tracks the traffic volumes along all state highways as a part of its maintenance responsibilities using a metric called annual average daily traffic (AADT). This measurement is a calculation of the traffic level along a segment of roadway for any average day of the year. In 2010, INDOT figured that lowest traffic levels were the 2,620 vehicles and 930 commercial vehicles used the highway daily between US 35 and Walkerton. The peak traffic volumes were 166,160 vehicles and 42,090 commercial vehicles AADT along the section of US 6 that is concurrent with the I–80 and I–94.

== History ==
The first route along modern US 6 was used in the 1700s, and it was a Native American trail known as the Great East–West Trail. In 1843, the modern route of US 6 became a gravel roadway, through most of Noble County. During 1918, SR 17 was commissioned along what later would become US 6, from Ligonier to the Ohio–Indiana border. In the 1920s, the Toledo–Chicago Pike was commissioned between Toledo, Ohio, and Chicago using several state roads from Illinois state line, passing through South Bend, to Ligonier and then SR 17 from Ligonier and the Ohio state line.

SR 17 would become SR 6, and SR 6 was extended west to the Illinois state line, in 1926. The first segment of roadway to be paved was between Waterloo and Ohio state line by 1928. In 1928, SR 6 was under construction, along its modern route, from Illinois state line to Ligonier, this route was built to help relieve traffic on the Lincoln Highway and Yellowstone Trail. Also in 1928, the road was paved between Kendallville and Waterloo, with the section from near Ligonier to Kendallville being paved following year. In 1929, construction was completed on the roadway between Illinois and SR 43, now US 421, and at this time the Toledo–Chicago Pike became Cleveland–Chicago Pike. SR 6 was under construction between US 31 and SR 15 in 1931. On June 8, 1931, the American Association of State Highway Officials approved an extension of US 6 from Pennsylvania to Colorado, passing through Indiana along SR 6.

US 6 was rerouted between Illinois state line and US 41 (Calumet Avenue), routed concurrent with US 41 and the Tri-state Highway, this reroute happened in 1953. The highway was rerouted to the modern route through Kendallville in October 1959. US 6 and US 41 was rerouted on to Indianapolis Avenue between 1963 and 1964. A reroute of US 6 to its modern route in Lake County, concurrent with SR 51 and the Borman Expressway, occurred in either 1966 or 1967. US 6 was rerouted around Bremen, on a new roadway, between 1980 and 1981. The old route of US 6 through Bremen became SR 106.

== Major intersections ==
| County | Location | mi | km | Exit | Destinations | Notes |
|---|---|---|---|---|---|---|
| Lake | Hammond | 0.000 | 0.000 | | I-80 west / I-94 west / US 6 west (Kingery Expressway) – Chicago, Des Moines | Illinois State Line |
| Lake | Hammond | 0.875 | 1.408 | 1 | US 41 north (Calumet Avenue) – Hammond, Munster | Western end of US 41 concurrency |
| Lake | Hammond | 2.384 | 3.837 | 2 | US 41 south / SR 152 north (Indianapolis Boulevard) – Hammond, Purdue University Northwest, Highland | Eastern end of US 41 concurrency |
| Lake | Hammond | 3.346– 3.358 | 5.385– 5.404 | 3 | Kennedy Avenue | Serves Visitors' Center |
| Lake | Gary | 4.908 | 7.899 | 5 | SR 912 (Cline Avenue) – Gary/Chicago Airport | |
| Lake | Gary | 6.448 | 10.377 | 6 | Burr Street | |
| Lake | Gary | 8.890 | 14.307 | 9 | Grant Street | |
| Lake | Gary | 9.915 | 15.957 | 10 | SR 53 (Broadway) | Serves Indiana University Northwest |
| Lake | Gary | 10.856– 11.857 | 17.471– 19.082 | 11; 12 | I-65 to I-90 / Indiana Toll Road – Indianapolis | Signed as exits 11 (south) and 12 (north) eastbound and exits 12A (south) and 12B (north) westbound |
| Lake | Lake Station | 12.748 | 20.516 | 13 | Central Avenue | Eastbound exit (shares ramp with I-65 north, Exit 12) and westbound entrance |
| Lake | Lake Station | 15.156– 15.379 | 24.391– 24.750 | 15 | I-80 east / I-94 east to I-90 / SR 51 north / US 20 – Toledo, Detroit | Eastern end of I-80/I-94 concurrency and western end of SR 51 concurrency |
| Lake | Hobart | 17.406 | 28.012 | | SR 51 south / SR 130 east (Hobart Road) | Eastern end of SR 51 concurrency; west end of SR 130 |
| Porter | South Haven | 23.440 | 37.723 | | SR 149 | |
| Porter | Liberty Township | 27.483 | 44.230 | | SR 49 – Valparaiso, Chesterton, Dunes State Park | |
| La Porte | Westville | 34.675 | 55.804 | | SR 2 – Valparaiso, La Porte | Roundabout |
| La Porte | Westville | 35.453 | 57.056 | | US 421 north – Michigan City | Western end of US 421 concurrency |
| La Porte | Westville | 36.674 | 59.021 | | US 421 south – La Crosse | Roundabout; eastern end of US 421 concurrency |
| La Porte | Scipio Township | 44.686 | 71.915 | | SR 39 – La Porte, North Judson | |
| La Porte | Kingsbury | 46.903 | 75.483 | | US 35 north – La Porte | Western end of US 35 concurrency |
| La Porte | South Center | 51.850 | 83.444 | | US 35 south – Knox | Eastern end of US 35 concurrency |
| St. Joseph | Walkerton | 59.478 | 95.721 | | SR 104 north – La Porte, Fish Lake | |
| St. Joseph | Walkerton | 60.155 | 96.810 | | SR 23 north | Western end of SR 23 concurrency |
| St. Joseph | Walkerton | 60.292 | 97.031 | | SR 23 south | Eastern end of SR 23 concurrency |
| Marshall | La Paz | 69.685 | 112.147 | | Michigan Road – South Bend, LaVille School | Formerly US 31 |
| Marshall | North Township | 70.489– 70.698 | 113.441– 113.777 | | US 31 – Plymouth, South Bend | |
| Marshall | Bremen | 75.094 | 120.852 | | SR 106 east – Bremen | Western terminus of SR 106 |
| Marshall | Bremen | 77.989 | 125.511 | | SR 331 – Bremen, Mishawaka | |
| Marshall | Bremen | 79.241 | 127.526 | | SR 106 west – Bremen | Eastern terminus of SR 106 |
| Elkhart | Nappanee | 86.310 | 138.902 | | SR 19 | |
| Elkhart | Jackson Township | 92.418 | 148.732 | | CR 17 – Goshen, Dunlap, Elkhart | |
| Elkhart | Jackson Township | 94.579 | 152.210 | | SR 15 – Warsaw, Goshen | |
| Elkhart | Benton Township | 99.446 | 160.043 | | SR 13 south / CR 33 north – Syracuse | Western end of SR 13 concurrency |
| Elkhart | Benton Township | 102.216 | 164.501 | | US 33 north / SR 13 north – Goshen, Middlebury | Eastern end of SR 13 concurrency; western end of US 33 concurrency |
| Noble | Ligonier | 107.973 | 173.766 | | US 33 south / SR 5 / Lincoln Highway – Fort Wayne, Ligonier | Eastern end of US 33 concurrency |
| Noble | Elkhart–Orange township line | 116.689 | 187.793 | | SR 9 south – Albion, Chain O'Lakes State Park | Western end of SR 9 concurrency |
| Noble | Elkhart–Orange township line | 119.535 | 192.373 | | SR 9 north – Rome City, Lagrange, Gene Stratton-Porter State Historic Site | Eastern end of SR 9 concurrency |
| Noble | Kendallville | 124.128 | 199.765 | | SR 3 south | Western end of SR 3 concurrency |
| Noble | Kendallville | 124.763 | 200.787 | | SR 3 north | Eastern end of SR 3 concurrency |
| DeKalb | Corunna | 130.946 | 210.737 | | SR 327 north | Western end of SR 327 concurrency |
| DeKalb | Corunna | 131.411 | 211.486 | | SR 327 south – Garrett | Eastern end of SR 327 concurrency |
| DeKalb | Waterloo | 136.234– 136.341 | 219.247– 219.420 | | I-69 – Fort Wayne, Lansing | Exit 334 on I-69 |
| DeKalb | Waterloo | 138.157 | 222.342 | | SR 427 north | Southern end of SR 427 |
| DeKalb | Butler | 144.417 | 232.417 | | CR 61 – Steel Mill | |
| DeKalb | Butler | 145.928 | 234.848 | | SR 1 | |
| DeKalb | Stafford Township | 149.490 | 240.581 | | US 6 east – Edgerton, Napoleon | Ohio state line |
1.000 mi = 1.609 km; 1.000 km = 0.621 mi: Concurrency terminus; Incomplete access; Unopened

== See also ==
U.S. Route 6
| Previous state: Illinois | Indiana | Next state: Ohio |
