= Indiana State Road 520 =

State highway in Indiana, United States

State Road 520
- Maple Street
- SR 520 highlighted in red

Route information
- Maintained by INDOT
- Length: 0.248 mi (399 m)

Major junctions
- South end: US 20 in Town of Pines
- North end: US 12 in Town of Pines

Location
- Country: United States
- State: Indiana

Highway system
- Indiana State Highway System; Interstate; US; State; Scenic
← I-469	→ SR 524

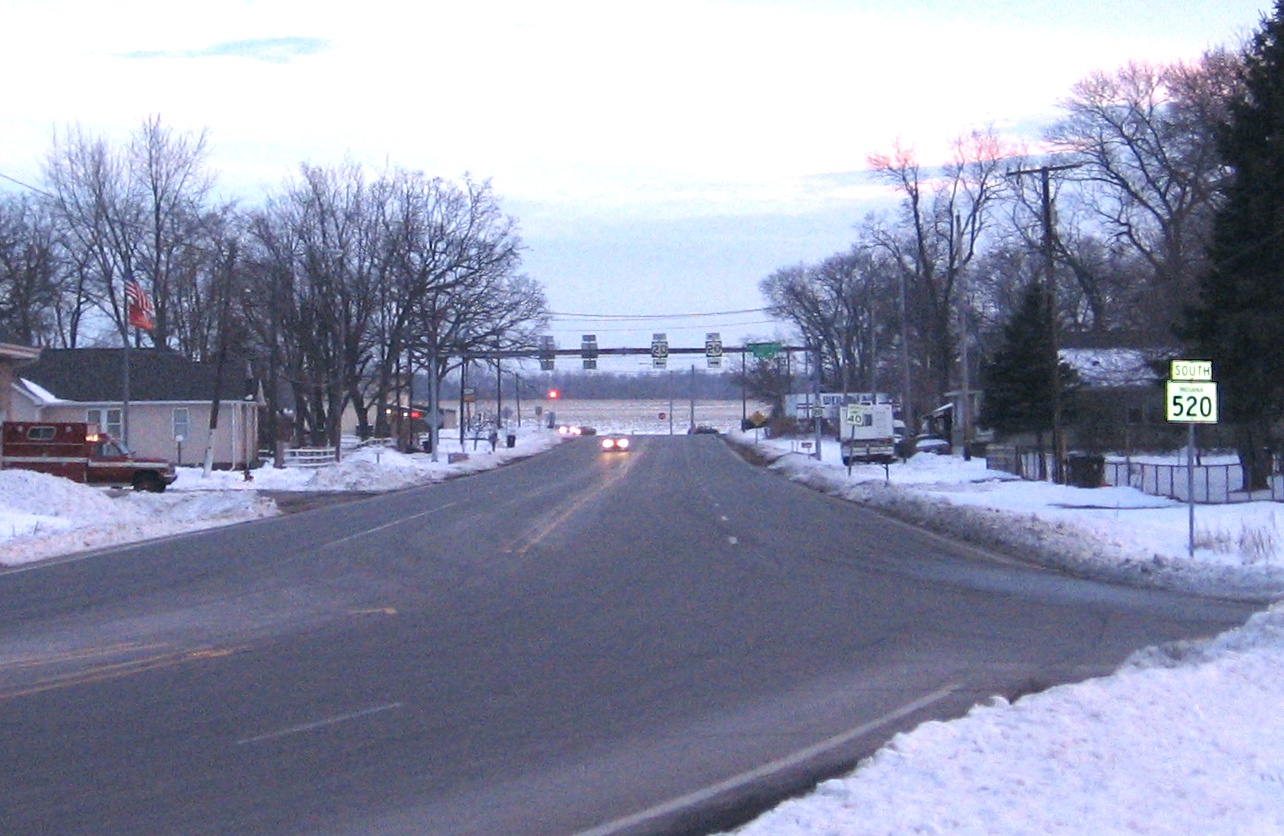
The entirety of State Road 520, looking south from its intersection with U.S. Route 12.

State Road 520 is a four-lane connector about 1,000 feet (300 m) in length. It exists solely to connect U.S. Route 12 and U.S. Route 20 in Pines, about 3 miles (4.8 km) west of Michigan City. U.S. 12 and U.S. 20 do not cross with each other — they parallel each other for another 22 miles (35 km) westbound and overlap in Gary; U.S. 20 is generally considered the faster of the two, while U.S. 12 is the scenic Dunes Highway. Eastbound, U.S. 12 travels through Michigan City and northeast into Michigan where it forks east from the Red Arrow Highway. U.S. 20 stays in Indiana and runs around Michigan City as a bypass to the south.

State Road 520 is the shortest designated highway in the State of Indiana.

== Route description ==
State Road 520 begins at a 3-way intersection with U.S. Route 20. The road is locally known as Maple Street and is an undivided four-lane road for its entire length. It heads north from this intersection and soon reaches another 3-way intersection with a local road known as Pine Street. A motel is located at the intersection across from Pine Street. SR 520 passes under a directional sign at its halfway point. The road passes by a fire station before it meets US 12 at another 3-way intersection. There are a total of eight houses on SR 520, plus a storage facility near the US 20 interchange. Several houses also have driveways on the road.

== Major intersections ==
The entire route is in Town of Pines, Porter County.

mi	km	Destinations	Notes
0.000	0.000	US 20 – South Bend, Gary	Southern terminus of SR 520
0.248	0.399	US 12 / LMCT – Michigan City	Northern terminus of SR 520
1.000 mi = 1.609 km; 1.000 km = 0.621 mi
