= Indiana State Road 312 =

Highway in Indiana

State Road 312
- Chicago Avenue
- SR 312 highlighted in red

Route information
- Maintained by INDOT
- Length: 3.042 mi (4.896 km)

Major junctions
- West end: White Oak Avenue in East Chicago
- US 20 in East Chicago
- East end: US 12 / SR 912 in East Chicago

Location
- Country: United States
- State: Indiana
- Counties: Lake

Highway system
- Indiana State Highway System; Interstate; US; State; Scenic
| ← SR 301 | → SR 327 |

State Road 312 in the U.S. state of Indiana is an east–west state highway that is located in the northwestern part of the state.

== Route description ==
SR 312 heads east from White Oak Avenue next to the Bishop Noll Institute and enters a mostly commercial area, having an intersection with U.S. Route 20 (US 20). The highway crosses over the Indiana Ship Canal and passes between industrial properties. SR 312 eastern terminus is at an interchange with US 12 and SR 912. Chicago Avenue continues east of US 12 and SR 912 as a short street, passing through more industrial properties before dead-ending at a railroad.

No part of SR 312 is included as a part of the National Highway System (NHS). The NHS is a network of highways that are identified as being most important for the economy, mobility and defense of the nation. The highway is maintained by the Indiana Department of Transportation (INDOT) like all other state roads in the state. The department tracks the traffic volumes along all state highways, using a metric called average annual daily traffic (AADT), as a part of its maintenance responsibilities. This measurement is a calculation of the traffic level along a segment of roadway for any average day of the year. In 2010, INDOT figured that lowest traffic levels were the 5,400 vehicles and 260 commercial vehicles that used the highway daily on a section that is concurrent with Sheffield Avenue. The peak traffic volumes were 15,310 vehicles and 1,090 commercial vehicles AADT along a section of SR 312 between the Indiana Toll Road and US 20.

== Major intersections ==
The entire route is in Lake County.

| Location | mi | km | Destinations | Notes |
|---|---|---|---|---|
| Hammond–East Chicago city line | 0.000 | 0.000 | Chicago Avenue; White Oak Avenue | Roadway continues west as Chicago Avenue |
| East Chicago | 0.498 | 0.801 | US 20 (Indianapolis Boulevard) | |
| East Chicago–Gary city line | 3.042 | 4.896 | SR 912 / US 12 / LMCT (Cline Avenue) | Eastern terminus of SR 312 |
1.000 mi = 1.609 km; 1.000 km = 0.621 mi
