= Indiana State Road 53 =

14-mile thoroughfare mostly in Lake County, US

State Road 53
- Broadway
- SR 53 highlighted in red

Route information
- Maintained by INDOT
- Length: 14.019 mi (22.561 km)
- Existed: October 1, 1926–present

Major junctions
- South end: US 231 in Crown Point
- US 30 in Merrillville, I-80 / I-94 / US 6 Gary; US 12 / US 20 in Gary
- North end: I-90 Toll / Indiana Toll Road in Gary

Location
- Country: United States
- State: Indiana
- Counties: Lake

Highway system
- Indiana State Highway System; Interstate; US; State; Scenic
← US 52	→ SR 54

State Road 53 (SR 53) is a part of the Indiana State Road that runs between Crown Point and Gary in the US state of Indiana. The 14.07 miles (22.64 km) of SR 53 that lie within Gary is also known as Broadway. No part of the highway is listed on the National Highway System. Most of the road is an urban four-lane undivided highway, passing through residential and commercial properties.

== Route description ==
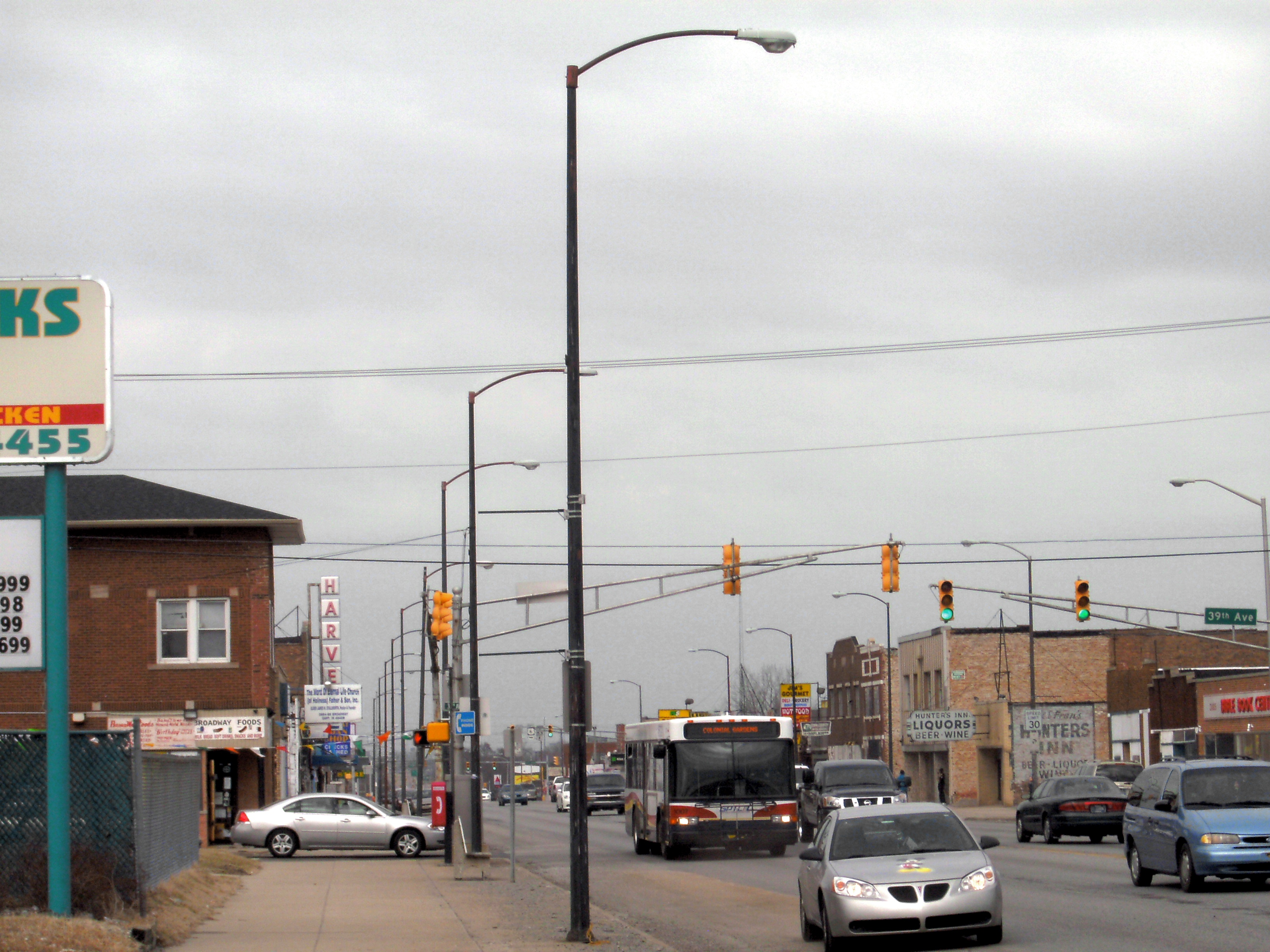
Looking north on State Road 53 in the Glen Park neighborhood of Gary.

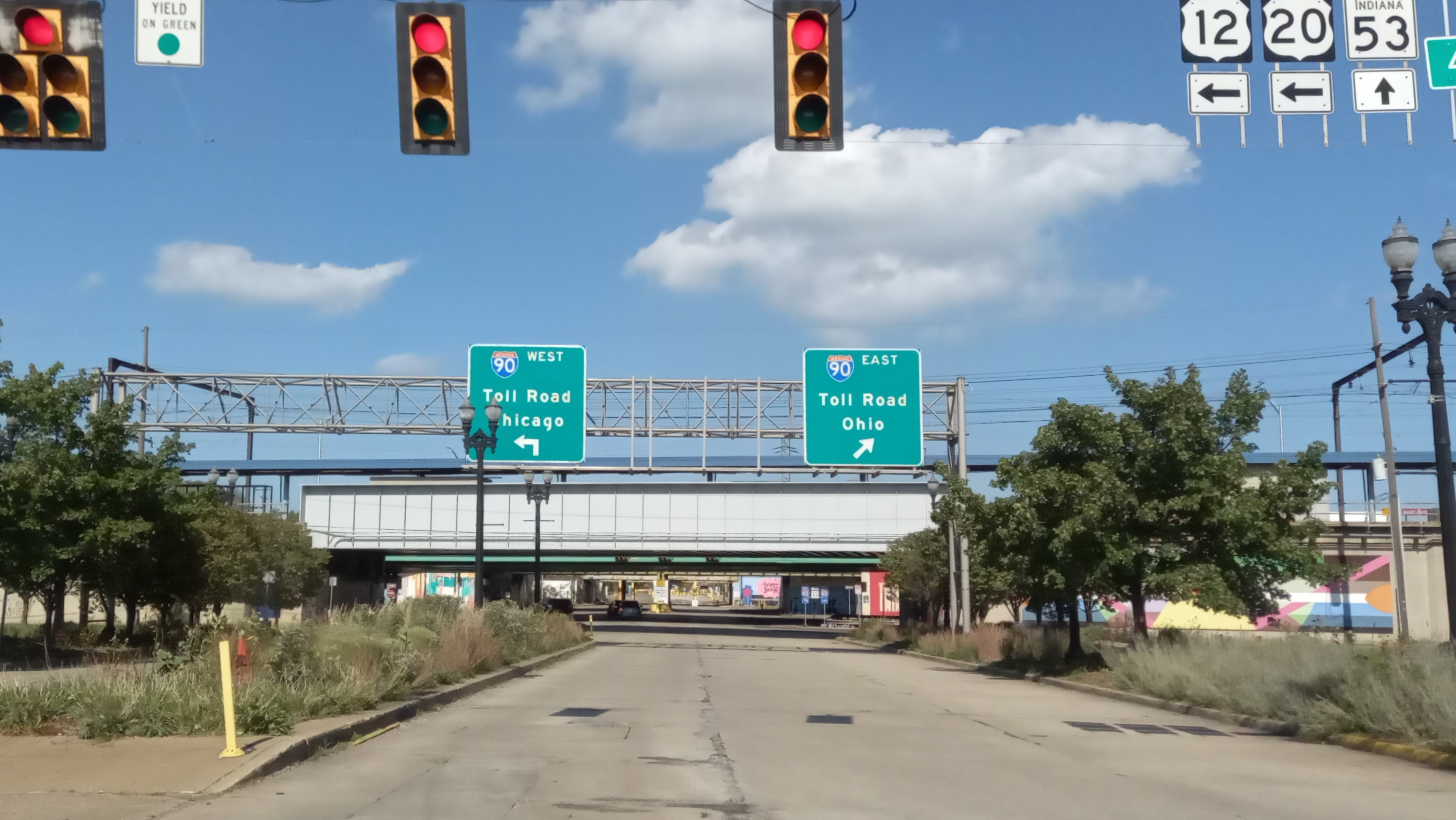
Northern terminus of SR 53 at I-90

SR 53 heads north from the southern terminus at U.S. Route 231 (US 231), concurrent with Broadway. The road is two-lane highway passing through a farmland with residential houses. The highway becomes a four-lane divided highway, still passing through a mix of farmland and residential, at 93rd Avenue. As the route enters Merrillville the farmland and residential turns into commercial properties. In Merrillville the road has a traffic light at US 30. North of US 30 the road becomes a for-lane undivided highway with a center turn lane as it passes through commercial properties. At 73rd Street the route begins to enter a more residential area with few commercial properties. The highway crosses a set of railroad tracks on the north side of Merrillville. North of Merrillville the road enters Gary and passes through a mix of residential and commercial properties, staying as a four-lane undivided highway with a center turn lane. The road crosses a signal railroad track and has a traffic light at Ridge Road (old US 6). North of 33rd Avenue the road becomes a four-lane undivided highway without a center turn lane, as the road passes through a mostly wooded area. The route has an interchange with Borman Expressway (Interstate 80 (I–80) and I–94). The highway heads north towards downtown Gary passing three single track railroad crossings. In downtown Gary the route has an intersection with the one-way streets of Fifth Avenue, eastbound US 12/US 20 and Fourth Avenue, westbound US 12/US 20. North of Fourth Avenue the road passes under the Shore Shore line, a Commuter rail line. After passing the South Shore line the highway has an interchange with the I–90/Indiana Toll Road. This interchange is the north terminus of SR 53, but Broadway continues north passing under three sets of railroad tacks. Broadway ends at a security gate for the main entrance of Gary Works owned by U.S. Steel.

No part of SR 53 is included as a part of the National Highway System (NHS). The NHS is a network of highways that are identified as being most important for the economy, mobility and defense of the nation. The highway is maintained by the Indiana Department of Transportation (INDOT) like all other state roads in the state. The department tracks the traffic volumes along all state highways as a part of its maintenance responsibilities using a metric called average annual daily traffic (AADT). This measurement is a calculation of the traffic level along a segment of roadway for any average day of the year. In 2010, INDOT figured that lowest traffic levels were the 10,470 vehicles and 490 commercial vehicles used the highway daily on a section between US 231 and 113th Avenue south of Merrillville. The peak traffic volumes were 29,200 vehicles and 1,460 commercial vehicles AADT along a section of SR 53 between 35th Avenue and Borman Expressway in Gary.

== History ==
SR 53 used to terminate at US 52 in Montmorenci where it followed the current routing of US 231 to Crown Point.

In 1952, when US 231 was commissioned in Indiana, SR 53 became concurrent with US 231 to Crown Point. The routing stayed the same until SR 53's southern terminus was truncated to Crown Point in 1973 in favor of US 231.

== Major intersections ==
The entire route is in Lake County.

Location	mi	km	Destinations	Notes
Center Township	0.000	0.000	US 231 – Crown Point, Lafayette	Southern terminus of SR 53
Merrillville	4.877	7.849	US 30 / Lincoln Highway – Valparaiso, Fort Wayne, Chicago	
Gary	11.263– 11.621	18.126– 18.702	I-80 / I-94 / US 6 (Borman Expressway) – Detroit, Chicago	Exit number 10 on I-80/I-94
Gary	13.904	22.376	US 12 east / US 20 east / LMCT / 5th Avenue	
Gary	14.019	22.561	US 12 west / US 20 west / LMCT / 4th Avenue; Broadway	Northern terminus of SR 53; roadway continues north as Broadway towards I-90/Indiana Toll Road
1.000 mi = 1.609 km; 1.000 km = 0.621 mi
