= U.S. Route 20 in Indiana =

Section of U.S. Highway in Indiana

U.S. Route 20
- US 20 highlighted in red, US 20 Bus. in blue

Route information
- Maintained by INDOT
- Length: 155.734 mi (250.630 km)
- Existed: 1926–present

Major junctions
- West end: US 12 / US 20 / US 41 at the Illinois state line in Whiting
- US 41 at Whiting; US 12 at Gary; I-65 / I-90 / Indiana Toll Road at Gary; US 421 at Michigan City; I-94 near Michigan City; US 35 near Michigan City; US 31 at South Bend; US 33 at Elkhart; I-69 near Angola
- East end: US 20 at the Ohio state line near Columbia, OH

Location
- Country: United States
- State: Indiana
- Counties: Lake, Porter, LaPorte, St. Joseph, Elkhart, LaGrange, Steuben

Highway system
- United States Numbered Highway System; List; Special; Divided; Indiana State Highway System; Interstate; US; State; Scenic
← SR 19	→ SR 22

U.S. Route 20 (US 20) in Indiana is a main east–west highway that is parallel to the Indiana Toll Road. The western terminus of US 20 is at the Illinois state line and the eastern terminus is at the Ohio state line. US 20 through Whiting, East Chicago, and Gary is concurrent with US 12 twice. The route varies between one-way, two-lane, and four-lane streets, in Northwest Indiana. From the east side of Gary to west of South Bend, US 20 is a four-lane, undivided highway. The route then heads around the west and south sides of South Bend and Elkhart as a four-lane, limited access, divided highway. East of State Road 15 (SR 15), US 20 is two-lane, rural highway.

US 20 was part of the Dunes Highway from the Illinois state line to Michigan City, concurrent with US 12. The Dunes Highway started being paved in 1922. The section of the highway that is known as Lincoln Way was part of the 1913 section of the Lincoln Highway. Indiana State Highway Commission, later renamed Indiana Department of Transportation (INDOT), began signing US 20 in 1926. US 20 went through downtown South Bend and Elkhart before the St. Joseph Valley Parkway was built. Before the parkway was completed, the route that was open to traffic was called US 20 Bypass (US 20 Byp.). A small realignment in LaGrange County was done in 2005, in which the roadway was straightened. Other small realignments included the route through Michigan City, which followed US 35 from US 12 to Interstate 94 (I-94).

== Route description ==
Only the segment of US 20 that is concurrent with the St. Joseph Valley Parkway is included as a part of the National Highway System (NHS). The NHS is a network of highways that are identified as being most important for the economy, mobility, and defense of the nation. The highway is maintained by INDOT like all other U.S. Highways in the state. The department tracks the traffic volumes along all state highways as a part of its maintenance responsibilities using a metric called annual average daily traffic (AADT). This measurement is a calculation of the traffic level along a segment of roadway for any average day of the year. In 2010, INDOT figured that lowest traffic levels were the 3,390 vehicles and 1,090 commercial vehicles used the highway daily near the Ohio state line. The peak traffic volumes were 36,040 vehicles and 731 commercial vehicles AADT along the section of US 20 concurrent with SR 331.

=== Illinois to South Bend ===
US 20 enters Indiana concurrent with US 12 and US 41, at which point it passes under the Indiana Toll Road. The road passes by both commercial and industrial areas, between Wolf Lake and Horseshoe Casino. US 12, US 20, and US 41 are concurrent until US 41 turns south on Calumet Avenue. US 12 and US 20 head southeast toward East Chicago; in East Chicago, US 12 turns east and US 20 continues south. US 20 meets SR 312 and passes under the Indiana Toll Road. US 20 turns left onto Michigan Street and heads east to Gary passing both industrial and residential areas. On the way to Gary, US 20 has an interchange with SR 912; at the interchange, the road name changes to 5th Avenue. Just west of Gary, US 12 and US 20 have a concurrency.

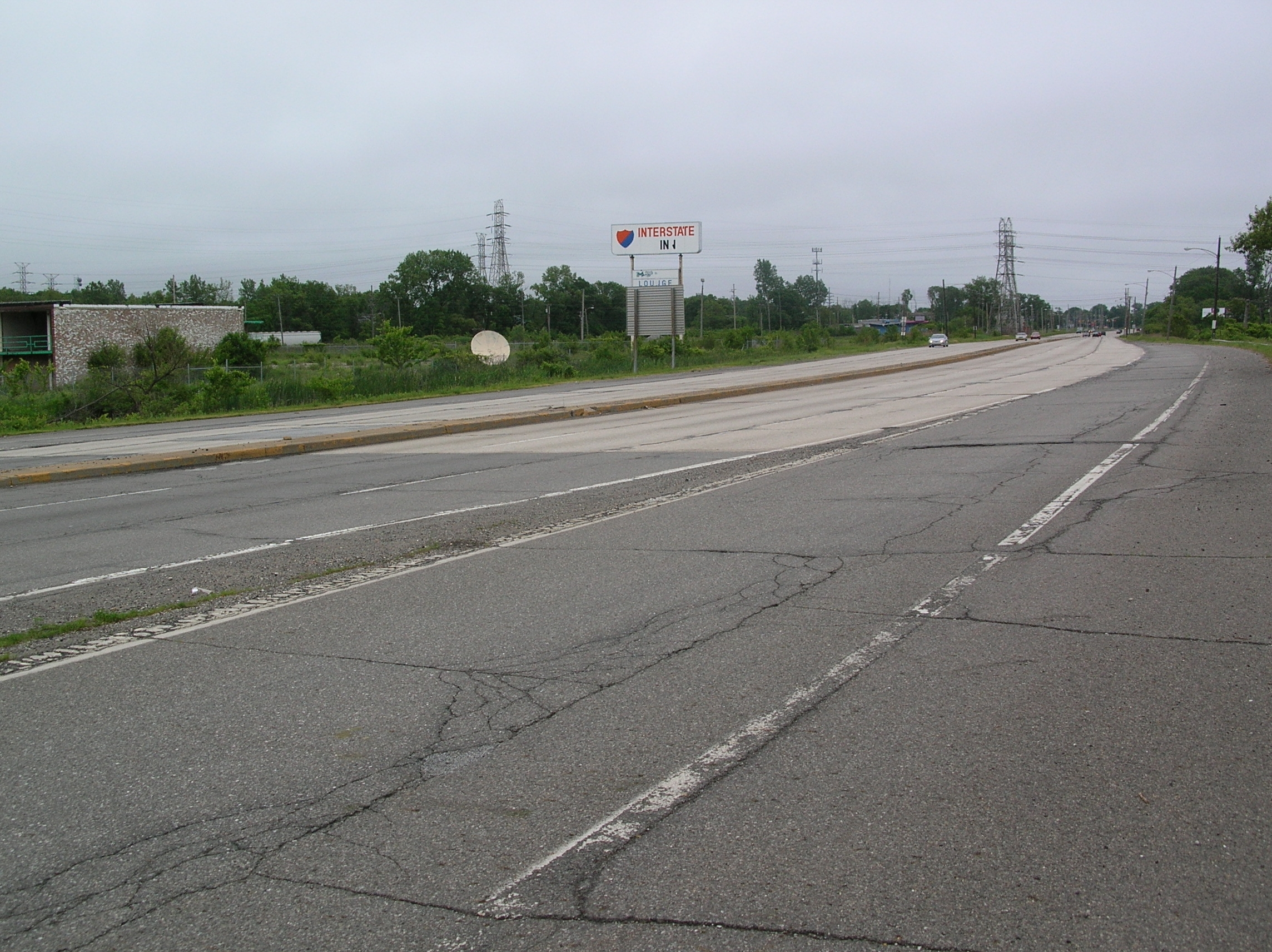
View eastward on Dunes Highway between I-65 and the US 12/US 20 split, in Gary

US 12 and US 20 are concurrent through most of Gary. From Bridge Street to Vermont Street, the eastbound traffic of US 12/US 20 is on 5th Avenue and westbound traffic is on 4th Avenue. East of Downtown Gary, the eastbound and westbound lanes merge to form the Dunes Highway. Before reaching the neighborhoods of northeastern Gary, the Dunes Highway has an interchange with I-65 and I-90/Indiana Toll Road.

Shortly thereafter, US 12 leaves to the northeast toward Michigan City and US 20 heads east then northeast, forming a major retail corridor through the neighborhoods of Aetna and Miller Beach. US 20 then meets SR 51 at the state road's northern terminus, near the boundary between Lake Station and Gary. Just west of Portage, the road passes under I-94. In Portage, the route has intersections with both SR 249 and SR 149. The road now enters Burns Harbor and has interchanges with I-94 and SR 49, just south of Indiana Dunes National Park. The route heads northeast until Town of Pines, where it intersects with SR 520. After Pines, the route heads due east to US 421 in Michigan City.

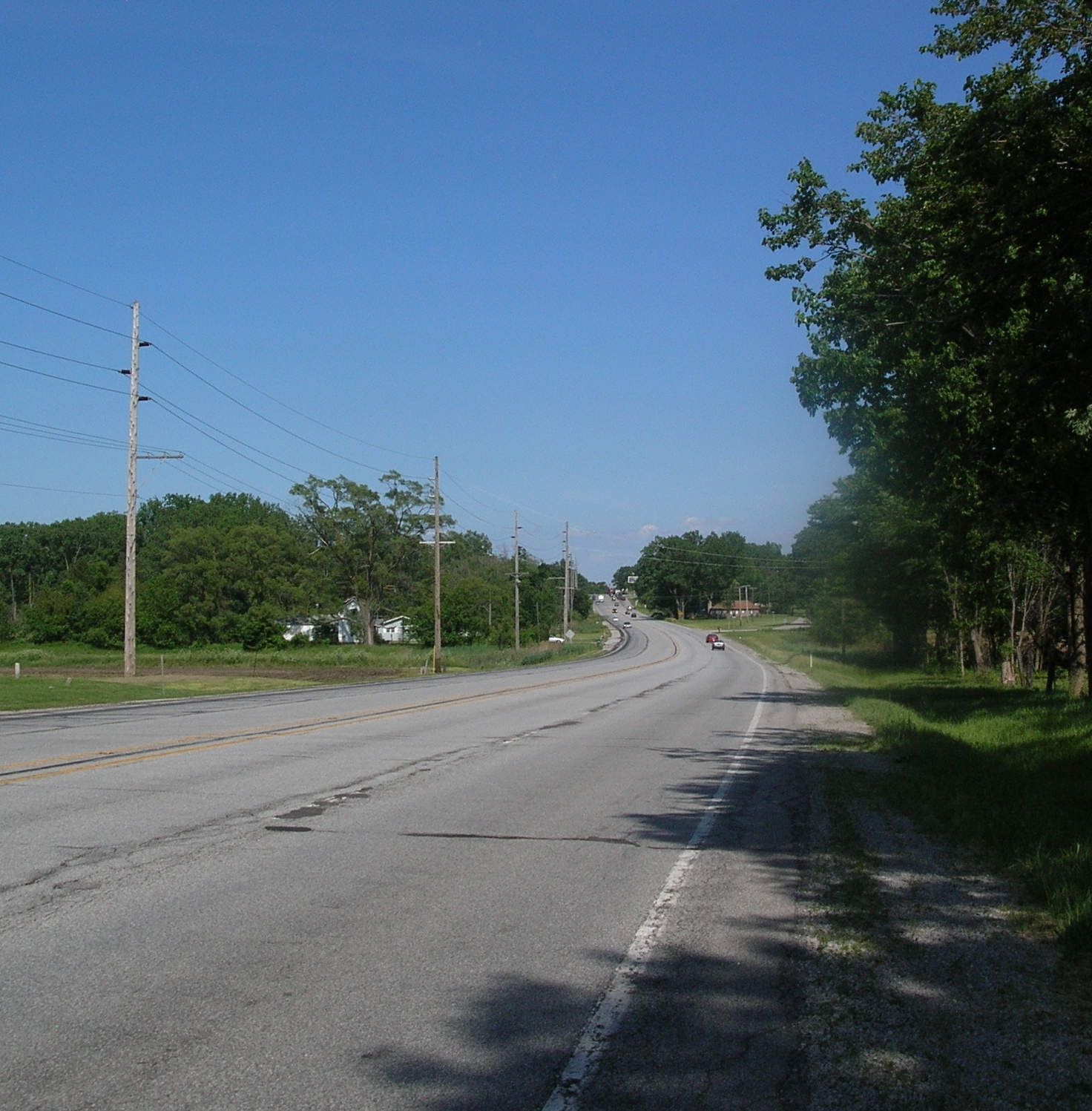
US 20 approaching Springville from the west

From US 421, the route heads east and then northeast around Michigan City. On the east side of Michigan City, the route has an interchange with both SR 212 and I-94 followed by an intersection with the northern terminus of US 35. After US 35, the route becomes a four-lane undivided highway until Rolling Prairie, passing SR 39 at Springville. East of Rolling Prairie the route meets SR 2. US 20 heads northeast and then east and SR 2 heads due east. The route passes through Hudson Lake and New Carlisle before South Bend.

=== South Bend to Ohio ===
On the west side of South Bend, near the city's airport, US 20 meets and exits onto the St. Joseph Valley Parkway which then runs due south along with US 31. At this cloverleaf interchange, the continuing road to the east is Lincolnway West, the original routing of US 20 into the city, which has been modified from its original alignment to skirt the south end of an extended runway at the airport. Now concurrent with US 31, the St. Joseph Valley Parkway has another cloverleaf junction, with SR 2 on Western Avenue, before it curves to the southeast to run along the southwest side of South Bend. The freeway then turns due east before encountering yet another cloverleaf interchange, this one with departing US 31 and Michigan Street, just south of downtown South Bend. Further east, on the south side of Mishawaka, US 20 has a 2.09-mile (3.36 km) concurrency with SR 331. The road has a partial cloverleaf interchange with US 33 near Dunlap. The interchange with Old US 20 is incomplete with no access to westbound Old US 20 from eastbound US 20. Soon after the junction with Old US 20 is an interchange with County Road 17 (CR 17). The CR 17 interchange marks the eastern terminus of the limited-access freeway known as the St. Joseph Valley Parkway.

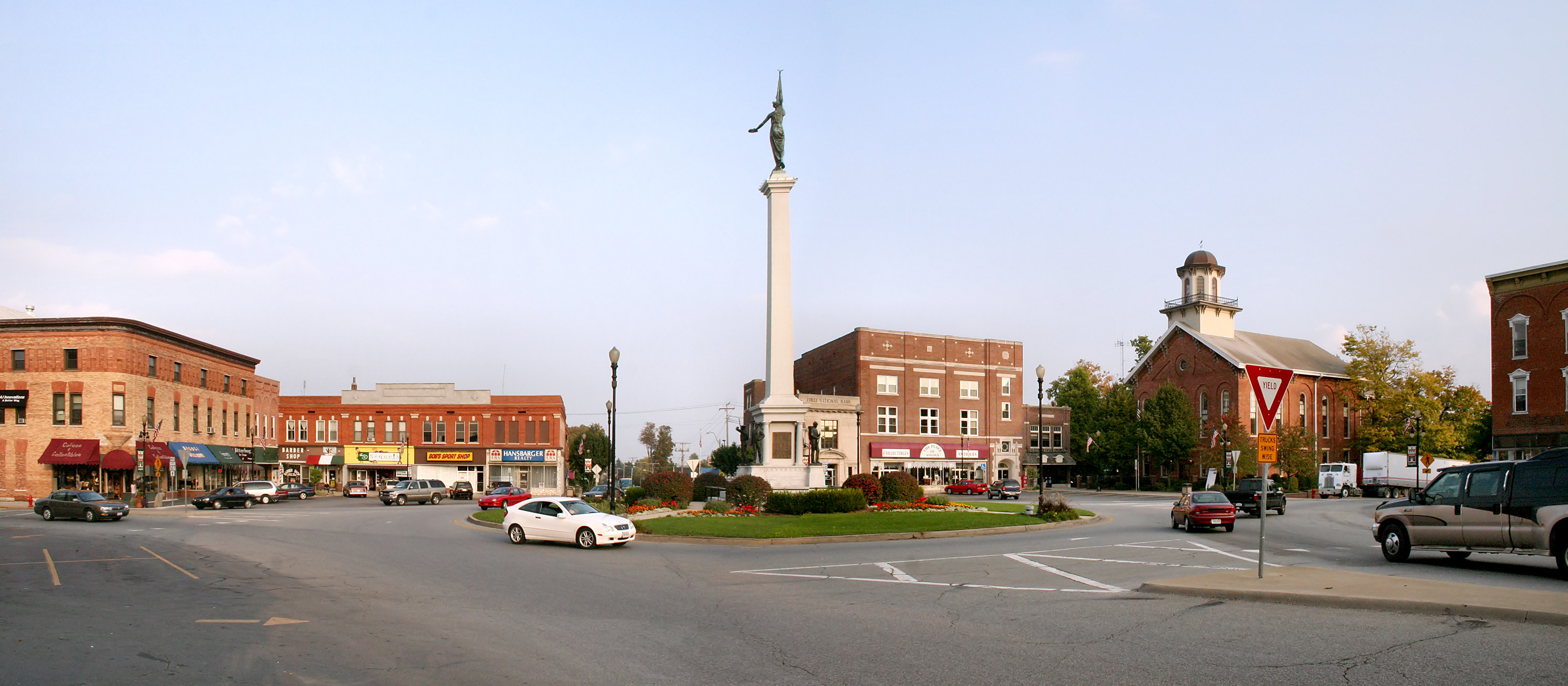
The roundabout at US 20 and SR 127

US 20 heads east from Elkhart toward Middlebury, as a four-lane roadway with a center turn lane. The road has an intersection with SR 15 south of Bristol. After the intersection with SR 15, US 20 becomes a two-lane highway. The route passes through the southwest side of Middlebury. On the south side of Middlebury, the route has a traffic light at SR 13. The route becomes a four-lane divided highway just west of this intersection, and, soon, after the intersection, the road becomes a two-lane highway. From Middlebury, the route heads east toward LaGrange, passing through rural farmland in eastern Elkhart County and western LaGrange County. On the way to LaGrange, the route passes through an intersection with SR 5 just south of Shipshewana. The route heads east toward downtown LaGrange, having an intersection with SR 9. The route heads east through rural farmland in eastern LaGrange County and western Steuben County. The route enters Angola and has an interchange with I-69. The road continues east into downtown Angola, passing just to the north of Trine University. At the center of downtown, US 20 has a roundabout with SR 127 (Old US 27). After going through the east side of Angola, the route continues east toward Ohio. In rural eastern Steuben County, the route passes through farmland and has an intersection with the northern terminus of SR 1. Just west of the Ohio state line, the route passes under the Indiana Toll Road (I-80/I-90).

== History ==
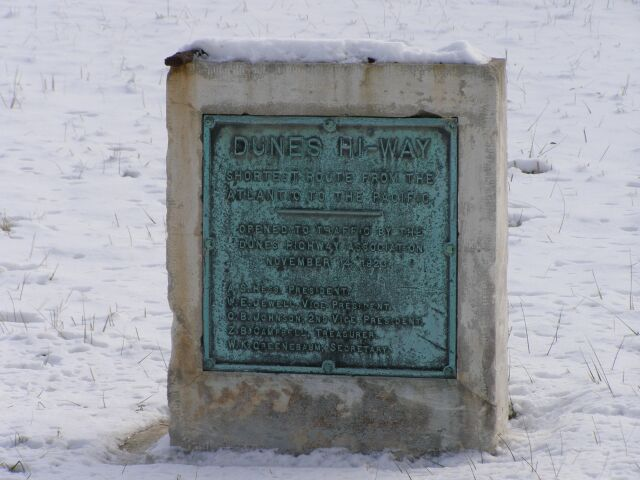
Dunes Highway Historic marker at US 12 and SR 49

An important road from 1900 to 1910 was the Old Chicago Road, later renamed the Dunes Highway. The Dunes Highway Association engineers envisioned the Dunes Highway a "state of the art" 40-foot-wide (12 m) concrete highway with a 100-foot (30 m) right-of-way. In August 1919, Commission director H.L. Wright tentatively designated the Dunes Highway as SR 43, to be 20 feet (6.1 m) wide. Narrower than anticipated, the new concrete highway was still superior to most Indiana roads, which, in the mid-1920s, were gravel or dirt with paved sections only between the larger towns. Dunes Highway construction began in 1922 under the guidance of Gary contractor Ingwald Moe and construction engineer Ezra Sensibar.

US 20 was part of the first alignment of the Lincoln Highway in 1913 from the current SR 2 in Rolling Prairie to Elkhart, where the Lincoln Highway turned southeast on to current US 33. In 1926, the Lincoln Highway was rerouted to US 30.

Between 1917 and 1926, the route from Illinois state line to Michigan City was SR 43; this route was named Dunes Highway. At this time, US 20 from Michigan City to Ohio state line was SR 25. When US 20 was signed in Indiana, in 1926, the section from Illinois state line to Michigan City was concurrent with US 12 and the Dunes Highway. In the early 1930s, US 20 from the Illinois state line to Michigan City was moved to its current route. In the mid-1970s, US 20 Byp. went from US 31 to US 20, on the southwest side of South Bend. Until 1998, US 20 went through downtown Elkhart and South Bend. When the state of Indiana built the St. Joseph Valley Parkway, the route downtown was decommissioned.

In 2005, a series of sharp curves around Rainbow Lake were removed; the curves were located six miles (9.7 km) west of LaGrange. A new straight roadway was built, from just east of SR 5 to just east of CR 600 West.

== Future ==
INDOT plans to make US 20 a four-lane highway with a center turn lane from just east of SR 15 to SR 13. The project will be done in a two different phases. Phase one will be from SR 15 to Elkhart CR 35, and phase two will be from CR 35 to SR 13. The final phase is scheduled for completion around 2020.

== Major intersections ==
County	Location	mi	km	Exit	Destinations	Notes
Lake	Hammond	0.000	0.000		US 12 west / US 20 west / US 41 north / LMCT (Indianapolis Boulevard) – Chicago	Continuation into Illinois
Lake	Hammond	0.057– 0.364	0.092– 0.586		I-90 Toll east / Indiana Toll Road east to I-80 / I-94 / US 6 / SR 51	Exit 0 on I-90 / Toll Road
Lake	Hammond	1.314	2.115		US 41 south – Hammond	Eastern end of US 41 concurrency
Lake	East Chicago	4.356	7.010		Riley Road	To SR 912
Lake	East Chicago	5.107	8.219		US 12 / LMCT east (Columbus Drive)	Eastern end of US 12 concurrency
Lake	East Chicago	5.809	9.349		SR 312	
Lake	East Chicago–Hammond line	7.131	11.476		SR 152 south – Hammond	
Lake	Hammond	8.127	13.079		Kennedy Avenue	Interchange
Lake	Hammond–Gary line	9.425– 9.771	15.168– 15.725		SR 912 south (Cline Avenue) / US 12 west / LMCT	Western end of US 12 concurrency; exit 8 on SR 912
Lake	Gary	14.737	23.717		SR 53 south (Broadway) – Merrillville	
Lake	Gary				I-65 south – Indianapolis	Northern terminus of I-65
Lake	Gary	16.376– 16.392	26.355– 26.380		I-90 Toll / Indiana Toll Road to I-80 / I-94 east	Exit 17 on I-90 / Toll Road
Lake	Gary	17.668	28.434		US 12 / LMCT east – Michigan City	Eastern end of US 12 concurrency
Lake	Lake Station	19.880	31.994		SR 51 south – Lake Station, Hobart	
Porter	Portage	23.504	37.826		SR 249 north (Crisman Road)	Southern terminus of SR 249
Porter	Burns Harbor	26.067	41.951		SR 149 (Max Mochal) – South Haven	
Porter	Burns Harbor–Porter line	26.960– 27.213	43.388– 43.795		I-94 – Chicago, Detroit	Exits 22A-B on I-94
Porter	Porter	30.306	48.773		SR 49 – Valparaiso, Porter	Cloverleaf interchange
Porter	Town of Pines	36.452	58.664		SR 520 north (Maple Street)	Southern terminus of SR 520
LaPorte	Michigan City	39.934	64.268		US 421 south – Westville	Northern terminus of US 421
LaPorte	Michigan City	43.861	70.587		SR 212 north to US 12; Michigan Boulevard – Michigan City	Interchange; US 20 departs via exit ramps, SR 212 continues northerly; southern terminus of SR 212
LaPorte	Springfield Township	44.866– 45.009	72.205– 72.435		I-94 – Chicago, Detroit	Exits 40A-B on I-94
LaPorte	Springfield Township	45.121	72.615		US 35 south – LaPorte	Northern terminus of US 35
LaPorte	Springville	48.682	78.346		SR 39 – LaPorte, New Buffalo	
LaPorte	Rolling Prairie	56.492	90.915		SR 2 – LaPorte, South Bend	Roundabout interchange
LaPorte	Rolling Prairie	57.013	91.754		Lincoln Highway (Oak Knoll Road)	
St. Joseph	South Bend	70.479	113.425	254	US 31 north (St. Joseph Valley Parkway north) / US 20 Bus. / Lincoln Highway to I-80 Toll / I-90 Toll / Indiana Toll Road – Niles MI. Lincoln Way	Western end of US 31 concurrency; US 20 east joins the St. Joseph Valley Parkway
St. Joseph	Portage Township	72.835	117.217	73	SR 2 west Western Avenue	Eastern terminus of SR 2
St. Joseph	Portage Township	74.524	119.935	75	Mayflower Road	No westbound exit to southbound Mayflower Road or eastbound entrance from northbound Mayflower Road
St. Joseph	South Bend	76.058	122.403	76	SR 23 – South Bend, North Liberty	
St. Joseph	South Bend	78.829	126.863	79	US 31 south / Michigan Street – Plymouth, Indianapolis	Cloverleaf interchange; eastern end of US 31 concurrency
St. Joseph	South Bend	80.714	129.897	80	Ironwood Road	Single point urban interchange
St. Joseph	Penn Township	82.746	133.167	82	SR 331 south (Bremen Highway)	Western end of SR 331 concurrency
St. Joseph	Penn Township	84.750	136.392	84	SR 331 north / Elm Road	Eastern end of SR 331 concurrency
Elkhart	Elkhart	92.058	148.153	—	SR 19 – Wakarusa, Nappanee, Elkhart	
Elkhart	Elkhart	95.578	153.818	—	US 33 south / Main Street – Elkhart, Goshen	Northern terminus of US 33
Elkhart	Elkhart	98.311	158.216	—	Old US 20 – Elkhart	No eastbound exit
Elkhart	Elkhart	98.671	158.796	—	CR 17 to I-80 Toll / I-90 Toll / Indiana Toll Road	Eastern terminus of the St. Joseph Valley Parkway
Elkhart	Goshen	102.096	164.308		SR 15 – Goshen, Bristol	
Elkhart	Middlebury	108.453	174.538		SR 13 (Main Street) – Millersburg, Middlebury	
Lagrange	Shipshewana	114.945	184.986		SR 5 – Ligonier, Shipshewana	
Lagrange	Lagrange	124.626	200.566		SR 9 (Detroit Street) – Rome City, Lagrange	
Lagrange	Springfield Township	131.58	211.76		SR 3 – Kendallville, Mongo	
Steuben	Jackson Township	136.242	219.260		SR 327 – Garrett, Orland	
Steuben	Angola	143.095– 143.208	230.289– 230.471		I-69 – Fort Wayne, Lansing	Exit 348 on I-69
Steuben	Angola	145.669	234.432		SR 127 north / Wayne Street – Fremont	Roundabout; southern terminus of SR 127
Steuben	Scott Township	150.017	241.429		SR 1 south – Hamilton	Northern terminus of SR 1
Steuben	York Township	155.734	250.630		US 20 east – Toledo	Continuation into Ohio
1.000 mi = 1.609 km; 1.000 km = 0.621 mi: Concurrency terminus; Incomplete access; Tolled

== See also ==
- Indiana State Road 120

U.S. Route 20
Previous state: Illinois	Indiana	Next state: Ohio
