= IN-6 =

IN-6, IN 6, or IN6 may refer to:

- Indiana's 6th congressional district
- Indiana State Road 6
