= Indiana State Road 152 =

State highway in Indiana, United States

State Road 152
- Indianapolis Boulevard
- SR 152 highlighted in red

Route information
- Maintained by INDOT
- Length: 2.487 mi (4.002 km)
- Existed: 1938–present

Major junctions
- South end: I-80 / I-94 / US 6 / US 41 in Hammond
- North end: US 20 in Hammond

Location
- Country: United States
- State: Indiana
- Counties: Lake

Highway system
- Indiana State Highway System; Interstate; US; State; Scenic
← SR 149	→ SR 154

State Road 152 in the U.S. state of Indiana is a short connector highway in northwest Indiana.

== Route description ==
SR 152 serves as a connector route through Hammond between US 41 and US 20, traveling entirely along Indianapolis Boulevard. The route begins at a combination interchange with I-80/I-94/US 6/US 41 (Borman Expressway). After US 41 turns west onto the expressway from Indianapolis Boulevard, the roadway continues north in a straight direction, now carrying SR 152. North of the interchange, SR 152 serves the Purdue University Northwest (Hammond campus). North of 165th Street, the route begins to transition into an industrial area. The route first encounters a railroad crossing and then crosses above a railyard as a four-lane overpass. Shortly after the road descends to street level, SR 152 ends at an intersection with US 20 (Michigan Street). The roadway still continues north as part of US 20.

== History ==
SR 152 was once part of US 152 until that highway's decommissioning in 1938. The rest of US 152 is now US 52, US 231, and US 41.
