= Interstate 165 (Indiana) =

Canceled spur in Indianapolis

Interstate 165
- Proposed I-165 corridor highlighted in red

Route information
- Auxiliary route of I-65
- Length: 2.7 mi (4.3 km)
- Existed: June 6, 1978–July 30, 1981

Major junctions
- South end: I-65 / I-70 in Indianapolis
- North end: 38th Street in Indianapolis

Location
- Country: United States
- State: Indiana
- Counties: Marion

Highway system
- Interstate Highway System; Main; Auxiliary; Suffixed; Business; Future; Indiana State Highway System; Interstate; US; State; Scenic

Interstate 165 (I-165) was a proposed auxiliary Interstate Highway in the US state of Indiana. Its planned route would have taken it from the northern split of I-65 and I-70 to 38th Street, entirely within Indianapolis.

== History ==
I-165 was originally planned as a 2.7-mile-long (4.3 km) spur route between I-65 and 38th Street in Indianapolis. The proposal for I-165 came about after I-69 was cancelled between I-465 near Fishers and the northern interchange between I-65 and I-70. Originally, stub ramps were present at the interchange's former configuration; however, the interchange was reconfigured to better meet traffic demands in 2023 into 2024.

The freeway was added to the Interstate Highway System on June 6, 1978, using mileage available from withdrawals in other states. Acting Administrator Karl S. Bowers of the Federal Highway Administration (FHWA) stated that I-165 could not later be withdrawn under the provisions of 23 U.S.C. 103(e)(2) or 103(e)(4); mileage could only be withdrawn once and to permit redesignated mileage to be withdrawn would incur a second entitlement for substitute funds.

Sections 107(a)(1) and (b) of the Surface Transportation Assistance Act of 1978 prohibited any future Interstate additions or redesignations under 23 U.S.C. 103(e)(2) or 103(e)(4) after November 6, 1978. On August 25, 1980, Administrator John S. Hassell wrote the Indiana State Highway Commission rescinding the condition in Mr. Bowers's 1978 letter. The withdrawal of I-165 as a proposed highway was approved on July 30, 1981, in Administrator R. A. Barnhart's letter to Indiana Governor Robert D. Orr. On April 16, 1981, Governor Robert D. Orr and Mayor William H. Hudnut III submitted a joint request by the state of Indiana and the city of Indianapolis for the withdrawal of I-165 from the Interstate Highway System. Federal Highway Administrator R.A. Barnhart and Urban Mass Transportation Administrator Arthur E. Teele approved the withdrawal under the provisions of 23 U.S.C. 103(e)(4) on July 30, 1981.
