= Ports of Indiana-Burns Harbor =

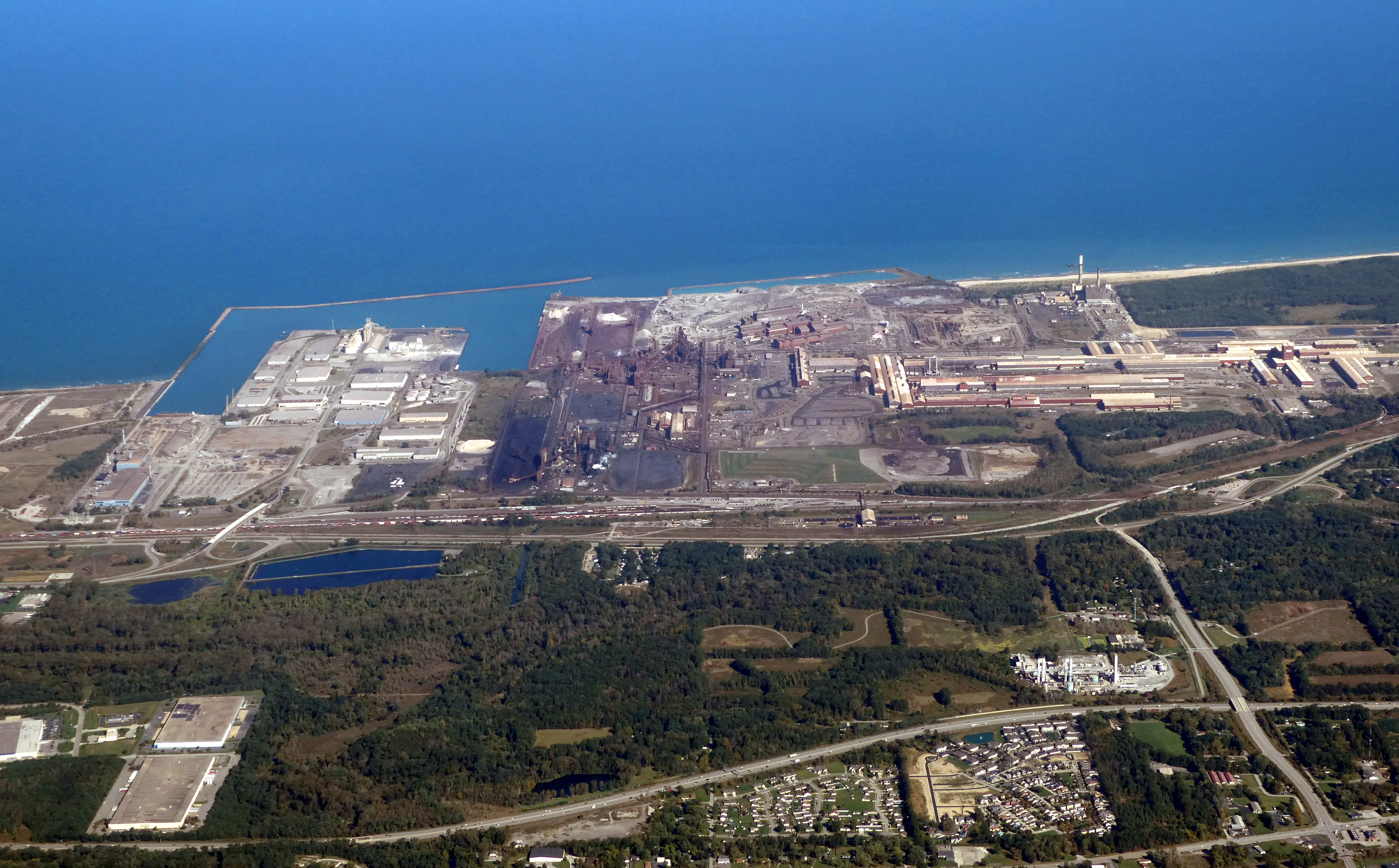
- Aerial view in 2024
- Interactive map of Ports of Indiana-Burns Harbor
- Location within Indiana

Location
- Coordinates: 41.644°N 87.155°W

Statistics
- Website https://www.portsofindiana.com/

Ports of Indiana-Burns Harbor is an active maritime port owned by the State of Indiana. The state legislature created the Indiana Port Commission in 1961 to research and act upon opening maritime ports on Indiana's Lake Michigan shoreline as well as the Ohio River.

Ports of Indiana-Burns Harbor opened in 1970 and is located on Lake Michigan at the intersection of U.S. Route 12 and Indiana State Road 249. The primary work done in the adjacent area is the manufacturing of steel at steel mills, and the roster of port tenants is dominated by steel processing companies, although agricultural and other businesses are present. The port is divided between the municipalities of Burns Harbor and Portage.

Construction of Ports of Indiana-Burns Harbor was extremely controversial, with conservationists fighting to preserve a segment of the Indiana Dunes that occupied the site of the future port. The port and its steel mills were constructed on top of what was once the Central Dunes region of the Indiana Dunes and site of some of the hanggliding experiments carried out by a crew led by pioneer aviator Octave Chanute.

Authorization of the Indiana Dunes National Park, which borders Ports of Indiana-Burns Harbor on three sides, was part of a political compromise that also involved the construction of the port.

== Port economy ==
Ports of Indiana-Burns Harbor, as of 2024, is surrounded by three extensive industrial plants:

- Gary Works-Midwest Plant, a unit of the U.S. Steel Corporation.
- The Burns Harbor steel works of Cleveland-Cliffs (formerly ArcelorMittal), originally constructed by the former Bethlehem Steel Corporation.
- The Northern Indiana Public Service Bailly generating station owned by NiSource, which is currently idle but maintained in a "stand-by" state if needed.

== Port history ==
When Bethlehem Steel and advocates for preservation of the Central Dunes crossed swords in Congress in the early 1960s, the steel company won. Two key arguments used by Bethlehem in their successful campaign were increased national security from the production of American steel, and the creation of well-paid jobs in a field that was then dominated by the United Steelworkers union. Two arguments advanced by the people opposed to the project were that the mill could have easily been located directly east of Gary, in a less sensitive and strategic ecological zone, and that large infrastructure projects, which would amount to a tax subsidy, were needed to construct a mill in this area.

Making steel in the Burns Harbor area required support from the federal government because of the shallow waters of Lake Michigan offshore from the sand dunes. In order to make it possible for lake freighters to bring iron ore, coal, and limestone to the steel mills, extensive dredging and engineering work was necessary. This work linked the Little Calumet River to Lake Michigan via Burns Ditch (Portage Burns Waterway).

Congress, as part of the River and Harbor Act of 1965, instructed the Army Corps of Engineers to carry out the necessary work to create and maintain the artificial harbor that would become the Port of Indiana. In line with overall Great Lakes standards, the docking areas are dredged to a depth of at least 27 feet (8 m). The port is protected by 8,230 feet (2,510 m) of steel and rubblemound breakwaters.

In addition to the federal help, the state of Indiana showed its support for the Port of Indiana project by constructing two roads, State Road 149 and State Road 249, to serve the new industrial area. In 2024 the State Road 249 bridge over U.S. Route 12 was twinned, potentially doubling the capacity of ocean-going cargo at the port.

== Adjacent recreational use ==
Ports of Indiana-Burns Harbor sits adjacent to the Burns Waterway Small Boat Harbor, a 5,540-foot (1,690 m)-long canal, dredged to a depth of 6 feet (1.8 m), extending inland from Lake Michigan to south of U.S. Highway 12. It is located west of Burns Waterway Harbor, at 41.633°N 87.177°W. This boat harbor provides access to the inland Portage Marina and what was to be Marina Shores, a private, 300-boat marina/condominium complex. The marina is successful, but the housing development failed in the early stages of development.

It is commonly misunderstood that Ports of Indiana-Burns Harbor owns the Burns Waterway and harbor, but it is actually maintained by Army Corps of Engineers. As of 2024, the state-owned port is a "restricted area" and the public is not admitted within most of the port area, with the exception of the port office.

== Incidents adjacent to the port ==
In August 2019, ArcelorMittal inadvertently vented elevated levels of ammonia and cyanide from a Burns Harbor blast furnace into the Little Calumet River. Hundreds of fish were killed. A public fishing pier once located at the north end of the port was temporarily closed to the public. In February 2022, Cleveland-Cliffs (which had acquired the mill from ArcelorMittal) agreed to a $3 million settlement based on the incident.
