= Indiana State Road 149 =

Highway in Indiana

State Road 149
- SR 149 highlighted in red

Route information
- Maintained by INDOT
- Length: 8.698 mi (13.998 km)

Major junctions
- South end: SR 130 near Valparaiso
- US 6 in South Haven; US 20 in Burns Harbor
- North end: US 12 in Burns Harbor

Location
- Country: United States
- State: Indiana
- Counties: Porter

Highway system
- Indiana State Highway System; Interstate; US; State; Scenic
← SR 148	→ SR 152

State Road 149 (SR 149) is a part of the Indiana State Road that runs between Valparaiso and Burns Harbor in the US state of Indiana. The 8.73 miles (14.05 km) of SR 149 that lie within Indiana serve as a minor highway. No section of the highway is listed on the National Highway System. Various sections of the road are rural two-lane and urban four-lane undivided highways, passing through farmland and residential properties.

== Route description ==
SR 149 northbound entering the Indiana Dunes National Park

SR 149 begins at an intersection with SR 130, just north of the Chicago Fort Wayne and Eastern Railroad and Norfolk Southern Railroad tracks. The road heads north as a two-lane highway, passing through rural farmland with some houses. The highway has traffic lights at U.S. Route 6 (US 6). The route crosses under the Indiana Toll Road and has an at-grade crossing with the CSX Transportation railroad tracks. The road crosses another set of CSX Railroad tracks and has a traffic light at US 20. North of US 20, the highway becomes a four-lane undivided highway, with a wide median. The route crosses over Interstate 94 (I–94). The route curves northwest, becoming a four-lane undivided highway and having an intersection with US 12.

No segment of State Road 149 in Indiana that is included in the National Highway System (NHS). The NHS is a network of highways that are identified as being most important for the economy, mobility and defense of the nation. The highway is maintained by the Indiana Department of Transportation (INDOT) like all other state roads in the state. The department tracks the traffic volumes along all state roads as a part of its maintenance responsibilities using a metric called average annual daily traffic (AADT). This measurement is a calculation of the traffic level along a segment of roadway for any average day of the year. In 2010, INDOT figured that lowest traffic levels were 5,299 vehicles and 94 commercial vehicles used the highway daily between US 20 and US 12. The peak traffic volumes were 12,783 vehicles and 491 commercial vehicles AADT along the section of SR 149 between Lenburg Road and US 20.

== Major intersections ==
The entire route is in Porter County.

Location	mi	km	Destinations	Notes
Center Township	0.000	0.000	SR 130 west / Lincolnway – Valparaiso	Southern terminus of SR 149
South Haven	3.963	6.378	US 6 – Gary, Westville	
Burns Harbor	7.507	12.081	US 20 – Gary, Michigan City	
Burns Harbor	8.698	13.998	US 12 / LMCT	Northern terminus of SR 149
1.000 mi = 1.609 km; 1.000 km = 0.621 mi

== See also ==
- Indiana State Road 49
- Indiana State Road 249
