= Miller Town Hall =

Historic civic building in Indiana, United States

- U.S. National Register of Historic Places
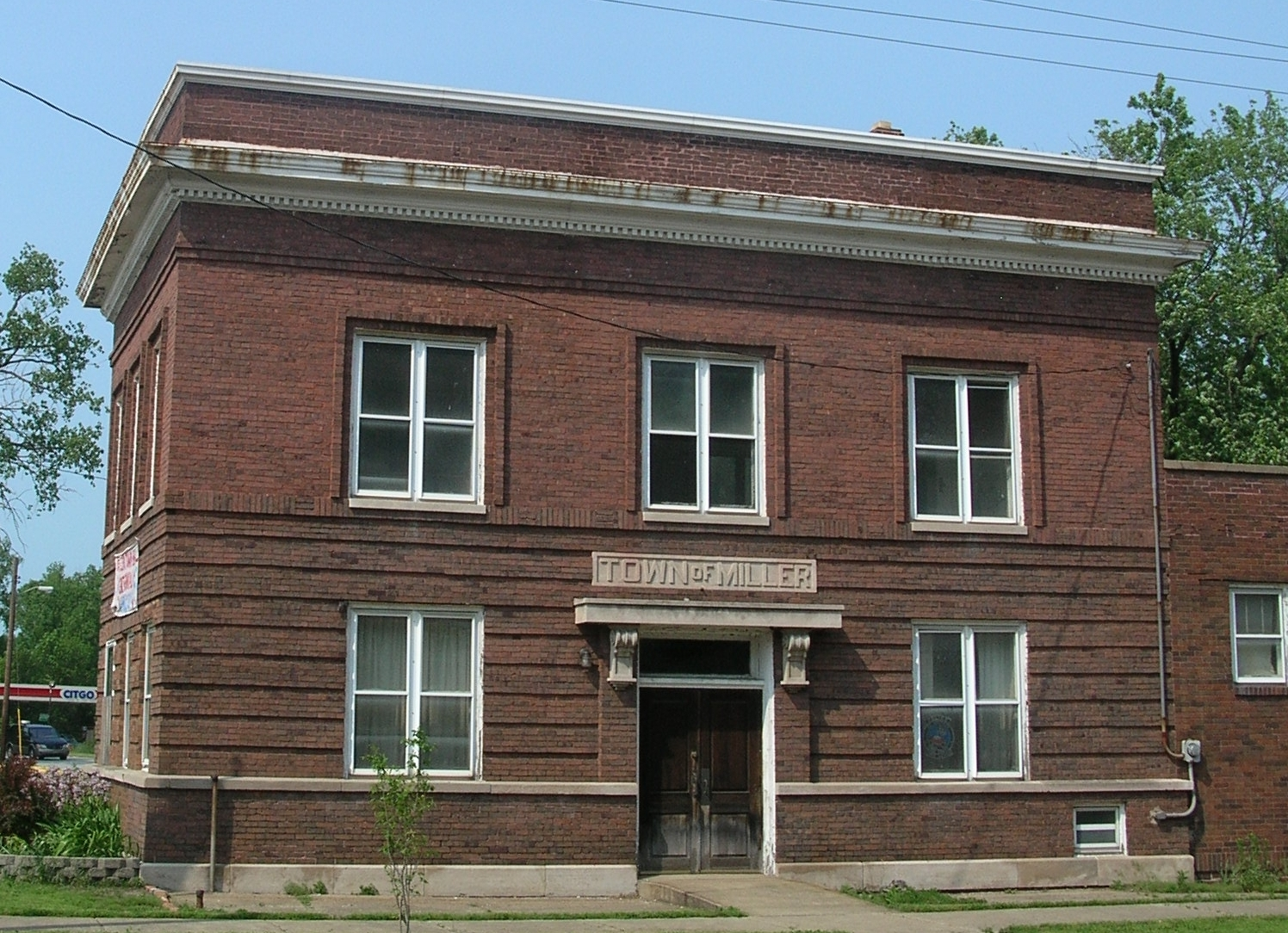
- The Miller Town Hall in spring 2011

- Location within Indiana Location within the United States
- Location: Grand Blvd. & Miller Ave., Gary, Indiana
- Coordinates: 41°36′2″N 87°15′41″W
- Built: 1911
- Architect: VerPlank, J.J.
- NRHP reference No.: 78000038
- Added to NRHP: 1978

The Miller Town Hall is a two-story brick building in the Miller Beach community in Gary, Indiana, in the United States. It was constructed to serve as the administrative building for the town of Miller, incorporated in 1907, and was used for that purpose until Miller's annexation into Gary in 1918. It later served as a fire station through much of the 20th century, and is currently used for storage only.

The Miller Town Hall was added to the National Register of Historic Places in 1978.

Although the Town Hall is owned by the city, the grounds are landscaped and maintained by local volunteers, including members of the Miller Historical Society and Miller Garden Club. In 2011, the Town Hall became a flashpoint of controversy when the city government attempted to stop neighborhood volunteers from removing broken concrete from the front of the building. Although the work went forward, lead volunteer James Nowacki was charged with creating a public nuisance.
