= Interstate 94 in Indiana =

Road section in Indiana, United States

Interstate 94
- I-94 highlighted in red

Route information
- Maintained by INDOT
- Length: 45.770 mi (73.660 km)
- NHS: Entire route

Major junctions
- West end: I-80 / I-94 / US 6 at the Illinois state line in Munster
- US 41 / SR 152 in Hammond; SR 912 in Gary; I-65 in Gary; US 6 in Lake Station; I-80 Toll / I-90 Toll / Indiana Toll Road in Lake Station; US 20 near Michigan City
- East end: I-94 at the Michigan state line near New Buffalo, MI

Location
- Country: United States
- State: Indiana
- Counties: Lake, Porter, LaPorte

Highway system
- Interstate Highway System; Main; Auxiliary; Suffixed; Business; Future; Indiana State Highway System; Interstate; US; State; Scenic
← I-90 Toll	→ SR 101

Interstate 94 (I-94) is a part of the Interstate Highway System that runs from Billings, Montana, to Port Huron, Michigan. I-94 enters Indiana from Illinois in the west, in Munster, and runs generally eastward through Hammond, Gary, and Portage, before entering Michigan northeast of Michigan City. The Interstate runs for approximately 45.8 miles (73.7 km) through the state. The landscape traversed by I-94 includes urban areas of Northwest Indiana, wooded areas, and farmland. The section of I-94 between the Illinois state line and Lake Station is named the Frank Borman Expressway.

== Route description ==
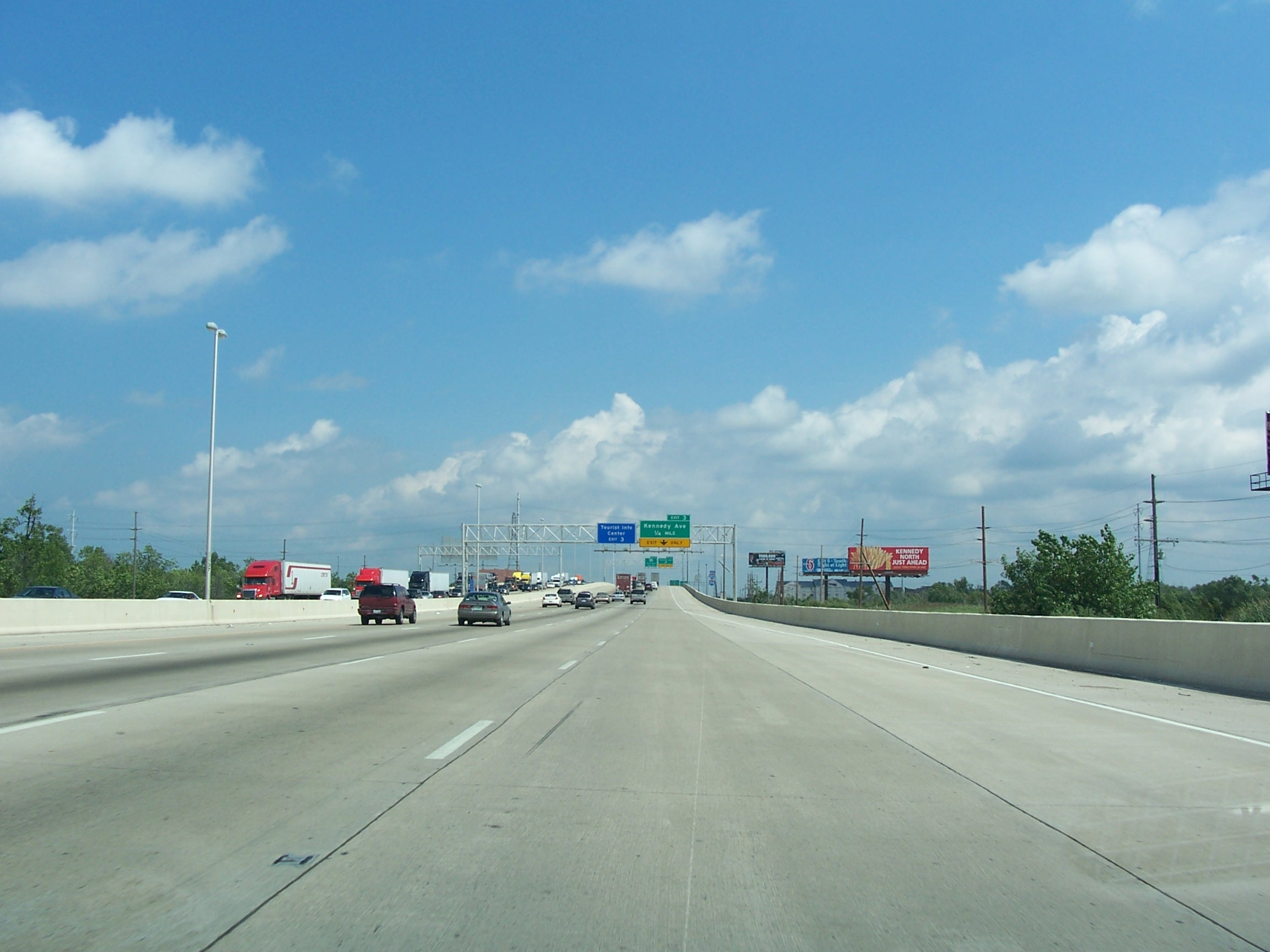
The Borman Expressway in Hammond, approaching exit 3

I-94 enters Indiana from Illinois running concurrently with I-80 and US Highway 6 (US 6) on the Borman Expressway, in Munster. The freeway heads toward the east as a 10-lane Interstate, quickly entering the city of Hammond. The road has an interchange with Calumet Avenue, which US 41 is concurrent with toward the north of the interchange. East of the Calumet interchange is an interchange with Indianapolis Boulevard, which carries US 41 south of this interchange and State Road 152 (SR 152) to the north. East of Indianapolis Boulevard, the Interstate passes over the Norfolk Southern Railway Kanakee belt, before having an interchange with Kennedy Avenue. After Kennedy Avenue, the freeway passes to the north of industrial properties, before having an interchange at SR 912, also known as Cline Avenue. The stretch of the highway between Kennedy Avenue and SR 912 is one of the most heavily traveled in the state, with annual average daily traffic (AADT) of 163,912 vehicles according to a 2010 study. At the interchange with Cline Avenue, the Borman Expressway becomes an eight-lane Interstate; it also leaves Hammond and enters the city of Gary.

East of SR 912, the Interstate has an overpass over railroad tracks, before having an interchange with Burr Street. After Burr Street, the highway passes near woodland, as a 10-lane Interstate. The freeway has an interchange with both Grant Street and Broadway. The Interstate has an interchange with I-65. Central Avenue has an incomplete interchange, eastbound exit and westbound entrance, with the Interstate that is accessed through ramps at I-65 exit. East of Central Avenue the freeway becomes a six-lane Interstate passing near wooded areas, with farmland. The highway enters Lake Station, and US 6 leaves I-94. East of the interchange with US 6, the Borman Expressway has an interchange with the Indiana Toll Road. I-80 leaves I-94 and heads east along the toll road. The name "Borman Expressway" does not apply eastward beyond the toll road interchange. The freeway passes over the toll road, before leaving Lake Station and entering Portage.

In Portage, the Interstate passes over US 20 and begins to parallel US 20, before having an interchange with SR 249. East of SR 249, the highway leaves Portage and enters Burns Harbor, before passing under SR 149. I-94 has a cloverleaf interchange with US 20, before entering Porter. While passing through Porter, the highway passes over the Norfolk Southern Chicago Line. After Porter, the road enters Chesterton and has an interchange with SR 49. East of SR 49, the freeway leaves Chesterton, entering rural Porter County before entering LaPorte County. The Interstate has an interchange with US 421 just south of Michigan City. The road curves to the northeast, bypassing Michigan City to the southeast, having an interchange with US 20. After US 20, I-94 passes over a Chicago South Shore and South Bend Railroad track, before leaving the Michigan City area and entering Michigan. The segment of freeway between US 20 and the Michigan state line has the lowest AADT on I-94 in the state of Indiana, at 37,179 vehicles.

== History ==
The expressway now known as the Borman was originally known as the Tri-State Highway, and construction of the expressway began in 1949. The designation went through the Kingery Expressway and eventually linked with the Tri-State Tollway in Illinois. It was originally designated SR 420 in Indiana. US 6 diverged at Calumet Avenue south and ran on Calumet Avenue and Ridge Road.

At various times, the expressway was extended from Indianapolis Boulevard to Burr Street, then to Georgia Street east of Broadway, and eventually to the toll road. Some time after the enactment of the Interstate Highway System, the expressway was designated as I-80, I-90, and I-294, and the I-94 designation was applied to the Indiana Toll Road west of where its interchange with the Borman was eventually built. The expressways were renumbered around 1965 to avoid the implication that through traffic must change roads to stay on I-90 or I-94, resulting in I-90 being moved to the Indiana Toll Road, I-94 being moved to the Borman, and I-294 being cut back to the Tri-State Tollway and no longer entering Indiana. US 6 was extended along the Borman to Ripley Street at that time (its earlier alignment in this area became US 6 Business). The Borman Expressway is named after Frank Borman, commander of the Gemini 7 and Apollo 8 space missions, who was born in Gary.

The eastern section of I-94 in Indiana was completed last, after the nearby Michigan section had been completed, leading to what was called in the interim the "Cornfield Roadblock".

=== Reconstruction ===
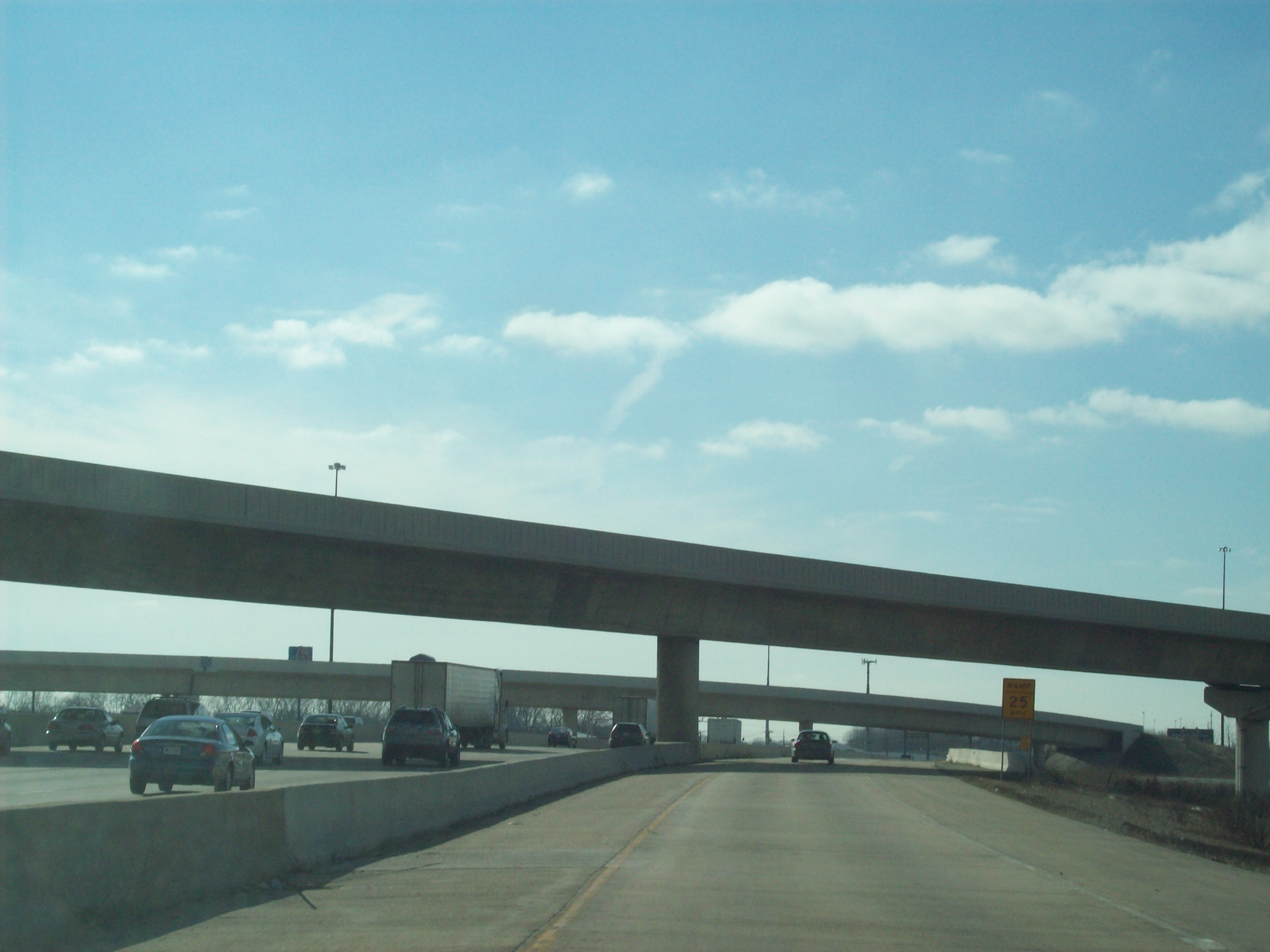
Borman Expressway three-level interchange at Cline Avenue

Reconstruction of the Borman commenced in 2004. The reconstruction of both the Kingery and Borman expressways aimed to significantly reduce the delays encountered on the highway. The reconstructed portion of the Borman is eight lanes wide, with additional collector–distributor lanes between interchanges. Construction between the Illinois state line and exit 11 (I-65 south ramp to Indianapolis) was completed in 2007. The I-65 Interchange Modification Project continued into 2009, including replacing the pavement of the Borman Expressway to Central Avenue.

The Borman Expressway and Cline Avenue interchange is a partial cloverleaf interchange. Two flyover ramps allow southbound Cline Avenue traffic to merge onto the eastbound Borman Expressway, and northbound Cline Avenue traffic to merge onto the westbound Borman Expressway. The remaining ramps utilize the cloverleaf design.

=== Flooding ===
On Saturday, September 13, 2008, at approximately 9:00 am CDT, all lanes of the Borman Expressway in both directions at Kennedy Avenue in Hammond were closed by the Indiana Department of Transportation (INDOT) and the Indiana State Police due to severe flooding from the Little Calumet River. A levee breach, thanks to torrential rains from the remnants of Hurricane Ike, reportedly caused water from the river to cascade across all lanes to a depth of nearly five feet (1.5 m) under the Kennedy Avenue overpass. The expressway remained shut down in both directions until the following Wednesday, September 17, 2008. There had also been flooding in August 2007, and various measures have been undertaken to prevent future occurrences.

== Exit list ==
County	Location	mi	km	Exit	Destinations	Notes
Lake	Munster	0.000	0.000		I-80 west / I-94 west / US 6 west (Kingery Expressway) – Des Moines, Chicago	Continuation into Illinois; western end of the Borman Expressway
Lake	Hammond	0.875	1.408	1	US 41 north (Calumet Avenue)	Western end of US 41 concurrency
Lake	Hammond	2.384	3.837	2	US 41 south / SR 152 north (Indianapolis Boulevard)	Eastern end of US 41 concurrency; serves Purdue University Northwest Hammond Campus
Lake	Hammond	3.346– 3.358	5.385– 5.404	3	Kennedy Avenue	Serves Visitors' Center
Lake	Gary	4.908	7.899	5	SR 912 (Cline Avenue)	Serves Gary/Chicago International Airport
Lake	Gary	6.448	10.377	6	Burr Street	
Lake	Gary	8.890	14.307	9	Grant Street	
Lake	Gary	9.915	15.957	10	SR 53 (Broadway)	Serves Indiana University Northwest
Lake	Gary	10.856– 11.857	17.471– 19.082	11; 12	I-65 to Indiana Toll Road (I-90 Toll) – Indianapolis, Chicago	I-65 exits 259A-B; signed as exits 11 (south) & 12 (north) eastbound and exit 12 westbound
Lake	Lake Station	12.749	20.518	13	Central Avenue	Eastbound exit (shares ramp with I-65 north, Exit 12) and westbound entrance
Lake	Lake Station	15.156	24.391	15A	US 6 east / SR 51 – Lake Station	Eastern end of US 6 concurrency
Lake	Lake Station	15.666– 15.937	25.212– 25.648	15B	I-80 Toll east / I-90 Toll / Indiana Toll Road to Chicago Skyway west – Toledo, Chicago	Eastern end of I-80 concurrency and the Borman Expressway; I-90 / Toll Road exit 21
Porter	Portage	18.955	30.505	19	SR 249 – Port of Indiana, Portage	
Porter	Porter	22.356	35.978	22	US 20 – Burns Harbor, Porter	Signed as exits 22A (west) and 22B (east)
Porter	Chesterton	25.982	41.814	26	SR 49 – Chesterton, Valparaiso	Signed as exits 26A (south) and 26B (north); serves Indiana Dunes National Park and Indiana Dunes State Park
LaPorte	Coolspring Township	34.586	55.661	34	US 421 – Westville, Michigan City	Signed as exits 34A (south) and 34B (north)
LaPorte	Springfield Township	39.934	64.268	40	US 20 to US 35 – South Bend, Michigan City, La Porte	Signed as exits 40A (east) and 40B (west)
LaPorte	Springfield Township	45.770	73.660		I-94 east – Detroit	Continuation into Michigan
1.000 mi = 1.609 km; 1.000 km = 0.621 mi: Concurrency terminus; Incomplete access; Tolled

== See also ==
Interstate 94
Previous state: Illinois	Indiana	Next state: Michigan
