= Burns Harbor, Indiana =

- Town
- Town of Burns Harbor
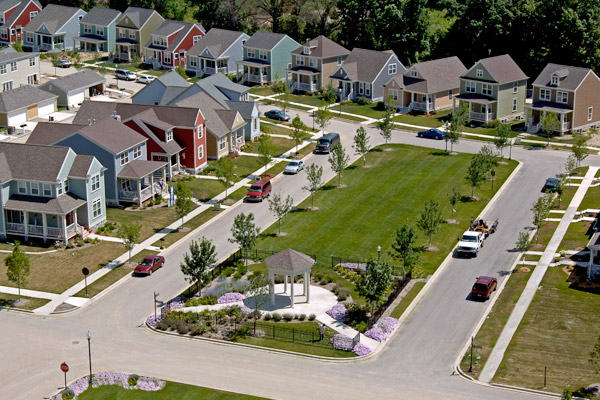

- Seal Logo

- Location of Burns Harbor in Porter County, Indiana.
- Coordinates: 41°37′43″N 87°07′28″W
- Country: United States
- State: Indiana
- County: Porter
- Township: Westchester

Area
  - Total: 6.44 sq mi (16.67 km^{2})
  - Land: 6.44 sq mi (16.67 km^{2})
  - Water: 0 sq mi (0.00 km^{2})
- Elevation: 630 ft (190 m)

Population (2020)
  - Total: 2,055
  - Density: 319.3/sq mi (123.27/km^{2})
- Time zone: UTC-6 (CST)
  - Summer (DST): UTC-5 (CDT)
- ZIP code: 46304
- Area code: 219
- FIPS code: 18-09370
- GNIS feature ID: 2396621
- Website: www.burnsharbor-in.gov

Burns Harbor is a town in Westchester Township, Porter County, Indiana, United States on the shores of Lake Michigan in Northwest Indiana. It is part of the Chicago metropolitan area. As of the 2020 census, Burns Harbor had a population of 2,055. Burns Harbor is located adjacent to the Indiana Dunes, an area that conservationists have fought hard to preserve.

== History ==
Burns Harbor was founded in 1966. The town took its name from a local port which was named for the harbor's promoter Randall W. Burns.

== Geography ==
According to the 2010 census, Burns Harbor has a total area of 6.78 square miles (17.56 km^{2}), of which 6.66 square miles (17.25 km^{2}) (or 98.23%) is land and 0.12 square miles (0.31 km^{2}) (or 1.77%) is water.

== Demographics ==
Historical population
Census	Pop.	Note	%±
1970	1,284		—
1980	920		−28.3%
1990	786		−14.6%
2000	766		−2.5%
2010	1,156		50.9%
2020	2,055		77.8%
Source: US Census Bureau

=== 2020 census ===
As of the 2020 census, Burns Harbor had a population of 2,055. The median age was 35.9 years. 27.2% of residents were under the age of 18 and 11.7% of residents were 65 years of age or older. For every 100 females there were 98.7 males, and for every 100 females age 18 and over there were 101.9 males age 18 and over.

100.0% of residents lived in urban areas, while 0.0% lived in rural areas.

There were 813 households in Burns Harbor, of which 35.7% had children under the age of 18 living in them. Of all households, 49.1% were married-couple households, 22.1% were households with a male householder and no spouse or partner present, and 20.9% were households with a female householder and no spouse or partner present. About 27.3% of all households were made up of individuals and 8.6% had someone living alone who was 65 years of age or older.

There were 863 housing units, of which 5.8% were vacant. The homeowner vacancy rate was 0.7% and the rental vacancy rate was 9.3%.

Racial composition as of the 2020 census
Race	Number	Percent
White	1,724	83.9%
Black or African American	85	4.1%
American Indian and Alaska Native	3	0.1%
Asian	27	1.3%
Native Hawaiian and Other Pacific Islander	1	0.0%
Some other race	75	3.6%
Two or more races	140	6.8%
Hispanic or Latino (of any race)	230	11.2%

=== 2010 census ===
As of the census of 2010, there were 1,156 people, 456 households, and 305 families living in the town. The population density was 173.3 inhabitants per square mile (66.9/km^{2}). There were 495 housing units at an average density of 74.2 per square mile (28.6/km^{2}). The racial makeup of the town was 95.4% White, 1.8% African American, 0.3% Native American, 0.3% Asian, 1.1% from other races, and 1.1% from two or more races. Hispanic or Latino of any race were 5.8% of the population.

There were 456 households, of which 37.3% had children under the age of 18 living with them, 51.5% were married couples living together, 10.3% had a female householder with no husband present, 5.0% had a male householder with no wife present, and 33.1% were non-families. 26.1% of all households were made up of individuals, and 7.4% had someone living alone who was 65 years of age or older. The average household size was 2.54 and the average family size was 3.10.

The median age in the town was 34.6 years. 26.2% of residents were under the age of 18; 6.4% were between the ages of 18 and 24; 31% were from 25 to 44; 25.6% were from 45 to 64; and 10.6% were 65 years of age or older. The gender makeup of the town was 50.8% male and 49.2% female.

=== 2000 census ===
As of the census of 2000, there were 766 people, 303 households, and 219 families living in the town. The population density was 112.1 inhabitants per square mile (43.3/km^{2}). There were 323 housing units at an average density of 47.3 per square mile (18.3/km^{2}). The racial makeup of the town was 94.26% White, 0.26% African American, 1.17% Native American, 1.04% Asian, 0.39% from other races, and 2.87% from two or more races. Hispanic or Latino of any race were 4.31% of the population.

There were 303 households, out of which 30.7% had children under the age of 18 living with them, 57.1% were married couples living together, 7.9% had a female householder with no husband present, and 27.4% were non-families. 22.8% of all households were made up of individuals, and 7.3% had someone living alone who was 65 years of age or older. The average household size was 2.53 and the average family size was 2.95.

In the town, the population was spread out, with 24.7% under the age of 18, 8.0% from 18 to 24, 28.5% from 25 to 44, 28.3% from 45 to 64, and 10.6% who were 65 years of age or older. The median age was 38 years. For every 100 females, there were 103.7 males. For every 100 females age 18 and over, there were 111.4 males.

The median income for a household in the town was $53,929, and the median income for a family was $57,188. Males had a median income of $43,393 versus $22,143 for females. The per capita income for the town was $23,344. About 4.2% of families and 6.3% of the population were below the poverty line, including 5.4% of those under age 18 and 5.6% of those age 65 or over.

== Infrastructure ==
=== Ports ===
- The Port of Indiana-Burns Harbor which includes an international shipping port and the Burns Waterway Small Boat Harbor for public access to Lake Michigan. The Port of Indiana-Burns Harbor is divided between Burns Harbor and Portage.
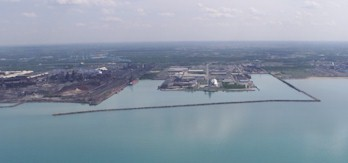
  View of the Port of Indiana-Burns Harbor as seen from Lake Michigan

=== Highways ===
- Interstate 80
- Interstate 90
- Interstate 94
- U.S. Route 12
- U.S. Route 20
- Indiana State Road 149

== Education ==
Burns Harbor is served by Duneland School Corporation (https://www.duneland.k12.in.us/) providing education for grades Kindergarten through 12, and is in close proximity to many higher education facilities including:

- Indiana University Northwest (IUN)
- Ivy Tech Community College of Indiana (Ivy Tech)
- Purdue University North Central (PNC)
- Purdue University Calumet (Purdue Cal)
- Valparaiso University (Valpo)
