= List of Interstate Highways in Indiana =

- Interstate Highway shields for Interstate 69 and Interstate 465
- Interstate Highways highlighted in red

Highway names
- Interstates: Interstate X (I-X)
- US Highways: U.S. Route X (US X)
- State: State Road X (SR X)

System links
- Indiana State Highway System; Interstate; US; State; Scenic

Interstate Highways are owned and maintained by the Indiana Department of Transportation (INDOT) unless it is a toll road.

The system was authorized by the Federal-Aid Highway Act of 1956, which provided federal funds for construction of limited access highways. Indiana's initial set of seven Interstate Highways were announced in September 1957.

== Primary Interstates ==
Number	Length (mi)	Length (km)	Southern or western terminus	Northern or eastern terminus	Formed	Removed	Notes
I-64	123.33	198.48	I-64 at Illinois state line west of Griffin	I-64 at Kentucky state line at New Albany	1956	current	
I-65	261.27	420.47	I-65 at Kentucky state line at Jeffersonville	US 12/US 20 in Gary	1956	current	Formerly the longest Interstate in Indiana
I-69	342	550	US 41/Veterans Memorial Parkway in Evansville	I-69 at Michigan state line northwest of Fremont	1956	current	Longest Interstate in Indiana
I-70	156.60	252.02	I-70 at Illinois state line west of Terre Haute	I-70 at Ohio state line at Richmond	1956	current	
I-74	171.54	276.07	I-74 at Illinois state line west of Covington	I-74 at Ohio state line at West Harrison	1960	current	
I-80	151.56	243.91	I-80/I-94 at Illinois state line at Munster	I-80/I-90 at Ohio state line east of Angola	1956	current	Indiana Toll Road from I-80/I-90/I-94 split in NW Indiana to Ohio state line
I-90	156.28	251.51	I-90 at Illinois state line in Hammond	I-80/I-90 at Ohio state line east of Angola	1956	current	Indiana Toll Road
I-94	46.13	74.24	I-80/I-94 at Illinois state line in Munster	I-94 at Michigan state line northeast of Michigan City	1956	current	

== Auxiliary Interstates ==
Number	Length (mi)	Length (km)	Southern or western terminus	Northern or eastern terminus	Formed	Removed	Notes
I-164	21.39	34.42	US 41/Veterans Memorial Parkway in Evansville	I-64/I-69 northwest of Elberfeld	1968	2014	Redesignated as I-69 in 2014
I-165	—	—	I-70/I-65 "North Split" interchange in downtown Indianapolis	38th Street in Indianapolis	1978	1981	Cancelled; instead, lanes were added on I-70 from the North Split to I-465 on the eastside, and on I-465 to the I-69 interchange on the northside.
I-265	13.11	21.10	I-64/US 150 in New Albany	I-265 at Kentucky state line	1977	current	Part of outer beltway around Louisville, Kentucky
I-275	3.16	5.09	I-275 at Kentucky state line (Ohio River)	I-275 at Ohio state line	1962	current	Part of a beltway around Cincinnati, Ohio
I-294	15	24	I-80/I-90/I-294/US 6/US 41 Toll at Illinois state line	I-80/I-90/I-94/Indiana Toll Road in Lake Station	1958	1965	Formerly routed along the entirety of the Borman Expressway (I-80/I-90 [now I-94]); only I-294 in Illinois remains
I-465	52.79	84.96	Beltway around Indianapolis		1959	current	Indianapolis beltway
I-469	30.83	49.62	I-69 south of Fort Wayne	I-69 north of Fort Wayne	1989	current	Southern, eastern, and northern bypass around Fort Wayne
I-865	4.72	7.60	I-65 near Royalton	I-465 south of Zionsville	2002	current	Connector between I-465 and I-65 in northwest of Indianapolis; renumbered from I-465 to eliminate three-way intersection of I-465
Former; Proposed and unbuilt
