= Indiana State Road 933 =

Highway in Indiana

State Road 933
- SR 933 highlighted in red

Route information
- Maintained by INDOT
- Length: 16.83 mi (27.09 km)
- Existed: 1998–present

Major junctions
- South end: Lincoln Way & Ash Road in Osceola
- US 31 / SR 23 in South Bend; I-80 Toll / I-90 Toll / Indiana Toll Road in Roseland
- North end: M-51 near Roseland

Location
- Country: United States
- State: Indiana

Highway system
- Indiana State Highway System; Interstate; US; State; Scenic
← SR 931	→ SR 1

State Road 933 (SR 933) is an Indiana State Road that runs between Elkhart and South Bend in US state of Indiana. The 16.83 miles (27.09 km) of SR 933 that lie within the state serve as a major conduit. None of the highway is listed on the National Highway System. Various sections are urban two-lane highway and urbanized four-lane divided highway. The highway passes through residential and commercial properties.

SR 933 was first designated as a state road in the 1990s. A section of the highway originally served as part of the Lincoln Highway. SR 933 replaced the original SR 1 and SR 2 designations of the highway which dated back to the formation of the Indiana State Road system. The highway replaced the U.S. Route 33 (US 33) designation of the highway which dated back to the 1930s.

== Route description ==
SR 933 southern terminus is at the St. Joseph–Elkhart county line. The highway follows Lincolnway and heads due west. The road is placed between Norfolk Southern Railroad tracks and commercial properties, before being surrounded by commercial properties, in Osceola. After leaving Osceola, the route enters Mishawaka. There the road passes through mostly residential, as a four-lane undivided road with a center turn lane. In Mishawaka the route has a traffic light at SR 331.

West of SR 331, SR 933 enters downtown Mishawaka and has an intersection at Main Street, Old SR 331. The road leaves Mishawaka heading west towards South Bend, passing through commercial properties. The highway curves northwest parallel to the St. Joseph River and has an interchange with SR 23. This interchange is the east end of the concurrency between SR 23 and SR 933. The concurrency heads due west into downtown South Bend, crossing under the Norfolk Southern Railroad tracks. In downtown South Bend the concurrency ends when SR 933 turns north onto Main Street.

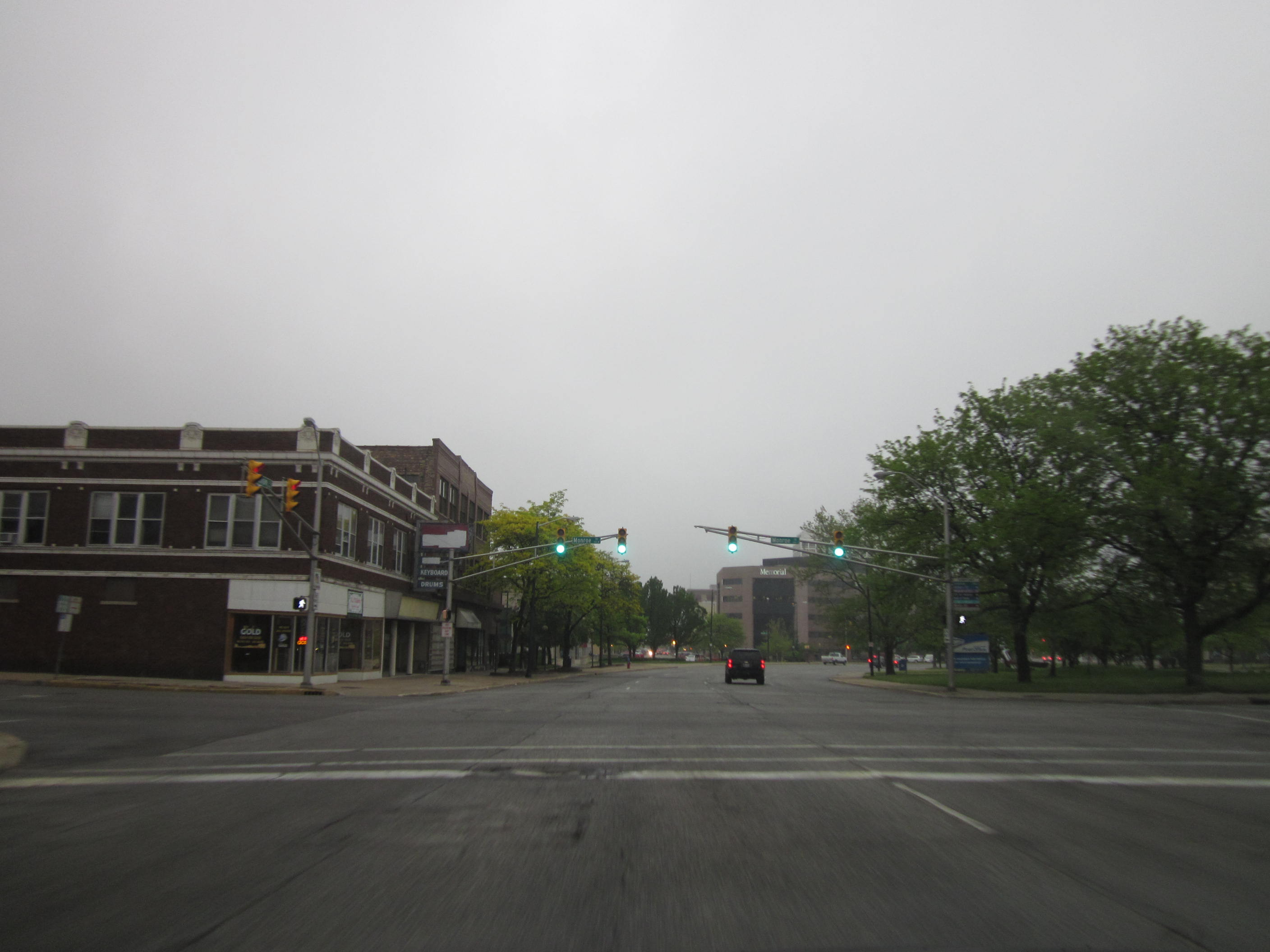
Michigan Street at Monroe Street in downtown South Bend, 2012. Until 2016 this was the routing of SR 933 northbound.

SR 933 follows Main Street through downtown South Bend, passing under the Norfolk Southern again. On the north side of downtown SR 933 follows Marion Street east for one block to Michigan Street. The highway heads north as a four-lane undivided highway with a center turn lane.

Michigan Street crosses over the St. Joseph River as it leaves downtown South Bend. The highway heads for Roseland, passing between the University of Notre Dame on the east side of the road and Holy Cross College and Saint Mary's College on the west side of the road. North Saint Mary's College is the access road to the Indiana Toll Road (Interstate 80/Interstate 90). The road passes under the Indiana Toll Road, as it passes through commercial properties heading towards the state line. SR 933 ends at the Indiana–Michigan state line; the roadway continues into Michigan as M-51.

No part of SR 933 is included as a part of the National Highway System (NHS). The NHS is a network of highways that are identified as being most important for the economy, mobility and defense of the nation. The highway is maintained by the Indiana Department of Transportation (INDOT) like all other state roads in the state. The department tracks the traffic volumes along all state highways as a part of its maintenance responsibilities using a metric called average annual daily traffic (AADT). This measurement is a calculation of the traffic level along a segment of roadway for any average day of the year. In 2010, INDOT figured that lowest traffic levels were the 12,300 vehicles and 197 commercial vehicles used the highway daily on a section between Marion Street and Riverside Drive north of downtown South Bend. The peak traffic volumes were 25,040 vehicles and 2,610 commercial vehicles AADT along a section of SR 933 near Bittersweet Road in Mishawaka.

== History ==
In 1917, Main Market route number 1 was given to the north–south section and Main Market route number 2 was the given to the east–west route that SR 933 takes today. Main Market 2 was also known as the Lincoln highway. In 1926, at the creation of the U.S. Routes, SR 1 was changed to US 31 and the east–west stayed as SR 2. Then the SR 2 section became US 33 in 1935, and US 33 was concurrent with US 31 north of Sample Street.

In 1991 the US 20 bypass opened around Elkhart and South Bend and in 1998 INDOT removed US 33 north of US 20 to the Michigan state line. The road was to come under local jurisdiction in Elkhart and St. Joseph counties. Local governments in Elkhart County, mainly the city of Elkhart, accepted jurisdiction of the road, while St. Joseph County did not accept local control and the road became SR 933 within that area. In 2004, INDOT tried to eliminate SR 933 and again St. Joseph County did not accept local control so the designation remained unchanged.

In 2016 South Bend's "Smart Streets" project converted certain streets from one-way traffic to two-way traffic, including streets that SR 933 followed. As a result, SR 933 was removed from Michigan Street and St. Joseph Street, up until then the one-way northbound routing, between Sample Street and Marion Street, and was left solely on Main Street, up until then the one-way southbound routing, between those two streets.

The portion north of Angela Boulevard on the north side of South Bend was expected to be removed from the state highway system in mid-2018.

== Major intersections ==
The entire route is in St. Joseph County.

Location	mi	km	Destinations	Notes
Osceola	0.00	0.00	Lincoln Highway (Ash Road / Lincoln Way)	Southern terminus of SR 933
Mishawaka	4.05	6.52	SR 331 – Bremen	
South Bend	9.51	15.30	SR 23 north / Lincoln Highway	Southern end of SR 23 concurrency
South Bend	10.12	16.29	US 31 Bus. / SR 23 south – Walkerton	Northern end of SR 23 concurrency; southern end of US 31 Business concurrency
Roseland	13.29	21.39	I-80 Toll / I-90 Toll / US 31 Bus. / Indiana Toll Road – Chicago, Ohio	Exit 77 on the Indiana Toll Road; northern end of US 31 Business concurrency
Roseland	16.83	27.09	M-51 north – Niles	Northern terminus of SR 933
1.000 mi = 1.609 km; 1.000 km = 0.621 mi: Concurrency terminus
