= Indiana State Road 912 =

Highway in Indiana

State Road 912
- Cline Avenue
- Map of northwest Indiana with SR 912 in red

Route information
- Maintained by INDOT
- Length: 11.69 mi (18.81 km)

Major junctions
- West end: I-90 Toll / Indiana Toll Road in Hammond
- US 41 in Hammond; US 12 in Gary; SR 312 in Gary; US 20 in Gary; I-80 / I-94 / US 6 in Gary
- South end: Ridge Road in Griffith

Location
- Country: United States
- State: Indiana
- Counties: Lake

Highway system
- Indiana State Highway System; Interstate; US; State; Scenic
← SR 827	→ SR 930

State Road 912 (SR 912), known along its entire length as Cline Avenue, is a freeway north of the combined Interstate 80/I-94/U.S. Route 6 (I-80/I-94/US 6, Borman Expressway), and a local access road serving Griffith south of the Borman. The portion of Cline Avenue marked as SR 912 is 11.69 miles (18.81 km) long.

On April 15, 1982, part of a ramp under construction collapsed during concrete pouring operations near the Indiana Harbor and Ship Canal, killing fourteen highway workers and injuring eighteen more. In 1987, the state designated the route between US 12 and the Indiana Toll Road as the Highway Construction Workers Memorial Highway.

From December 28, 2009, to December 23, 2020, the Indiana Department of Transportation (INDOT) closed the elevated bridge portion of Cline Avenue between Calumet and Michigan Avenues, a distance of nearly 3.5 miles (5.6 km). Corrosion had severely weakened most elements of the bridge, including the bridge piers, concrete, beams and cables. The bridge was demolished and replaced with a toll crossing. Similar cases of corrosion have been identified in other bridges across the country.

== Route description ==
The freeway runs east from exit 3 of the Indiana Toll Road and then meeting US 41 after that. At this point, the road then crosses a toll bridge above the Indiana Harbor and Ship Canal. After crossing the bridge, the portion ahead serves several of the steel mills (many now owned by Cleveland-Cliffs) and the casino in East Chicago. It also serves the Gary/Chicago International Airport. Continuing south, it then meets the Indiana Toll Road for the second time, this time at exit 10 of the Toll Road. The north–south portion between US 20 and the Borman Expressway (I-80/I-94/US 6) and follows the border between Gary and Hammond, Indiana.

South of the Borman Expressway, Cline Avenue downgrades into a four-lane divided highway. SR 912 extends south 1 mile (1.6 km) to Ridge Road (Business US 6).

== History ==
Before the construction of the expressway, portions of Truck Route 912 were on Kennedy Avenue. Some 5.7 miles (9.2 km) of new freeway from the Toll Road to Chicago Avenue was constructed at a cost of $250 million (1982, $551 million in 2008).

=== Ramp collapse ===
On April 15, 1982, 14 workers were killed and 18 injured when falsework beneath a ramp failed during a concrete pour. At 10:40 a.m., Unit 4 (one of the bridge sections), collapsed, destroying the scaffold stairway and stranding workers on the remaining sections above. Workers on Unit 4 were crushed to death when the section flipped and landed upside-down while descending due to tension in the cables.

Surviving construction workers brought in a cherry picker to rescue the remaining workers stranded on the ramp, but five minutes after the initial collapse, Unit 5, the neighboring section, also collapsed. Twelve workers in total were killed instantly; a 13th died two weeks after the collapse, and the 14th worker died of injuries suffered during the collapse two years later. The accident remains Indiana's deadliest industrial or construction accident.

Investigators from the National Bureau of Standards for the Occupational Safety and Health Administration (OSHA) discovered several errors that caused the collapse of the bridge section. The most likely cause of the collapse was "the cracking of a concrete pad supporting a leg of the shoring towers". The failure of the concrete pad, built too thinly, led to another finding; one-inch (2.5 cm) bolts that were supposed to connect key stringers to cross-beams instead were replaced with frictional clips, but investigators did not find any documentation that supported this substitution. Investigators could not locate any engineering calculations supporting the pads as designed; worse, the pads were built substandard to the undocumented design.

Lawsuits against companies involved in building the ramp were settled out of court, as no single party could be found to explain the discrepancies. The bridge finally opened in 1986. In 1987, the state designated the route between US 12 and the Indiana Toll Road as the "Highway Construction Workers Memorial Highway," in their memory.

=== Sniper investigation ===
During the middle of 2006, numerous drivers reported possible attacks by a sniper on the eastern portion of Cline Avenue. Drivers reported having their windows and windshields shattered by unknown projectiles. Investigators, including the Federal Bureau of Investigation, suspected an assailant armed with a slingshot or a BB gun was shooting out windows. Others suspected the broken windows were due to flying gravel and abnormally warm temperatures. The shootings were not related to an earlier July 25 shooting death of a motorist on I-65 south of Indianapolis. No arrests were ever made in the case, and the shootings ended around the beginning of the school year.

=== Bridge closure and replacement ===
Cline Avenue Bridge
- Carries: Motor vehicles on SR 912 (Cline Avenue)
- Crosses: Indiana Harbor and Ship Canal
- Locale: East Chicago, Indiana
- Maintained by: United Bridge Partners

Characteristics
- Design: Segmental bridge
- Material: Concrete
- Total length: 1.7 miles (2.7 km)
- Width: 46 feet (14 m)
- No. of lanes: 2

History
- Construction start: June 2017; 9 years ago
- Opened: December 23, 2020; 5 years ago

Statistics
- Toll: E-ZPass/I-Pass: $2.50 (2-axles); $6.50 (3 or 4-axles); $10.50 (5-axles); Pay by plate: $5.50 (2-axles); $9.50 (3 or 4-axles); $13.50 (5-axles)

On November 13, 2009, the Indiana Department of Transportation (INDOT) closed the bridge portion over the Indiana Harbor and Ship Canal (the portions of the road between exits 1 and 5A) to all traffic after consultants released details of an inspection on the bridge, citing safety concerns equivalent to the August 2007 I-35W bridge collapse in Minneapolis.

The bridge was originally supposed to be replaced within three years, but then INDOT claimed the $90 million expense for a new bridge for 30,000 vehicles per day was not justifiable. Instead, INDOT focused on upgrading the roadways being used as a detour around the bridge to handle the added traffic. On April 15, 2010, INDOT announced its plan to demolish the bridge and reroute traffic via Riley and Dickey roads.

On November 2, 2010, INDOT reopened the westbound lanes of SR 912 from Riley Road to the Indiana Toll Road, while awaiting results of an environmental impact study to determine if the eastbound lanes should be reopened. While the ramp from westbound Riley Road to SR 912 reopened, crews demolished the eastbound ramp from SR 912 to Riley Road as it was found to be structurally unsound.

Demolition of the bridge continued into 2012 and was completed in January 2013. The span over the Indiana Harbor Ship Channel was removed by conventional demolition methods, while the spans over land were removed with explosives. On January 8, 2013, the bridge demolition was completed.

On March 30, 2015, a vehicle was following outdated GPS data and apparently drove around multiple warning signs and barriers, driving off the closed bridge and resulting in the death of the vehicle's passenger.

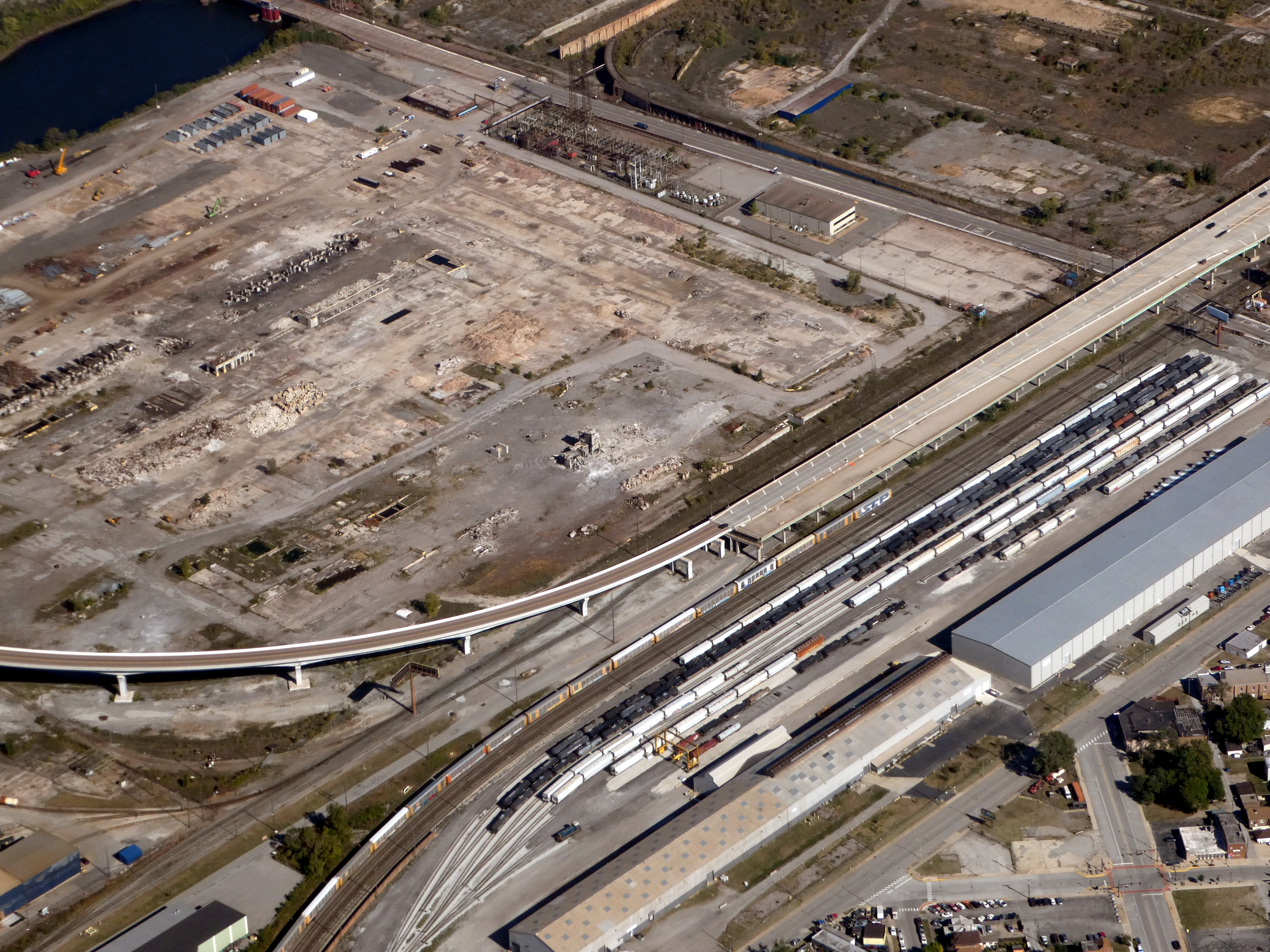
The original 4-lane viaduct (right) and the newer 2-lane viaduct

Discussion on replacing the span continued, and in 2012, INDOT agreed to replace the span with a private toll bridge. The state sought a private partnership in a joint venture with United Bridge Partners who is joined by FIGG Bridge Companies, Lane Construction Corp. and American Infrastructure MLP funds. Construction of the bridge was expected to begin in early 2014 and take approximately 2 1/2 years to complete. The cost of the bridge is expected to be $150–250 million to complete depending on whether steel beams from the original structure can be reused. The FIGG Group, having won awards for its bridge designs, will be incorporating unique design features into the new bridge, including LED lighting on the concrete piers, making it a gateway attraction. Toll schedules are not yet set but are expected to be anywhere from $2.50 to $3.50 for cars.

However, the project's groundbreaking construction occurred in June 2017 instead of 2014. Not only that, The Figg Group later revised the bridge's completion year to 2019.

On April 16, 2020, the bridge construction was almost done but Randy Palmateer, business manager for Northwestern Indiana Building and Construction Trades Council said, "The job is shut down." This shutdown is caused by management issues, and the end of the project was delayed until further notice. The FIGG Bridge group did not respond to the workers that were being laid off and the temporary cancellation of the bridge construction. As a result of management issues, the owner of the bridge, Cline Avenue Bridge LLC, had cut ties with FIGG Bridge Builders.

The bridge owners took legal action against the Great American Insurance Group for $105 million in August 2020.

On December 23, 2020, a two-lane toll bridge reopened to traffic. The bridge was initially free until January 31, 2021. After that, toll collections began at a discount; regular price was implemented starting in the beginning of March.

== Major intersections ==
The entire highway is in Lake County.

Location	mi	km	Exit	Destinations	Notes
Hammond	0.00	0.00		I-90 Toll west / Indiana Toll Road west – Chicago	Western terminus; exit 3 on I-90 / Toll Road
Hammond	0.81– 1.09	1.30– 1.75	—	US 41 (Calumet Avenue)	Last westbound exit before toll
East Chicago	2.46	3.96		Riley Road	Westbound entrance only
East Chicago			Cline Avenue Bridge (toll; E-ZPass, I-Pass, or pay-by-plate)		
East Chicago	4.04	6.50	5A	Cleveland-Cliffs Plant 1, Michigan Avenue	Last westbound exit before toll
East Chicago	4.09	6.58		Block Avenue	Southbound entrance only
East Chicago	4.33– 4.48	6.97– 7.21	5B	Cleveland-Cliffs Plant 2	Southbound exit signed Jeorse Park, Pastrick Marina
East Chicago			5C	Jeorse Park, Pastrick Marina – Ameristar Casino	No southbound exit
Gary	5.26– 5.62	8.47– 9.04	6A	US 12 west (Columbus Drive) / SR 312 west (Chicago Avenue) / Buffington Harbor Drive	No southbound entrance; northbound exit to Buffington Harbor Drive only
Gary	5.62	9.04	6B	Airport Road	Southbound exit; formerly eastbound US 12
Gary	5.84– 5.94	9.40– 9.56	6	US 12 west / LMCT (Columbus Drive) / Airport Road	Northern end of US 12 concurrency; southbound entrance and northbound exit
Gary	6.53	10.51	7A	SR 312 west (Chicago Avenue)	Northbound exit and southbound entrance
Gary	6.93	11.15	7B	Gary Road to I-90 Toll / Indiana Toll Road / Chicago Skyway west – Chicago, Ohio	Signed as exit 7 southbound; Gary Road signed as Gary Avenue
Hammond–Gary city line	7.88– 8.26	12.68– 13.29	8	US 12 east / US 20 / LMCT (Michigan Street / 5th Avenue) – Gary, Michigan City, South Bend	Southern end of US 12 concurrency; signed as exits 8A (west) and 8B (east)
Hammond–Gary city line	8.99– 9.32	14.47– 15.00	9	169th Street, 15th Avenue	
Hammond–Gary city line	10.32– 10.48	16.61– 16.87	10	I-80 / I-94 / US 6 (Borman Expressway) to I-65 – Chicago, Detroit	Signed as exits 10A (west) and 10B (east); exit 5 on I-80/I-94
Hammond–Gary city line			Southern end of freeway section		
Highland–Griffith town line	11.69	18.81		Ridge Road	Southern terminus
1.000 mi = 1.609 km; 1.000 km = 0.621 mi: Concurrency terminus; Incomplete access; Tolled
