= U.S. Route 31 in Indiana =

Highway in Indiana

U.S. Route 31
- US 31 highlighted in red; unsigned portion on beltway in orange

Route information
- Maintained by INDOT
- Length: 257.6 mi (414.6 km)
- Existed: October 1, 1926–present

Major junctions
- South end: US 31 at the Kentucky state line in Jeffersonville
- I-65 Toll Jeffersonville; I-65 in Crothersville; I-65 in Taylorsville; I-69 / I-74 / I-465 in Indianapolis; I-65 in Indianapolis; I-74 in Indianapolis; I-70 in Indianapolis; I-69 in Indianapolis; I-465 in Carmel; I-80 Toll / I-90 Toll / Indiana Toll Road in South Bend
- North end: US 31 at the Michigan state line near South Bend

Location
- Country: United States
- State: Indiana
- Counties: Clark, Scott, Jackson, Bartholomew, Johnson, Marion, Hamilton, Tipton, Howard, Miami, Fulton, Marshall, St. Joseph

Highway system
- United States Numbered Highway System; List; Special; Divided; Indiana State Highway System; Interstate; US; State; Scenic
← US 30	→ SR 32

U.S. Route 31 (US 31) is a part of the United States Numbered Highway System that runs from Spanish Fort, Alabama, to Mackinaw City, Michigan. It enters the U.S. state of Indiana via the George Rogers Clark Memorial Bridge between Louisville, Kentucky, and Clarksville, Indiana. The 257.6 miles (414.57 km) of US 31 that lie within Indiana serve as a major conduit. Some of the highway is listed on the National Highway System. Various sections are rural two-lane highway and urbanized four- or six-lane divided expressway. The northernmost community along the highway is South Bend near the Michigan state line.

US 31 was first designated as a US Highway in October 1926. A northern section (from Rochester to South Bend) and a far southern section (on old US 31W into Louisville on the K&I Bridge) of the highway originally served as part of the Dixie Highway. US 31 was the Jackson Highway from Indianapolis to Seymour. US 31 replaced the original State Road 1 (SR 1) designation of the highway which dated back to the formation of the Indiana State Road system. SR 1 ran from Clarksville through Indianapolis to South Bend and ended at the Michigan state line.

== Route description ==
Only the segment of US 31 that is north of Indianapolis is included as a part of the National Highway System (NHS). The NHS is a network of highways that are identified as being most important for the economy, mobility and defense of the nation. The highway is maintained by the Indiana Department of Transportation (INDOT) like all other U.S. Routes in the state. The department tracks the traffic volumes along all state highways as a part of its maintenance responsibilities using a metric called average annual daily traffic (AADT). This measurement is a calculation of the traffic level along a segment of roadway for any average day of the year. In 2010, INDOT figured that lowest traffic levels were the 3,690 personal vehicles and 160 commercial vehicles that used the highway daily near Memphis. The peak traffic volume was 168,770 personal vehicles and 18,090 commercial vehicles along the section of US 31 concurrent with Interstate 465 (I–465).

=== Jeffersonville to Columbus ===
US 31 overlaps I-65 in Jeffersonville, after crossing the George Rogers Clark Memorial Bridge from Kentucky. It then diverges as the access frontage lanes before splitting off north of Jeffersonville at Clarksville and proceeding to Indianapolis. US 31 was widened to two lanes in both directions for its length through Columbus in the early 2000s.

=== Columbus to Indianapolis ===
At I-465 on the south side of Indianapolis, US 31 is routed onto I-465 on the east side of the city. This is the closest approach the highway makes to downtown Indianapolis. Previously the northbound route of the highway through Indianapolis was on East Street, Madison Avenue, Delaware Street, North Street, and onto Meridian Street; southbound was on Meridian Street, North Street, Pennsylvania Street, Madison Avenue, and onto East Street.

=== Indianapolis to Michigan ===
US 31 exits I-465 (coincidentally at exit 31) in Carmel, and continues northward as a freeway through Westfield. North of SR 38, it reverts to an at-grade expressway until reaching the Kokomo area, where it again becomes a full freeway to bypass that city to the east. North of the Kokomo area US 31 again becomes a rural expressway, which skirts Peru, Rochester, and Plymouth. At US 30 east of Plymouth, US 31 becomes a freeway again and remains so for the rest of its path in the state. After bypassing Lakeville to the east, US 31 approaches South Bend. There the route converges with US 20 (St. Joseph Valley Parkway) and proceeds west and then north to bypass South Bend. After US 20 splits off to the west near the South Bend Airport, US 31 has an interchange with the Indiana Toll Road (I-80/I-90) before proceeding north into Michigan.

== History ==
US 31 was signed into law by the Governor on March 7, 1917, as Main Market Highway 1, and signs were installed on June 1 of that year. The name was changed to State Road 1 within a year when Indiana began the state road system. By 1924, most of the route was paved, leaving only from Columbus to Franklin and from Peru to Plymouth that was unpaved. On October 1, 1926, US 31 was designated along what was SR 1 at the time.

Reroutes of US 31 have created designations such as the former SR 311, the northern segment of SR 11, both sections of the former SR 431, and the Peru and South Bend business routes.

In 2003, the Indiana Senate unanimously passed a resolution calling for federal funding for a proposal to upgrade US 31 from South Bend to Indianapolis to Interstate Highway standards and designate the route as I-67, with the route possibly continuing northward to Benton Harbor, Michigan, and going northward from there along the existing I-196 to Grand Rapids. However, upgrading the highway to Interstate Highway standards was later deemed cost-prohibitive, and the concept was dropped in favor of simply upgrading the route to expressway standards. In the meantime, the state expedited the upgrading of three major sections on US 31 between Indianapolis and South Bend using funds received through the 2006 Major Moves deal. These three projects were completed in the early 2010s: A new 14-mile (23 km) freeway bypass of Kokomo in 2013, a new freeway segment from Plymouth to South Bend, which was constructed largely on a new alignment, in 2014, and an upgrade of the road from I-465 in Indianapolis to SR 38 north of Westfield in 2015. A portion of the Plymouth–South Bend section was dedicated as the Richard W. Mangus Memorial Highway in honor of the local state representative who supported the freeway's construction. The entirety of the former segment of US 31 bypassed by the freeway segment in Kokomo and a portion of the one bypassed between Plymouth and South Bend were designated as SR 931.

== Future ==
The remaining 78 miles (126 km) of US 31 between South Bend and Indianapolis is gradually being converted to a limited access highway without traffic signals, starting with an interchange at SR 28 in Tipton County, which opened in November 2016. As of 2018, there were six traffic signals left between Indianapolis and South Bend, and a program introduced by Governor Eric Holcomb in September 2018 proposed to remove four of those. In 2020, INDOT expected all six signals to be removed by the end of 2026. Railroad at-grade crossings were replaced with overpasses in Tipton County in 2023 and Marshall County in 2025. As of 2025 a project to upgrade the highway in Fulton County and Marshall County was underway. INDOT gave the SR 10 intersection in Argos special consideration in February 2026 after a spate of fatal crashes; its median break was permanently closed in June and U-turns on US 31 north and south of the intersection will be added to create a reduced conflict intersection.

The approximately 20-mile (32 km) stretch of US 31 between SR 38 in Hamilton County and SR 931 in Tipton County, south of Kokomo, had been planned to be converted to a freeway, with estimated completion in 2025. However, after the state determined that the original plans would severely limit access within Tipton County, those upgrades were removed from consideration until further study could be completed and these issues mitigated. As of 2021 upgrade plans are only slated for Hamilton County.

== Major intersections ==
County	Location	mi	km	Exit	Destinations	Notes
Ohio River		0.00	0.00		US 31 south – Louisville	Continuation into Kentucky
Ohio River		0.00	0.00		Clark Memorial Bridge; Indiana–Kentucky line	
Clark	Jeffersonville	0.30	0.48		Court Avenue	Interchange; northbound exit and southbound entrance; entrance ramp includes direct entrance from Missouri Avenue
Clark	Jeffersonville				I-65 Toll south (John F. Kennedy Memorial Bridge) – Louisville	I-65 exit 1; US 31 serves as service drives for freeway through I-65 exit 4
Clark	Jeffersonville	0.41	0.66		6th Street, Court Avenue	Interchange; southbound exit and northbound entrance
Clark	Jeffersonville–Clarksville line	0.87	1.40		10th Street	Interchange; no northbound exit
Clark	Clarksville				Stansifer Avenue	Partial interchange; at-grade intersection northbound, exit and entrance southbound
Clark	Clarksville	1.51	2.43		Brown's Station Way – New Albany	Interchange; northbound exit and southbound entrance; former SR 62
Clark	Jeffersonville Township				Kopp Lane	Southbound exit only
Clark	Jeffersonville Township	3.71	5.97		I-65 north – Indianapolis	I-65 exit 4
Clark	Jeffersonville Township	6.16	9.91		SR 60 west – Salem	Eastern end of SR 60
Clark	Henryville	19.58	31.51		SR 160 – Salem, Charlestown	
Scott	Vienna Township	27.19	43.76		SR 356 east – Lexington	Western end of SR 356
Scott	Scottsburg	29.76	47.89		SR 56 – Salem, Hanover	
Scott	Austin	34.25	55.12		SR 256 – Madison	
Jackson	Crothersville	37.14– 37.30	59.77– 60.03		I-65 – Indianapolis, Louisville	Exit 36 on I-65
Jackson	Crothersville	42.07	67.71		SR 250 – Brownstown	
Jackson	Seymour	50.42	81.14		US 50 – Seymour, North Vernon	
Bartholomew	Columbus	64.86	104.38		SR 7 – Columbus, North Vernon	
Bartholomew	Columbus	65.28	105.06		SR 46 – Columbus, Greensburg	
Bartholomew	Taylorsville	77.13– 77.60	124.13– 124.89		I-65 – Indianapolis, Louisville	Exit 76 on I-65
Johnson	Edinburgh	81.39	130.98		SR 252 east – Edinburgh	Southern end of SR 252 concurrency
Johnson	Blue River Township	85.11	136.97		SR 252 west – Martinsville	Northern end of SR 252 concurrency
Johnson	Franklin				Jefferson Street – Fairgrounds, Franklin College	To SR 44; serves Johnson Memorial Hospital
Marion	Indianapolis				SR 135 south (Thompson Road)	
Marion	Indianapolis	107.17	172.47		I-69 / I-74 / I-465 / US 36 / US 40 west / SR 67 south	South end of freeway section; southern end of I-69/I-74/I-465/US 36/US 40/SR 67 concurrencies; exit 2B on I-465
Marion	Indianapolis			2A	East Street north	Exit numbers follow I-465; no northbound entrance; no exit number northbound
Marion	Indianapolis			53	I-65 – Indianapolis, Louisville	Exit 106 on I-65
Marion	Beech Grove–Indianapolis line			52	Emerson Avenue	
Marion	Indianapolis			49	I-74 east (US 421 south) / Southeastern Avenue – Cincinnati	Northern end of I-74 concurrency; southern end of US 421 concurrency
Marion	Indianapolis			48	Shadeland Avenue	Northbound exit and southbound entrance
Marion	Indianapolis			47	US 52 east (Brookville Road) – Cincinnati	Northern end of US 52 concurrency
Marion	Indianapolis			46	US 40 east (Washington Street) – Dayton	Northern end of US 40 concurrency
Marion	Indianapolis			44	I-70 / Shadeland Avenue – Indianapolis, Dayton	Signed as exits 44A (east) & 44B (west) northbound; I-70 east exit 89, west exit 90; Shadeland Avenue not signed northbound
Marion	Indianapolis–Lawrence line			42	US 36 east / SR 67 north (Pendleton Pike)	Northern end of US 36/SR 67 concurrency
Marion	Lawrence–Indianapolis line			40	Shadeland Avenue / 56th Street	
Marion	Indianapolis			37A	I-69 north / SR 37 north – Fort Wayne	Northern end of I-69 concurrency; exit 200 on I-69 south
Marion	Indianapolis			37B	Binford Boulevard – Indianapolis	Southbound exit and northbound entrance; former SR 37 south
Marion	Indianapolis			35	Allisonville Road	Single-point urban interchange
Marion	Indianapolis			33	Keystone Avenue – Carmel	Former SR 431
Hamilton	Carmel	123.4	198.6	123	I-465 / US 52 west / US 421 north – Indianapolis	Exit numbers follow US 31; no exit number northbound; northern ends of I-465/US 52/US 421 concurrencies; exit 31 on I-465
Hamilton	Carmel	123.4	198.6	—	Meridian Street south to Downtown	Left exit and entrances; former US 31 south
Hamilton	Carmel	124.18	199.85	124	106th Street	Roundabout exit; no exit number northbound
Hamilton	Carmel	125.19	201.47	125	116th Street	Roundabout exit
Hamilton	Carmel	125.8	202.5	126	Old Meridian Street	Northbound exit only
Hamilton	Carmel	126.69	203.89	127	Main Street	Roundabout exit
Hamilton	Carmel	127.68	205.48	128	136th Street	Roundabout exit
Hamilton	Carmel–Westfield line	129.1	207.8	129B	Keystone Parkway Rangeline Road, Clay Terrace Boulevard	Northern terminus of Keystone Parkway; southbound exit and northbound entrance
Hamilton	Carmel–Westfield line	129.1	207.8	129A	146th Street, 151st Street	City line at 146th Street
Hamilton	Westfield	130.68	210.31	131	161st Street	Roundabout exit
Hamilton	Westfield	132.15	212.67	132	SR 32 (Main Street) – Lebanon, Noblesville	
Hamilton	Westfield	133.76	215.27	134	191st Street	Roundabout exit
Hamilton	Westfield	135.79	218.53	136	SR 38 (Sheridan Road) – Sheridan, Noblesville	Northern end of freeway
Hamilton	Bakers Corner	138	222	138	236th Street	Tight diamond roundabout interchange opened on November 15, 2023
Hamilton	Adams Township	142.29	228.99	142	276th Street	Folded diamond interchange (loops in NW and SE quadrants) opened in December 2023
Tipton	Jefferson Township	148	238	148	SR 28 – Frankfort, Tipton, Elwood	Rounabout interchange; opened November 2016
Tipton	Jefferson Township	156	251	156	SR 931 north – Kokomo	South end of freeway; southern terminus of SR 931; northbound exit and southbound entrance
Howard	Oakford	158	254	158	SR 26 – Hartford City, Lafayette	
Howard	Taylor Township	161.5	259.9	161	E. Boulevard Street (County Road 100S)	
Howard	Darrough Chapel	162	261	162	US 35 south (Markland Avenue) / SR 22 – Kokomo, Gas City	Southern end of US 35 concurrency
Howard	Center–Howard township line	165	266	165	Touby Pike	
Howard	Howard Township	166	267	166	US 35 north – Logansport, La Porte, Michigan City	Northern end of US 35 concurrency; northbound exit and southbound entrance
Howard	Howard–Clay township line	167	269	167	SR 931 south – Kokomo	Northern terminus of SR 931; southbound exit and northbound entrance; northern end of freeway
Miami	Deer Creek Township	170	270	170	SR 18 – Galveston, Marion	To be converted into interchange
Miami	Pipe Creek Township				SR 218 east – Bunker Hill	Southern end of SR 218 concurrency
Miami	Pipe Creek Township				SR 218 west – Walton	Northern end of SR 218 concurrency
Miami	Pipe Creek Township				US 31 Bus. north – Peru	Southern terminus of Bus. US 31; to be converted into interchange
Miami	Peru Township	181.51	292.11		Logansport Road (US 24 Bus.) – Peru	Interchange via connector road
Miami	Peru Township	182– 183	293– 295	196	US 24 – Peru, Fort Wayne, Logansport	Signed as exits 196A (east, Peru, Fort Wayne) and 196B (west, Logansport)
Miami	Jefferson–Union township line				SR 16 – Denver	
Fulton	Rochester	203.47	327.45	212	SR 25 (Main Street) – Rochester, Logansport	Diamond interchange; to SR 14
Fulton–Marshall county line	Richland–Walnut township line				SR 110 – Mentone	Future interchange
Marshall	Argos				SR 10 (Indiana Avenue) – Culver, Argos	Future interchange
Marshall	Plymouth	224.22	360.85	Bridge over Lincoln Highway (Old US 30); no access to/from highway		
Marshall	Plymouth	225.41	362.76	225	US 30 – Valparaiso, Warsaw	South end of freeway; signed as exits 225A (east) and 225B (west)
Marshall	Plymouth	227.38	365.93	227	Veterans Parkway	7th Road to the east
Marshall	La Paz	232.67	374.45	233	US 6 – Walkerton, Bremen	
St. Joseph	Lakeville	239.33	385.16	239	SR 4 west (Pierce Road) – La Porte	Eastern end of the western section SR 4
St. Joseph	South Bend	244.73	393.85	245	Kern Road	
St. Joseph	South Bend	245.89	395.72	246A	US 20 east (St. Joseph Valley Parkway east) – Elkhart	Southbound left entrance (via Bus. US 31) and northbound exit
St. Joseph	South Bend	245.89	395.72	—	Michigan Street (US 31 Bus. north)	Southern terminus of Bus. US 31; no direct southbound exit; Bus. US 31 exit 246B; serves Memorial Hospital of South Bend
St. Joseph	South Bend	245.89	395.72	—	US 20 east (St. Joseph Valley Parkway east) – Elkhart	Southern end of US 20 concurrency; southbound left exit and northbound left entrance
St. Joseph	South Bend			76	SR 23 – North Liberty, South Bend	
St. Joseph	Portage Township			75	Mayflower Road	No northbound exit to southbound Mayflower Road or southbound entrance from northbound Mayflower Road
St. Joseph	Portage Township			73A	Western Avenue	
St. Joseph	Portage Township			73B	SR 2 west – La Porte	Eastern terminus of SR 2
St. Joseph	South Bend	253.75	408.37	254A	Lincoln Way	Serves South Bend International Airport
St. Joseph	South Bend	253.75	408.37	254B	US 20 west – New Carlisle	Northern end of US 20 concurrency
St. Joseph	South Bend	254.98– 255.12	410.35– 410.58	255A	Nimtz Parkway	Northbound exit and southbound entrance
St. Joseph	South Bend	254.98– 255.12	410.35– 410.58	255B	I-80 Toll / I-90 Toll / Indiana Toll Road	Exit 72 on I-80 / I-90 / Toll Road
St. Joseph	South Bend	254.98– 255.12	410.35– 410.58	255A	Nimtz Parkway	Southbound exit and northbound entrance
St. Joseph	South Bend	255.91	411.85	256	US 31 Bus. south (Cleveland Road) / Brick Road	Northern terminus of Bus. US 31
St. Joseph	South Bend	257.6	414.6		US 31 north (St. Joseph Valley Parkway) – Niles	Continuation into Michigan
1.000 mi = 1.609 km; 1.000 km = 0.621 mi: Concurrency terminus; Incomplete access; Tolled; Unopened

== See also ==
- Indiana State Road 331
- Indiana State Road 933 (follows in part a former routing of US 31)

U.S. Route 31
Previous state: Kentucky	Indiana	Next state: Michigan
