= Numbered highways in Indiana =

Overview of the different highway systems in the U.S. state of Indiana

- Standard highway markers

System information
- Notes: Indiana Routes are generally state-maintained.

Highway names
- Interstates: Interstate X (I-X)
- US Highways: U.S. Route X (US X)
- State: State Road X (SR X)

System links
- Indiana State Highway System; Interstate; US; State; Scenic

The Indiana Department of Transportation (INDOT) is responsible for the establishment and classification of a state highway network which includes Interstate Highways, U.S. Highways, and State Roads. There is no rule preventing the same numbering between state roads, U.S. routes, and Interstate highways, although traditionally, INDOT has avoided state road numbers which are the same as those on U.S. routes within the state.

Indiana has a mileage cap of 12,000 miles (19,000 km) for its highway system.

== Business routes in Indiana ==
Many Indiana cities have business routes, but by law they are maintained by local governments, not INDOT.

== County roads in Indiana ==
Most Indiana counties use a numbering system for designating county roads based on a grid. The system is similar to latitude and longitude on the globe, where numbering begins at the Equator and Greenwich Prime Meridian, respectively.

Typically, the north–south road that divides the county into east and west parts is named "Meridian Road", or "Base Road", and the east–west road that divides the county into north and south parts is named "Division Road", just as the north–south street that divides Indianapolis between "east" and "west" is named Meridian Street. However, roads along the baselines are given a variety of names in different counties. For example, Rush County designates them both as Base Road. Howard County designates the east–west baseline road as 00 NS. Some Counties, like Gibson, use state roads or other highways as baselines. Gibson County uses US 41 and most of Indiana 64's route in the county as base roads.

Other roads in the county are identified by the distance (in miles) from the baseline, multiplied by 100, followed by the compass direction from the baseline. For example, road "200 E" would be a north–south road located 2 miles (3.2 km) east of the meridian line, and road "350 N" would be an east–west road located 3.5 miles (5.6 km) north of the division line. Roads along a county line may be given a grid designation or may be referred to as County Line Road.

Some county roads still run diagonally, or do not run in straight lines, even in gridded counties; these roads are usually given names rather than numbers. Such roads may also be given an arbitrary numeric designation: an example is NE 80 in Decatur County.

Roads in gridded counties also change names due to jogs in the road, although small jogs less than about 300 feet (90 m) are usually neglected. Road numbers using the ordinary system are seldom seen with digits other than 0 or 5 in the units place (hundredths of a mile); indeed, roads whose numeric designation is not divisible by 25 (one-quarter mile) are not common. Some counties, such as Hendricks end a county road's number with the digit of 1 if the road dead ends or has no outlet.

One reason for implementing this grid-based numbering system related to the 9-1-1 emergency system. The grid system allows a location to be identified much more quickly and accurately than the old system of road names and rural routes. (This interpretation may seem somewhat flawed, since there can be several of the same road numbers within a few miles of each other. But while it is possible to find several different 'E100N' roads, for example, the coordinate system of road naming does enable a location to be pinpointed on a map very quickly.)

Alternate grid systems are used in some counties, including systems starting at the edges of the county rather than bisecting lines. For example, Hamilton County continues the street numbering system of Indianapolis all the way across the county from south to north. 96th Street runs east–west along the Marion/Hamilton county line, and the grid continues with 10 "streets" to the mile up to 296th Street in the rural area at the Hamilton/Tipton line. North–south roads in Hamilton County have unsystematic names, although many road signs will indicate the distance east or west of the baseline along with the road name. Marshall County uses a grid that starts at the northern and eastern county lines. East–west roads are given an ordinal number (First Road, Second Road, etc.) or number and letter (1A, 3B, etc.) to indicate their distance south of the northern border, while north–south roads follow its northerly neighbor St. Joseph County's pattern and are named with tree names whose initial letter indicates the distance west of the eastern border (Apple, Beech, etc.) and with the last names of notable local people whose initial letter indicates the distance south of the northern border, although the subsequent letters are not systematic (Hawthorn is west of Hickory). Elkhart County uses a grid system like that of the state route system, except that the numbers for north–south odd-numbered roads increase west-to-east.

Some counties are not gridded. Due to the geography of counties such as Dearborn and Ohio Counties, this grid system is not practical to implement. The southern third of the state, which was not covered by glaciers during the Illinoian Stage and therefore retains an unglaciated landscape similar to central Kentucky, is too hilly for this. Gridding is also difficult or impossible in counties laid out under other quadrangular mapping systems such as the Vincennes Quadrangular, an older style of mapping system using a river for reference. This is the case in parts of Clark, Gibson, Knox, and Vanderburgh Counties. A similar system is used in parts of White County, where some roads around Lake Shafer indicate mileage from Norway Dam, which itself lies at mile 30.2 of the Tippecanoe River. For example, the road called 4.3 lies 4.3 miles from the dam.

== See also ==
- List of state roads in Indiana
- Numbered highways in the United States
- Indiana Toll Road
- St. Joseph Valley Parkway
