= Special routes of U.S. Route 31 =

Special routes of U.S. Route 31

Highway system
- United States Numbered Highway System; List; Special; Divided

Several special routes of U.S. Route 31 exist. In order from south to north they are as follows.

== Tennessee ==
=== Pulaski–Nashville alternate route ===
U.S. Route 31A
- Location: Pulaski–Nashville, Tennessee
- Length: 76.94 mi (123.82 km)

U.S. Route 31A (US 31A) is an alternate route of US 31 that exists between Pulaski and Nashville. It is located entirely in Middle Tennessee and except for the Lewisburg bypass, where it is concurrent with Tennessee State Route 106 (SR 106), it is entirely concurrent with unsigned SR 11.

=== Lewisburg business route ===
U.S. Route 31A Business
- Location: Lewisburg, Tennessee
- Length: 2.7 mi (4.3 km)

U.S. Route 31A Business (US 31A Business or US 31A Bus) is a Business route of U.S. Route 31A in Lewisburg, Tennessee, following US 31A's original alignment through downtown. It is concurrent with unsigned State Route 11 (SR 11) for its entire length.

=== Franklin truck route ===
U.S. Route 31 Truck
- Location: Franklin, Tennessee

U.S. Route 31 Truck (US 31 Truck) exists as truck route around the city of Franklin, Tennessee that is entirely concurrent with Tennessee State Route 397 (SR 397; Mack C Hatcher Parkway). At both of its termini, there are signs that show a US 31 Business through downtown Franklin, even though this is the mainline US 31 and this was actually done to draw traffic away from downtown Franklin.

=== Hendersonville bypass route ===
U.S. Route 31E Bypass
- Location: Hendersonville, Tennessee
- Existed: 1981–present

An unsigned portion consisting primarily of Tennessee State Route 386 is known as the U.S. Route 31E Bypass.

== Indiana ==
=== US 31A ===
U.S. Route 31A
- Location: Columbus–Seymour
- Existed: 1939–1980s

Former US 31A began at an interchange with US 31 where it traveled on Indianapolis Road and 11th Street. It followed State Road 46 on Brown Street (northbound) and Lindsay Street (southbound). South of Columbus, US 31A went through Jonesville, then passed through an interchange with Interstate 65, and terminated at US 50 in Seymour, Indiana. US 31A was deleted in Indiana in the 1980s, and State Road 11 was extended northward.

=== Peru business route ===
U.S. Route 31 Business
- Location: Peru
- Length: 5.2 mi (8.4 km)
- Existed: 1960s–present

Business US 31 in Miami County is a business spur serving the city of Peru. It begins at US 31 south of Peru, and when it reaches downtown Peru, it turns east onto Bus. US 24 (Main Street), then it turns north onto Broadway. It ends at US 24 (Hoosier Heartland Highway).

Major intersections
The entire route is in Miami County.

Location	mi	km	Destinations	Notes
Pipe Creek Township	0.00	0.00	US 31	Southern terminus; to be converted into interchange
Wabash River	2.0	3.2	Kelly Avenue Bridge	
Peru	2.2	3.5	Main Street west (US 24 Bus. west)	Southern end of Bus. US 24 concurrency
Peru	3.7	6.0	US 24 Bus. east (Main Street east) / SR 19	Northern end of Bus. US 24 concurrency
Peru	5.2	8.4	Hoosier Heartland Highway (US 24)	Northern terminus; road continues as Mexico Road
1.000 mi = 1.609 km; 1.000 km = 0.621 mi: Concurrency terminus

=== Plymouth alternate route ===
U.S. Route 31 Alternate
- Location: Plymouth
- Existed: 1963–1967

Alternate US 31 in Plymouth traveled along the Michigan Road, former US 31. It began at US 31 north of Plymouth, and terminated at US 31 south of Plymouth. It first appears on the 1964 Indiana State Highway Commission map (the previous edition shows a red line denoting a U.S. route but no marker) and last appears on the 1967–68 edition.

=== South Bend business route ===
U.S. Route 31 Business
- Location: South Bend
- Length: 11.9 mi (19.2 km)
- Existed: 1980–present

Business US 31 in South Bend follows the former US 31 north from the US 20/US 31/St. Joseph Valley Parkway interchange on the south side of the city, joining SR 933 south of downtown, then turns west along Cleveland Road just north of the Indiana Toll Road (Interstate 80/90) to return to US 31. The route had been planned to continue into Michigan along the former US 31 route which at the time carried US 33, but the Michigan Department of Transportation did not approve of the routing.

Major intersections
The entire route is in St. Joseph County.

Location	mi	km	Exit	Destinations	Notes
South Bend	0.00	0.00		US 31 south – Plymouth, Indianapolis	Continuation beyond southern terminus
South Bend	0.2	0.32	246A	US 20 east – Elkhart	Exit numbers follow US 31; no northbound exit
South Bend	0.2	0.32	246B	US 31 north / US 20 west – Niles MI	Northbound entrance (via US 31) and southbound exit
South Bend	3.0	4.8		SR 933 south / SR 23 (Sample Street)	Southern end of SR 933 concurrency
Roseland	6.2	10.0		I-80 / I-90 (Indiana Toll Road)	ITR exit 77
Roseland	7.1	11.4		SR 933 north	Northern end of SR 933 concurrency
South Bend	11.9	19.2		US 31 – Benton Harbor, Indiana Toll Road, Plymouth	Interchange; northern terminus; road continues west as Brick Road
1.000 mi = 1.609 km; 1.000 km = 0.621 mi: Concurrency terminus; Incomplete access; Tolled

== Michigan ==
There are five current, and three former, business routes for US 31 in Michigan. In addition, there was an alternate route in the state.
