= Indiana State Road 331 =

Highway in Indiana

State Road 331
- SR 331 highlighted in red

Route information
- Maintained by INDOT
- Length: 43.278 mi (69.649 km)

Major junctions
- South end: SR 25 near Tippecanoe
- US 30 in Bourbon; US 6 in Bremen; US 20 near Mishawaka I-80 Toll / I-90 Toll / Indiana Toll Road in Granger
- North end: SR 23 in Granger

Location
- Country: United States
- State: Indiana

Highway system
- Indiana State Highway System; Interstate; US; State; Scenic
← SR 329	→ SR 332

State Road 331 (SR 331) is a state highway in the north-central part of the U.S. state of Indiana.

== Route description ==
State Road 331 runs from State Road 25 north of Rochester via Bourbon, Bremen and Mishawaka to State Road 23 just north of the Indiana Toll Road (Interstate 80/Interstate 90). The SR 331 designation northward from the St. Joseph Valley Parkway (US 20) is prescribed by state law, as are the locations of the intersections within this section.

== History ==
SR 331 first appeared on the February 1933 edition of the Indiana State Highway Commission map of the state highway system, running from SR 25 in the south to SR 2 (later US 33 then SR 933) in the north. By 1953 it had been extended northward to US 20 (later Business US 20). Between 1980 and 1987 SR 331 was routed east of downtown Mishawaka. In June 1999 it was relocated eastward north of the St. Joseph Valley Parkway (US 20) in anticipation of a highway upgrade there which had been completed in part. Although by law the entire project was to have been completed by January 1, 2009, in reality it was finished by September 30, 2013. Subsequently, in August 2014 the Indiana Department of Transportation relinquished the parallel portions of the route which it had acquired in 1999.

== Major intersections ==
County	Location	mi	km	Destinations	Notes
Marshall	Tippecanoe Township	0.000	0.000	SR 25 – Rochester, Warsaw	Southern terminus of SR 331
Marshall	Tippecanoe Township	5.021	8.081	SR 10	
Marshall	Bourbon	8.489	13.662	Lincoln Highway (Old US 30)	
Marshall	Bourbon	9.625– 9.780	15.490– 15.739	US 30 – Plymouth, Warsaw	
Marshall	Bremen	19.865	31.970	SR 106 east	Eastern end of SR 106 concurrency
Marshall	Bremen	20.762	33.413	SR 106 west	Western end of SR 106 concurrency
Marshall	Bremen	21.794	35.074	US 6 – Westville, Nappanee	
St. Joseph	Penn Township	33.174– 33.235	53.388– 53.487	US 20 west – South Bend	Western end of US 20 concurrency
St. Joseph	Penn Township	35.238– 35.344	56.710– 56.881	US 20 east – Elkhart	Eastern end of US 20 concurrency
St. Joseph	Mishawaka	37.928	61.039	SR 933	
St. Joseph	Granger	42.951	69.123	I-80 Toll / I-90 Toll / Indiana Toll Road	
St. Joseph	Granger	43.278	69.649	SR 23 – South Bend, Granger	Northern terminus of SR 331
1.000 mi = 1.609 km; 1.000 km = 0.621 mi: Concurrency terminus
