= Transportation in South Bend, Indiana =

- Location of South Bend within Indiana

Overview
- Locale: South Bend-Mishawaka metropolitan area
- Transit type: commuter rail, bus and bus rapid transit, bicycle sharing system, taxicab
- Annual ridership: ▼ ~5.4 million (compilation of modes)

Operation
- Operators: South Bend Transportation Corporation (TRANSPO), St. Joseph County Airport Authority, Indiana Department of Transportation, Indiana Toll Road Concession Company, and South Bend Public Works Department, Northern Indiana Commuter Transportation District

Transportation in South Bend, Indiana currently relies heavily on road and highway infrastructure. South Bend's primary airport is South Bend International Airport, located northwest of downtown. It also has multiple rail lines and stations for freight and passenger travel. These are all interconnected by the city's private bus transit corporation; TRANSPO.

== History ==
On May 25, 1885, a horse-drawn wagon moved people up and down Washington Avenue. This was the start of official public transportation in South Bend. Later that same year, electric streetcars were delivered to city streets. Streetcars continued to serve residents until 1940, when gasoline-powered automobiles took over. Bus transportation was dominated by the Northern Indiana Transit until 1967.

=== 1968–present ===
In 1969, eager for a new bus system, the City of South Bend purchased a bus for the new private transit startup, South Bend Transportation Corporation. After a local contest, the service and corporation behind it were thus nicknamed "TRANSPO." Service by TRANSPO expanded over the years, and in 1998 they opened their state of the art South Street Station.

== Road Infrastructure ==
=== Roads and Bridges ===
While many streets follow a simple grid plan, others have adapted to match the natural shape of the St. Joseph River. Roads are property of the City of South Bend and are maintained by the Public Works Department. Bridges, on the other hand, of which there are a dozen, vary in terms of ownership. Most are in control of St. Joseph County.

=== Highways ===
The St. Joseph Valley Parkway (a 56.34 stretch of roadway which consists of segments of U.S. Route 31 and U.S. Route 20) allows for commuters to bypass the downtown areas of South Bend and Mishawaka as well as the residential areas that lie in between. This is often simply called "the bypass" for just that reason. It connects the predominantly suburban areas of east South Bend and Mishawaka to the airport without the traffic jams and stops centered in downtown South Bend.

Interstate 90 intersects the Parkway and connects South Bend to Seattle and Logan International Airport in Boston. It also travels through or near many important cities; Cleveland, Upstate New York, Chicago, and Madison, Wisconsin for example.

== Rail ==
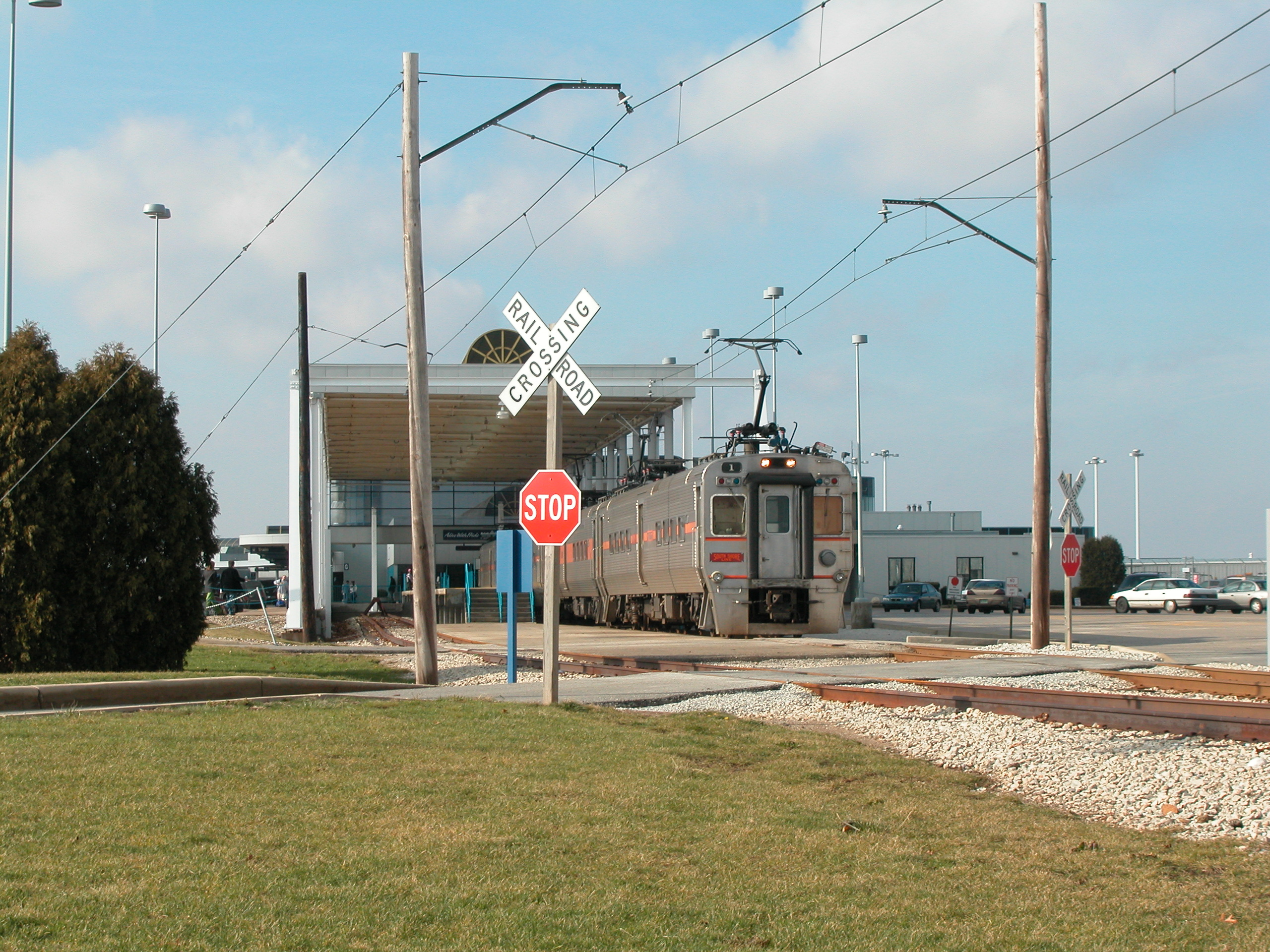
A South Shore Line train departs the Airport Station

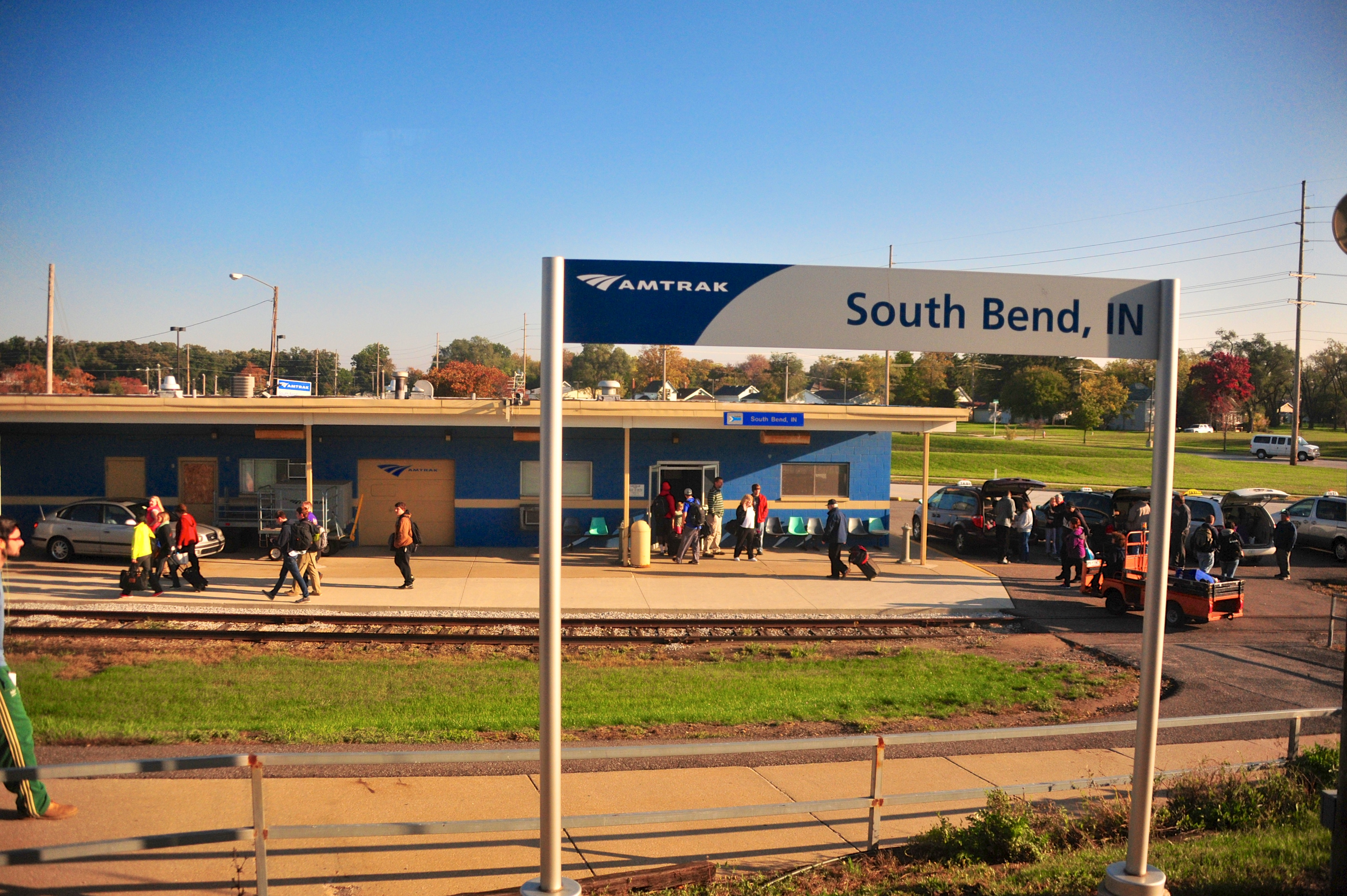
The local Amtrak station

The South Shore Line connects the South Bend International Airport to Millennium Station in Chicago, Illinois. Electric commuter trains pass through towns such as Michigan City, Indiana and Gary, Indiana This journey takes approximately 1 hour 55 minutes. There is a proposal to extend the tracks southwest to a new terminus in downtown South Bend or even Elkhart, Indiana.

Amtrak's Lake Shore Limited operates two trains everyday through South Bend Station while en route to Chicago via New York City or Boston. Capitol Limited offers service to Washington D.C. The station (of which there is only one in South Bend) saw a rise in passenger numbers by 2.01%, with 21,818 riders in 2017.

In 2021, a local task force proposed that electric streetcars be brought back to South Bend. South Bend claims to have had the first electric streetcars in the country. The project has become known as RiverRail, a reference to the nearby river. The tram and line would have a hefty price tag, but newly allocated state and federal funding could bring costs down for the city. The system would likely cost US$55 million per mile of track.

== Bus Service ==
=== Public Transit ===
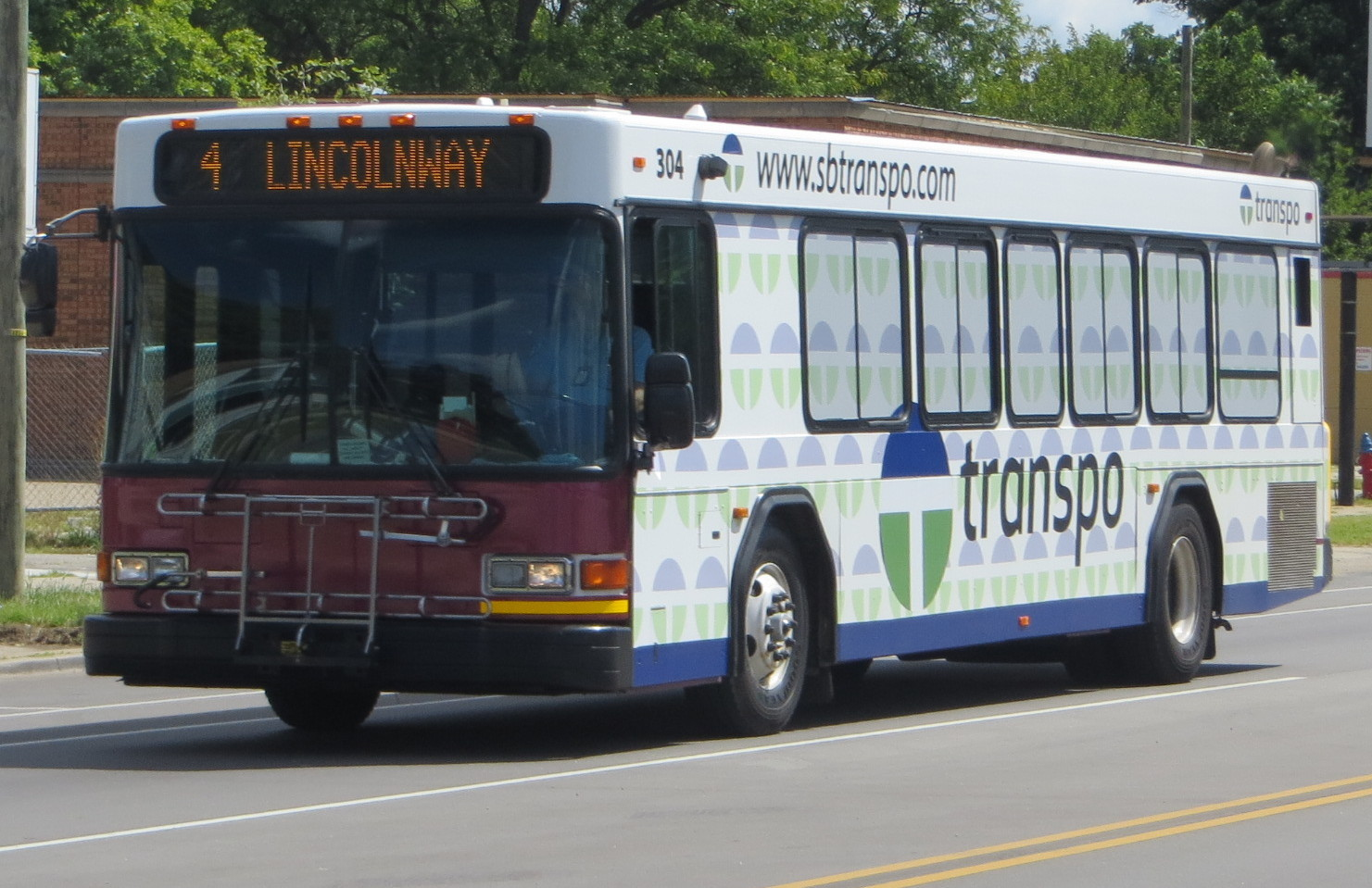
A Transpo bus

Bus service in South Bend is controlled by the South Bend Public Transportation Corporation, (Commonly known and marketed as TRANSPO). It has multiple routes connecting many parts of St. Joseph County. The South Street Station serves as its hub, with buses arriving and offering transfers to other lines frequently. At Twin Branch Park, connections can be made with the Interurban Trolley, which connects Mishawaka to Elkhart.

In 2014, TRANSPO began to replace their Gillig Low Floor buses with newer, cleaner, New Flyer Xcelsior buses, which use compressed natural gas technologies.

There are, as of 2021, 1,002 bus stops and 24 separate routes offered by TRANSPO. While TRANSPO's ridership and funding have been steadily dropping, many view the agency as a necessity, as it has helped connect and revitalize the west side of the city.

=== Intercity Bus Service ===
Greyhound busses operated out of the airport until 2019, when they relocated to a leased portion of the South Street Station.

== Aviation ==
South Bend International Airport (SBN) is the city's main airfield. It has three operational runways, and served nearly 420,000 passengers and 23.4 million pounds of cargo in 2019. Most passengers use the airport as a shuttle service to larger airports such as Chicago O’Hare International Airport, which services more destinations. FedEx transports millions of pounds of cargo each year to their largest hub in the world, Memphis, Tennessee, as well as Indianapolis, Indiana and Fort Wayne, Indiana. From 2001 to 2014, it was known as "South Bend Regional Airport." It welcomed its first international commercial flight in 2019. On the Boeing 747 aircraft was the Liverpool Football Club, arriving for a match against the University of Notre Dame.

== Cycling ==
Former Mayor of South Bend and the Secretary of Transportation under the Biden administration, Pete Buttigieg, implemented a plan to encourage commuting by bike. This included the implementation of many bike lanes in downtown South Bend. The city has been rated as one of the most bike friendliest places in the U.S Lime once had a large presence in South Bend, however, the company announced in 2019 that it would be departing from the city. This was a surprise to residents because many depend on the ride sharing system as their only formal mode of transport. In 2018, the company reported a total of 293,000 rides on its bicycles and electric scooters.
