= Indiana State Road 23 =

Highway in Indiana

State Road 23
- SR 23 highlighted in red

Route information
- Maintained by INDOT
- Length: 50.871 mi (81.869 km)

Major junctions
- South end: SR 10 near Culver
- US 30 at Grovertown; US 6 at Walkerton; US 20 near South Bend; US 31 in South Bend; SR 331 near Granger
- North end: M-62 at Michigan state line

Location
- Country: United States
- State: Indiana
- Counties: Starke, St. Joseph

Highway system
- Indiana State Highway System; Interstate; US; State; Scenic
← SR 22	→ US 24

State Road 23 is a highway in the north-central part of the U.S. state of Indiana. In practice it runs from the southwest to the northeast, though it is designated as a north–south route. It is an undivided surface road.

== Route description ==
Indiana State Road 23 (SR 23) begins about 2.5 miles (4.0 km) east of the northeastern shore of Bass Lake in Starke County at the intersection of State Road 10 and County Road 900E. From there, it heads north toward Grovertown, where it intersects US 30. SR 23 continues north until Walkerton in the extreme southwestern corner of St. Joseph County, where it meets US 6. After a very brief concurrency with that route, SR 23 departs town to the north, then quickly turns northeast toward South Bend, passing through North Liberty. As it enters the South Bend metropolitan area, SR 23 has an interchange with US 20/US 31 (the St. Joseph Valley Parkway). It then traverses the city of South Bend from southwest to northeast, passing very near the campus of the University of Notre Dame. After crossing under the Indiana East-West Toll Road (I-80/I-90) without providing any access, SR 23 parallels that tollway briefly before reaching an intersection with SR 331, which does provide access to the Toll Road (at its Exit 83). From there SR 23 proceeds northeast into the town of Granger before it curves due north to reach the Michigan state line.

== History ==
Prior to 1926, the SR 23 designation went from SR 13, north of Pennville, to SR 21, north of Portland. When the Indiana State Highway Commission renumbered most of the state roads in 1926 the SR 23 designation went unused at the time. It wasn't until late 1930 when the SR 23 designation was used again along its modern routing between US 30, in Grovertown and M-62 at the Michigan state line. This segment of roadway becomes a high type of driving surface between 1939 and 1941. The road was extended south from US 30 to SR 10 in either 1950 or 1951. This section of roadway was paved between 1963 and 1964.

== Major intersections ==
County	Location	mi	km	Destinations	Notes
Starke	North Bend Township	0.000	0.000	SR 10	Southern terminus of SR 23
Starke	Washington Township	4.021	6.471	SR 8 – Knox	
Starke	Grovertown	10.826	17.423	US 30 / Lincoln Highway – Plymouth, Valparaiso	
St. Joseph	Walkerton	18.542	29.840	US 6 east – Bremen	Southern end of US 6 concurrency
St. Joseph	Walkerton	18.678	30.059	US 6 west – Westville	Northern end of US 6 concurrency
St. Joseph	North Liberty	24.442	39.336	SR 4 – Potato Creek State Park	
St. Joseph	South Bend	35.697– 35.803	57.449– 57.619	US 20 / US 31 / St. Joseph Valley Parkway – Mishawaka, Niles	
St. Joseph	South Bend	38.708	62.294	SR 933 north / Main Street	Western end of SR 933 concurrency
St. Joseph	South Bend	39.556	63.659	SR 933 south / Lincolnway East – Mishawaka	Eastern end of SR 933 concurrency
St. Joseph	South Bend	39.861	64.150	Mishawaka Avenue	interchange
St. Joseph	Granger	46.807	75.329	SR 331 south to I-80 Toll / I-90 Toll	
St. Joseph	Granger	50.871	81.869	M-62 north – Edwardsburg	Northern terminus of SR 23; Michigan State Line
1.000 mi = 1.609 km; 1.000 km = 0.621 mi: Concurrency terminus
