= St. Joseph Valley Parkway =

Freeway in Indiana and Michigan

- St. Joseph Valley Parkway highlighted in red

Route information
- Maintained by INDOT, MDOT
- Length: 56.34 mi (Note: Total mileage is a summation of the state mileages.) (90.67 km)
- Component highways: US 20 from Elkhart, IN to South Bend, IN; US 31 from South Bend, IN to near Benton Harbor, MI

Major junctions
- East end: US 20 near Elkhart, IN
- US 31 in South Bend, IN; US 20 in South Bend, IN; I-80 / I-90 / Indiana Toll Road in South Bend, IN; US 12 near Niles, MI
- North end: I-94 near Benton Harbor, MI

Location
- Country: United States
- States: Indiana, Michigan
- Counties: IN: Elkhart, St. Joseph MI: Berrien

Highway system
- United States Numbered Highway System; List; Special; Divided
- Indiana State Highway System; Interstate; US; State; Scenic
- Michigan State Trunkline Highway System; Interstate; US; State; Byways

The St. Joseph Valley Parkway is a freeway in the U.S. states of Indiana and Michigan, serving as a bypass route around Elkhart, Mishawaka, and South Bend in Indiana and Niles in Michigan. The freeway runs to the south and west of Elkhart and South Bend and Niles and consists of segments of U.S. Route 31 (US 31) and US 20; those two highway designations run concurrently at the southwestern rim of the South Bend metropolitan area. It continues north to run along the St. Joseph River valley.

The freeway was first built in Indiana in the 1960s, although plans in Michigan date back to the 1950s. Indiana completed its portion of the freeway in 1992, while Michigan opened its last segment in 2022.

== Route description ==
The Parkway begins where US 20 expands to a divided highway southeast of Elkhart. To the east in Indiana the freeway feeds into an undivided segment of US 20 at County Road 17 (CR 17). From there it runs westward along the south sides of Elkhart and Mishawaka. South of South Bend, US 31 joins the Parkway, and then the Parkway turns northward along the west side of South Bend. Along this segment, US 20 turns back west and leaves the Parkway. The Parkway meets the Indiana Toll Road which carries I-80/I-90 before crossing the state line into Michigan. West of Niles, the Parkway meets US 12 and continues northwesterly running west of Berrien Springs. From there it runs northward to end at I-94 east of Benton Harbor.

The Indiana Department of Transportation (INDOT) and the Michigan Department of Transportation (MDOT) both maintain the sections of the St. Joseph Valley Parkway in their respective states. Additionally, both departments have listed their freeway segments as part of the National Highway System, a system of roads important to the nation's economy, defense, and mobility. The two departments conduct surveys to measure the traffic levels along their roadways. This measurement is expressed in terms of annual average daily traffic (AADT) which is a calculation of the traffic volume on a stretch of roadway for any average day of the year. INDOT's figures for 2007 showed that 30,753 vehicles used the freeway near its western end. The traffic volume drops to 19,914 vehicles near the Indiana Toll Road. In Michigan, the levels drop as low as 7,402 vehicles near the Napier Road interchange.

== History ==
=== Name ===
The "St. Joseph Valley Parkway" name was chosen by local chambers of commerce in the fall of 1992 as the result of a local contest held by a group of local businesses. The name was officially adopted by Michigan in 1993 (dedicated late 1995) and Indiana in 1995 (dedicated in mid-1995).

=== Indiana section ===
There had been a southern bypass of the South Bend and Elkhart areas planned since the 1930s. The first section of the highway, started in 1958 as Bypass US 20 (BYP US 20), was completed between US 20 and Mayflower Road (at the time State Road 123) on September 19, 1963. The freeway was extended to just past the SR 23 interchange in late Summer 1965, then further east to US 31, that section opening on December 15, 1967. The BYP US 20 designation was replaced by the US 31 designation in 1978. The exit with the Indiana East–West Toll Road/I-80/I-90 was built beginning in 1979 in conjunction with the northern extension to Michigan. Construction in the early 1990s extended the freeway in sections from US 31/Business US 31 (Bus. US 31) to its current end with US 20 at CR 17, with the portion from US 31/Bus. US 31 to SR 19 opening on December 11, 1991, and the portion from there to CR 17 opening on October 9, 1992. Ramps from Nimtz Parkway were opened November 3, 1997, and the portion in Elkhart was also named the "Dean R. Mock Expressway" in March 2002.

=== Michigan section ===
A plan to relocate US 31 in Berrien County, Michigan, existed as early as 1952. Planning to extend the South Bend Bypass northward into Michigan to I-96 (later I-196) began in 1962. A report issued in 1970 detailed four routing corridors, spawning a lawsuit over how Berrien Springs would be bypassed. Construction was to begin in 1975, but the Michigan State Highways Department delayed construction plans in 1972, pushing the start to 1977. The first section, running from the state line north to US 12, was completed and dedicated August 10, 1979, and opened to traffic by September 6 of that year. From there, US 31 was routed east along US 12 to Bus. US 12 and north along Bus. US 12 to the former routing of US 31/US 33. Final plans for the routing north to I-94 were approved in 1981. The Niles bypass section was opened August 16, 1987, bringing the freeway north to Walton Road northwest of Niles. Bus. US 31 was created along the former routing in Niles and Walton Road was rebuilt as a state trunkline connection between the northern end of the freeway and the former two-lane routing of US 31. The Berrien Springs bypass section was opened in late 1992, the southbound lanes opening on October 23 and the northbound on November 20. As a cost-saving measure, this section was initially an expressway with crossroads, and was converted to a freeway in stages through 1999. Since then, MDOT built a 9.1-mile (14.6 km) freeway segment north to Napier Avenue that was opened on August 27, 2003 at a cost of $97 million (equivalent to $158 million in 2024). A proposed spur westward to I-94 in the Stevensville area was never built.

==== Extension to I-94 ====
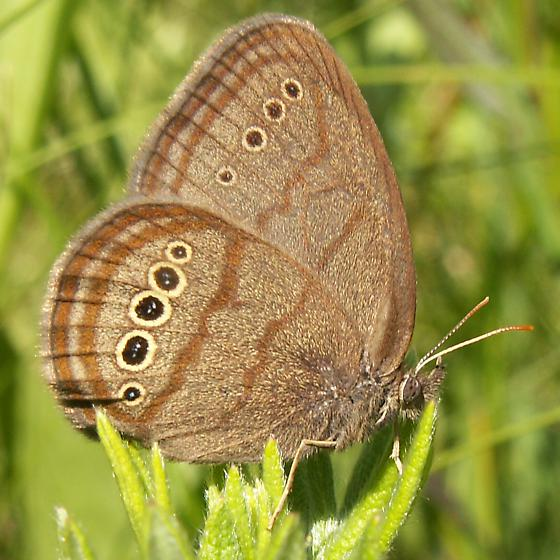
Mitchell's satyr

East of Benton Harbor, Michigan, the St. Joseph Valley Parkway extension was under study due to environmental, economical and historical site issues. One of the environmental concerns relates to the habitat of an endangered species, the Mitchell's satyr butterfly that has its habitat in the area of the freeway extension. The 40-acre (16 ha) habitat is home to the second-largest population of the rare butterfly. This freeway connection was originally approved in 1981 as part of a final environmental impact study that included the freeway built from Niles northward to Napier Avenue. Since that approval, the butterfly was discovered in the Blue Creek Fen in the late 1980s, and it was listed an endangered species in 1992. The listing stalled construction of the freeway north of Berrien Springs. The US Fish and Wildlife Service (USFWS) issued an opinion two years later that the freeway project would jeopardize the species. MDOT was given permission to modify the previously approved freeway to cross the Blue Creek on longer bridges; the USFWS also required that any construction be done from elevated platforms, among other restrictions. In the interim, MDOT proceeded with construction of the southern portion of the last freeway segment, completing the freeway northward from Berrien Springs to the Napier Avenue interchange in August 2003.

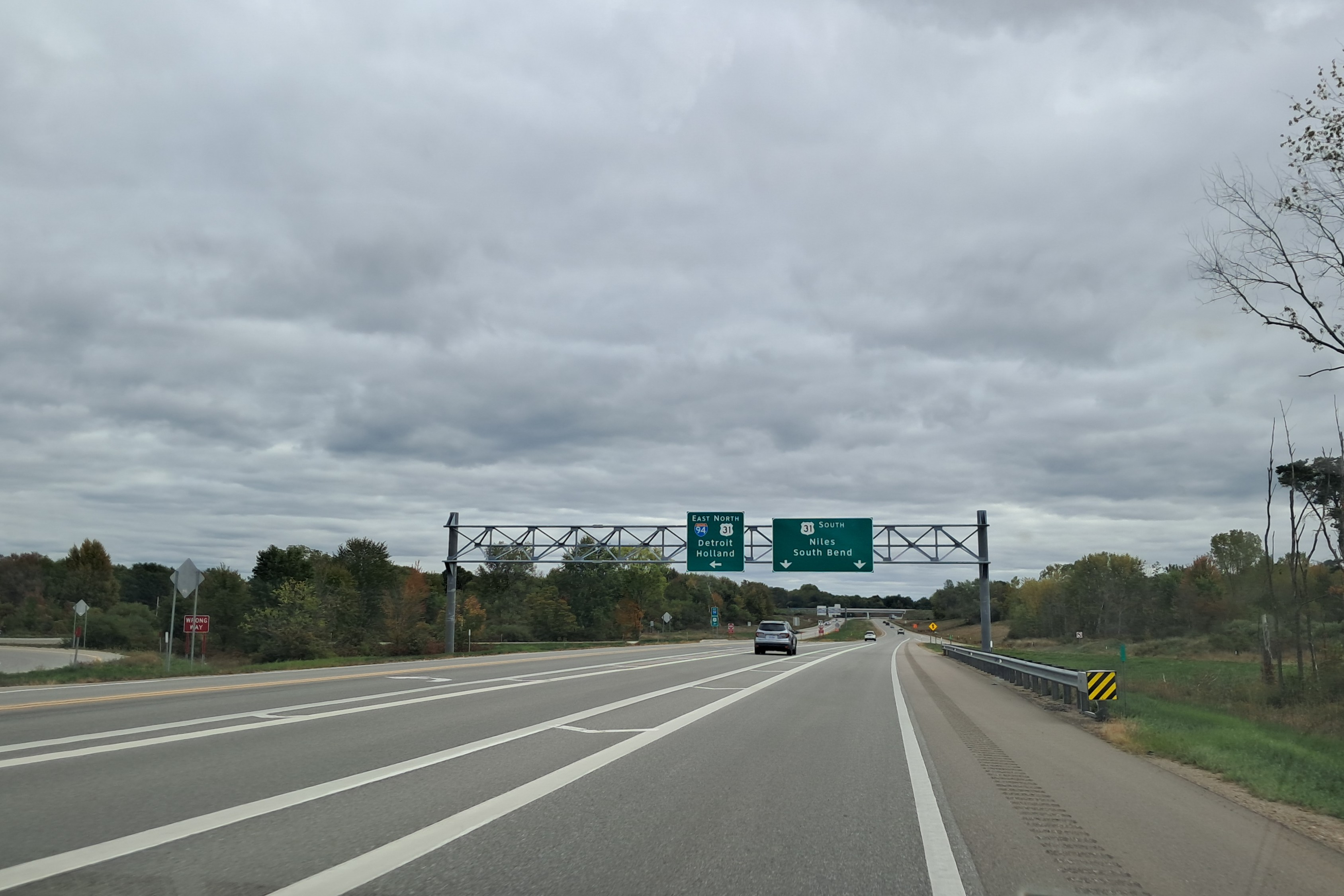
The newest section of the Parkway at an interchange with I-94/BL I-94

A revised environmental impact study to account for the butterfly's habitat was approved in 2004. The study compared the original proposal for this extension that involved connecting directly to I-196 at I-94 with a pair of alternate routes that involved connecting US 31 directly to BL I-94 at I-94 near Benton Harbor with auxiliary lanes to I-196. The recommendation was to use the PA-2 version of the alternative connection to avoid the Blue Creek Fen. At the time the last freeway segment was opened in 2003, MDOT expected the remaining segment would not take much longer to complete, but funding was not available for many years. Construction of the extension was not included for this reason in subsequent MDOT five-year highway projects plans, although most of the design work and land acquisition was identified in 2013 as having been finished. Funding for the project was listed in the 2017–21 plan draft released in July 2016, which split the remaining work into three phases. MDOT received a federal grant for the project in December 2018, citing at that time a completion date of 2022 or 2023 for the project; construction began in June 2020. The ribbon cutting for this section occurred on September 26, 2022. The new routing to I-94 formally opened on November 9, 2022. Until the freeway was completed, US 31 followed a stretch of Napier Avenue, which was upgraded in conjunction with the St. Joseph Valley Parkway opening to that point, westward to I-94. This stretch of Napier remained state trunkline until 2023. The St. Joseph Valley Parkway name was applied to the new freeway section.

== Exit list ==
State	County	Location	mi (Note: Milepost numbers reset at the Indiana–Michigan state line crossing. In Indiana concurrent sections and exits use the US 20 mileposts which increase to the east.)	km	Exit	Destinations	Notes
Indiana	Elkhart	Jefferson–Concord township line	98.65	158.76	-	US 20 east – Angola CR 17 to I-80 / I-90 / Indiana Toll Road; Old US 20 – Elkhart	Eastern terminus as US 20 becomes a freeway
Indiana	Elkhart	Elkhart	95.55	153.77	-	US 33 south – Elkhart, Goshen	Northern terminus of US 33
Indiana	Elkhart	Concord–Baugo township line	92.04	148.12	-	SR 19 – Wakarusa, Nappanee, Elkhart	
Indiana	St. Joseph	Penn Township	84.75	136.39	84	SR 331 north (Elm Road)	Eastern end of SR 331 concurrency
Indiana	St. Joseph	Penn Township	82.75	133.17	82	SR 331 south (Bremen Highway)	Western end of SR 331 concurrency
Indiana	St. Joseph	South Bend	81.27	130.79	80	Ironwood Drive	
Indiana	St. Joseph	South Bend	78.47– 78.83	126.29– 126.86	79	US 31 Bus. north (Michigan Street) US 31 south – Plymouth, Indianapolis	Southern end of US 20/US 31 concurrency; milepost 253.94 on US 31
Indiana	St. Joseph	South Bend	76.08	122.44	76	SR 23 – North Liberty, South Bend	
Indiana	St. Joseph	Portage Township	74.38	119.70	75	Mayflower Road	Northbound only exit for westbound traffic
Indiana	St. Joseph	Portage Township	72.51– 72.88	116.69– 117.29	73	SR 2 (Western Avenue) – La Porte	
Indiana	St. Joseph	South Bend	70.53 253.75	113.51 408.37	254	US 20 west – New Carlisle; Lincoln Way – South Bend International Airport	Northern end of US 20/US 31 concurrency
Indiana	St. Joseph	South Bend	254.98	410.35	255A	Nimtz Parkway	
Indiana	St. Joseph	South Bend	255.12	410.58	255B	I-80 / I-90 / Indiana Toll Road	Exit 72 on Indiana Toll Road
Indiana	St. Joseph	South Bend	255.9	411.8	256	US 31 Bus. south (Cleveland Road / Brick Road)	
			257.6 0.000	414.6 0.000	Indiana–Michigan state line		
Michigan	Berrien	Bertrand Township	3.287	5.290	3	US 12 – Sturgis, New Buffalo	
Michigan	Berrien	Niles Charter Township	4.852	7.809	5	Niles–Buchanan Road	
Michigan	Berrien	Niles Charter Township	6.777	10.907	7	Walton Road	Former Bus. US 31
Michigan	Berrien	Oronoko Charter Township	12.987	20.901	13	Snow Road – Berrien Springs	
Michigan	Berrien	Oronoko Charter Township	15.474	24.903	15	M-139 – Berrien Springs	Former US 31/US 33
Michigan	Berrien	Sodus Township	18.080	29.097	18	Tabor Road	
Michigan	Berrien	Sodus Township	21.938	35.306	22	Sodus Parkway	
Michigan	Berrien	Benton Charter Township	24.441	39.334	24	Napier Avenue	
Michigan	Berrien	Benton Charter Township			27	I-94 / US 31 north to I-196 – Chicago, Detroit; BL I-94 – Downtown Benton Harbor	Opened November 9, 2022
1.000 mi = 1.609 km; 1.000 km = 0.621 mi: Concurrency terminus
