= Interstate 80/90 =

Interstate 80/90 exists as a concurrency as:

- Indiana Toll Road, from Lake Station to the Ohio state line
- Ohio Turnpike, from the Indiana state line to Elyria Township
