= Indiana State Road 311 =

Decommissioned state highway in Indiana

State Road 311
- SR 311 highlighted in red

Route information
- Maintained by INDOT
- Length: 7.24 mi (11.65 km)
- Existed: 1980–January 28, 2013

Major junctions
- South end: Charlestown Road in New Albany
- I-265 / SR 62
- North end: US 31 near Sellersburg

Location
- Country: United States
- State: Indiana
- Counties: Clark, Floyd

Highway system
- Indiana State Highway System; Interstate; US; State; Scenic
← SR 301	→ SR 312

State Road 311 (SR 311) was a short southwest-to-northeast route in the southeastern part of the U.S. state of Indiana.

== Route description ==
State Road 311 ran for five-miles (8 km) from Interstate 265 north of New Albany to U.S. Route 31 near Interstate 65 in Sellersburg. In Floyd County the road ran along what is known as Charlestown Road.

== History ==
A two-mile (3 km) stretch south of Interstate 265 was decommissioned by the state and maintenance was turned over to the city of New Albany. In October 2012, the portion of SR 311 in Clark County was given to the county. The remainder of the route was given back to Floyd County on January 28, 2013.

=== U.S. Route 31W ===
SR 311 was signed as US 31W until 1980. When US 31W was removed from the area, INDOT renumbered the route as SR 311. The bridge that carried US 31W over the Ohio River from Louisville, Kentucky, the Kentucky & Indiana Terminal Bridge, has not carried vehicle traffic since I-64 was built in downtown New Albany.

== Major intersections ==
County	Location	mi	km	Destinations	Notes
Floyd	New Albany	0.00	0.00	Charlestown Road	Southern terminus
Floyd	New Albany	0.33– 0.53	0.53– 0.85	I-265 / SR 62	I-265 exit 4
Clark	Sellersburg	5.96	9.59	SR 60	
Clark	Sellersburg	6.73– 7.16	10.83– 11.52	I-65 – Indianapolis, Louisville	I-65 exit 9
Clark	Sellersburg	7.24	11.65	US 31 – Jeffersonville, Scottsburg	Northern terminus
1.000 mi = 1.609 km; 1.000 km = 0.621 mi
