= Indiana Toll Road Concession Company =

- Company type: Subsidiary concession company
- Industry: Toll road
- Founded: June 30, 2006; 18 years ago
- Headquarters: Elkhart, Indiana
- Parent: IFM Investors
- Website: www.indianatollroad.org

ITR Concession Company LLC (ITRCC) is a subsidiary of IFM Investors that operates and maintains the Indiana East–West Toll Road. ITRCC has its headquarters in Elkhart, Indiana. ITRCC assumed this responsibility from the Indiana Department of Transportation on June 30, 2006, in accordance with a 75-year lease agreement, included as part of the 2005 "Major Moves" legislation proposed by Governor Mitch Daniels and enacted by the Indiana General Assembly in November 2005.

On September 22, 2014, ITRCC announced it had filed Chapter 11 bankruptcy, and that a sale process for the asset would commence. IFM Investors on March 11, 2015, announced that it had entered into a $5.725 billion agreement for the right to operate the Indiana Toll Road and collect toll revenue. On May 27, 2015, IFM announced it had reached financial close on its acquisition of ITRCC, and thus inherited the remaining 66 years of the concession lease agreement.
