= Indiana Toll Road =

Section of Interstate Highway in Indiana, United States

Indiana Toll Road
- Indiana East–West Toll Road
- Indiana Toll Road highlighted in green

Route information
- Maintained by ITRCC
- Length: 156.28 mi (251.51 km)
- Existed: 1956–present
- Component highways: I-90 entire length; I-80 from Lake Station to Ohio state line

Major junctions
- West end: I-90 Toll / Chicago Skyway at the Illinois state line in Whiting
- US 41 in Hammond; I-65 / US 12 / US 20 in Gary; I-80 / I-94 / US 6 / SR 51 in Lake Station; US 421 near Michigan City; US 31 in South Bend; US 131 near Middlebury; I-69 near Angola
- East end: I-80 Toll / I-90 Toll / Ohio Turnpike at the Ohio state line near Angola

Location
- Country: United States
- State: Indiana
- Counties: Lake, Porter, LaPorte, St. Joseph, Elkhart, LaGrange, Steuben

Highway system
- Indiana State Highway System; Interstate; US; State; Scenic
- Interstate Highway System; Main; Auxiliary; Suffixed; Business; Future
← I-80	I-90	→ I-94

The Indiana Toll Road, officially the Indiana East–West Toll Road, is a controlled-access toll road that runs for 156.28 miles (251.51 km) east–west across northern Indiana from the Illinois state line to the Ohio state line. It has been advertised as the "Main Street of the Midwest". The entire toll road is designated as part of Interstate 90 (I-90), and the segment from Lake Station east to the Ohio state line (which comprises over 85 percent of the route) is a concurrency with I-80. The toll road is owned by the Indiana Finance Authority and operated by the Indiana Toll Road Concession Company (ITRCC), which is owned by IFM Investors.

== Route description ==
The Indiana Toll Road is part of the Interstate Highway System which runs 156.28 miles (251.51 km) through Indiana connecting the Chicago Skyway to the Ohio Turnpike. The toll road is signed with I-90 for its entire length, as well as I-80 east of Lake Station, after having run concurrently with I-94.

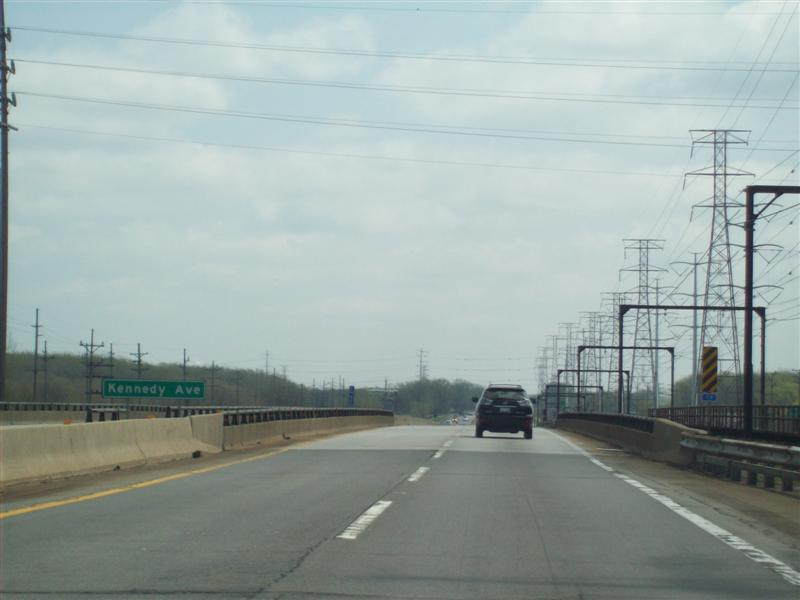
Indiana Toll Road, East Chicago, Indiana, at Kennedy Avenue

Exit points are based on the milepost system, with exits starting at 0 at the Illinois state line and increasing to exit 153 at the Eastpoint toll barrier near the Ohio state line (technically, not an exit, as the only road accessible from there is the Ohio Turnpike, but toll tickets issued at the barrier are marked "Entry 153"). The Toll Road opened in 1956 with sequential exit numbering, which was converted to the current mileage-based scheme in 1981. The original number sequence was amended slightly in 1964 with the opening of the then-Burns Harbor, now Lake Station, exit.

The farthest it gets from the Michigan state line or Lake Michigan is about 10 miles (16 km). At one point in Northern Indiana, in Greenfield Township, LaGrange County, at mile 132, the toll road comes within about 200 yards (180 m), or 0.1 miles (0.16 km), from the Michigan border.

Control cities on guide signs are Chicago and Ohio. Originally, they were "Chicago and West" and "Ohio and East".

== History ==
Longtime version of the Indiana Toll Road's logo, still in use on many guide signs on the Indiana Toll Road and Chicago Skyway

Older version

The Toll Road was publicly financed and constructed during the 1950s. It opened in stages, east to west, between August and November 1956. The formal dedication ceremony was held on September 17, 1956.

The final course of the Toll Road was the northern of four planned alignments. In addition to the east–west toll road, a north–south toll road was planned, roughly along the path of today's I-65, but the plan was dropped after the Federal-Aid Highway Act of 1956 was passed.

Originally, the I-94 designation was applied to the highway west of where the current interchange with I-94 was eventually built, and I-90 followed I-80 to the west along the Borman Expressway as I-94 does now; the completed portion of the Borman Expressway was designated as I-80, I-90, and I-294. The current routing became effective around 1965, to avoid the confusion that had resulted from I-80, I-90, and I-94 all changing roadways there. As a result, a stretch of I-94 is actually farther south than I-90, and I-90 runs the entire length of the Toll Road. I-294 was also cut back to the Tri-State Tollway at that time and thus no longer enters Indiana.

Several interchanges on the Toll Road were constructed between 1980 and 1985 as part of a bond sale in October 1980.

The Indiana Toll Road Commission operated the toll road from its inception until 1981. The Indiana Department of Transportation (INDOT) operated the toll road between 1981 and 2006. On April 1, 1983, the State of Indiana established the Indiana Toll Finance Authority, which was renamed the Indiana Transportation Finance Authority in April 1988. It was consolidated with several other state financial agencies and renamed the Indiana Finance Authority in May 2005. From its inception in 1983, the Indiana Finance Authority has maintained ownership of the Toll Road (and other state-owned highways in Indiana), while its operations and maintenance have evolved over time, starting with INDOT until transitioning to the ITRCC in 2006.

=== Cintra-Macquarie and Major Moves ===
Upon taking office in 2005, Governor Mitch Daniels began looking for ways to fund a backlog of Indiana highway maintenance and construction. Working with Goldman Sachs, who was reported to have earned some $20 million (equivalent to $31.6 million in 2025) in fees, the state requested bids to lease the Toll Road in exchange for the right to maintain, operate, and collect tolls for the following 75 years.

A consortium made up of the construction firm Cintra of Spain and Macquarie Atlas Roads of Australia, the same firms that had taken over the Chicago Skyway in 2004, submitted the winning bid of $3.8 billion (equivalent to $6.2 billion in 2025). Their bid was $1 billion (equivalent to $1.63 billion in 2025) more than the next highest bid. The deal was completed on June 29, 2006, and the two companies formed the ITRCC to operate the road.

Under the contract, tolls could not be increased until 2010, and Indiana residents using a transponder would not pay higher tolls until 2016. Annual toll increases were limited to the greater of 2%, the rate of inflation, or the rate of increase in the GDP.

Opponents of the proposal filed a lawsuit in St. Joseph County in late April 2006. Following roughly two weeks of arguments, Judge Michael Scopelitis ruled in favor of the State of Indiana, declaring the lawsuit brought by opponents a public lawsuit and therefore requiring the plaintiffs to post a bond of $1.9 billion (equivalent to $2.91 billion in 2025) for the case to proceed. The plaintiffs appealed Scopelitis's ruling to the Indiana Supreme Court, which, on June 20, 2006, in a 4–0 decision, upheld Scopelitis's earlier decision, allowing the lease of the Indiana Toll Road to proceed as scheduled.

The proceeds funded a portion of the extension of I-69 through Southwestern Indiana as well as a number of other highway projects throughout the state. The legislation also authorized the governor to establish a similar public–private partnership agreement for design, construction, and operation of the proposed Southern Indiana Toll Road, which would make up 117 miles (188 km) of the planned 142-mile (229 km) extension of I-69 from Indianapolis to Evansville. On November 9, 2006, Daniels announced the I-69 extension would not be tolled. In lieu of SITR, I-69 was built using $700 million (equivalent to $1.07 billion in 2025) of the Major Moves payout for the section from the I-64/I-164 interchange to Naval Surface Warfare Center Crane Division.

Some elected officials and candidates for office in the toll road counties expressed concerns that projects in and around Indianapolis would receive too large a share of the lease proceeds to the detriment of northern Indiana. B. Patrick Bauer, a Democratic state representative from South Bend and minority leader in the Indiana House of Representatives, issued a written statement the day before funding was distributed to the counties mocking Major Moves. "Now that the deal is done, the governor and officials in his administration have traveled the state to claim that the sale has financed every major road project scheduled over the next decade", Bauer said. "The fact is that most of these projects already were on course to be completed, without any assistance from the sale of the Toll Road."

On September 15, 2006, funds were distributed to the seven counties through which the Toll Road runs. The list below details each county's total share in the Major Moves money. Some of the funds from each county's distribution were directed to the cities and towns within that county.

- Elkhart County: $40 million (equivalent to $61.4 million in 2025)
- LaGrange County: $40 million (equivalent to $61.4 million in 2025)
- Lake County: $15 million (equivalent to $23 million in 2025)
- LaPorte County: $25 million (equivalent to $38.4 million in 2025) (Note: Total distribution amount would have been $40 million (equivalent to $61.4 million in 2025) if LaPorte County had joined the Northwest Indiana Regional Development Authority by September 15, 2006. Since it did not, the total distribution amount was $25 million (equivalent to $38.4 million in 2025).)
- Porter County: $40 million (equivalent to $61.4 million in 2025)
- Steuben County: $40 million (equivalent to $61.4 million in 2025)
- St. Joseph County: $40 million (equivalent to $61.4 million in 2025)

In December 2006, the ITRCC announced that a South Bend student, Andrea Hebster, would "receive $5,000 (Note: Equivalent to $7,671 in 2025.) toward her educational expenses for being selected as the grand prize winner of the Indiana Toll Road logo design contest". The new ITRCC logo roll out occurred in early 2007.

=== IFM Partners ===
The Cintra-Macquarie consortium filed for bankruptcy in September 2014, citing lower than projected traffic volumes and revenues. Then-Democratic US Senator Joe Donnelly urged Republican Governor Mike Pence to return the road to public control. However, Pence instead ordered a tender process to replace the operator and ultimately approved the purchase of the road by IFM Partners, an Australia-based firm.

== Tolls ==
Between the Westpoint barrier toll, near the Illinois state line, and the Portage barrier at milepost 24, flat-rate tolls are collected at exit and entrance ramps.

Between the Portage barrier, east to the Eastpoint barrier toll, near the Ohio state line, the Toll Road uses a ticket system, where one receives a ticket upon entering and pays a pre-calculated amount based on distance traveled when exiting. As of July 2026, standard passenger cars are charged a toll of $12.01 with E-ZPass and $12.00 with cash to travel along the section from Portage to Eastpoint, with an extra toll of $4.91 with E-ZPass and $4.90 with cash at the Westpoint barrier.

Originally, the ticket system covered the full length of the Toll Road, with Westpoint at current exit 5, roughly under the East 141st Street overpass. A computer system switchover, scheduled for June 11, 1984, but not performed until July 14, 1986, replaced punch card tickets with magnetically encoded ones for the section from mile 24 eastward and instituted cash collection for the remainder of the highway. Effective June 25, 2007, the Toll Road began electronic toll collection with the i-Zoom system. i-Zoom was fully compatible with the E-ZPass and I-Pass electronic toll collection systems. Indiana became the 12th state to use the E-ZPass system.

The i-Zoom brand name was retired starting in September 2012 to take advantage of the already-existing E-ZPass brand and to avert confusion with the upcoming Ohio River Bridges Project in the Louisville metropolitan area, which is managed by the Louisville–Southern Indiana Bridge Authority and uses the E-ZPass system.

== Service areas ==
Like all other toll highways built in the 1950s, the Toll Road has had service areas (called travel plazas) since its opening. Originally, there were eight pairs of travel plazas located approximately every 18 miles (29 km). Of these, five featured sit-down restaurants operated by Hosts International while the other three had only snack bars. Each travel plaza was named after a prominent Indiana native or resident. Gasoline and other auto services were available at all travel plazas. Originally, various oil companies included Standard, Sinclair, Pure, Gulf, Texaco, Citgo, ARCO, and Union 76 operating over the years at each of the travel plazas. Later, Standard Oil, later Amoco and now BP, assumed operations at all travel plazas. Later, BP at the travel plazas was replaced by Mobil, then Phillips 66, and currently Sunoco.

The westernmost snack bar at milepost 37.5 remained open until the mid-70s and is now used as a "Truck Only Parking" rest area with no facilities. The other two at mileposts 72.9 and 108 were closed in 1972, although the one at 108 was also converted into a truck parking area without facilities. All were demolished except for one, the former Benjamin Harrison snack bar on the eastbound side at milepost 72.9. It presently serves as a state police station and has no public facilities. The restaurant interiors were remodeled into short-order cafeterias in the late 1970s when Gladieux Food Services took over operations and were remodeled again for fast food service 1984–1985.

In June 2015, Ken Daley, the new CEO of the ITRCC, announced that all of the original travel plazas built in 1955 would be demolished and replaced within the next five years.

As of October 2015, the Booth Tarkington service area, the easternmost in Indiana, was permanently closed.

In July 2017, the Gene S. Porter (eastbound) and Ernie Pyle (westbound) service plazas opened in Howe. Both have Sunoco gas stations.

As of July 2020, the toll road has four pairs of service areas, with each pair having one service area for each direction of travel. They comprise the J.T. McCutcheon (westbound) and George Ade (eastbound) service areas at mile 22, the Wilbur Shaw (westbound) and Knute Rockne (eastbound) service areas at mile 56, the Henry Schricker (westbound) and George N. Craig (eastbound) service areas at mile 90, and the Ernie Pyle (westbound) and Gene Stratton Porter (eastbound) service areas at mile 126. They offer popular restaurant choices, convenience stores, snack kiosks, and gift shops. All travel plazas have modern restrooms, telephones, ATMs, vending, lottery machines, and electric vehicle charging stations.

== Future ==
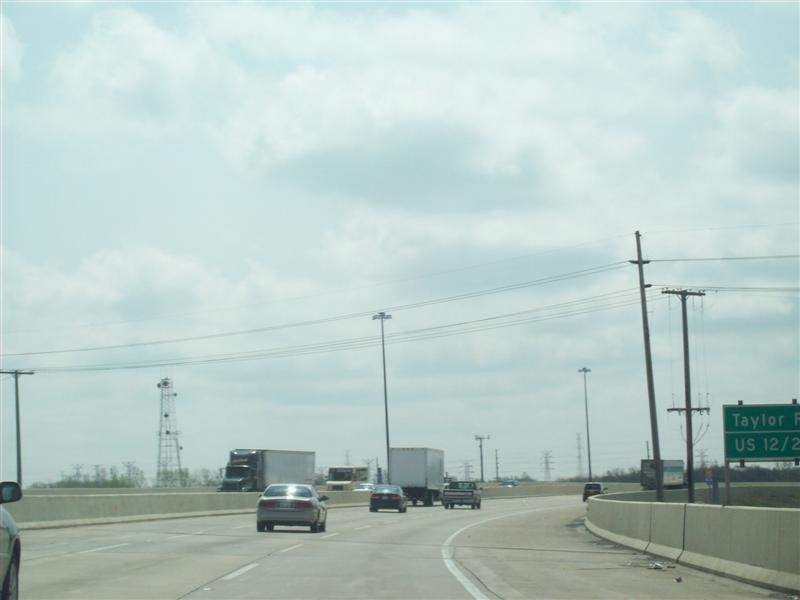
Recently finished six-lane section at US 12/US 20 in Gary in 2008

Part of the agreement to privatize operations of the Toll Road is to invest $600 million in the facility during the first nine years of the lease. This is above and beyond the $3.8 billion being invested by the State of Indiana in Major Moves projects. More than $300 million has already been invested in improving the Toll Road. Some examples include the third-lane expansion project at $250 million, electronic toll collection (i-Zoom) at $40 million, and toll plaza expansions (mileposts 1, 23, and 156) at $9 million total.

Included in the plans is adding a third lane in each direction in the most congested area of the Toll Road: from milepost 10–15.5. The third-lane expansion was completed in December 2011. The 10-year Bridge Capital Improvement plan is also underway, which will repair and rehabilitate nearly every structure on the ITR over the next 10 years. The lease agreement also requires ITRCC to maintain or improve the condition of the Toll Road to standards set forth by state and federal law.

== Exit list ==
County	Location	mi	km	Old exit	New exit	Destinations	Notes
Lake	Hammond	0.00	0.00			I-90 Toll west / Chicago Skyway west – Chicago	Continuation into Illinois
Lake	Hammond	0.08	0.13	0	0	US 12 / US 20 / US 41 / LMCT (Indianapolis Boulevard) – Chicago	Westbound exit and eastbound entrance
Lake	Hammond	1.06	1.71	Westpoint Toll Barrier			
Lake	Hammond	2.97	4.78		3	SR 912 east (Cline Avenue)	Eastbound exit and westbound entrance; opened October 27, 1986, with completion of SR 912
Lake	Hammond	4.18	6.73	1	5	US 41 (Calumet Avenue) – Hammond	Tolled westbound exit and eastbound entrance
Lake	Gary	9.52	15.32		10	To US 12 / SR 912 / LMCT (Cline Avenue) – Gary	Access via Gary Road; opened October 1, 1985; tolled eastbound entrance and westbound exit; serves Gary/Chicago International Airport
Lake	Gary	13.69	22.03	2	14A	Grant Street	Formerly Buchanan St; previously exit 13 rest
Lake	Gary	14.54	23.40		14B	SR 53 (Broadway) – Gary Works	Opened 1985; previously Exit 15; first single-point urban interchange built in Indiana
Lake	Gary	16.90	27.20	3	17	I-65 south – Indianapolis; US 12 / US 20 / LMCT (Dunes Highway)	Exit 262 on I-65; tolled westbound entrance and eastbound exit
Lake	Lake Station	20.68	33.28	4	21	I-80 west / I-94 / US 6 / SR 51 – Detroit, Chicago, Des Moines, Lake Station	Western end of I-80 concurrency; opened 1964; tolled westbound entrance and eastbound exit exit 15B on I-80/I-94
Porter	Portage	23.46	37.76		23	Willowcreek Road – Portage	Opened October 1, 1985; tolled westbound entrance and eastbound exit
Porter	Portage	23.95	38.54	Portage Toll Barrier (western end of ticket system)			
Porter	Chesterton	30.66	49.34	5	31	SR 49 – Chesterton, Valparaiso	Serves Indiana Dunes National Park and Indiana Dunes State Park
LaPorte	New Durham Township	38.91	62.62	6	39	US 421 – Michigan City, Westville	
LaPorte	Center Township	48.80	78.54	7	49	SR 39 – La Porte	
St. Joseph	South Bend	72.29	116.34		72	US 31 – South Bend, Plymouth, Niles	Opened October 27, 1980; connection to Nimtz Parkway opened September 3, 1993
St. Joseph	South Bend	76.46	123.05	8	77	SR 933 – South Bend	Serves University of Notre Dame
St. Joseph	Harris Township	82.64	133.00		83	SR 331 (Capital Avenue) to SR 23 – Mishawaka, Granger	Opened November 17, 1982
Elkhart	Elkhart	91.55	147.34	9	92	SR 19 – Elkhart	
Elkhart	Elkhart	95.98	154.46		96	CR 17 to M-217 / US 20 – Elkhart	Interchange opened October 9, 1997
Elkhart	Bristol	101.12	162.74		101	SR 15 – Bristol, Goshen	Opened August 15, 1983
Elkhart	York Township	107.21	172.54	10	107	US 131 north – Constantine SR 13 south – Middlebury	Southern terminus of US 131; signed northern terminus of SR 13
LaGrange	Howe	120.23	193.49	11	121	SR 9 – Howe, LaGrange, Sturgis	
Steuben	Fremont	143.53	230.99	12	144	I-69 / SR 120 / SR 127 south – Angola, Fort Wayne, Lansing	Exit 356 on I-69; serves Pokagon State Park
Steuben	York Township	152.50	245.42	Eastpoint Toll Barrier (eastern end of ticket system)			
Steuben	York Township	156.28	251.51			I-80 Toll east / I-90 Toll east / Ohio Turnpike east – Toledo	Continuation into Ohio
1.000 mi = 1.609 km; 1.000 km = 0.621 mi: Concurrency terminus; Incomplete access; Tolled

== See also ==
- Illinois State Toll Highway Authority
- New York Thruway
- Pennsylvania Turnpike

== Notes ==
Interstate 90
Previous state: Illinois	Indiana	Next state: Ohio
