= List of U.S. Highways in Indiana =

- Standard US Highway shields

System information
- Notes: Indiana Routes are generally state-maintained.

Highway names
- Interstates: Interstate X (I-X)
- US Highways: U.S. Route X (US X)
- State: State Road X (SR X)

System links
- Indiana State Highway System; Interstate; US; State; Scenic

The U.S. Highways in Indiana are those sections of United States Numbered Highways owned and maintained by the Indiana Department of Transportation (INDOT).

== List ==
| Number | Length (mi) | Length (km) | Southern or western terminus | Northern or eastern terminus | Formed | Removed | Notes |
|---|---|---|---|---|---|---|---|
| US 6 | 149.490 | 240.581 | I-80/I-94/US 6 at Hammond | US 6 near Butler | 1931 | current | Grand Army of the Republic Highway |
| US 12 | 46.258 | 74.445 | US 12/US 20/US 41 at Whiting | US 12 at Michiana Shores | 1926 | current | Iron Brigade Highway |
| US 20 | 155.734 | 250.630 | US 12/US 20/US 41 at Whiting | US 20 near Angola | 1926 | current | |
| US 24 | 166.846 | 268.513 | US 24/US 52 near Kentland | US 24 near Fort Wayne | 1926 | current | |
| US 27 | 117.765 | 189.524 | US 27 near Liberty | I-69/US 24/US 30 at SR 3 in Fort Wayne | 1926 | current | Previously extended northward into Michigan |
| US 30 | 156.217 | 251.407 | US 30 at Dyer | US 30 near Fort Wayne | 1926 | current | Lincoln Highway |
| US 31 | 266.02 | 428.12 | US 31 at Clarksville | US 31 near South Bend | 1926 | current | |
| US 31E | — | — | US 31E at Clarksville | US 31 in Sellersburg | 1937 | 1980 | Replaced by US 31 from Sellersburg to the Kentucky state line |
| US 31W | — | — | US 31W/US 150 at New Albany | US 31 in Sellersburg | 1937 | 1980 | Replaced by SR 311 |
| US 33 | 106.217 | 170.940 | US 33 near Decatur | US 20 in Elkhart | 1937 | current | Previously extended into Michigan |
| US 35 | 206.716 | 332.677 | I-70/US 35 near Richmond | US 20 in Michigan City | 1934 | current | |
| US 36 | 138.99 | 223.68 | US 36 near Dana | US 36 near Lynn | 1926 | current | |
| US 40 | 159.321 | 256.402 | US 40 near Liggett | US 40 near Richmond | 1926 | current | National Road |
| US 41 | 279.817 | 450.322 | US 41 at Evansville | US 12/US 20/US 41 at Whiting | 1926 | current | |
| US 50 | 171.38 | 275.81 | US 50 at Vincennes | US 50 near Lawrenceburg | 1926 | current | |
| US 52 | 202 | 325 | US 24/US 52 near Kentland | I-74/US 52 at Ohio state line | 1926 | current | |
| US 131 | 0.643 | 1.035 | I-80/I-90 (Indiana Toll Road) near Middlebury | US 131 near Middlebury | 1961 | current | |
| US 136 | 74.930 | 120.588 | US 136 near Foster | I-74/I-465 in Speedway | 1952 | current | |
| US 150 | 177.17 | 285.13 | US 150 near West Terre Haute | I-64/US 150 at New Albany | 1926 | current | |
| US 152 | 168 | 270 | US 36/US 40/US 52 in Indianapolis | US 41 in St. John | 1934 | 1938 | Replaced by US 231 |
| US 224 | 39.377 | 63.371 | US 24 in Huntington | US 224 near Decatur | 1934 | current | |
| US 231 | 284.277 | 457.499 | US 231 at Rockport | US 41 in St. John | 1954 | current | |
| US 421 | 255.065 | 410.487 | US 421 near Madison | US 20 in Michigan City | 1951 | current | |
| US 460 | — | — | Illinois state line | US 31E/US 460 at Clarksville | 1947 | 1977 | Largely replaced by I-64, SR 62, and SR 66 |
| US 641 | — | — | US 41/US 641 at the Kentucky state line | US 41/US 460/SR 62/SR 66 in Evansville | 1955 | 1971 | Replaced by US 41 |
Former

== Special routes ==
| Number | Length (mi) | Length (km) | Southern or western terminus | Northern or eastern terminus | Formed | Removed | Notes |
|---|---|---|---|---|---|---|---|
| US 6 Bus. | — | — | Illinois-Indiana state line | Lake Station | — | — | |
| US 6 Bus. | — | — | — | — | — | — | Served Bremen |
| US 12 Toll | — | — | Illinois-Indiana state line | Hammond | — | — | |
| US 20 Toll Bus. | — | — | Illinois-Indiana state line | Hammond | — | — | |
| US 20 Alt. | — | — | Tremont | Michigan City | — | — | |
| US 20 Bus. | — | — | South Bend | Mishawaka | — | — | |
| US 20 Byp. | — | — | South Bend | Elkhart | — | — | |
| US 20 Truck | — | — | Osceola | Elkhart | — | — | |
| US 24 Bus. | — | — | Logansport | Richvalley | — | — | |
| US 24 Bus. | — | — | — | — | — | — | Serves Peru |
| US 24 Bus. | — | — | — | — | — | — | Serves Wabash |
| US 24 Truck | — | — | — | — | — | — | Served Fort Wayne |
| US 27 Truck | — | — | — | — | — | — | Served Fort Wayne |
| US 31A | — | — | US 31/US 50 near Seymour | US 31 in Columbus | 1939 | 1981 | Replaced by SR 11 |
| US 31 Byp. | — | — | — | — | — | — | Served Kokomo |
| US 31 Bus. | — | — | — | — | — | — | Serves Peru |
| US 31 Alt. | — | — | — | — | — | — | Served Plymouth |
| US 31 Bus. | — | — | — | — | — | — | Serves Plymouth |
| US 31 Bus. | — | — | — | — | — | — | Serves South Bend |
| US 31 Byp. | — | — | — | — | — | — | Served South Bend |
| US 33 Bus. | — | — | — | — | — | — | Served Fort Wayne |
| US 33 Truck | — | — | — | — | — | — | Served Fort Wayne |
| US 41 Bus. | — | — | — | — | — | — | Served Terre Haute |
| US 41 Bus. | — | — | — | — | — | — | Serves Vincennes |
| US 41 Bus. | — | — | — | — | — | — | Serves Princeton |
| US 41 Bus. | — | — | — | — | — | — | Serves Evansville |
| US 50 Bus. | — | — | — | — | — | — | Served Vincennes |
| US 50 Bus. | — | — | — | — | — | — | Served Washington |
| US 50 Bus. | — | — | — | — | — | — | Serves Bedford |
| US 52 Bus. | — | — | — | — | — | — | Serves Fowler |
| US 52 Bus. | — | — | — | — | — | — | Served Lafayette |
| US 112S | — | — | Rolling Prairie | Michigan state line | 1933 | 1934 | |
| US 231 Byp. | — | — | — | — | — | — | Served Lafayette |
Former
