= Interstate 80 in Indiana =

Interstate 80 (I-80) is a transcontinental Interstate Highway in the United States, stretching from San Francisco, California, to Teaneck, New Jersey. In Indiana, it consists entirely of the following two highways:

- The Borman Expressway, from the Illinois state line to Lake Station, Indiana, running concurrently with I-94, U.S. Highway 6 (US 6), and a small portion of US 41.
- The Indiana Toll Road, from Lake Station to the Ohio state line, running concurrently with I-90. It comprises over 85% of the whole route.

Interstate 80
Previous state: Illinois	Indiana	Next state: Ohio

Browse numbered routes
← SR 75	I-80	→ I-90
