= Indiana Department of Transportation =

State government agency in Indiana

Indiana Department of Transportation (INDOT)

Agency overview
- Jurisdiction: Indiana
- Headquarters: 100 N. Senate Avenue, Indianapolis, Indiana
- Agency executive: Lyndsay Quist, Commissioner
- Parent agency: State of Indiana
- Website: in.gov/indot

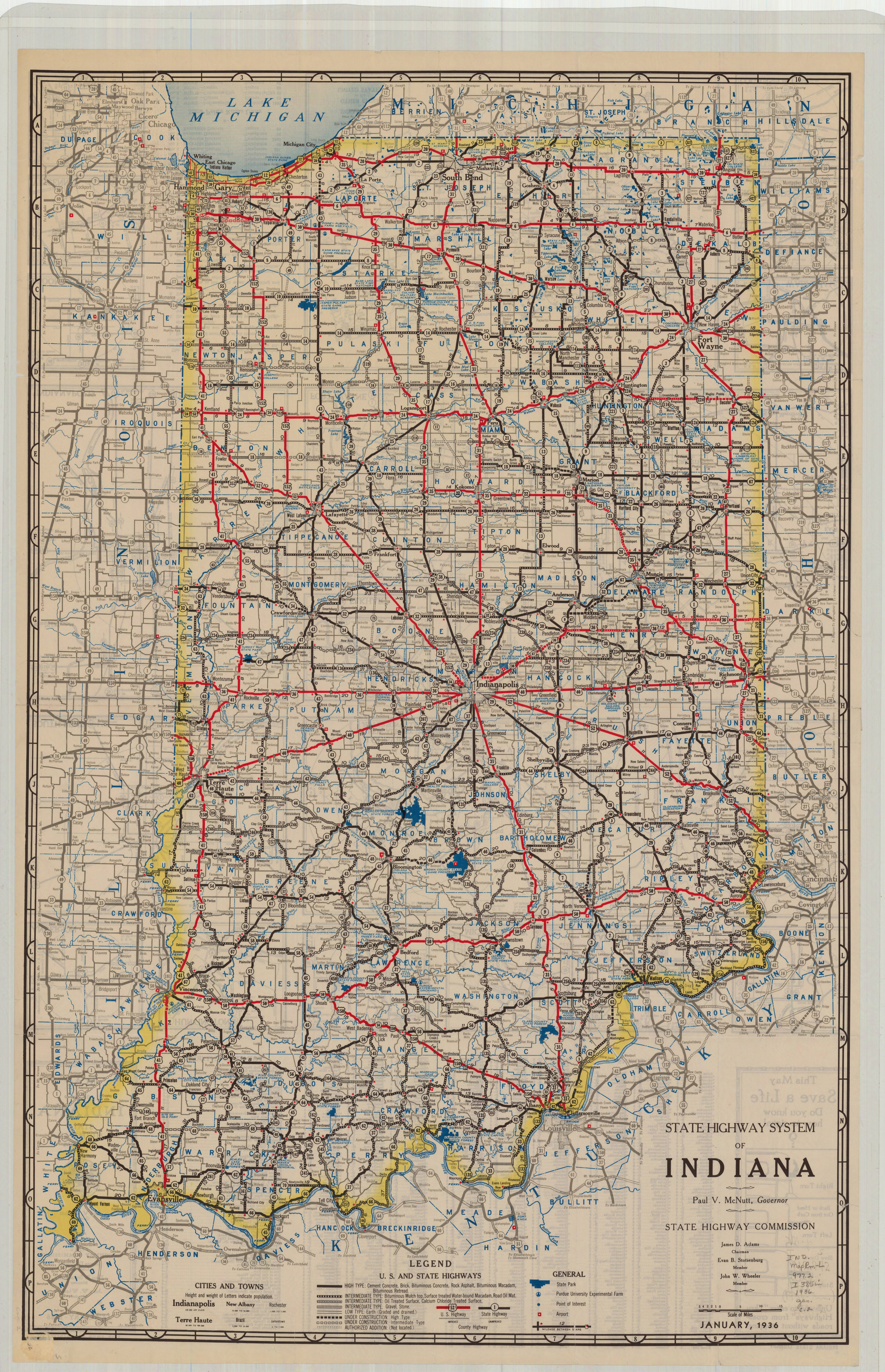
State highway system of Indiana, 1936, Indiana State Highway Commission

The Indiana Department of Transportation (INDOT) is a governmental agency of the U.S. state of Indiana charged with maintaining and regulating transportation and transportation related infrastructure such as state owned airports, state highways and state owned canals or railroads.

Indiana's "highway network" started out as a series of dirt paths, which settlers created for local travel. Most of the time, these paths did not interconnect, making travel difficult at best.

== Highway Act – 1917 ==
The first Indiana legislative step toward establishing a state highway commission that would meet the requirements for federal road grants was taken on March 7, 1917. But, aside from blazing a new trail, the newly organized State Highway Commission accomplished little of practical nature, because the constitutionality of the act creating the commission was challenged in the courts.

== Highway Act – 1919 ==
By the time that the 1917 Highway Act was ruled constitutional by the Indiana Supreme Court, (January 10, 1919) and a rehearing denied, (April 22, 1919) the State Legislature had repealed the original 1917 Act and replaced it with another which became law on March 10, 1919.

The 1919 Act directed that all equipment and property belonging to the 1917 Highway Commission was to be transferred to a new State Highway Commission. Thus, for all practical purposes, the effective and continuous operation of the present 'State Highway System began with the State Highway Commission which was created by the 1919 Act. However, as of September 30, 1917, a total of 898.6 miles of "main market highways" had been designated as "state highways" by the 1917 Commission. As prescribed by the law these were to be main roads, generally connected but with no detached roads.

The reconstituted State Highway Commission, as created by the 1919 Act, consisted of four members, operating as a bi‑partisan, part‑time body and employing a full‑time "Director" to carry out policies formulated by the commission. The 1919 Act also established the principal divisions of Construction, Maintenance, and Auditing, and set professional qualifications for each of these division heads.

This organizational pattern of the State Highway Commission continued without Substantial change until the 1933 State Legislature changed the commission to a three‑member, full‑time body; one member Of the Commission serving as chairman and administrative head of operations. Then, again in 1941, the commission was made a four‑member, bi‑partisan body, serving on a full‑time basis; with one member designated as chairman and administrative head of operations. (This is the organizational pattern of the Commission which is still in effect, as of June 30, 1948.)

The 1919 Act gave broad powers to the State Highway Commission, including authority to make such rules and regulations "as may be necessary in their judgment to carry out the provisions of this act or to preserve the highways while under construction and protect from harm the passengers traveling thereon, not inconsistent with this act and the laws of the state."

One of the important provisions of the 1919 Act was that the State Highway Commission "shall at the earliest possible moment proceed to lay out a system of state highways which shall reach each and every county seat of the state and each and every city or town of over 5,000 inhabitants; ‑‑‑‑‑‑‑." County seats and cities of over 5,000 inhabitants also were to be connected with the "improved trunk highways" of adjoining states, so that the highways of other states and the connecting highways of Indiana would become linked as "continuous improved highways". All Indiana roads previously designated, as "main market highways" under the 1917 Act became "state highways" under the 1919 Act.

After highways of the new State Highway System were approved by the State Highway Commission and the Governor, they were to be known as "state highways" and were to be "constructed, reconstructed, repaired, and maintained by the State Highway Commission out of the state highway funds." The commission was required to take over a sufficient mileage of roads by April 1, 1920, to reach every county seat.

In its annual report for the fiscal year ending September 30, 1920, the selection of the State Highway System had been sufficiently completed and approved by the Governor to comply with the section of the law requiring a state‑road connection with every county seat. The total mileage of the road system approved was approximately 3,191 miles, not including the roads inside the incorporated towns. At this stage the State Highway System comprised about 5 per cent of the entire road mileage of the state.

The following table shows the types of surface of the 1920 State Highway System and the approximate mileage of various types:

Hard surfaced pavement 138

Waterbound, and Bituminous Macadam 897

Gravel 1,892

Earth (including new location) 264

Total (outside of incorporated towns) 3,191

== Steady annual growth of state highway mileage ==
Beginning with this mileage, in 1920, the State Highway System has been improved and increased in mileage as indicated by the graph showing miles maintained from 1920 to 1948. As more money became available, more roads were paved; and additional road mileage was taken over for maintenance. This relieved the county and township authorities of the expense of maintaining many of the roads carrying the rapidly developing traffic of motor vehicles.

The 1933 Act provided that all highways designated as State Highways under the JL919 Act were to retain their status under new act. The 1933 Act, with an amendment of some sections in 1935, also gave authority to the new State Highway Commission to select and designate additional highways. The 1935 amendment included the provision that, as a condition to the taking of any highway into the State Highway‑System, the State Highway Commission may require the board of county commissioners of the county or counties in which such highway is situated to pay the cost of the right of way therefor or such portion thereof as the State Highway Commission shall deem equitable. It is still the policy of the State Highway Commission to require counties to furnish the necessary right of way before a new highway is taken into the State Highway System.

Under an act of the 1937 State Legislature, the State Highway Commission was authorized, as funds were available for the purpose, to increase the mileage of the State Highway System‑‑but not beyond a maximum of 12,000 miles before July 1, 1939.

However, this same act provided that a county highway should not be added to the State Highway System unless it carried an average daily traffic of at least 200 vehicles or was a desirable connecting link between state highways. This 1937 Act also provided that the Highway Commission should add to the State Highway System any county highway having an average daily traffic of 400 or more vehicles if such highway was, in the opinion of the commission, a desirable addition to the State Highway System.

When automobiles came on the scene in the late 19th century and early 20th century, people wanted better roads to travel. This interest was a national one, sparking the U.S. Congress to offer money to any state that would improve its roads. Indiana took Congress up on its offer and created the Indiana State Highway Commission (ISHC) in 1919. This commission's task was to create a highway network that would connect every county seat and every town with a population more than 5,000.

The Federal Aid Highway Act of 1956 established what is known today as the Interstate Highway System and signaled the beginning of the largest public works project in U.S. history. The act also established the Federal Highway Trust Fund, marking the first time that tax income from motor vehicles and highway expenditures were linked at the national level. The intent of the legislation was to make the highway program self-financing through the imposition of user fees.

A national highway safety program was initiated with the Federal-Aid Highway Act of 1966. The program established safety standards for motor vehicles and authorized matching grants to carry out safety activities.

The State Highway Commission served Hoosiers well until 1981 when it became the Indiana Department of Highways (IDOH). The Indiana Department of Highways also included the Office of Traffic Safety, the Toll Road Commission, and the Toll Bridge Commission.

On July 1, 1989, the Department of Highways underwent another change, combining the Department of Highways and the Transportation Planning Office to become the agency as we know it today—the Indiana Department of Transportation (INDOT).

In 1997, Governor Frank O'Bannon and the Indiana General Assembly started the Crossroads 2000 Program. This program invested $813 million in new highway construction projects across Indiana.

In late 2005, Governor Mitch Daniels launched an aggressive 10-year, $10 billion transportation plan, known as "Major Moves," to significantly improve and expand Indiana's highway infrastructure. A total of $2.6 billion was committed to Major Moves from the long-term lease of the Indiana Toll Road.

In addition to the Major Moves plan fund, INDOT benefited from the American Recovery and Reinvestment Act of 2009 (ARRA). Approximately $71 million of ARRA funds have been applied to Major Moves new construction, allowing for accelerated and adjusted Major Moves projects. Finally, no additional debt or increase in taxes has been incurred to complete Major Moves projects.

Sources: State Archives, INDOT Transportation Planning Office, Indiana State Library and State Board of Accounts

== Districts ==
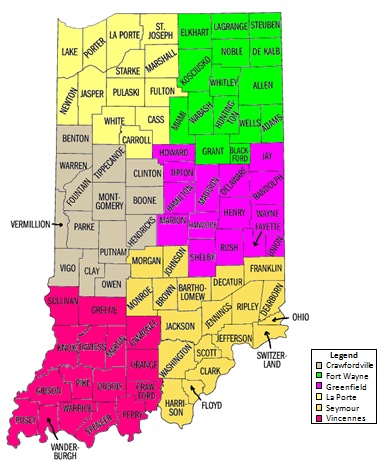
INDOT districts map

INDOT is divided into six districts for administrative purposes:

District	Sub-Districts	Counties
Crawfordsville	Cloverdale, Crawfordsville, Fowler, Frankfort, Terre Haute	Benton, Boone, Clay, Clinton, Fountain, Hendricks, Montgomery, Owen, Parke, Putnam, Tippecanoe, Vermillion, Vigo and Warren and also parts of Carroll, Hamilton, Jasper, Marion, Marion, Morgan, Newton, Sullivan, White, and Greene.
Fort Wayne	Angola, Bluffton, Elkhart, Fort Wayne, Wabash	Adams, Allen, DeKalb, Elkhart, Fulton, Grant, Huntington, Kosciusko, Lake, LaGrange, Miami, Noble, Steuben, Wabash, Wells, Whitley and parts of Blackford, Fulton, Jay and St. Joseph.
Greenfield	Albany, Cambridge, Greenfield, Indianapolis, Tipton	Blackford, Delaware, Fayette, Hamilton, Hancock, Henry, Howard, Jay, Madison, Marion, Randolph, Rush, Shelby, Tipton, Union, Wayne and also parts of Boone, Franklin, Grant, Hendricks, Miami, and Morgan.
LaPorte	Gary, LaPorte, Monticello, Plymouth, Rensselaer, Winamac	Carroll, Cass, Fulton, Jasper, Lagrange, LaPorte, Marshall, Newton, Porter, Pulaski, St. Joseph, Starke, White and also parts of Clinton, Kosciusko, and Miami.
Seymour	Aurora, Bloomington, Columbus, Falls City (Clarksville), Madison	Bartholomew, Brown, Clark, Dearborn, Decatur, Floyd, Franklin, Harrison, Jackson, Jefferson, Jennings, Johnson, Monroe, Morgan, Ohio, Ripley, Scott, Switzerland, Washington and also parts of Crawford, Greene, Lawrence, Owen, and Shelby.
Vincennes	Evansville, Linton, Paoli, Tell City, Vincennes	Crawford, Daviess, Dubois, Gibson, Greene, Knox, Lawrence, Martin, Orange, Perry, Pike, Posey, Spencer, Sullivan, Vanderburgh, Warrick and also parts of Clay, Harrison, Vigo, Washington and Owen.

== Lists of roads ==
Interstate Highways: A list of Interstate Highways within Indiana.
U.S. Routes: A list of U.S. Routes within Indiana.
State Roads: A list of all state roads within Indiana.
Former state highways: A list of former state roads within Indiana.

== See also ==
- Alvan V. Burch, chairman of the first Indiana State Highway Commission
