= Algiers, Winslow and Western Railway =

Railway company in Indiana, US

Coordinates: 38°26′17.0″N 87°12′51.3″W

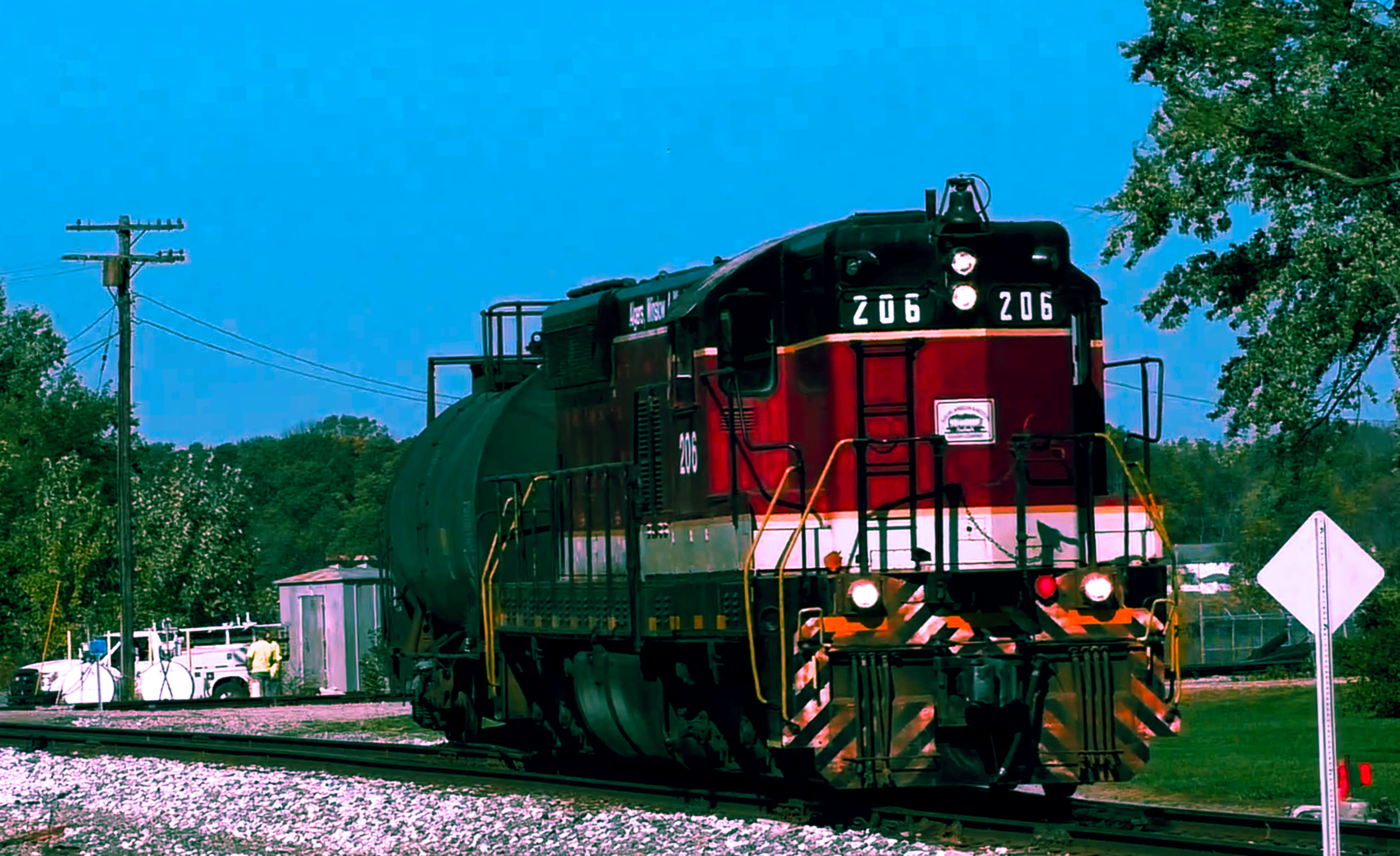
- AWW Engine no. 206, an EMD SD9 locomotive in Cottage Grove, Indiana.

Overview
- Headquarters: Oakland City, Indiana
- Reporting mark: AWW
- Locale: Southern Indiana
- Dates of operation: 1926–2007
- Successor: Norfolk Southern

Technical
- Track gauge: 4 ft 8 1/2 in (1,435 mm)
- Length: 19 miles (31 km)

The Algiers, Winslow and Western Railway (reporting mark AWW) was a Class III short-line railroad that served the surface mining operations in Pike County, Indiana. It operated approximately 19 miles of track which reached from the coal mines west of Cato south to those at Enos Corner, and ran close to the Norfolk Southern Railway and Indiana Southern Railroad. It was acquired in March 2007 by Norfolk Southern, but still operating under the original company's name.

The railroad's name comes from the Pike County towns of Algiers (now virtually extinct) and Winslow.

== History ==
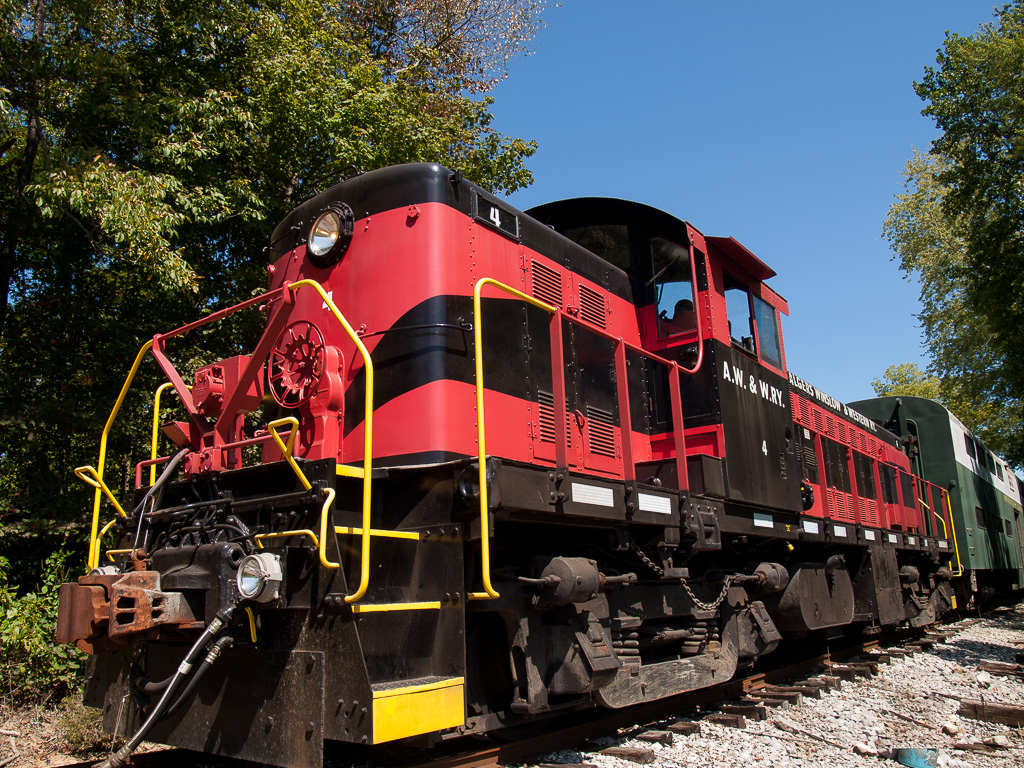
Former AWW #4 in service on the Indiana Railway Museum.

Southern Railway, the predecessor of Norfolk Southern, sought to purchase AWW in 1974, but the move was denied by the Interstate Commerce Commission which limited Southern to acquiring only 50% of the railroad. Ownership of the remaining 50% passed among various coal interests over the next 30 years, finally falling to Horizon Natural Resources.

In October 2004, Horizon went through bankruptcy and sold its interest in the railroad (along with two mines along the AWW) to Lexington Coal Company; Lexington sold it to Indiana Land and Mineral Company in September 2005, who in turn transferred it to American Metals and Coal International (AMCI) in January 2006. Norfolk Southern won approval from the Surface Transportation Board to acquire AMCI's share in AWW in March 2007, completing its takeover of the railroad.

Since late 2004, the AWW has carried no coal and only a little other traffic, mainly from a nearby industrial tie plant. Railroad workers have been laid off and are called in only as needed, but plans to reopen two of the local mines may increase traffic on the line.

== Roster ==
| Unit | Builder | Model | Serial no. | Disposition | Notes |
|---|---|---|---|---|---|
| 1 | ALCO | S-4 | 79818 | Donated to Indiana Railway Museum | |
| 2 | ALCO | S-4 | 79819 | - | |
| 3 | ALCO | RS-1 | 73760 | Donated to Lake Superior Railroad Museum | |
| 4 | ALCO | RS-1 | 75217 | Donated to Indiana Railway Museum | |
| 5 | ALCO | RS-1 | 75218 | - | |
| 6 | ALCO | Slug | 79564 | - | |
| 57 | - | 0-6-0 | - | Scrapped | |
| 203 | EMD | SD9 | 20446 | Scrapped in March 2020 | |
| 204 | EMD | SD9 | 20447 | Scrapped in March 2020 | |
| 205 | EMD | SD9 | 20448 | Sold to Indiana Eastern Railroad; donated to the Tennessee Valley Railroad Museum | |
| 206 | EMD | SD9 | 20449 | Sold to Indiana Eastern Railroad | |
| 9552 | ALCO | 2-8-2 | 55653 | Scrapped | |
