= Indiana State Road 364 =

State highway in Indiana, United States

State Road 364
- SR 364 highlighted in red

Route information
- Maintained by INDOT
- Length: 4.175 mi (6.719 km)

Major junctions
- West end: SR 61 near Winslow
- East end: Pike State Forest

Location
- Country: United States
- State: Indiana
- Counties: Pike

Highway system
- Indiana State Highway System; Interstate; US; State; Scenic
← SR 362	→ US 421

State Road 364 in the U.S. state of Indiana is a short four-mile (6 km) route in Pike County.

== Route description ==
State Road 364 begins at State Road 61 south of Winslow. It runs directly east to the Ferdinand State Forest and Pike State Forest.

== Major intersections ==
The entire route is in Pike County.

Location	mi	km	Destinations	Notes
Patoka Township	0.000	0.000	SR 61 – Lynnville, Winslow	Western terminus of SR 364
Marion Township	4.175	6.719	CR 650 E	Eastern terminus of SR 364
1.000 mi = 1.609 km; 1.000 km = 0.621 mi
