= Indiana State Road 257 =

State highway in Indiana, United States

State Road 257
- SR 257 highlighted in red

Route information
- Maintained by INDOT
- Length: 31.352 mi (50.456 km)

Major junctions
- South end: Broadway Street in Stendal
- US 50 / US 150 in Washington
- North end: Old US 50 in Washington

Location
- Country: United States
- State: Indiana
- Counties: Daviess, Pike

Highway system
- Indiana State Highway System; Interstate; US; State; Scenic
← SR 256	→ SR 258

State Road 257 is a 31-mile route in Daviess and Pike counties in the U.S. state of Indiana.

== Route description ==
State Road 257 begins in the small town of Stendal. It winds north to pass through Pikeville, Velpen and Otwell. It terminates in Washington. From mile 6 in Otwell, Indiana, there is a five-mile straight stretch to mile 11 in the road. It moves on to Velpen, where it continues to make more curves through Pike County.

== Major intersections ==
County	Location	mi	km	Destinations	Notes
Pike	Stendal	0.000	0.000	Broadway Street; Washington Street	Southern terminus of SR 257
Pike	Lockhart Township	4.157	6.690	SR 64 – Oakland City, Huntingburg	
Pike	Jefferson Township	14.795	23.810	SR 56 – Petersburg, Jasper	
Pike	Jefferson Township	16.952	27.282	SR 356 west – Petersburg	
Daviess	Washington	30.026	48.322	US 50 / US 150 – Vincennes, Loogootee	
Daviess	Washington	31.352	50.456	Old US 50	Northern terminus of SR 257
1.000 mi = 1.609 km; 1.000 km = 0.621 mi
