= Saint Henry =

Saint Henry or St Henry may refer to:

- Henry II, Holy Roman Emperor
- Henry, Bishop of Uppsala, Catholic saint and martyr
- St. Henry of Cocket, hermit and miracle-worker of Coquet Island in north England, a Dane of birth (d. 1127)
- Saint Henry, Indiana, an unincorporated town
- St. Henry, Ohio, a village

== See also ==
- San Enrique (disambiguation)
- Saint John Henry Newman
