= Madison Township, Indiana =

Madison Township is the name of fourteen townships in Indiana:

- Madison Township, Allen County, Indiana
- Madison Township, Carroll County, Indiana
- Madison Township, Clinton County, Indiana
- Madison Township, Daviess County, Indiana
- Madison Township, Dubois County, Indiana
- Madison Township, Jay County, Indiana
- Madison Township, Jefferson County, Indiana
- Madison Township, Montgomery County, Indiana
- Madison Township, Morgan County, Indiana
- Madison Township, Pike County, Indiana
- Madison Township, Putnam County, Indiana
- Madison Township, St. Joseph County, Indiana
- Madison Township, Tipton County, Indiana
- Madison Township, Washington County, Indiana

== See also ==
- Madison Township (disambiguation)
