= South Knox Middle/High School =

Location
- Vincennes, Knox County, Indiana 47591; United States; 38.636226°N 87.421161°W

Information
- Type: Public high school
- Established: 1967
- School district: South Knox School Corporation
- Superintendent: Jeff Cochren
- Principal: David Couchenour
- Faculty: 35.00 (FTE)
- Grades: 7–12
- Enrollment: 580 (2023–2024)
- Student to teacher ratio: 16.57
- Color
- Team name: Spartans
- Rivals: Vincennes Lincoln, North Knox
- Website: sknox.k12.in.us/o/skmhs

South Knox Middle/High School (SKMHS) is a combination middle school and high school located in Harrison Township, Knox County, Indiana, United States, approximately 6.5 miles (10.5 km) southeast of Vincennes in an unincorporated community called Verne. The school is part of the South Knox School Corporation.

The school district has the following municipalities in its boundary: Decker, Monroe City, and Wheatland. The school district has a Vincennes postal address but does not include any part of the Vincennes city limits.

== About ==
South Knox Middle/High School was formed from the merger of local high schools in Monroe City, Fritchton, Wheatland, and Decker (which had earlier incorporated Decker Chapel High School). The school's district encompasses most of southern Knox County.

In 1985, the high school and middle school were organized as two separate schools.

== Athletics ==
The school's athletic nickname is the Spartans, and it participates in the Blue Chip Conference. Its colors are red, white, and blue. The school song is "Hail South Knox High."

The dedication of the gymnasium was held in November 1967, with IHSAA Commissioner Phil N. Eskew presiding. The Spartans won the first boys' basketball game played there, defeating North Posey. The first South Knox boys' basketball coach was Sam Alford, father of Steve Alford. In 1968, South Knox became a charter member of the Blue Chip Conference and has remained a member ever since. In 2013, the boys' cross country team was the first team in any sport to appear in the IHSAA State Championship.

In 2025, the girls' basketball team won the 2A IHSAA State Championship, defeating Rensselaer Central 55–33. This was the school's very first state championship in any sport.

== See also ==
- List of high schools in Indiana
