= Madison Township, Pennsylvania =

Madison Township is the name of some places in the U.S. state of Pennsylvania:

- Madison Township, Armstrong County, Pennsylvania
- Madison Township, Clarion County, Pennsylvania
- Madison Township, Columbia County, Pennsylvania
- Madison Township, Lackawanna County, Pennsylvania

== See also ==
- Madison, Pennsylvania, a borough in Westmoreland county
- Northeast Madison Township, Pennsylvania
- Southwest Madison Township, Pennsylvania
- Madison Township (disambiguation)
