= Glezen =

Glezen may refer to:

- Glezen, Indiana
- Glezen Glacier
