= Indiana State Road 241 =

State highway in Indiana, United States

State Road 241
- SR 241 highlighted in red

Route information
- Maintained by INDOT
- Length: 18.495 mi (29.765 km)

Major junctions
- South end: US 41 at Decker
- North end: US 50 / US 150 at Wheatland

Location
- Country: United States
- State: Indiana
- Counties: Knox

Highway system
- Indiana State Highway System; Interstate; US; State; Scenic
← SR 240	→ SR 243

State Road 241 in the U.S. state of Indiana is an 18-mile road that runs entirely within Knox County in the southwest corner of the state.

== Route description ==
State Road 241 begins at U.S. Route 41 near Decker. It runs north to the small town of Vollmer, then meanders to the northeast through Iona and Ridgeville until it reaches Monroe City, where it is concurrent with State Road 61 for about half a mile. It then continues northeast for another four miles to U.S. Route 50/150 just southeast of Wheatland.

== Major intersections ==
The entire route is in Knox County.

Location	mi	km	Destinations	Notes
Decker	0.000	0.000	US 41 – Evansville, Princeton, Vincennes	Southern terminus of SR 241
Monroe City	13.712	22.067	SR 61 north – Vincennes	Western end of SR 61 concurrency
Monroe City	14.162	22.792	SR 61 south – Petersburg	Eastern end of SR 61 concurrency
Wheatland	18.495	29.765	US 50 / US 150 – Vincennes, Washington	Northern terminus of SR 241
1.000 mi = 1.609 km; 1.000 km = 0.621 mi: Concurrency terminus
