= Cass Township, Dubois County, Indiana =

Cass Township
- Township
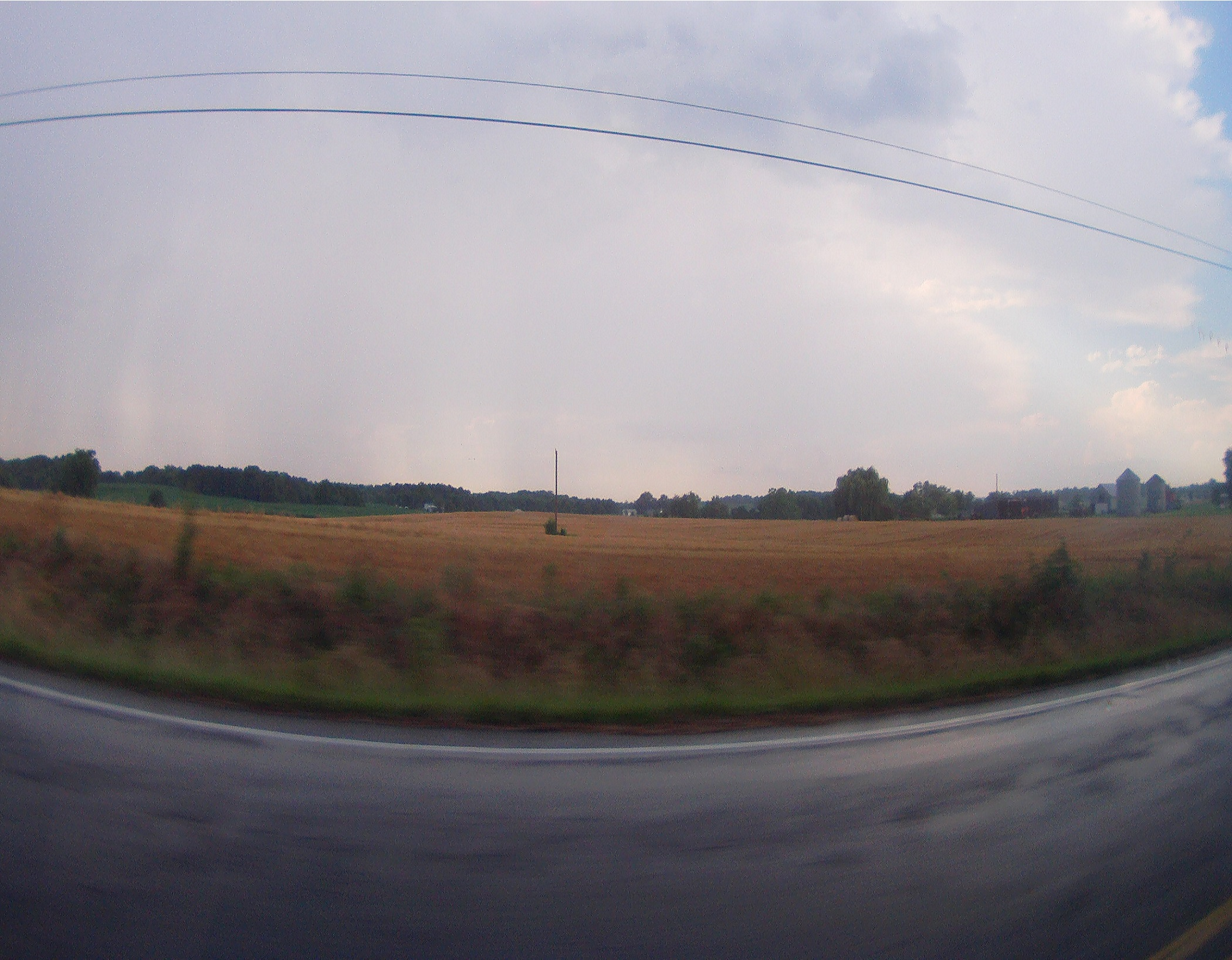
- Countryside from U.S. 231 in Cass Township

- Location of Cass Township in Dubois County
- Coordinates: 38°14′31″N 87°00′20″W
- Country: United States
- State: Indiana
- County: Dubois

Government
  - Type: Indiana township

Area
  - Total: 38.87 sq mi (100.7 km^{2})
  - Land: 38.54 sq mi (99.8 km^{2})
  - Water: 0.33 sq mi (0.85 km^{2})
- Elevation: 561 ft (171 m)

Population (2020)
  - Total: 2,106
  - Density: 54.9/sq mi (21.2/km^{2})
- FIPS code: 18-10684
- GNIS feature ID: 453163

Cass Township is one of twelve townships in Dubois County, Indiana. As of the 2010 census, its population was 2,115 and it contained 873 housing units.

== History ==
Cass Township was created from land given by Patoka Township.

== Geography ==
According to the 2010 census, the township has a total area of 38.87 square miles (100.7 km^{2}), of which 38.54 square miles (99.8 km^{2}) (or 99.15%) is land and 0.33 square miles (0.85 km^{2}) (or 0.85%) is water.

=== Cities and towns ===
- Holland

=== Unincorporated towns ===
- Johnsburg
- Saint Henry
- Zoar

(This list is based on USGS data and may include former settlements.)

=== Adjacent townships ===
- Patoka Township (north)
- Ferdinand Township (east)
- Carter Township, Spencer County (southeast)
- Pigeon Township, Warrick County (southwest)
- Lockhart Township, Pike County (west)

=== Major highways ===
- U.S. Route 231
- Indiana State Road 161

=== Cemeteries ===
The township contains eleven cemeteries: Augustana, Holland Methodist, Mount Vernon, Mount Zion, Saint Henry, Saint James (East and West), Saint Paul United Church of Christ, Stone Family Cemetery, Wibbeler Family Cemetery, Zoar Methodist (partially in Pike County).
