= Arthur, Indiana =

Unincorporated community in Indiana, United States

- Unincorporated community and Census designated place
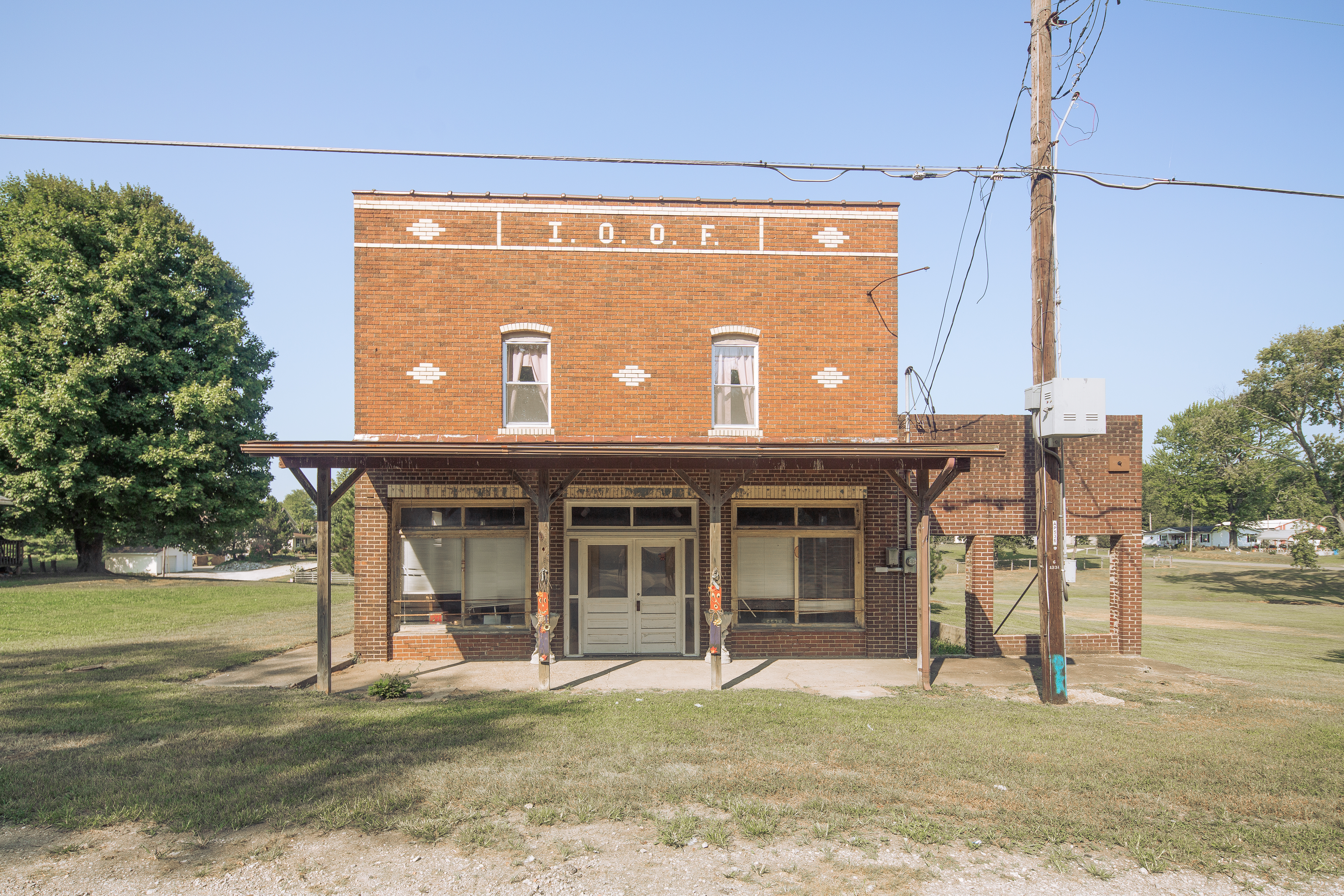

- Location within Indiana Location within the United States
- Coordinates: 38°20′29″N 87°15′00″W
- Country: United States
- State: Indiana
- County: Pike
- Township: Patoka
- Elevation: 495 ft (151 m)
- Time zone: UTC-5 (Eastern (EST))
  - Summer (DST): UTC-4 (EDT)
- ZIP code: 47598
- Area codes: 812, 930
- GNIS feature ID: 2830493

Arthur or Arthur Junction due to its location at the junction of Indiana 61 and Indiana 64, is a Census designated place in Patoka Township, Pike County, in the U.S. state of Indiana.

== History ==
A post office was established at Arthur in 1873, and remained in operation until 1903. The community was named for Arthur Thompson, an early settler.

== Demographics ==
The United States Census Bureau delineated Arthur as a census designated place in the 2022 American Community Survey.
