= Zoar, Indiana =

Unincorporated community in Indiana, United States

- Unincorporated community
- Location within Indiana Location within the United States
- Coordinates: 38°16′09″N 87°04′23″W
- Country: United States
- State: Indiana
- County: Dubois, Pike
- Township: Cass, Lockhart
- Elevation: 561 ft (171 m)
- Time zone: UTC-5 (Eastern (EST))
  - Summer (DST): UTC-4 (EDT)
- ZIP code: 47590
- Area codes: 812, 930
- GNIS feature ID: 446487

Zoar is an unincorporated community in Pike and Dubois counties, in the U.S. state of Indiana.

== History ==
A church at Zoar was built in 1871, and its schoolhouse was built in 1897. A post office was established at Zoar in 1900, and remained in operation until it was discontinued in 1907. The community was likely named after Zoar, Ohio.
