= Monroe Township, Pike County, Indiana =

Monroe Township Pike County
- Township
- Location in Pike County
- Coordinates: 38°17′15″N 87°15′27″W
- Country: United States
- State: Indiana
- County: Pike

Government
  - Type: Indiana township

Area
  - Total: 43.67 sq mi (113.1 km^{2})
  - Land: 42.46 sq mi (110.0 km^{2})
  - Water: 1.21 sq mi (3.1 km^{2}) 2.77%
- Elevation: 479 ft (146 m)

Population (2020)
  - Total: 623
  - Density: 14.7/sq mi (5.67/km^{2})
- ZIP codes: 47584, 47585, 47598, 47619, 47660
- GNIS feature ID: 453644
- Website: myspurgeon.com

Monroe Township is one of nine townships in Pike County, Indiana, United States. As of the 2020 census, its population was 623 and it contained 297 housing units.

Historical population
| Census | Pop. | Note | %± |
|---|---|---|---|
| 1890 | 2,240 | | — |
| 1900 | 2,264 | | 1.1% |
| 1910 | 2,037 | | −10.0% |
| 1920 | 1,616 | | −20.7% |
| 1930 | 1,737 | | 7.5% |
| 1940 | 1,521 | | −12.4% |
| 1950 | 1,218 | | −19.9% |
| 1960 | 927 | | −23.9% |
| 1970 | 842 | | −9.2% |
| 1980 | 839 | | −0.4% |
| 1990 | 733 | | −12.6% |
| 2000 | 715 | | −2.5% |
| 2010 | 673 | | −5.9% |
| 2020 | 623 | | −7.4% |
Source: US Decennial Census

== Geography ==
According to the 2010 census, the township has a total area of 43.67 square miles (113.1 km^{2}), of which 42.46 square miles (110.0 km^{2}) (or 97.23%) is land and 1.21 square miles (3.1 km^{2}) (or 2.77%) is water.

=== Cities, towns, villages ===
- Spurgeon

=== Unincorporated towns ===
- Coe at 38.306438°N 87.258064°W
- Enos Corner at 38.289216°N 87.26112°W
- Oakland City Junction at 38.331715°N 87.301400°W

(This list is based on USGS data and may include former settlements.)

=== Cemeteries ===
The township contains these five cemeteries: Coleman, Davis, Saint Pauls, Simpson and Union.

=== Major highways ===
- SR 61

=== Lakes ===
- Enos Lake
- Grey Lake

== School districts ==
- Pike County School Corporation

== Political districts ==
- State House District 63
- State Senate District 48
