= Verne, Indiana =

- Unincorporated community
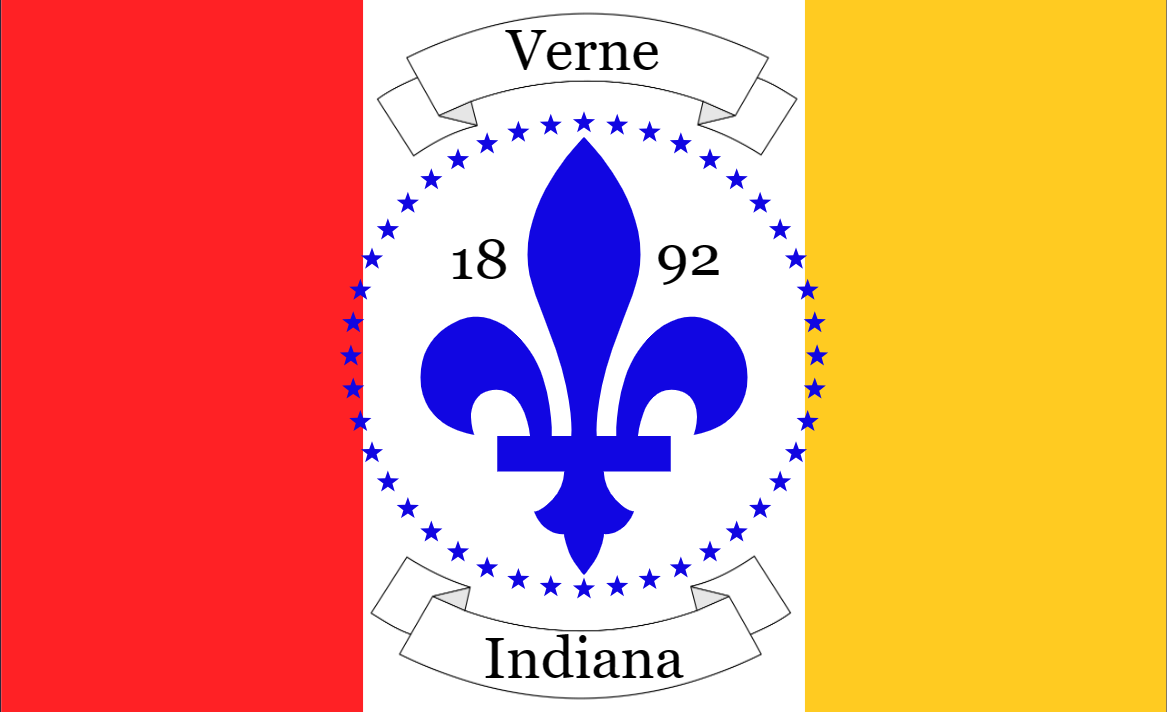
- Flag

- Location within Indiana Location within the United States
- Coordinates: 38°38′12″N 87°25′46″W
- Country: United States
- State: Indiana
- County: Knox
- Township: Harrison
- Elevation: 574 ft (175 m)
- ZIP code: 47591
- FIPS code: 18-78848
- GNIS feature ID: 445253

Verne is an unincorporated community in Harrison Township, Knox County, Indiana.

== History ==
A post office was established at Verne in 1892, and remained in operation until it was discontinued in 1907. The post office is now known as the Verne Store and has undergone changes, from a gas station to a flower boutique to now, as of January 2024, a small restaurant.

== Other Major Companies/Schooling ==
Verne has a one really major company called the Verne Store (see History). Verne also has a major school that is a part of the Vincennes Public Schools called South Knox High School and an Elementary School.
