= Marysville, Pike County, Indiana =

Unincorporated community in Indiana, United States

Marysville
- Unincorporated community
- Location within Indiana Location within the United States
- Coordinates: 38°21′07″N 87°16′42″W
- Country: United States
- State: Indiana
- County: Pike
- Township: Patoka
- Elevation: 492 ft (150 m)
- Time zone: UTC-5 (Eastern (EST))
  - Summer (DST): UTC-4 (EDT)
- ZIP code: 47598
- Area code: 812
- GNIS feature ID: 438690

Marysville is an unincorporated community in Patoka Township, Pike County, in the U.S. state of Indiana.
