= White Oak Springs, Indiana =

Unincorporated community in Indiana, United States

Whiteoak, Indiana
- Unincorporated community
- Location within Indiana Location within the United States
- Coordinates: 38°24′34.2″N 87°8′47.0″W
- Country: United States
- State: Indiana
- County: Pike
- Township: Marion
- Elevation: 495 ft (151 m)
- Time zone: UTC-5 (Eastern (EST))
  - Summer (DST): UTC-4 (EDT)
- ZIP code: 47598
- Area codes: 812, 930
- GNIS feature ID: 445976

White Oak Springs was a settlement in Marion Township, Pike County, in the U.S. state of Indiana.
