= Union, Indiana =

Unincorporated community in Indiana, United States

- Unincorporated community
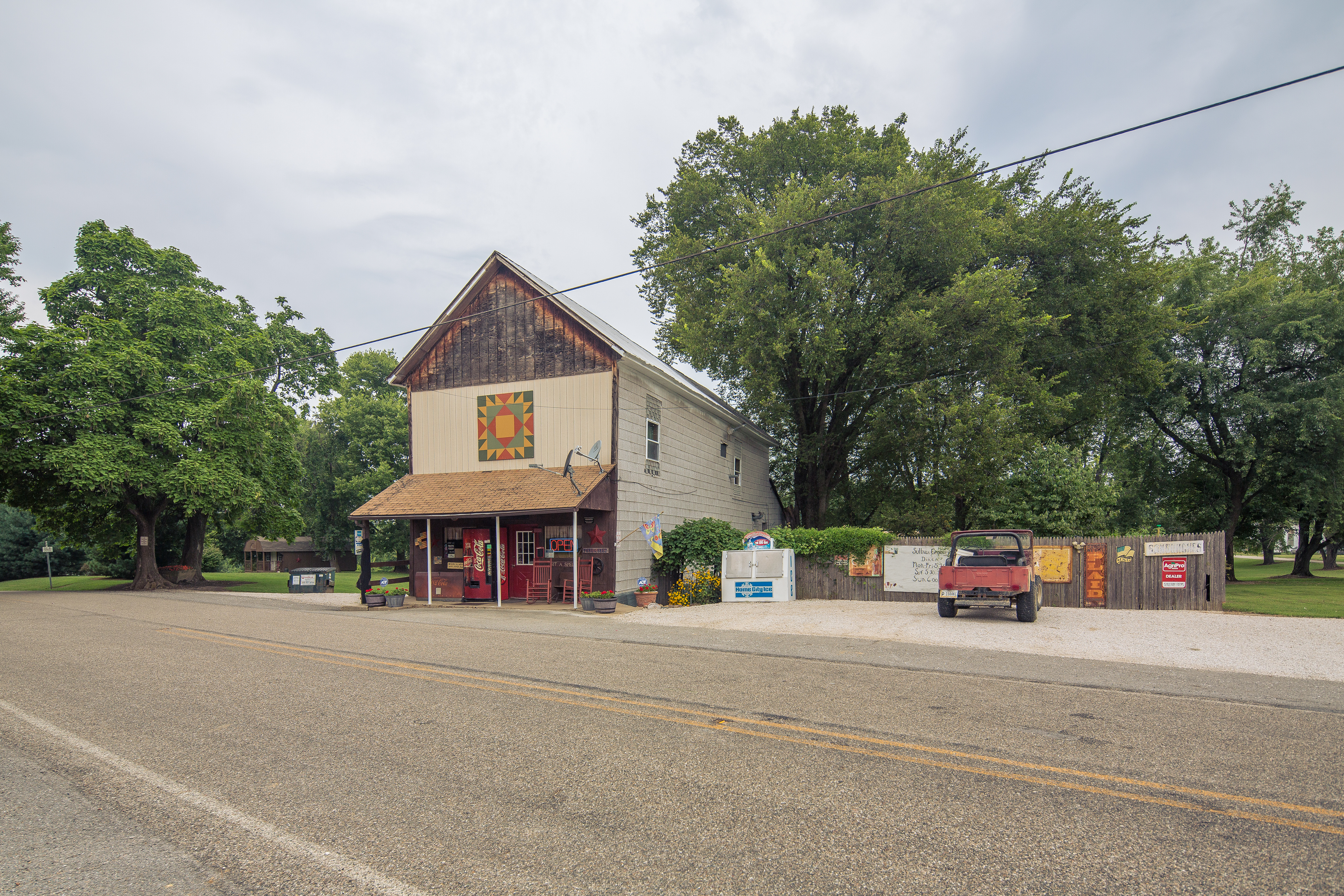
- Union store

- Location within Indiana Location within the United States
- Coordinates: 38°27′55″N 87°26′05″W
- Country: United States
- State: Indiana
- County: Pike
- Township: Clay
- Elevation: 469 ft (143 m)
- Time zone: UTC-5 (Eastern (EST))
  - Summer (DST): UTC-4 (EDT)
- ZIP code: 47640
- Area code: 812
- GNIS feature ID: 445046

Union is an unincorporated community in Clay Township, Pike County, in the U.S. state of Indiana.

== History ==
A post office was established at Union in 1845, and remained in operation until 1955. The community may be named after Uniontown, Pennsylvania, the native home of an early settler.

== Education ==
There is one school district in the county, Pike County School Corporation.

Prior to 1937, Union had its own high school. The school colors were green and white, and the mascot was the Eagles. In 1937 students were moved to Petersburg High School. That school, in turn, merged into Pike Central High School in 1974.
