= Muren, Indiana =

Unincorporated community in Indiana, United States

- Unincorporated community
- Location within Indiana Location within the United States
- Coordinates: 38°21′59″N 87°16′08″W
- Country: United States
- State: Indiana
- County: Pike
- Township: Patoka
- Elevation: 443 ft (135 m)
- Time zone: UTC-5 (Eastern (EST))
  - Summer (DST): UTC-4 (EDT)
- ZIP code: 47598
- Area code: 812
- GNIS feature ID: 439888

Muren is an unincorporated community in Patoka Township, Pike County, in the U.S. state of Indiana.

== History ==
A post office was established at Muren in 1905, and remained in operation until it was discontinued in 1910.
