= Logan Township, Pike County, Indiana =

Logan Township Pike County
- Township
- Location in Pike County
- Coordinates: 38°25′01″N 87°21′33″W
- Country: United States
- State: Indiana
- County: Pike

Government
  - Type: Indiana township

Area
  - Total: 24.31 sq mi (63.0 km^{2})
  - Land: 23.94 sq mi (62.0 km^{2})
  - Water: 0.37 sq mi (0.96 km^{2}) 1.52%
- Elevation: 446 ft (136 m)

Population (2020)
  - Total: 440
  - Density: 18/sq mi (7.1/km^{2})
- ZIP codes: 47567, 47598
- GNIS feature ID: 453580

Logan Township is one of nine townships in Pike County, Indiana, United States. As of the 2020 census, its population was 440 and it contained 179 housing units.

Historical population
Census	Pop.	Note	%±
1890	1,226		—
1900	1,293		5.5%
1910	1,278		−1.2%
1920	988		−22.7%
1930	921		−6.8%
1940	911		−1.1%
1950	640		−29.7%
1960	531		−17.0%
1970	514		−3.2%
1980	380		−26.1%
1990	379		−0.3%
2000	335		−11.6%
2010	474		41.5%
2020	440		−7.2%
Source: US Decennial Census

== History ==
Logan Township was organized in 1846.

== Geography ==
According to the 2010 census, the township has a total area of 24.31 square miles (63.0 km^{2}), of which 23.94 square miles (62.0 km^{2}) (or 98.48%) is land and 0.37 square miles (0.96 km^{2}) (or 1.52%) is water. The Patoka River defines the township's southern border.

=== Unincorporated towns ===
- Coats Spring at 38.437548°N 87.390572°W
- Oatsville at 38.4069919°N 87.4075169°W
- Rumble at 38.435882°N 87.342793°W

(This list is based on USGS data and may include former settlements.)

=== Cemeteries ===
The township contains these seven cemeteries: Barnes, Beck, DeJarnett, Loveless, McGillem, Willis and Wilson.

=== Major highways ===
- I-69
- SR 57

== School districts ==
- Pike County School Corporation

== Political districts ==
- State House District 64
- State Senate District 48
