= Ayrshire, Indiana =

Unincorporated community in Indiana, United States

- Unincorporated community
- Location within Indiana Location within the United States
- Coordinates: 38°22′19″N 87°14′27″W
- Country: United States
- State: Indiana
- County: Pike
- Township: Patoka
- Elevation: 515 ft (157 m)
- Time zone: UTC-5 (Eastern (EST))
  - Summer (DST): UTC-4 (EDT)
- ZIP code: 47598
- Area code: 812
- GNIS feature ID: 430370

Ayrshire (/ˈæʃər/ ASH-ər) is an unincorporated community in Patoka Township, Pike County, in the U.S. state of Indiana.

== History ==
A post office was established at Ayrshire in 1886, and remained in operation until 1917. The community probably took its name from Ayrshire, in Scotland.
