= Algiers, Indiana =

Unincorporated community in Indiana, United States

- Unincorporated community
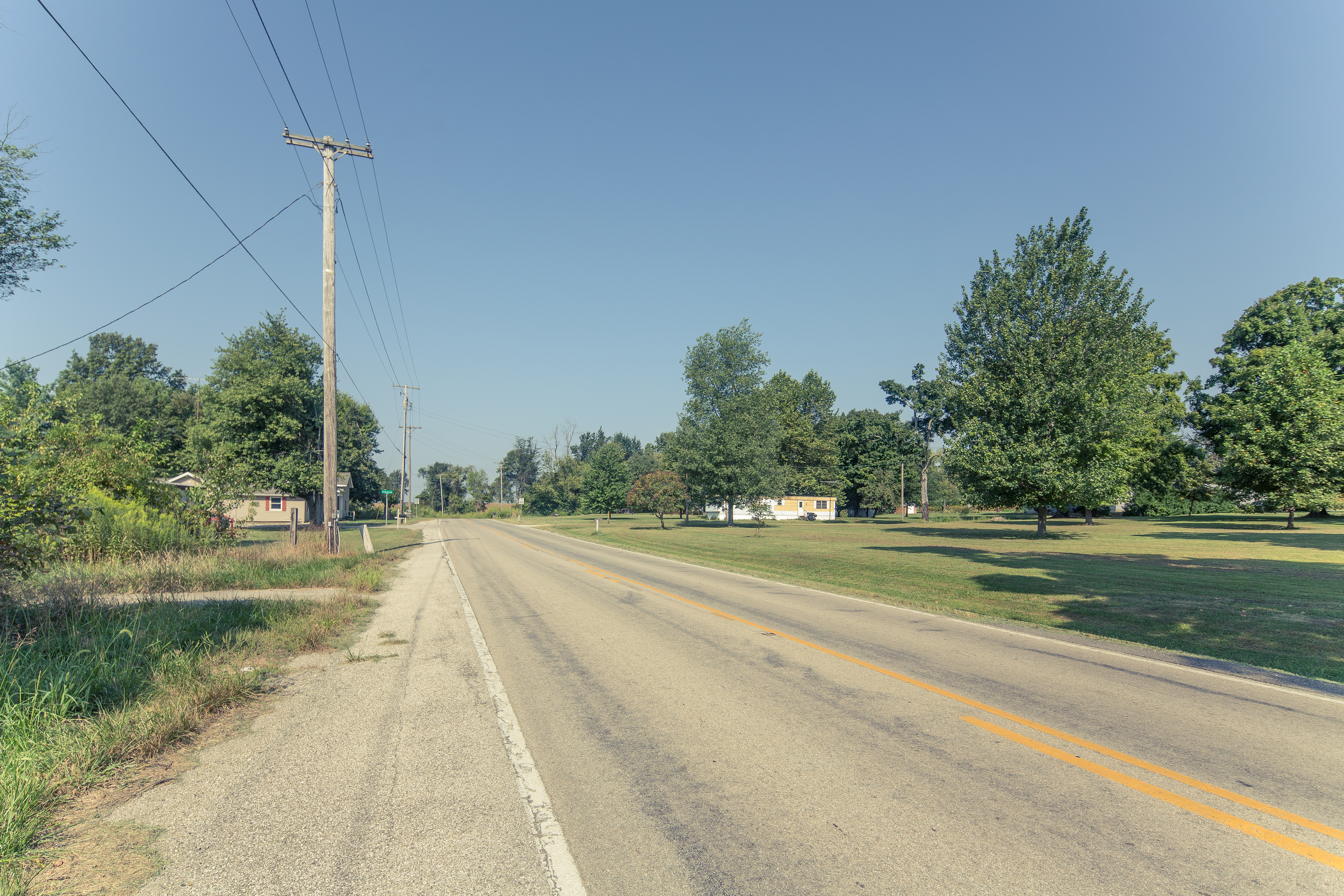

- Location within Indiana Location within the United States
- Coordinates: 38°29′14″N 87°10′30″W
- Country: United States
- State: Indiana
- County: Pike
- Township: Jefferson
- Elevation: 522 ft (159 m)
- Time zone: UTC-5 (Eastern (EST))
  - Summer (DST): UTC-4 (EDT)
- ZIP code: 47567
- Area codes: 812, 930
- GNIS feature ID: 430075

Algiers is an unincorporated community in Jefferson Township, Pike County, in the U.S. state of Indiana.

== History ==
Algiers was laid out in 1868. The community was named after Algiers, the capital of Algeria. An old variant name of the community was called Delectable.

Homer E. Capehart, a U.S. senator from Indiana and a pioneer in the jukebox and record player industry, was born in Algiers in 1897, the son of a local tenant farmer.

A post office called Algiers was established in 1885, and remained in operation until it was discontinued in 1955.

The town's name is part of the namesake of the Algiers, Winslow and Western Railway which operates within Pike County.

In March 2025, the path of an EF-2 tornado went through the eastern portion of Algiers. The community church sustained the most damage, primarily to the roof and siding.
