= Spurgeon, Indiana =

- Town
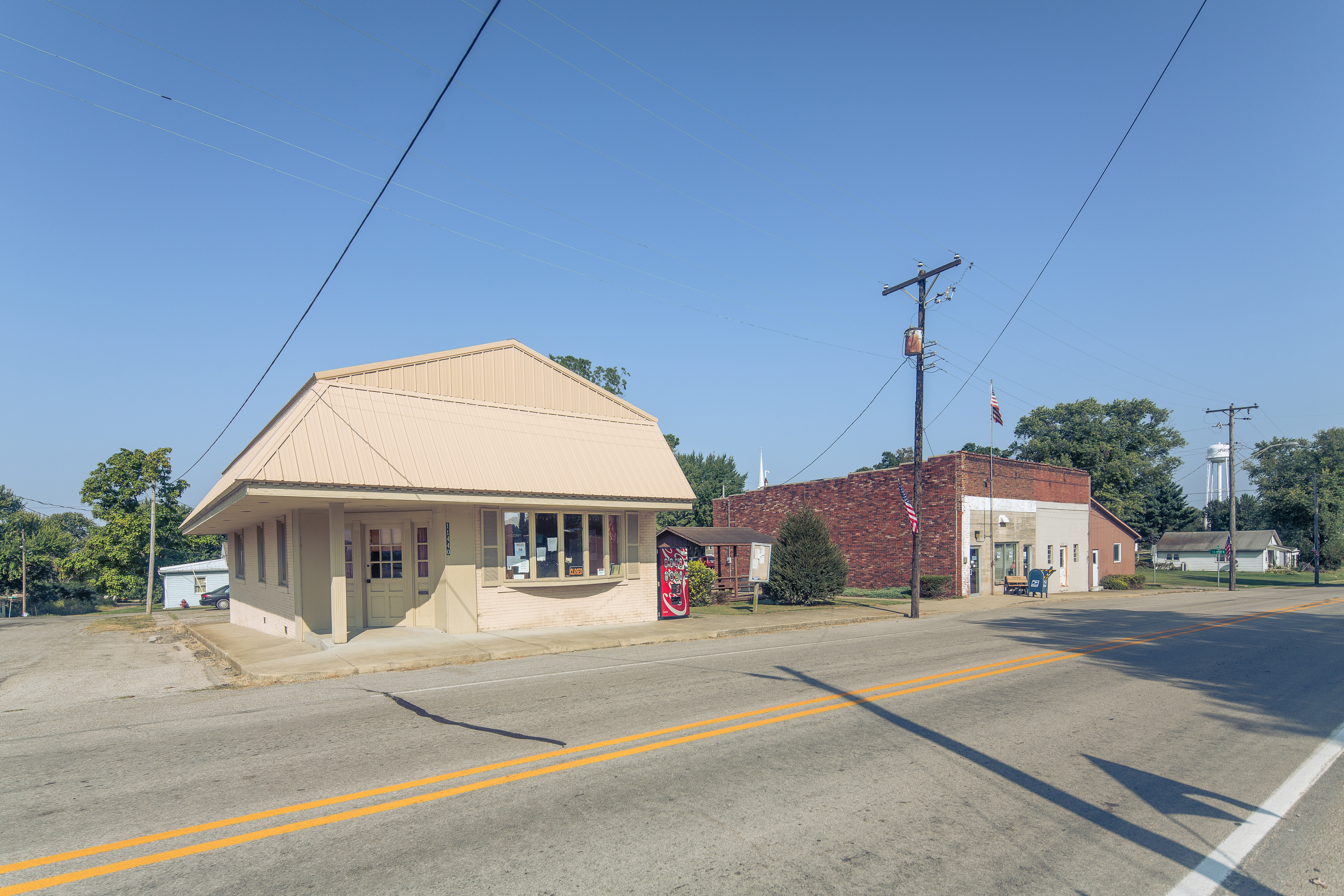

- Location of Spurgeon in Pike County, Indiana.
- Coordinates: 38°15′19″N 87°15′31″W
- Country: United States
- State: Indiana
- County: Pike
- Township: Monroe

Area
  - Total: 0.17 sq mi (0.45 km^{2})
  - Land: 0.17 sq mi (0.45 km^{2})
  - Water: 0 sq mi (0.00 km^{2})
- Elevation: 489 ft (149 m)

Population (2020)
  - Total: 172
  - Density: 980.7/sq mi (378.66/km^{2})
- Time zone: UTC-6 (Central (CST))
  - Summer (DST): UTC-5 (CDT)
- ZIP code: 47584
- Area code: 812
- FIPS code: 18-72440
- GNIS feature ID: 2397677
- Website: myspurgeon.com

Spurgeon is a town in Monroe Township, Pike County, in the U.S. state of Indiana. As of the 2020 census, Spurgeon had a population of 172. It is part of the Jasper Micropolitan Statistical Area.

== History ==
Spurgeon was originally called Pleasantville, and under the latter name was laid out in 1860. A post office has been in operation under the name Spurgeon since 1867.

== Geography ==
According to the 2010 census, Spurgeon has a total area of 0.18 square miles (0.47 km^{2}), all land.

== Demographics ==
Historical population
Census	Pop.	Note	%±
1930	375		—
1940	360		−4.0%
1950	327		−9.2%
1960	269		−17.7%
1970	285		5.9%
1980	250		−12.3%
1990	149		−40.4%
2000	227		52.3%
2010	207		−8.8%
2020	172		−16.9%
U.S. Decennial Census

=== 2010 census ===
As of the census of 2010, there were 207 people, 78 households, and 57 families living in the town. The population density was 1,150.0 inhabitants per square mile (444.0/km^{2}). There were 87 housing units at an average density of 483.3 per square mile (186.6/km^{2}). The racial makeup of the town was 95.7% White, 3.9% from other races, and 0.5% from two or more races. Hispanic or Latino of any race were 3.4% of the population.

There were 78 households, of which 30.8% had children under the age of 18 living with them, 60.3% were married couples living together, 7.7% had a female householder with no husband present, 5.1% had a male householder with no wife present, and 26.9% were non-families. 20.5% of all households were made up of individuals, and 3.9% had someone living alone who was 65 years of age or older. The average household size was 2.65 and the average family size was 3.02.

The median age in the town was 40.4 years. 25.1% of residents were under the age of 18; 9.1% were between the ages of 18 and 24; 21.3% were from 25 to 44; 34.3% were from 45 to 64; and 10.1% were 65 years of age or older. The gender makeup of the town was 51.2% male and 48.8% female.

=== 2000 census ===
As of the census of 2000, there were 227 people, 93 households, and 62 families living in the town. The population density was 1,299.1 inhabitants per square mile (501.6/km^{2}). There were 101 housing units at an average density of 578.0 per square mile (223.2/km^{2}). The racial makeup of the town was 99.12% White, 0.44% from other races, and 0.44% from two or more races. Hispanic or Latino of any race were 1.32% of the population.

There were 93 households, out of which 34.4% had children under the age of 18 living with them, 55.9% were married couples living together, 6.5% had a female householder with no husband present, and 32.3% were non-families. 30.1% of all households were made up of individuals, and 18.3% had someone living alone who was 65 years of age or older. The average household size was 2.44 and the average family size was 3.05.

In the town, the population was spread out, with 28.6% under the age of 18, 9.7% from 18 to 24, 30.8% from 25 to 44, 17.6% from 45 to 64, and 13.2% who were 65 years of age or older. The median age was 37 years. For every 100 females, there were 99.1 males. For every 100 females age 18 and over, there were 97.6 males.

The median income for a household in the town was $36,429, and the median income for a family was $44,375. Males had a median income of $27,031 versus $19,250 for females. The per capita income for the town was $16,850. About 3.2% of families and 4.1% of the population were below the poverty line, including 10.0% of those under the age of eighteen and 5.3% of those 65 or over.

== Education ==
There is one school district in the county, Pike County School Corporation.

Prior to 1966, it had its own high school. The school colors were black and red, and the mascot was the Cardinals. That year, it merged into Winslow High School. That school in turn merged into Pike Central High School in 1974.
