= Bowman, Indiana =

Unincorporated community in Indiana, United States

- Unincorporated community
- Location within Indiana Location within the United States
- Coordinates: 38°29′47″N 87°20′49″W
- Country: United States
- State: Indiana
- County: Pike
- Township: Madison
- Elevation: 430 ft (130 m)
- Time zone: UTC-5 (Eastern (EST))
  - Summer (DST): UTC-4 (EDT)
- ZIP code: 47567
- Area code: 812
- GNIS feature ID: 430070

Bowman is an unincorporated community in Madison Township, Pike County, in the U.S. state of Indiana.

== History ==
A post office was established at Bowman in 1888, and remained in operation until 1901. The community's name honors Jonathan Bowman, an early settler.
