= Rumble, Indiana =

Unincorporated community in Indiana, United States

- Unincorporated community
- Location within Indiana Location within the United States
- Coordinates: 38°26′09″N 87°20′34″W
- Country: United States
- State: Indiana
- County: Pike
- Township: Logan
- Elevation: 505 ft (154 m)
- Time zone: UTC-5 (Eastern (EST))
  - Summer (DST): UTC-4 (EDT)
- ZIP code: 47567
- Area code: 812
- GNIS feature ID: 442387

Rumble is an unincorporated community in Logan Township, Pike County, in the U.S. state of Indiana.

== History ==
A post office was established at Rumble in 1888, and remained in operation until it was discontinued in 1902. Eli F. Rumble served as an early postmaster.
