= Stendal, Indiana =

Unincorporated community in Indiana, United States

- Census-designated place
- Location within Indiana Location within the United States
- Coordinates: 38°16′0″N 87°8′40″W
- Country: United States
- State: Indiana
- County: Pike
- Township: Lockhart
- Elevation: 620 ft (190 m)
- Time zone: UTC-5 (Eastern (EST))
  - Summer (DST): UTC-4 (EDT)
- ZIP code: 47585
- Area code: 812
- GNIS feature ID: 2830495

Stendal is an unincorporated community and census designated place in southern Lockhart Township, Pike County, Indiana, United States. It lies along State Road 257, southeast of the city of Petersburg, the county seat of Pike County. Although Stendal is unincorporated, it has a post office, with the ZIP code of 47585.

Stendal is also part of Indiana's Lockhart Township and the U.S. Census Bureau's statistical Stendal census designated place (CDP).

== History ==
Stendal was laid out in 1867, and named after Stendal, in Germany. A post office has been in operation at Stendal since 1873.

=== Stendal High School and the Stendal Aces ===
In 1912, Lockhart Township built a frame building in Stendal to function as a new school. In addition to housing a grade school the building also served as a new high school, registered that same year. However, the high school was not certified until 1923. In addition to the student base of Lockhart Township, the Stendal High School provided students from surrounding townships with an opportunity for a high school education. It had neither a gymnasium nor an assembly room. In early years, basketball and the Junior and Senior class plays were the only extra-curricular activities offered.

In the midst to the great depression in 1932, the principal of Stendal High School was the highest paid among the six high school principals in Pike County, despite the depression era times.

The athletic teams of Stendal High were known as the 'Aces'. Despite the fact that Stendal did not have a gymnasium, the "Gym-less Wonders" won 3 Pike County Tournaments (1927–28, 1928–29 and 1929–30) behind the star power of Indiana Basketball Hall of Famer, Kern McGlothlin. The Aces also won three IHSAA Sectional titles (1930–31, 1931–32 and 1938–39) in Boys' Basketball; they advanced to the Finals of the 1938–39 Vincennes Regional before losing to long-time power Vincennes Lincoln.

McGlothlin would return to Stendal as the head coach of the Aces, following a collegiate career at Evansville College. McGlothlin would accumulate a record of 319–134, including positions at Cynthiana, Greencastle, Cannelton, and Winslow in Indiana. Much of his IHSAA success came at Winslow, coaching fellow Hall of Famer, Dick Farley.

Stendal High closed in 1966. The last person to graduate was Carolyn McFarland, née Bone, Class of '66 valedictorian.

== Education ==
There is one school district in the county, Pike County School Corporation.

Prior to 1966, Stendal had its own high school, Stendal High School, which had a mascot, the Aces. The school did not have a gymnasium oriented for basketball teams. Within the area, the people called the school's athletic teams the "gymless wonders". In 1966, Stendal High merged into Winslow High School. That school in turn merged into Pike Central High School in 1974.

== Demographics ==
Historical population
Census	Pop.	Note	%±
2023 (est.)	138

The United States Census Bureau defined Stendal as a census designated place in the 2022 American Community Survey.

== Notable people ==
- Vance Hartke, U.S. senator from Indiana
