= Otwell, Indiana =

- Census-designated place
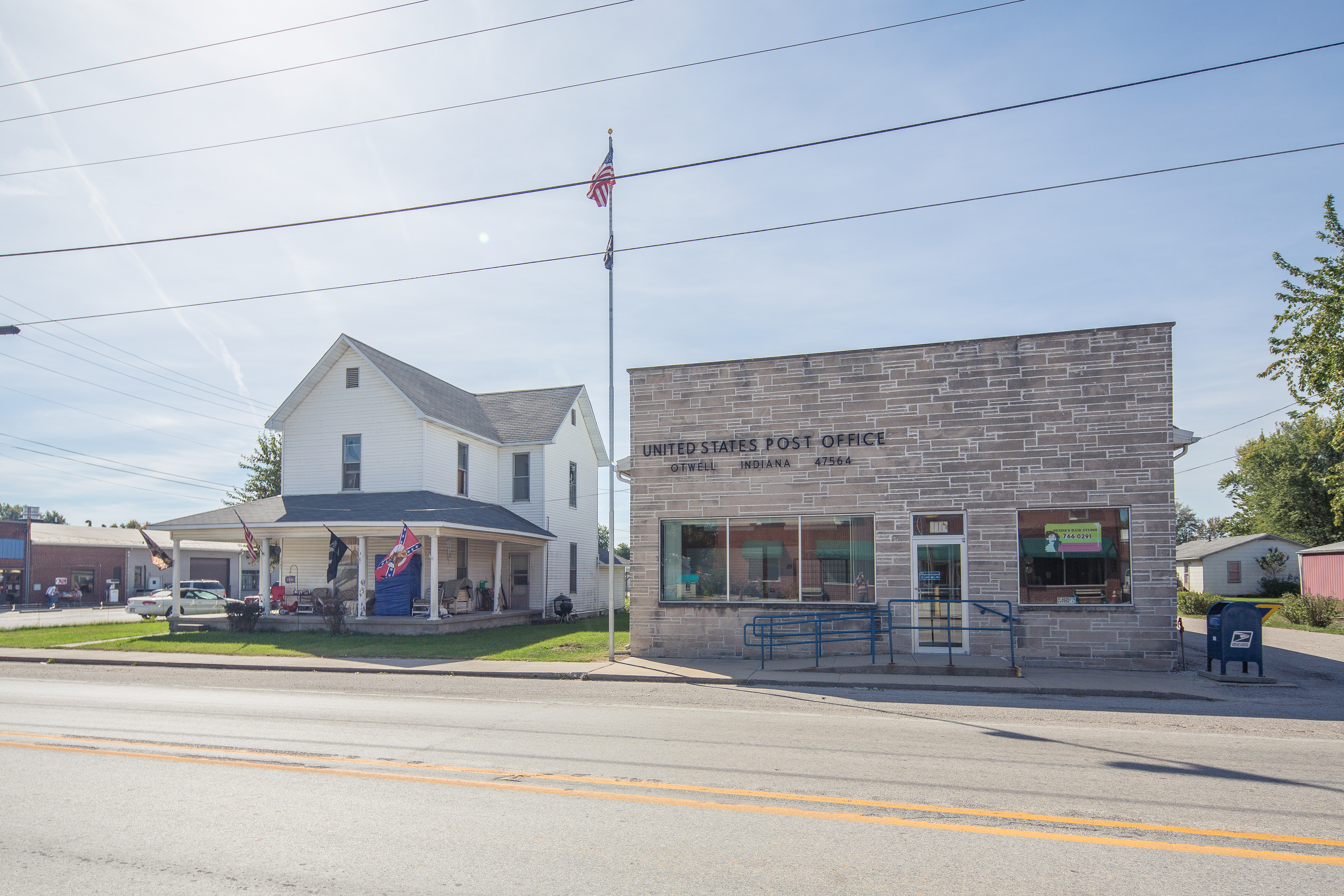

- Location of Otwell in Pike County, Indiana.
- Coordinates: 38°27′24″N 87°05′45″W
- Country: United States
- State: Indiana
- County: Pike
- Township: Jefferson
- Named for: Robert Otwell Brown

Area
  - Total: 1.79 sq mi (4.63 km^{2})
  - Land: 1.78 sq mi (4.62 km^{2})
  - Water: 0.0039 sq mi (0.01 km^{2})
- Elevation: 499 ft (152 m)

Population (2020)
  - Total: 396
  - Density: 221.9/sq mi (85.67/km^{2})
- Time zone: UTC-5 (Eastern (EST))
  - Summer (DST): UTC-4 (EDT)
- ZIP code: 47564
- Area codes: 812, 930
- FIPS code: 18-57384
- GNIS feature ID: 2629881

Otwell is an unincorporated census-designated place in Jefferson Township, Pike County, in the U.S. state of Indiana. As of the 2020 census, Otwell had a population of 396.

== History ==
Otwell was originally called Pierceville, being named after President Franklin Pierce, and under this name was laid out in 1855. The name was changed to Otwell in 1864 by a popular petition of its residents. The name had to be changed when the post office came because there was already a Pierceville in Indiana. The name Otwell is derived from the middle name of Robert Otwell Brown, the son of an early settler.

A post office has been in operation at Otwell since 1864.

== Geography ==
Otwell is located along Indiana State Road 257 and is approximately 1 mile from Indiana State Road 56.

== Education ==
There is one school district in the county, Pike County School Corporation.

Otwell has a charter school, Otwell Miller Academy, which was established in 2017, after the Pike County school corporation closed its elementary school, Otwell Elementary School. Otwell Miller Academy currently enrolls 88 students for the 2018/19 school year. Grace College sponsors the charter.

Prior to 1974, Otwell had its own high school. The school colors were blue and white, and the mascot was the Millers. In 1937, it took students from Velpen High School. In 1974, it merged into Pike Central High School.

Otwell has a public library, a branch of the Pike County Public Library.

== Demographics ==
Historical population
Census	Pop.	Note	%±
2020	396		—
U.S. Decennial Census
