= Hartwell, Indiana =

Unincorporated community in Indiana, U.S.

- Unincorporated community
- Location within Indiana Location within the United States
- Coordinates: 38°19′21″N 87°10′47″W
- Country: United States
- State: Indiana
- County: Pike
- Township: Lockhart
- Elevation: 600 ft (180 m)
- Time zone: UTC-5 (Eastern (EST))
  - Summer (DST): UTC-4 (EDT)
- ZIP code: 47567
- Area code: 812
- GNIS feature ID: 435841

Hartwell is an unincorporated community in Lockhart Township, Pike County, in the U.S. state of Indiana.

== History ==
An old variant name of the community was called Cabel. A post office called Cabel was established in 1898, and remained in operation until 1903.
