= Jefferson Township, Pike County, Indiana =

Jefferson Township Pike County
- Township
- Location in Pike County
- Coordinates: 38°29′01″N 87°08′42″W
- Country: United States
- State: Indiana
- County: Pike

Government
  - Type: Indiana township

Area
  - Total: 53.13 sq mi (137.6 km^{2})
  - Land: 52.51 sq mi (136.0 km^{2})
  - Water: 0.63 sq mi (1.6 km^{2}) 1.19%
- Elevation: 502 ft (153 m)

Population (2020)
  - Total: 1,797
  - Density: 34.22/sq mi (13.21/km^{2})
- ZIP codes: 47564, 47567, 47590, 47598
- GNIS feature ID: 453495

Jefferson Township is one of nine townships in Pike County, Indiana, United States. As of the 2020 census, its population was 1,797 and it contained 813 housing units.

Historical population
Census	Pop.	Note	%±
1890	2,474		—
1900	2,792		12.9%
1910	2,425		−13.1%
1920	2,068		−14.7%
1930	1,786		−13.6%
1940	1,845		3.3%
1950	1,773		−3.9%
1960	1,757		−0.9%
1970	1,653		−5.9%
1980	1,657		0.2%
1990	1,626		−1.9%
2000	1,773		9.0%
2010	1,814		2.3%
2020	1,797		−0.9%
Source: US Decennial Census

== Geography ==
According to the 2010 census, the township has a total area of 53.13 square miles (137.6 km^{2}), of which 52.51 square miles (136.0 km^{2}) (or 98.83%) is land and 0.63 square miles (1.6 km^{2}) (or 1.19%) is water. The White River defines the township's north border, as well as the north border of Pike County.

=== Unincorporated towns ===
- Algiers at 38.487272°N 87.175009°W
- Cato at 38.436717°N 87.185564°W
- Highbank Town at 38.514494°N 87.150287°W
- Iva at 38.502828°N 87.119452°W
- Otwell at 38.454773°N 87.092228°W

(This list is based on USGS data and may include former settlements.)

=== Cemeteries ===
The township contains these eight cemeteries: Arnold, Bluff, Case, Chapel, Independent Order of Odd Fellows, Logan, McClure and Willis.

=== Major highways ===
- I-69
- SR 56
- SR 356
- SR 257

== School districts ==
- Pike County School Corporation
- Otwell Miller Academy, Public Charter School. Grades K-5

== Political districts ==
- State House District 63
- State Senate District 48
