= Coats Spring, Indiana =

Unincorporated community in Indiana, United States

- Unincorporated community
- Location within Indiana Location within the United States
- Coordinates: 38°26′15″N 87°23′26″W
- Country: United States
- State: Indiana
- County: Pike
- Township: Logan
- Elevation: 535 ft (163 m)
- Time zone: UTC-5 (Eastern (EST))
  - Summer (DST): UTC-4 (EDT)
- ZIP code: 47567
- Area code: 812
- GNIS feature ID: 432715

Coats Spring is an unincorporated community in Logan Township, Pike County, in the U.S. state of Indiana.

== History ==
The community was named for James Coates, who started a mineral spa at Coats Spring in 1867.

A post office was established at Coats Spring in 1874, and remained in operation until it was discontinued in 1903.
