= Highbank Town, Indiana =

Unincorporated community in Indiana, United States

- Unincorporated community
- Location within Indiana Location within the United States
- Coordinates: 38°30′52″N 87°09′01″W
- Country: United States
- State: Indiana
- County: Pike
- Township: Jefferson
- Elevation: 446 ft (136 m)
- Time zone: UTC-5 (Eastern (EST))
  - Summer (DST): UTC-4 (EDT)
- ZIP code: 47564
- Area code: 812
- GNIS feature ID: 452178

Highbank Town is an unincorporated community in Jefferson Township, Pike County, in the U.S. state of Indiana.

== History ==
Formerly known simply as High Banks, the community was so named for its location on a river bluff. A post office called High Banks was established in 1819, and remained in operation until it was discontinued in 1859. The community was laid out in 1837.
