= Littles, Indiana =

Unincorporated community in Indiana, United States

- Unincorporated community
- Location within Indiana Location within the United States
- Coordinates: 38°24′04″N 87°17′14″W
- Country: United States
- State: Indiana
- County: Pike
- Township: Patoka
- Elevation: 505 ft (154 m)
- Time zone: UTC-5 (Eastern (EST))
  - Summer (DST): UTC-4 (EDT)
- ZIP code: 47598
- Area code: 812
- GNIS feature ID: 438183

Littles is an unincorporated community in Patoka Township, Pike County, in the U.S. state of Indiana. A post office was established there in 1890, and remained in operation until 1929. The town was named after a coal mine proprietor with the surname Little.
