= Clay Township, Pike County, Indiana =

Clay Township Pike County
- Township
- Location in Pike County
- Coordinates: 38°29′24″N 87°25′30″W
- Country: United States
- State: Indiana
- County: Pike

Government
  - Type: Indiana township

Area
  - Total: 23.95 sq mi (62.0 km^{2})
  - Land: 23.58 sq mi (61.1 km^{2})
  - Water: 0.37 sq mi (0.96 km^{2}) 1.54%
- Elevation: 463 ft (141 m)

Population (2020)
  - Total: 325
  - Density: 13.8/sq mi (5.32/km^{2})
- ZIP codes: 47567, 47640
- GNIS feature ID: 453217

Clay Township is one of nine townships in Pike County, Indiana, United States. As of the 2020 census, its population was 325 and it contained 137 housing units.

As of the 2010 census, the United States Census Bureau reported that 2010 median center of population of the United States was in Clay Township, 7.1 miles (11.4 km) southwest of Petersburg.

Historical population
Census	Pop.	Note	%±
1890	1,178		—
1900	1,257		6.7%
1910	1,049		−16.5%
1920	832		−20.7%
1930	626		−24.8%
1940	607		−3.0%
1950	459		−24.4%
1960	409		−10.9%
1970	368		−10.0%
1980	374		1.6%
1990	358		−4.3%
2000	340		−5.0%
2010	349		2.6%
2020	325		−6.9%
Source: US Decennial Census

== Geography ==
According to the 2010 census, the township has a total area of 23.95 square miles (62.0 km^{2}), of which 23.58 square miles (61.1 km^{2}) (or 98.46%) is land and 0.37 square miles (0.96 km^{2}) (or 1.54%) is water. The White River defines the north border of the township, as well as the north border of Pike County.

=== Unincorporated towns ===
- Union at 38.465325°N 87.434741°W

(This list is based on USGS data and may include former settlements.)

=== Cemeteries ===
The township contains these five cemeteries: Bethlehem, Catt, Frederick, Independent Order of Odd Fellows and Odd Fellows.

== School districts ==
- Pike County School Corporation

== Political districts ==
- State House District 64
- State Senate District 48
