= Iva, Indiana =

Unincorporated community in Indiana, United States

- Unincorporated community
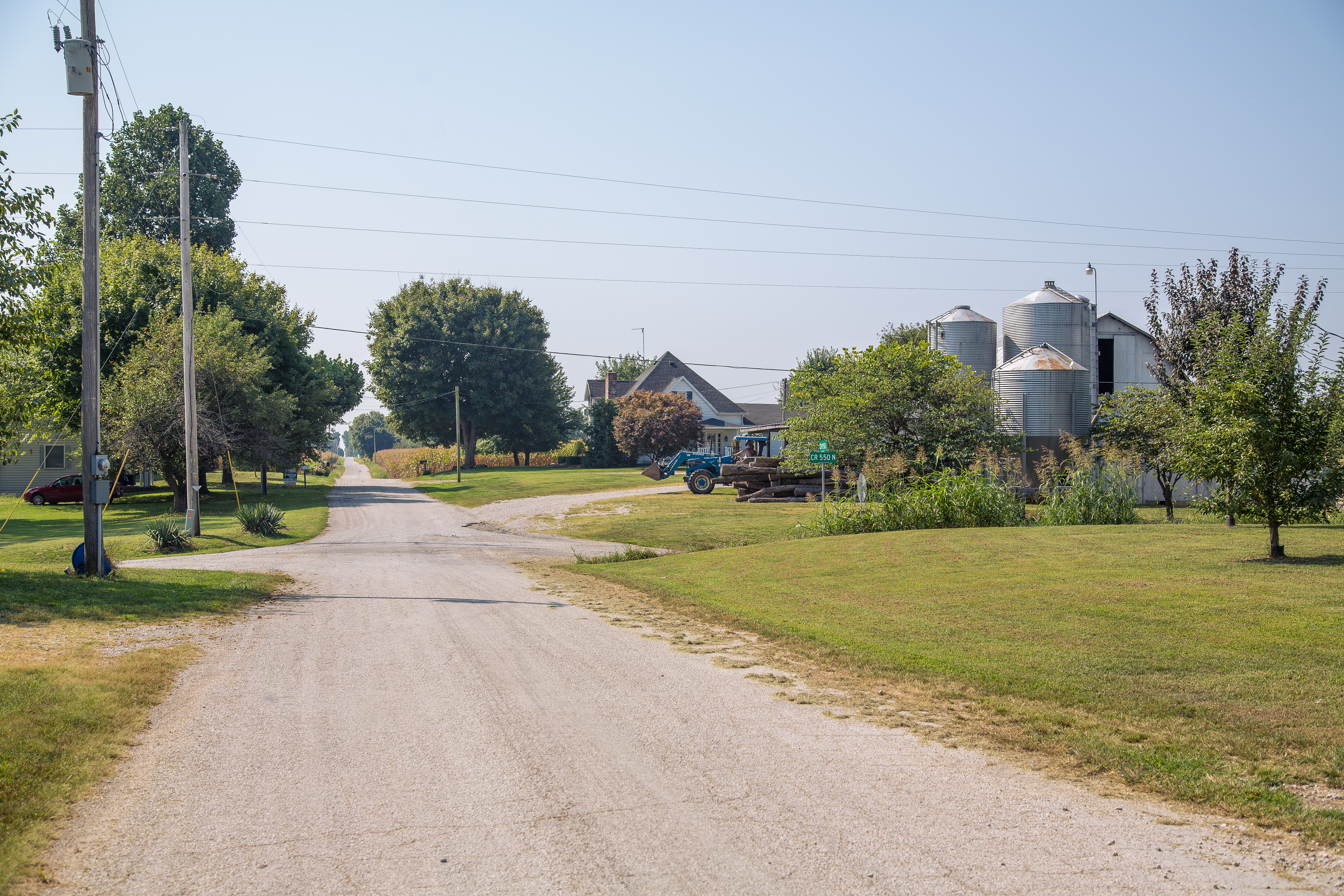

- Location within Indiana Location within the United States
- Coordinates: 38°30′10″N 87°07′10″W
- Country: United States
- State: Indiana
- County: Pike
- Township: Jefferson
- Elevation: 495 ft (151 m)

Population
  - Total: 434
- ZIP code: 47564
- Area codes: 812, 930
- GNIS feature ID: 436858

Iva is an unincorporated community in Jefferson Township, Pike County, in the U.S. state of Indiana.

== History ==
A post office was established at Iva in 1893, and remained in operation until it was discontinued in 1901.
