= Johnsburg, Indiana =

- Unincorporated community
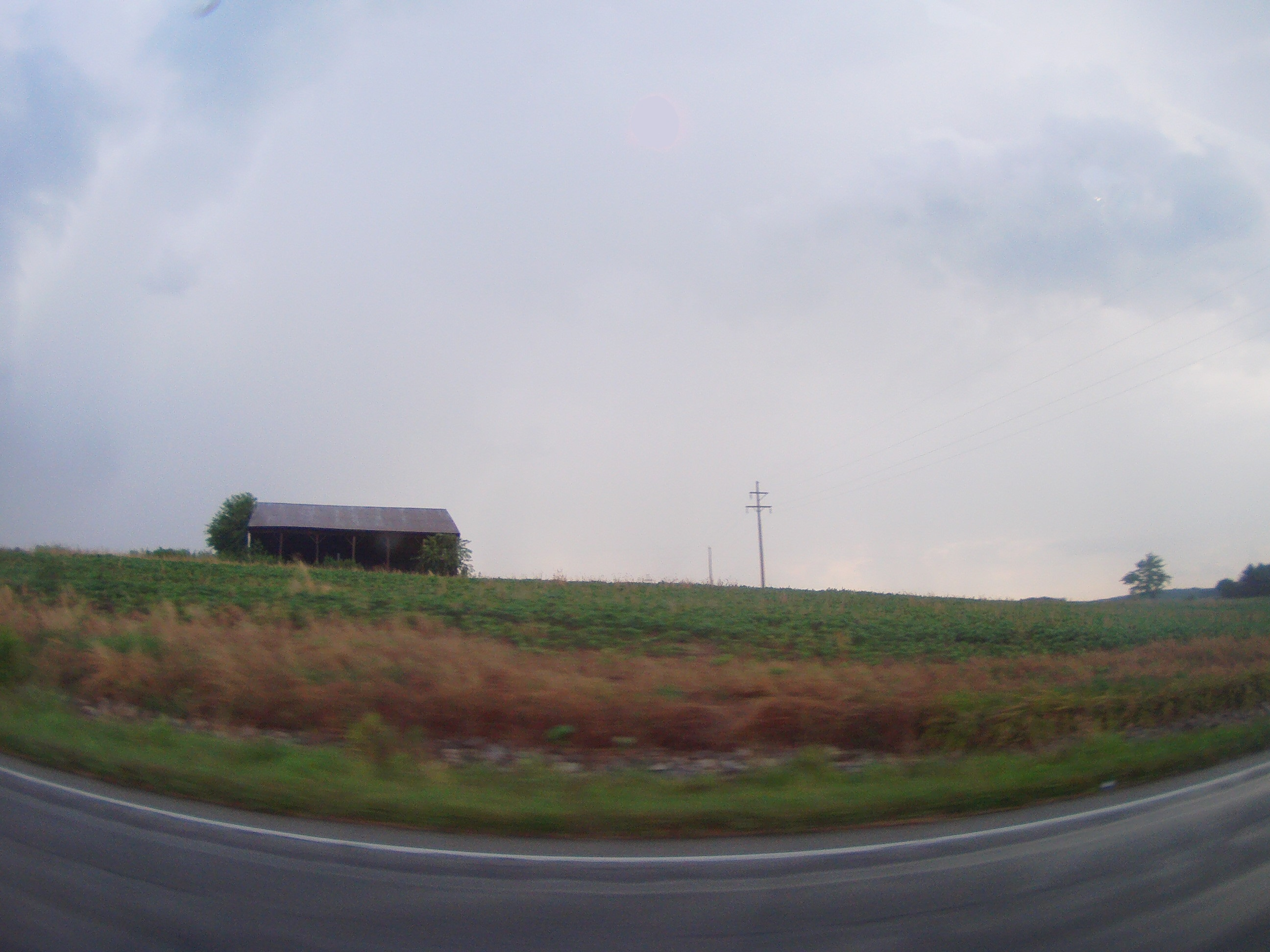
- A view from a car passing through western Johnsburg, Indiana, in 2013.

- Location within Indiana Location within the United States
- Coordinates: 38°13′04″N 86°57′20″W
- Country: United States
- State: Indiana
- County: Dubois
- Township: Cass
- Elevation: 486 ft (148 m)
- Time zone: UTC-5 (Eastern (EST))
  - Summer (DST): UTC-4 (EDT)
- ZIP code: 47523
- Area codes: 812, 930
- FIPS code: 18-38592
- GNIS feature ID: 449677

Johnsburg is an unincorporated community in Cass Township, Dubois County, in the U.S. state of Indiana.

== History ==
Johnsburg was one of the first railroad stations in the county.

A post office was established at Johnsburg in 1879, and remained in operation until it was discontinued in 1930.
