= Marion Township, Pike County, Indiana =

Marion Township Pike County
- Township
- Location in Pike County
- Coordinates: 38°22′54″N 87°07′48″W
- Country: United States
- State: Indiana
- County: Pike

Government
  - Type: Indiana township

Area
  - Total: 36.11 sq mi (93.5 km^{2})
  - Land: 35.41 sq mi (91.7 km^{2})
  - Water: 0.7 sq mi (1.8 km^{2}) 1.94%
- Elevation: 518 ft (158 m)

Population (2020)
  - Total: 683
  - Density: 19.3/sq mi (7.45/km^{2})
- ZIP codes: 47564, 47590, 47598
- GNIS feature ID: 453611

Marion Township is one of nine townships in Pike County, Indiana, United States. As of the 2020 census, its population was 683 and it contained 297 housing units.

Historical population
Census	Pop.	Note	%±
1890	1,729		—
1900	1,749		1.2%
1910	1,337		−23.6%
1920	1,071		−19.9%
1930	718		−33.0%
1940	811		13.0%
1950	613		−24.4%
1960	510		−16.8%
1970	516		1.2%
1980	587		13.8%
1990	580		−1.2%
2000	776		33.8%
2010	724		−6.7%
2020	683		−5.7%
Source: US Decennial Census

== History ==
Marion Township was organized in 1857.

== Geography ==
According to the 2010 census, the township has a total area of 36.11 square miles (93.5 km^{2}), of which 35.41 square miles (91.7 km^{2}) (or 98.06%) is land and 0.7 square miles (1.8 km^{2}) (or 1.94%) is water.

=== Unincorporated towns ===
- Hartwell Junction at 38.360606°N 87.140839°W
- Survant at 38.373939°N 87.155284°W
- Velpen at 38.355329°N 87.101948°W
- White Sulphur Springs at 38.385607°N 87.091948°W
- Whiteoak at 38.409495°N 87.146396°W

(This list is based on USGS data and may include former settlements.)

=== Cemeteries ===
The township contains these six cemeteries: Beadles, Bruster Branch, Corn, Flat Creek, Hayes and Walnut Grove.

=== Lakes ===
- Patoka Lake

== School districts ==
- Pike County School Corporation

== Political districts ==
- State House District 63
- State Senate District 48
