= Cato, Indiana =

Unincorporated community in Indiana, United States

- Unincorporated community
- Location within Indiana Location within the United States
- Coordinates: 38°26′12″N 87°11′08″W
- Country: United States
- State: Indiana
- County: Pike
- Township: Jefferson
- Elevation: 489 ft (149 m)
- Time zone: UTC-5 (Eastern (EST))
  - Summer (DST): UTC-4 (EDT)
- ZIP code: 47598
- Area code: 812
- GNIS feature ID: 432243

Cato is an unincorporated community in Jefferson Township, Pike County, in the U.S. state of Indiana.

== History ==
A post office was established at Cato in 1894, and remained in operation until it was discontinued in 1903. According to Ronald L. Baker, the community may be named after Cato, New York.
