= Pike County, Indiana =

County in Indiana, United States

- County
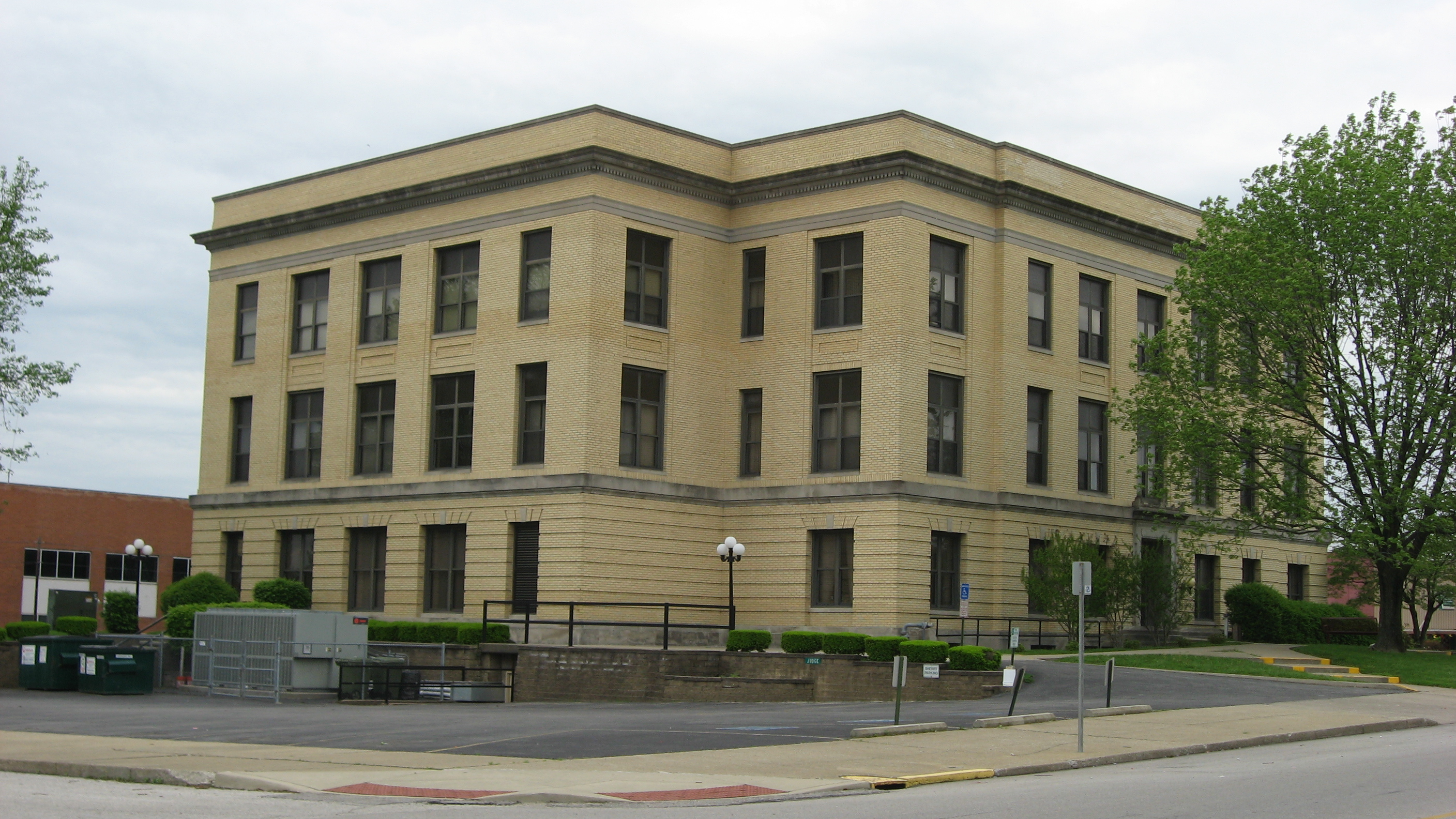
- Pike County Courthouse in Petersburg

- Location within the U.S. state of Indiana
- Coordinates: 38°24′N 87°14′W
- Country: United States
- State: Indiana
- Founded: December 21, 1816
- Named for: Zebulon Pike
- Seat: Petersburg
- Largest city: Petersburg

Area
  - Total: 341.09 sq mi (883.4 km^{2})
  - Land: 334.24 sq mi (865.7 km^{2})
  - Water: 6.86 sq mi (17.8 km^{2}) 2.01%

Population (2020)
  - Total: 12,250
  - Estimate (2025): 12,003 ▼
  - Density: 36.65/sq mi (14.15/km^{2})
- Time zone: UTC−5 (Eastern)
  - Summer (DST): UTC−4 (EDT)
- Congressional district: 8th
- Website: www.pikecounty.in.gov
- Indiana county number 63; First county created after statehood; 2010 median center of U.S. population

Pike County is a county in the southwest portion of the U.S. state of Indiana. As of the 2020 United States census, the population was 12,250. The county seat is Petersburg. It contains the geographic point representing the median center of US population in 2010.

== History ==
In 1787, the fledgling United States defined the Northwest Territory, which included the area of present-day Indiana. In 1800, Congress separated Ohio from the Northwest Territory, designating the rest of the land as the Indiana Territory. President Thomas Jefferson chose William Henry Harrison as the territory's first governor, and Vincennes was established as the territorial capital. After the Michigan Territory was separated and the Illinois Territory was formed, Indiana was reduced to its current size and geography. On December 11, 1816, the Indiana Territory was admitted to the Union as a state.

Starting in 1794, Native American titles to Indiana lands were extinguished by usurpation, purchase, or war and treaty. The United States acquired land from the Native Americans in the Vincennes Tract, in the 1804 Treaty of Vincennes, and in the 1809 treaty of Fort Wayne . These various dealings resolved the occupation issue for the future Pike County. Whites had been settling in the future county's terrain since 1800 (the first was Woolsey Pride, at White Oak Springs).

The area of present-day Pike County was first placed under local jurisdiction in 1790, when Knox County was created. This all-encompassing county was repeatedly subdivided as its lands were occupied − on April 1, 1813, the County of Gibson was authorized from the SW portion of Knox County, and four weeks later another portion of Knox was partitioned to create Warrick County. On November 1, 1814, portions of Warrick and Gibson were partitioned to create Perry County. Two years later, the northern portions of Gibson and Perry were sufficiently populated to warrant a separate governing structure, so on December 21, 1816 − ten days after being admitted to the Federal Union as a state − the Indiana state legislature authorized the creation of Pike County, taking areas from Gibson, Knox, and Perry counties. The first commissioners filed a report dated February 15, 1817, naming Petersburg as the seat of government; the city was laid out and platted that same year. The city was named for Peter Brenton, an original owner of the town site. A post office was put into service at Petersburg in 1823.

Pike County was named for Zebulon Pike, famous for his Pike Expedition of 1806–1807, exploring the southwest portion of the Louisiana Purchase. Pike commanded the 4th Infantry Regiment at the Battle of Tippecanoe in 1811. He was killed as a brigadier general during the War of 1812 after his men had captured York (now Toronto), Canada.

The first courthouse in Pike County was a two-story log building, laid on the east side of the Petersburg public square in 1817. It remained in use until replaced by a two-story brick building in 1834. The third courthouse was a larger two-story structure, built in 1868; The present building was erected in 1922.

Pike County served as the setting for both the 1943 Sterling North children's book, Midnight and Jeremiah and its' motion picture adaptation, the 1948 Walt Disney live-action/animation hybrid musical drama So Dear to My Heart, both of which were set in the early 1900s and specifically in the case of the movie version, in 1903 in the fictional town of Fulton Corners in Pike County, Indiana.

From 1959 to 1963 Vance Hartke and Homer E. Capehart were the U.S. senators for Indiana, both from Pike County.

In 2015, northern Pike County's economy received a boost from the completion of Interstate 69.

== Geography ==
The low hills of Pike County have been cleared, leveled, and put to agricultural use, although its many drainages are still wooded. The highest point on the terrain (650 feet; 200 meters ASL) is the sharp crest of a ridge 2.9 miles (4.7 km) NE of Stendal. Like many counties along or near the Ohio River, large portions of Pike County had been strip mined. Most of these areas have been restored, but many remain.

The county's northern boundary is defined by the westward-flowing White River. The Patoka River also flows westward through the lower central part of the county, and forms a portion of the county's west boundary line with Gibson County.

According to the 2010 census, the county has a total area of 341.09 square miles (883.4 km^{2}), of which 334.24 square miles (865.7 km^{2}) (or 97.99%) is land and 6.86 square miles (17.8 km^{2}) (or 2.01%) is water.

=== Adjacent counties ===
- Daviess County − northeast
- Dubois County − east
- Warrick County − south/CT Border
- Gibson County − west/CT Border
- Knox County − northwest

=== Major highways ===
- Interstate 69
- SR 56
- SR 57
- SR 61
- SR 64
- SR 65
- SR 257
- SR 356
- SR 364

=== Protected areas ===
- Columbia Mine Preserve (part)
- Interlake State Recreation Area (part)
- Patoka River National Wildlife Refuge and Management Area (part)
- Indiana Department of Natural Resources Division of Fish and Wildlife - Sugar Ridge Fish & Wildlife Area

=== City ===
- Petersburg

=== Towns ===
- Spurgeon
- Winslow

=== Census-designated place ===
- Otwell

=== Unincorporated places ===
- Alford
- Algiers
- Arthur Junction
- Ashby Yards
- Augusta
- Ayrshire
- Bowman
- Campbelltown
- Cato
- Coats Spring
- Coe
- Enos Corner
- Fritz Corner
- Glezen
- Hartwell
- Hedden, Indiana
- Highbank Town
- Iva
- Littles
- Marysville
- Muren
- Oatsville
- Pikeville
- Rumble
- Stendal
- Survant
- Union
- Velpen
- West Petersburg
- White Sulphur Springs
- Whiteoak
- Willisville
- Zoar

=== Townships ===
- Clay
- Jefferson
- Lockhart
- Logan
- Madison
- Marion
- Monroe
- Patoka
- Washington

== Climate and weather ==
Petersburg, Indiana

Climate chart (precipitation, max. and min. temperature)
J	F	M	A	M	J	J	A	S	O	N	D
3 38 21	2.7 44 25	4.1 54 33	4.2 66 44	5.1 75 54	3.8 83 63	4.2 87 67	3.8 86 65	3 80 57	2.8 69 45	4.5 55 36	3.4 43 26
- █ Average max. and min. temperatures in °F
- █ Precipitation totals in inches
- Source: The Weather Channel
Metric conversion
J	F	M	A	M	J	J	A	S	O	N	D
75 3 −6	69 7 −4	103 12 1	107 19 7	131 24 12	97 28 17	106 31 19	96 30 18	75 27 14	72 21 7	114 13 2	87 6 −3
- █ Average max. and min. temperatures in °C
- █ Precipitation totals in mm

In recent years, average temperatures in Petersburg have ranged from a low of 21 °F (−6 °C) in January to a high of 87 °F (31 °C) in July, although a record low of −18 °F (−28 °C) was recorded in December 1989 and a record high of 101 °F (38 °C) was recorded in September 2002. Average monthly precipitation ranged from 2.73 inches (69 mm) in February to 5.14 inches (131 mm) in May.

== Government ==
The county government is a constitutional body, and is granted specific powers by the Constitution of Indiana, and by the Indiana Code.

County Council: The legislative branch of the county government; controls spending and revenue collection in the county. Representatives are elected to four-year terms from county districts. They set salaries, the annual budget, and special spending. The council has limited authority to impose local taxes, in the form of an income and property tax that is subject to state level approval, excise taxes, and service taxes.

Board of Commissioners: The executive body of the county; commissioners are elected county-wide to staggered four-year terms. One commissioner serves as president. The commissioners execute acts legislated by the council, collect revenue, and manage the county government.

Court: The county maintains a Circuit Court (83rd Judicial Circuit) and has a small claims division which division handles family law cases as well. The judge of the Circuit Court is elected to a term of six years and must be a member in good standing of the Indiana Bar. The judge is assisted by a referee in the small claims\family division who is appointed by the Circuit Court Judge.

County Officials: The county has other elected offices, including sheriff, coroner, auditor, treasurer, recorder, surveyor, and circuit court clerk. These officers are elected to four-year terms. Members elected to county government positions are required to declare party affiliations and to be residents of the county.

== Politics ==
Like many of its neighboring Southwest Indiana counties, Pike was a Republican-leaning swing county during the 20th Century. Since 2000, however, it has swung heavily Republican, giving Donald Trump over three-quarters of the vote in 2020 and 2024. Jimmy Carter was the last Democrat to carry the county by full majority, though Bill Clinton won the county by plurality more recently in 1992 and 1996.

United States presidential election results for Pike County, Indiana
Year	Republican		Democratic		Third party(ies)	
Year	No.	%	No.	%	No.	%
1888	2,197	50.02%	2,098	47.77%	97	2.21%
1892	2,038	47.47%	1,957	45.59%	298	6.94%
1896	2,332	47.42%	2,557	51.99%	29	0.59%
1900	2,420	48.71%	2,460	49.52%	88	1.77%
1904	2,596	51.81%	2,224	44.38%	191	3.81%
1908	2,359	47.88%	2,360	47.90%	208	4.22%
1912	1,515	34.76%	1,984	45.53%	859	19.71%
1916	2,172	46.71%	2,212	47.57%	266	5.72%
1920	4,069	51.75%	3,067	39.01%	727	9.25%
1924	3,885	48.78%	3,604	45.25%	476	5.98%
1928	4,190	54.61%	3,409	44.43%	74	0.96%
1932	3,193	40.26%	4,547	57.33%	191	2.41%
1936	3,885	43.74%	4,952	55.75%	45	0.51%
1940	4,672	50.91%	4,449	48.48%	56	0.61%
1944	4,267	54.11%	3,513	44.55%	106	1.34%
1948	3,696	49.60%	3,596	48.26%	160	2.15%
1952	4,253	54.26%	3,478	44.37%	107	1.37%
1956	4,596	57.34%	3,353	41.83%	66	0.82%
1960	4,606	59.69%	3,046	39.48%	64	0.83%
1964	2,703	37.17%	4,519	62.14%	50	0.69%
1968	3,087	45.38%	2,953	43.41%	762	11.20%
1972	4,252	61.28%	2,648	38.16%	39	0.56%
1976	3,138	44.19%	3,938	55.46%	25	0.35%
1980	3,343	48.09%	3,346	48.13%	263	3.78%
1984	3,689	52.98%	3,231	46.40%	43	0.62%
1988	3,294	51.70%	3,037	47.67%	40	0.63%
1992	2,156	33.84%	2,960	46.46%	1,255	19.70%
1996	2,174	36.99%	2,780	47.29%	924	15.72%
2000	3,566	56.59%	2,605	41.34%	131	2.08%
2004	3,745	60.29%	2,418	38.92%	49	0.79%
2008	3,221	53.43%	2,700	44.79%	107	1.78%
2012	3,627	61.20%	2,125	35.86%	174	2.94%
2016	4,398	73.58%	1,297	21.70%	282	4.72%
2020	4,692	75.37%	1,415	22.73%	118	1.90%
2024	4,610	76.67%	1,314	21.85%	89	1.48%

== Demographics ==
Historical population
Census	Pop.	Note	%±
1820	1,472		—
1830	2,475		68.1%
1840	4,769		92.7%
1850	7,720		61.9%
1860	10,078		30.5%
1870	13,779		36.7%
1880	16,383		18.9%
1890	18,544		13.2%
1900	20,486		10.5%
1910	19,684		−3.9%
1920	18,684		−5.1%
1930	16,361		−12.4%
1940	17,045		4.2%
1950	14,995		−12.0%
1960	12,797		−14.7%
1970	12,281		−4.0%
1980	13,465		9.6%
1990	12,509		−7.1%
2000	12,837		2.6%
2010	12,845		0.1%
2020	12,250		−4.6%
2025 (est.)	12,003	▼	−2.0%
US Decennial Census; 1790–1960 1900–1990; 1990–2000 2010

=== Racial and ethnic composition ===
Pike County, Indiana – Racial and ethnic composition Note: the US Census treats Hispanic/Latino as an ethnic category. This table excludes Latinos from the racial categories and assigns them to a separate category. Hispanics/Latinos may be of any race.
Race / Ethnicity (NH = Non-Hispanic)	Pop 1980	Pop 1990	Pop 2000	Pop 2010	Pop 2020	% 1980	% 1990	% 2000	% 2010	% 2020
White alone (NH)	13,330	12,433	12,666	12,544	11,666	99.00%	99.39%	98.67%	97.66%	95.23%
Black or African American alone (NH)	12	2	11	38	31	0.09%	0.02%	0.09%	0.30%	0.25%
Native American or Alaska Native alone (NH)	26	15	16	25	39	0.19%	0.12%	0.12%	0.19%	0.32%
Asian alone (NH)	19	18	18	25	15	0.14%	0.14%	0.14%	0.19%	0.12%
Native Hawaiian or Pacific Islander alone (NH)	x	x	5	3	0	x	x	0.04%	0.02%	0.00%
Other race alone (NH)	2	1	0	8	11	0.01%	0.01%	0.00%	0.06%	0.09%
Mixed race or Multiracial (NH)	x	x	47	82	308	x	x	0.37%	0.64%	2.51%
Hispanic or Latino (any race)	76	40	74	120	180	0.56%	0.32%	0.58%	0.93%	1.47%
Total	13,465	12,509	12,837	12,845	12,250	100.00%	100.00%	100.00%	100.00%	100.00%

=== 2020 census ===
As of the 2020 census, the county had a population of 12,250. The median age was 43.7 years. 22.4% of residents were under the age of 18 and 20.3% of residents were 65 years of age or older. For every 100 females there were 101.9 males, and for every 100 females age 18 and over there were 101.2 males age 18 and over.

The racial makeup of the county was 95.6% White, 0.3% Black or African American, 0.3% American Indian and Alaska Native, 0.1% Asian, <0.1% Native Hawaiian and Pacific Islander, 0.5% from some other race, and 3.1% from two or more races. Hispanic or Latino residents of any race comprised 1.5% of the population.

<0.1% of residents lived in urban areas, while 100.0% lived in rural areas.

There were 4,972 households in the county, of which 29.6% had children under the age of 18 living in them. Of all households, 54.2% were married-couple households, 18.8% were households with a male householder and no spouse or partner present, and 20.4% were households with a female householder and no spouse or partner present. About 26.6% of all households were made up of individuals and 12.8% had someone living alone who was 65 years of age or older.

There were 5,581 housing units, of which 10.9% were vacant. Among occupied housing units, 82.5% were owner-occupied and 17.5% were renter-occupied. The homeowner vacancy rate was 1.6% and the rental vacancy rate was 7.9%.

=== 2010 census ===
As of the 2010 United States census, there were 12,845 people, 5,186 households, and 3,645 families in the county. The population density was 38.4 inhabitants per square mile (14.8/km^{2}). There were 5,735 housing units at an average density of 17.2 units per square mile (6.6 units/km^{2}). The racial makeup of the county was 98.2% white, 0.3% black or African American, 0.2% Asian, 0.2% American Indian, 0.3% from other races, and 0.8% from two or more races. Those of Hispanic or Latino origin made up 0.9% of the population. In terms of ancestry, 25.7% were American, 25.1% were German, 15.8% were Irish, and 11.4% were English.

Of the 5,186 households, 29.6% had children under the age of 18 living with them, 57.3% were married couples living together, 8.5% had a female householder with no husband present, 29.7% were non-families, and 25.5% of all households were made up of individuals. The average household size was 2.44 and the average family size was 2.90. The median age was 42.8 years.

The median income for a household in the county was $47,697 and the median income for a family was $49,423. Males had a median income of $40,952 versus $29,664 for females. The per capita income for the county was $20,005. About 9.0% of families and 12.9% of the population were below the poverty line, including 16.0% of those under age 18 and 10.0% of those age 65 or over, Making Pike County one of the poorest counties in the state.

== Education ==
There is one school district in the county, Pike County School Corporation. It operates one high school, Pike Central High School.

== See also ==
- National Register of Historic Places listings in Pike County, Indiana
