= Enos Corner, Indiana =

Unincorporated community in Indiana, United States

- Unincorporated community
- Location within Indiana Location within the United States
- Coordinates: 38°17′21″N 87°15′40″W
- Country: United States
- State: Indiana
- County: Pike
- Township: Monroe
- Elevation: 446 ft (136 m)
- Time zone: UTC-5 (Eastern (EST))
  - Summer (DST): UTC-4 (EDT)
- ZIP code: 47660
- Area codes: 812, 930
- GNIS feature ID: 434216

Enos Corner is an unincorporated community in Monroe Township, Pike County, in the U.S. state of Indiana.
