= Saint Henry, Indiana =

- Unincorporated community
- Location within Indiana Location within the United States
- Coordinates: 38°13′03″N 86°55′43″W
- Country: United States
- State: Indiana
- County: Dubois
- Township: Cass
- Elevation: 564 ft (172 m)
- Time zone: UTC-5 (Eastern (EST))
  - Summer (DST): UTC-4 (EDT)
- ZIP code: 47532
- Area codes: 812, 930
- GNIS feature ID: 442543

Saint Henry is an unincorporated community in Cass Township, Dubois County, in the U.S. state of Indiana.

== History ==
Saint Henry was platted about 1874. The town was originally called Henryville, but was changed to Saint Henry because there was already a Henryville in Indiana.

A post office was established at Saint Henry in 1870, and remained in operation until it was discontinued in 1933.
