= Glezen, Indiana =

Unincorporated community in Indiana, United States

- Census designated place
- Location within Indiana Location within the United States
- Coordinates: 38°25′03″N 87°18′25″W
- Country: United States
- State: Indiana
- County: Pike
- Township: Patoka
- Elevation: 479 ft (146 m)
- Time zone: UTC-5 (Eastern (EST))
  - Summer (DST): UTC-4 (EDT)
- ZIP code: 47567
- Area code: 812
- GNIS feature ID: 2830494

Glezen is a Census designated place in Patoka Township, Pike County, in the U.S. state of Indiana.

== History ==
An old variant name of the community was called Hosmer. Hosmer was laid out in 1854 by Stephen R. Hosmer. A post office was established under the name Hosmer in 1870, the name was changed to Glezen in 1883, and the post office closed in 1965. The present name is for the Glezen (or Glezon) family of settlers.

== Demographics ==
The United States Census Bureau first delineated Glezen as a census designated place in the 2022 American Community Survey.
