= San Enrique =

San Enrique may refer to:

- San Enrique, Iloilo, Philippines
- San Enrique, Negros Occidental, Philippines
- San Enrique, Buenos Aires, a settlement in Veinticinco de Mayo Partido, Buenos Aires Province, Argentina
- San Enrique, Lo Barnechea, a neighborhood of Lo Barnechea, Chile
