= Patoka Township, Pike County, Indiana =

Patoka Township Pike County
- Township
- Location in Pike County
- Coordinates: 38°22′43″N 87°14′48″W
- Country: United States
- State: Indiana
- County: Pike

Government
  - Type: Indiana township

Area
  - Total: 43.81 sq mi (113.5 km^{2})
  - Land: 42.58 sq mi (110.3 km^{2})
  - Water: 1.23 sq mi (3.2 km^{2}) 2.81%
- Elevation: 453 ft (138 m)

Population (2020)
  - Total: 2,826
  - Density: 66.37/sq mi (25.63/km^{2})
- ZIP codes: 47567, 47598, 47660
- GNIS feature ID: 453710

Patoka Township is one of nine townships in Pike County, Indiana, United States. As of the 2020 census, its population was 2,826 and it contained 1,284 housing units.

Historical population
Census	Pop.	Note	%±
1890	3,095		—
1900	3,926		26.8%
1910	4,253		8.3%
1920	4,738		11.4%
1930	3,947		−16.7%
1940	4,150		5.1%
1950	3,808		−8.2%
1960	3,084		−19.0%
1970	2,898		−6.0%
1980	3,213		10.9%
1990	2,935		−8.7%
2000	3,169		8.0%
2010	3,062		−3.4%
2020	2,826		−7.7%
Source: US Decennial Census

== History ==
Patoka Township was organized in 1838.

== Geography ==
According to the 2010 census, the township has a total area of 43.81 square miles (113.5 km^{2}), of which 42.58 square miles (110.3 km^{2}) (or 97.19%) is land and 1.23 square miles (3.2 km^{2}) (or 2.81%) is water. The Patoka River flows through the township from east to west.

=== Cities, towns, villages ===
- Winslow

=== Unincorporated towns ===
- Arthur at 38.340605°N 87.245842°W
- Ayrshire at 38.371994°N 87.240843°W
- Campbelltown at 38.421438°N 87.240010°W
- Glezen at 38.416438°N 87.301124°W
- Littles at 38.40116°N 87.287234°W
- Marysville at 38.351993°N 87.278344°W
- Muren at 38.366438°N 87.268899°W

(This list is based on USGS data and may include former settlements.)

=== Cemeteries ===
The township contains these eight cemeteries: Crow, Hedges, Martin, Oak Hill, Sugar Ridge, Sunset, Williams and Wyatt.

=== Major highways ===
- I-69
- SR 61
- SR 64

== School districts ==
- Pike County School Corporation

== Political districts ==
- State House District 63
- State Senate District 48
