= Winslow, Indiana =

- Town
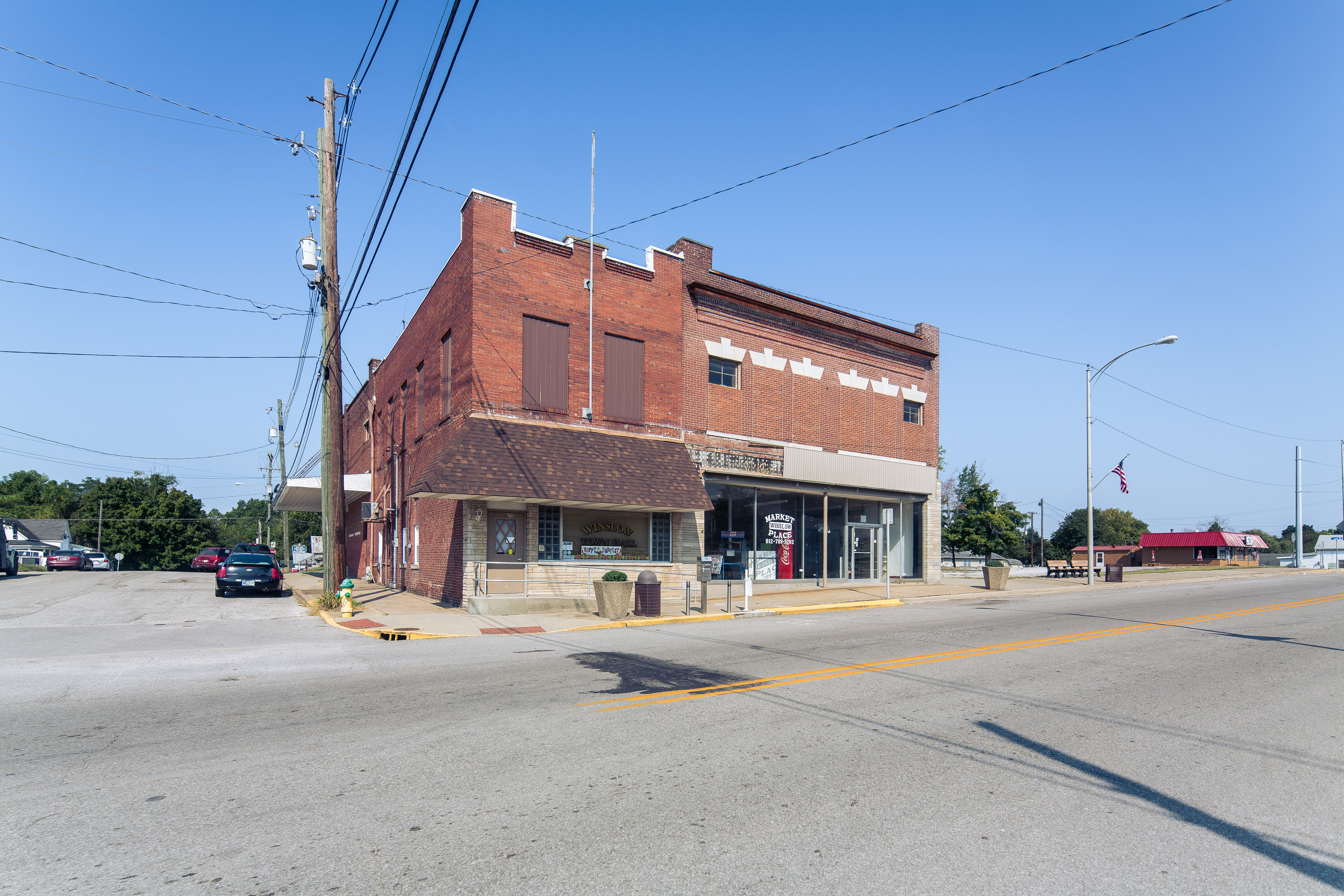

- Location of Winslow in Pike County, Indiana.
- Coordinates: 38°23′00″N 87°12′47″W
- Country: United States
- State: Indiana
- County: Pike
- Township: Patoka

Area
  - Total: 0.70 sq mi (1.81 km^{2})
  - Land: 0.69 sq mi (1.78 km^{2})
  - Water: 0.0077 sq mi (0.02 km^{2})
- Elevation: 459 ft (140 m)

Population (2020)
  - Total: 764
  - Density: 1,111.5/sq mi (429.15/km^{2})
- Time zone: UTC-5 (EST)
  - Summer (DST): UTC-4 (EDT)
- ZIP code: 47598
- Area code: 812
- FIPS code: 18-84968
- GNIS feature ID: 2397752

Winslow is a town in Patoka Township, Pike County, in the U.S. state of Indiana. The population was 764 at the 2020 census. It is part of the Jasper Micropolitan Statistical Area.

== History ==
Winslow was laid out in 1837. The town was named after William Winslow Hathaway, son of an early settler. A post office has been in operation at Winslow since 1839.

The town's name is part of the namesake of the Algers, Winslow and Western Railway which operates within Pike County, and passes through the community.

== Geography ==
According to the 2010 census, Winslow has a total area of 0.639 square miles (1.66 km^{2}), of which 0.63 square miles (1.63 km^{2}) (or 98.59%) is land and 0.009 square miles (0.02 km^{2}) (or 1.41%) is water.

=== Climate ===
The climate in this area is characterized by hot, humid summers and generally mild to cool winters. According to the Köppen Climate Classification system, Winslow has a humid subtropical climate, abbreviated "Cfa" on climate maps.

== Demographics ==
Historical population
Census	Pop.	Note	%±
1880	199		—
1900	536		—
1910	932		73.9%
1920	1,140		22.3%
1930	1,175		3.1%
1940	1,382		17.6%
1950	1,322		−4.3%
1960	1,089		−17.6%
1970	1,030		−5.4%
1980	1,017		−1.3%
1990	875		−14.0%
2000	881		0.7%
2010	864		−1.9%
2020	764		−11.6%
U.S. Decennial Census

=== 2010 census ===
As of the census of 2010, there were 864 people, 333 households, and 241 families living in the town. The population density was 1,371.4 inhabitants per square mile (529.5/km^{2}). There were 397 housing units at an average density of 630.2 per square mile (243.3/km^{2}). The racial makeup of the town was 97.8% White, 0.1% African American, 0.6% Native American, 0.1% Asian, 0.1% from other races, and 1.3% from two or more races. Hispanic or Latino of any race were 2.1% of the population.

There were 333 households, of which 34.5% had children under the age of 18 living with them, 52.3% were married couples living together, 15.0% had a female householder with no husband present, 5.1% had a male householder with no wife present, and 27.6% were non-families. 24.3% of all households were made up of individuals, and 12.9% had someone living alone who was 65 years of age or older. The average household size was 2.57 and the average family size was 3.01.

The median age in the town was 38.6 years. 26.5% of residents were under the age of 18; 9.7% were between the ages of 18 and 24; 22.2% were from 25 to 44; 25.7% were from 45 to 64; and 15.9% were 65 years of age or older. The gender makeup of the town was 46.9% male and 53.1% female.

=== 2000 census ===
As of the census of 2000, there were 881 people, 370 households, and 237 families living in the town. The population density was 1,367.1 inhabitants per square mile (527.8/km^{2}). There were 414 housing units at an average density of 642.4 per square mile (248.0/km^{2}). The racial makeup of the town was 98.18% White, 0.57% Native American, 0.68% Asian, and 0.57% from two or more races. Hispanic or Latino of any race were 1.59% of the population.

There were 370 households, out of which 28.4% had children under the age of 18 living with them, 47.3% were married couples living together, 11.4% had a female householder with no husband present, and 35.9% were non-families. 31.6% of all households were made up of individuals, and 16.2% had someone living alone who was 65 years of age or older. The average household size was 2.38 and the average family size was 2.96.

In the town, the population was spread out, with 25.3% under the age of 18, 9.1% from 18 to 24, 27.9% from 25 to 44, 20.7% from 45 to 64, and 17.0% who were 65 years of age or older. The median age was 38 years. For every 100 females, there were 98.0 males. For every 100 females age 18 and over, there were 94.7 males.

The median income for a household in the town was $28,672, and the median income for a family was $33,864. Males had a median income of $30,063 versus $19,259 for females. The per capita income for the town was $13,986. About 11.3% of families and 13.5% of the population were below the poverty line, including 18.1% of those under age 18 and 8.1% of those age 65 or over.

== Education ==
There is one school district in the county, Pike County School Corporation.

Prior to 1974, Winslow had its own high school. The school colors were purple and gold, and the mascot was the Eskimos. That year, it merged into Pike Central High School.

Winslow has a public library, a branch of the Pike County Public Library.

== Notable people ==
- Richard "Dick" Farley basketball player
