= Pikeville, Indiana =

Unincorporated community in Indiana, United States

- Unincorporated community
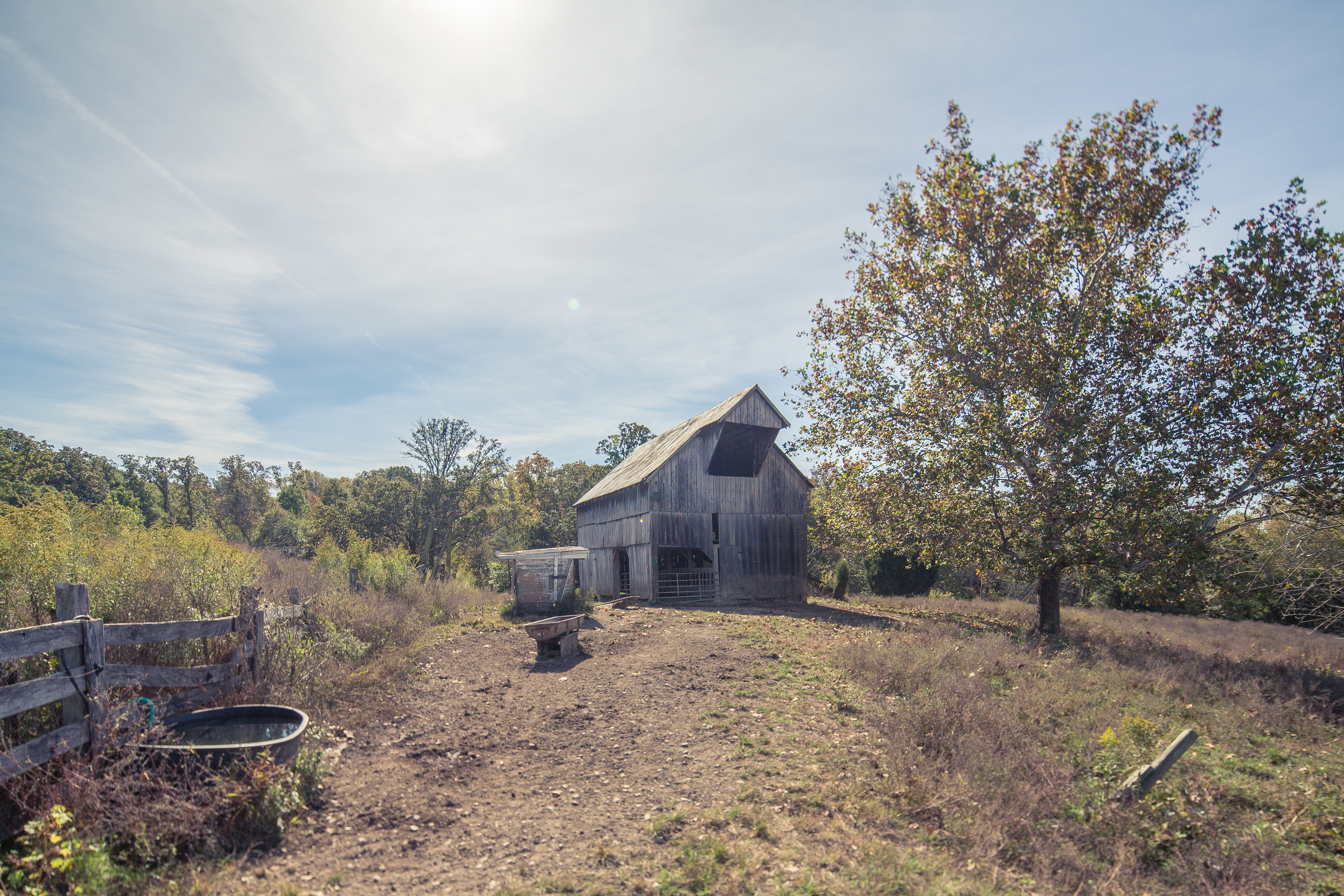
- Old barn near Pikeville

- Location within Indiana Location within the United States
- Coordinates: 38°19′19″N 87°06′41″W
- Country: United States
- State: Indiana
- County: Pike
- Township: Lockhart
- Elevation: 476 ft (145 m)
- Time zone: UTC-5 (Eastern (EST))
  - Summer (DST): UTC-4 (EDT)
- ZIP code: 47590
- Area codes: 812, 930
- GNIS feature ID: 441138

Pikeville is an unincorporated community in Lockhart Township, Pike County, in the U.S. state of Indiana.

== History ==
Pikeville was laid out in 1859. The community took its name from Pike County. A post office was established at Pikeville in 1867, and remained in operation until it was discontinued in 1938.
