= Velpen, Indiana =

Unincorporated community in Indiana, United States

- Census designated place
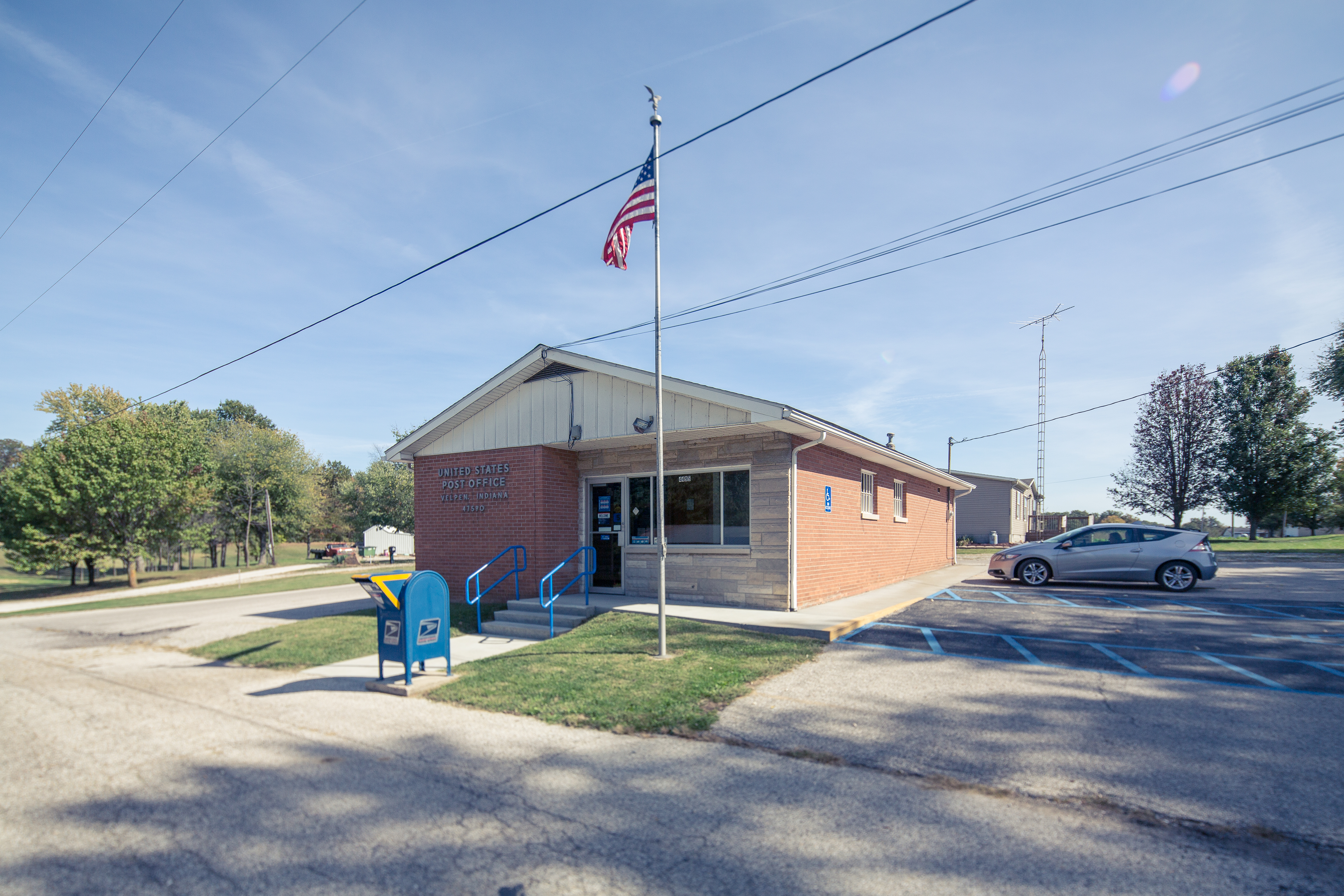

- Location within Indiana Location within the United States
- Coordinates: 38°21′19″N 87°6′7″W
- Country: United States
- State: Indiana
- County: Pike
- Township: Marion
- Elevation: 489 ft (149 m)
- Time zone: UTC-5 (Eastern (EST))
  - Summer (DST): UTC-4 (EDT)
- ZIP code: 47590
- Area codes: 812, 930
- GNIS feature ID: 445242

Velpen is a census-designated place in southeastern Marion Township, Pike County, in the U.S. state of Indiana. It lies along State Road 257 southeast of the city of Petersburg, the county seat of Pike County. Although Velpen is unincorporated, it has a post office, with the ZIP code of 47590.

== History ==
A post office has been in operation at Velpen since 1881. The community was named after the town of Velpe, Germany.

The Sweet Sulphur Springs near Velpen were renowned for their supposed medicinal properties and the hotel was a popular destination in the area.

== Education ==
There is one school district in the county, Pike County School Corporation.

Prior to 1937, Velpen had its own high school. The school colors were green and white, and the mascot was the Leopards. In 1937 students were moved to Otwell High School. That school, in turn, merged into Pike Central High School in 1974.

== Demographics ==
Historical population
Census	Pop.	Note	%±
2023 (est.)	23

The United States Census Bureau defined Velpen as a census designated place in the 2022 American Community Survey.
