= Indiana State Road 61 =

State highway in Indiana, United States

State Road 61
- SR 61 highlighted in red

Route information
- Maintained by INDOT
- Length: 65.182 mi (104.900 km)
- Existed: October 1, 1926–present

Major junctions
- South end: SR 66 near Newburgh
- I-64 in Lynnville; I-69 in Petersburg
- North end: Wabash Avenue in Vincennes

Location
- Country: United States
- State: Indiana
- Counties: Knox, Pike, Warrick

Highway system
- Indiana State Highway System; Interstate; US; State; Scenic
← SR 60	→ SR 62

State Road 61 is a 64-mile (103 km) north–south route that runs through portions of three counties in the southwest part of the U.S. state of Indiana.

== Route description ==
SR 61 begins at State Road 66 east of Newburgh near the Ohio River. From there it runs north toward Boonville where it is concurrent with State Road 62. After Boonville SR 61 heads north towards Petersburg, passing through Lynnville where SR 61 has an interchange with Interstate 64. After I-64, SR 61 heads northeast on its way to Petersburg. South of Petersburg, SR 61 has an interchange with Interstate 69. In Petersburg SR 61 is concurrent with State Road 56 and meets State Road 57. After Petersburg SR 61 heads toward Vincennes, passing through Monroe City where SR 61 and State Road 241 are concurrent. After Monroe City SR 61 heads northwest. Then SR 61 enters Vincennes, on Wabash Ave., Clair Street, and 6th Street. The northern terminus of SR 61 is at an interchange with U.S. Route 41, U.S. Route 50, and U.S. Route 150 on the northeast side of Vincennes.

== History ==
Between 1917 and 1926 SR 61 was an unnumbered road, and the SR 61 number was not given to any route. This is due to Indiana going from to SR 1 to SR 55. In 1926 Indiana Signed the route as SR 61. In Vincennes SR 61 ended at the old Route of US 41 (6th Street).

== Major intersections ==
County	Location	mi	km	Destinations	Notes
Warrick	Anderson Township	0.000	0.000	SR 66 – Evansville, Tell City	Southern terminus of SR 61
Warrick	Boonville	8.819	14.193	SR 62 west – Evansville	Western end of SR 62 concurrency
Warrick	Boonville	9.512	15.308	SR 62 east – Dale	Eastern end of SR 62 concurrency
Warrick	Lynnville	19.779– 19.890	31.831– 32.010	I-64 - St. Louis, Louisville	Exit number 39 on I-64
Warrick	Lynnville	20.070	32.300	SR 68 – New Harmony, Dale	
Pike	Patoka Township	32.268	51.930	SR 64 – Oakland City, Huntingburg	
Pike	Patoka Township	33.762	54.335	SR 364 east	Western terminus of SR 364
Pike	Washington Township	40.324	64.895	SR 56 east – Jasper	Southern end of SR 56 concurrency
Pike	Petersburg	41.714– 41.900	67.132– 67.432	I-69 – Evansville, Indianapolis	
Pike	Petersburg	44.848	72.176	SR 56 west / SR 57 – Princeton, Oakland City, Washington	Northern end of SR 56 concurrency
Knox	Monroe City	56.368	90.716	SR 241 north	Eastern end of SR 241 concurrency
Knox	Monroe City	56.819	91.441	SR 241 south	Western end of SR 241 concurrency
Knox	Vincennes	65.182	104.900	Wabash Avenue	Northern terminus of SR 61
1.000 mi = 1.609 km; 1.000 km = 0.621 mi: Concurrency terminus
