= Madison Township =

Madison Township may refer to:

== Arkansas ==
- Madison Township, Grant County, Arkansas, in Grant County, Arkansas
- Madison Township, Howard County, Arkansas, in Howard County, Arkansas
- Madison Township, St. Francis County, Arkansas, in St. Francis County, Arkansas

== Illinois ==
- Madison Township, Richland County, Illinois

== Indiana ==
- Madison Township, Allen County, Indiana
- Madison Township, Carroll County, Indiana
- Madison Township, Clinton County, Indiana
- Madison Township, Daviess County, Indiana
- Madison Township, Dubois County, Indiana
- Madison Township, Jay County, Indiana
- Madison Township, Jefferson County, Indiana
- Madison Township, Montgomery County, Indiana
- Madison Township, Morgan County, Indiana
- Madison Township, Pike County, Indiana
- Madison Township, Putnam County, Indiana
- Madison Township, St. Joseph County, Indiana
- Madison Township, Tipton County, Indiana
- Madison Township, Washington County, Indiana

== Iowa ==
- Madison Township, Buchanan County, Iowa
- Madison Township, Butler County, Iowa
- Madison Township, Clarke County, Iowa
- Madison Township, Fremont County, Iowa
- Madison Township, Hancock County, Iowa
- Madison Township, Johnson County, Iowa
- Madison Township, Jones County, Iowa
- Madison Township, Lee County, Iowa
- Madison Township, Madison County, Iowa
- Madison Township, Mahaska County, Iowa
- Madison Township, Polk County, Iowa
- Madison Township, Poweshiek County, Iowa
- Madison Township, Winneshiek County, Iowa

== Kansas ==
- Madison Township, Greenwood County, Kansas
- Madison Township, Lincoln County, Kansas, in Lincoln County, Kansas
- Madison Township, Riley County, Kansas, in Riley County, Kansas

== Michigan ==
- Madison Charter Township, Michigan, in Lenawee County

== Minnesota ==
- Madison Township, Lac qui Parle County, Minnesota

== Missouri ==
- Madison Township, Cedar County, Missouri
- Madison Township, Clark County, Missouri
- Madison Township, Grundy County, Missouri
- Madison Township, Harrison County, Missouri
- Madison Township, Johnson County, Missouri
- Madison Township, Mercer County, Missouri
- Madison Township, Jasper County, Missouri

== Nebraska ==
- Madison Township, Fillmore County, Nebraska

== New Jersey ==
- Madison Township, Middlesex County, New Jersey, now Old Bridge Township

== North Carolina ==
- Madison Township, Guilford County, North Carolina
- Madison Township, Rockingham County, North Carolina

== North Dakota ==
- Madison Township, Hettinger County, North Dakota, in Hettinger County, North Dakota

== Ohio ==
- Madison Township, Butler County, Ohio
- Madison Township, Clark County, Ohio
- Madison Township, Columbiana County, Ohio
- Madison Township, Fairfield County, Ohio
- Madison Township, Fayette County, Ohio
- Madison Township, Franklin County, Ohio
- Madison Township, Guernsey County, Ohio
- Madison Township, Hancock County, Ohio
- Madison Township, Highland County, Ohio
- Madison Township, Jackson County, Ohio
- Madison Township, Lake County, Ohio
- Madison Township, Licking County, Ohio
- Madison Township, Montgomery County, Ohio
- Madison Township, Muskingum County, Ohio
- Madison Township, Perry County, Ohio
- Madison Township, Pickaway County, Ohio
- Madison Township, Richland County, Ohio
- Madison Township, Sandusky County, Ohio
- Madison Township, Scioto County, Ohio
- Madison Township, Vinton County, Ohio
- Madison Township, Williams County, Ohio

== Pennsylvania ==
- Madison Township, Armstrong County, Pennsylvania
- Madison Township, Clarion County, Pennsylvania
- Madison Township, Columbia County, Pennsylvania
- Madison Township, Lackawanna County, Pennsylvania

== South Dakota ==
- Madison Township, Edmunds County, South Dakota, in Edmunds County, South Dakota
- Madison Township, Grant County, South Dakota, in Grant County, South Dakota
