= Madison Township, Pike County, Indiana =

Madison Township Pike County
- Township
- Location in Pike County
- Coordinates: 38°29′28″N 87°21′37″W
- Country: United States
- State: Indiana
- County: Pike

Government
  - Type: Indiana township

Area
  - Total: 22.07 sq mi (57.2 km^{2})
  - Land: 21.65 sq mi (56.1 km^{2})
  - Water: 0.42 sq mi (1.1 km^{2}) 1.90%
- Elevation: 446 ft (136 m)

Population (2020)
  - Total: 386
  - Density: 17.8/sq mi (6.88/km^{2})
- ZIP code: 47567
- GNIS feature ID: 453596

Madison Township is one of nine townships in Pike County, Indiana, United States. As of the 2020 census, its population was 386 and it contained 176 housing units.

Historical population
Census	Pop.	Note	%±
1890	825		—
1900	908		10.1%
1910	798		−12.1%
1920	838		5.0%
1930	737		−12.1%
1940	646		−12.3%
1950	550		−14.9%
1960	442		−19.6%
1970	415		−6.1%
1980	472		13.7%
1990	443		−6.1%
2000	406		−8.4%
2010	382		−5.9%
2020	386		1.0%
Source: US Decennial Census

== Geography ==
According to the 2010 census, the township has a total area of 22.07 square miles (57.2 km^{2}), of which 21.65 square miles (56.1 km^{2}) (or 98.10%) is land and 0.42 square miles (1.1 km^{2}) (or 1.90%) is water. The White River defines the township's northern border, as well as the northern border of Pike County.

=== Unincorporated towns ===
- Bartons Location at 38.529215°N 87.339460°W
- Bowman at 38.496437°N 87.346960°W

(This list is based on USGS data and may include former settlements.)

=== Cemeteries ===
The township contains these six cemeteries: Blaize, Fowler, Poplar Grove, Stewart, Weathers and Weist.

== School districts ==
- Pike County School Corporation

== Political districts ==
- State House District 64
- State Senate District 48
