= Monroe City, Indiana =

- Town
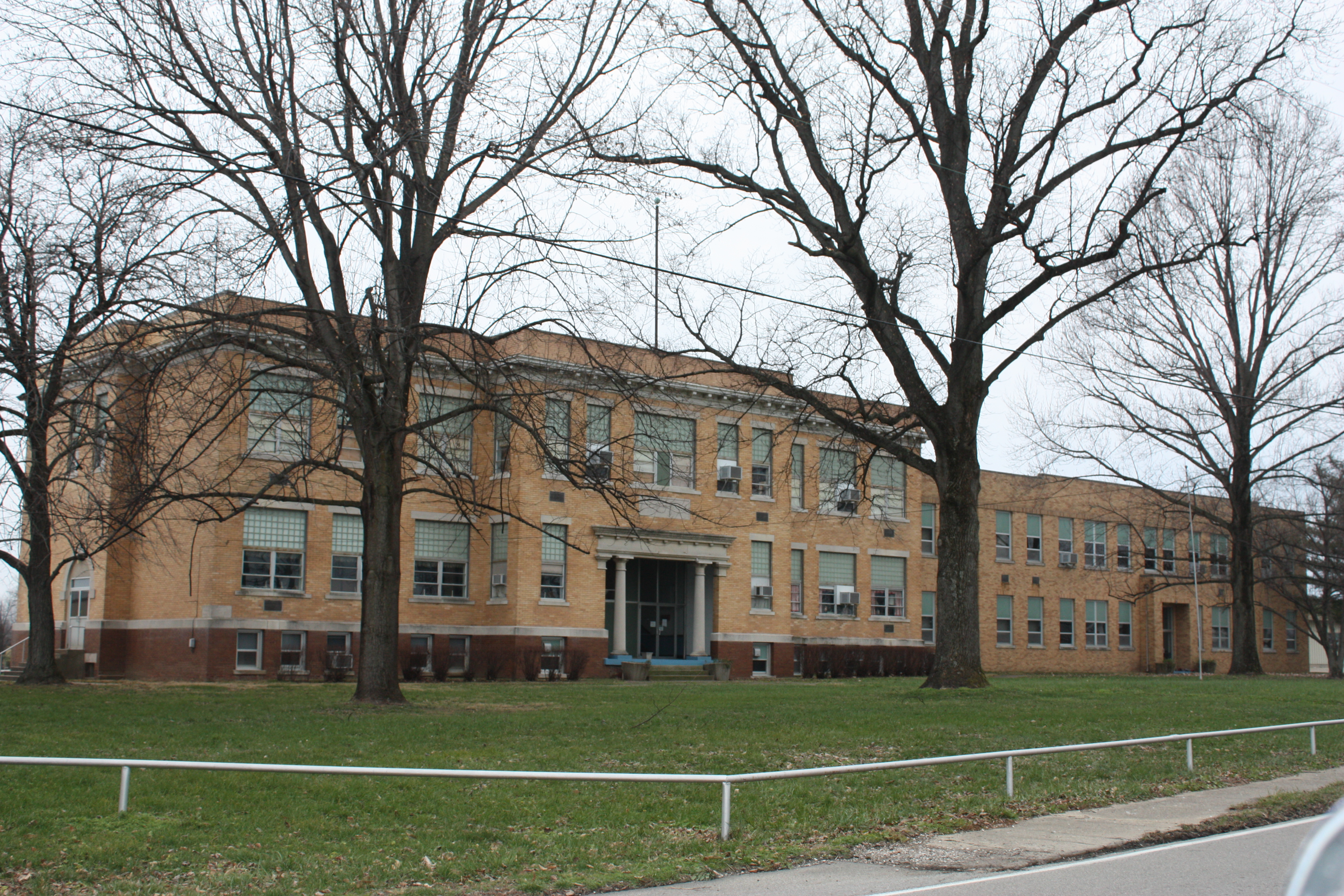
- Monroe City High School, now the Blue Jeans Community Center, Main Street, Monroe City.

- Location of Monroe City in Knox County, Indiana.
- Coordinates: 38°36′57″N 87°21′19″W
- Country: United States
- State: Indiana
- County: Knox
- Township: Harrison
- Established: August 29, 1856
- Named for: Monroe Alton

Area
  - Total: 0.27 sq mi (0.70 km^{2})
  - Land: 0.27 sq mi (0.70 km^{2})
  - Water: 0 sq mi (0.00 km^{2})
- Elevation: 525 ft (160 m)

Population (2020)
  - Total: 502
  - Density: 1,864.3/sq mi (719.81/km^{2})
- Time zone: UTC-5 (EST)
  - Summer (DST): UTC-4 (EDT)
- ZIP code: 47557
- Area code: 812
- FIPS code: 18-50526
- GNIS feature ID: 2396772

Monroe City is a town in Harrison Township, Knox County, Indiana, United States. The population was 502 at the 2020 census.

Monroe City was named for one of its founders, Monroe Alton.

== Geography ==
According to the 2010 census, Monroe City has a total area of 0.27 square miles (0.70 km^{2}), all land.

== Demographics ==
Historical population
Census	Pop.	Note	%±
1880	401		—
1890	589		46.9%
1900	688		16.8%
1910	630		−8.4%
1920	530		−15.9%
1930	544		2.6%
1940	518		−4.8%
1950	453		−12.5%
1960	505		11.5%
1970	603		19.4%
1980	569		−5.6%
1990	538		−5.4%
2000	548		1.9%
2010	545		−0.5%
2020	502		−7.9%
U.S. Decennial Census

=== 2010 census ===
As of the census of 2010, there were 545 people, 217 households, and 153 families living in the town. The population density was 2,018.5 inhabitants per square mile (779.3/km^{2}). There were 238 housing units at an average density of 881.5 per square mile (340.3/km^{2}). The racial makeup of the town was 98.7% White, 0.6% African American, 0.2% Native American, and 0.6% from other races. Hispanic or Latino of any race were 0.7% of the population.

There were 217 households, of which 37.8% had children under the age of 18 living with them, 53.0% were married couples living together, 14.3% had a female householder with no husband present, 3.2% had a male householder with no wife present, and 29.5% were non-families. 29.0% of all households were made up of individuals, and 13.8% had someone living alone who was 65 years of age or older. The average household size was 2.51 and the average family size was 3.08.

The median age in the town was 32.8 years. 28.8% of residents were under the age of 18; 8.2% were between the ages of 18 and 24; 29% were from 25 to 44; 20.7% were from 45 to 64; and 13.2% were 65 years of age or older. The gender makeup of the town was 47.3% male and 52.7% female.

=== 2000 census ===
As of the census of 2000, there were 548 people, 231 households, and 157 families living in the town. The population density was 2,039.4 inhabitants per square mile (787.4/km^{2}). There were 259 housing units at an average density of 963.9 per square mile (372.2/km^{2}). The racial makeup of the town was 99.27% White, 0.18% African American, and 0.55% from two or more races. Hispanic or Latino of any race were 0.36% of the population.

There were 231 households, out of which 32.9% had children under the age of 18 living with them, 53.7% were married couples living together, 11.3% had a female householder with no husband present, and 32.0% were non-families. 31.2% of all households were made up of individuals, and 16.9% had someone living alone who was 65 years of age or older. The average household size was 2.36 and the average family size was 2.94.

In the town, the population was spread out, with 24.6% under the age of 18, 8.4% from 18 to 24, 26.8% from 25 to 44, 22.6% from 45 to 64, and 17.5% who were 65 years of age or older. The median age was 39 years. For every 100 females, there were 93.6 males. For every 100 females age 18 and over, there were 90.3 males.

The median income for a household in the town was $32,788, and the median income for a family was $43,125. Males had a median income of $31,364 versus $18,269 for females. The per capita income for the town was $15,579. About 7.2% of families and 7.1% of the population were below the poverty line, including 9.0% of those under age 18 and 2.0% of those age 65 or over.

== Education ==
It is in the South Knox School Corporation.
