= Lockhart Township, Pike County, Indiana =

Lockhart Township Pike County
- Township
- Location in Pike County
- Coordinates: 38°16′41″N 87°08′08″W
- Country: United States
- State: Indiana
- County: Pike

Government
  - Type: Indiana township

Area
  - Total: 48.93 sq mi (126.7 km^{2})
  - Land: 48.02 sq mi (124.4 km^{2})
  - Water: 0.91 sq mi (2.4 km^{2}) 1.86%
- Elevation: 509 ft (155 m)

Population (2020)
  - Total: 856
  - Density: 17.8/sq mi (6.88/km^{2})
- ZIP codes: 47541, 47584, 47585, 47590, 47598
- GNIS feature ID: 453577

Lockhart Township is one of nine townships in Pike County, Indiana, United States. As of the 2020 census, its population was 856 and it contained 402 housing units.

Historical population
Census	Pop.	Note	%±
1890	2,220		—
1900	2,144		−3.4%
1910	1,879		−12.4%
1920	1,567		−16.6%
1930	1,054		−32.7%
1940	1,170		11.0%
1950	806		−31.1%
1960	647		−19.7%
1970	632		−2.3%
1980	681		7.8%
1990	724		6.3%
2000	690		−4.7%
2010	907		31.4%
2020	856		−5.6%
Source: US Decennial Census

== History ==
Lockhart Township was organized in 1852.

== Geography ==
According to the 2010 census, the township has a total area of 48.93 square miles (126.7 km^{2}), of which 48.02 square miles (124.4 km^{2}) (or 98.14%) is land and 0.91 square miles (2.4 km^{2}) (or 1.86%) is water.

=== Unincorporated towns ===
- Augusta at 38.331439°N 87.19084°W
- Fritz Corner at 38.297551°N 87.158894°W
- Hartwell at 38.322550°N 87.179728°W
- Pikeville at 38.321996°N 87.111392°W
- Stendal at 38.266718°N 87.144448°W

(This list is based on USGS data and may include former settlements.)

=== Cemeteries ===
The township contains these cemeteries: Barrett also known as Bethel Cemetery, Augusta IOOF also known as Odd Fellows, which is located southeast of the town of Augusta, Cup Creek which is located southwest of Pikeville and is also known as Pikeville Cemetery, Indian Mound Graveyard near Stendal, Log Creek also known as South Fork Cemetery southwest of Stendal, Miller which is northwest of Pikeville, Old Augusta Methodist Church Cemetery (church gone) which is located in the middle of the town of Augusta and is now obsolete, Pikeville Church of Christ (obsolete), Pikeville German Lutheran also known as the Primitive Baptist (obsolete cemetery with many unmarked graves), Russell which is southwest of Pikeville, Stendal St. Paul's Evangelical Lutheran Church on the north edge of the town of Stendal, Stendal St. Peter's Lutheran located in the town of Stendal, Zion's Hill located one mile south of Pikevill, also known as Zion's Hill Assembly of God, Zoar located four miles east of Stendal, and Stillwell located half-mile east of Pikeville.

=== Major highways ===
- SR 64

== School districts ==
- Pike County School Corporation

== Political districts ==
- State House District 63
- State Senate District 48
