= Harrison Township, Knox County, Indiana =

Harrison Township
- Township
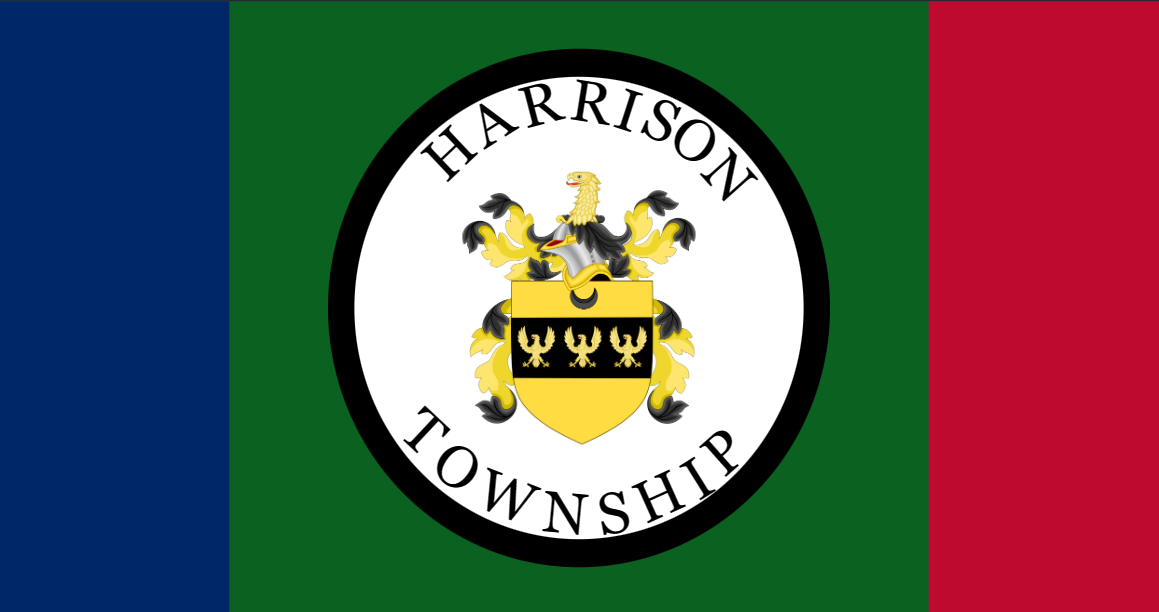
- Flag

- Coordinates: 38°35′21″N 87°21′10″W
- Country: United States
- State: Indiana
- County: Knox

Government
  - Type: Indiana township

Area
  - Total: 80.36 sq mi (208.1 km^{2})
  - Land: 79.11 sq mi (204.9 km^{2})
  - Water: 1.25 sq mi (3.2 km^{2})
- Elevation: 460 ft (140 m)

Population (2020)
  - Total: 1,921
  - Density: 24.28/sq mi (9.376/km^{2})
- FIPS code: 18-31864
- GNIS feature ID: 453390

Harrison Township is one of ten townships in Knox County, Indiana. As of the 2020 census, its population was 1,921 (slightly up from 1,916 at 2010) and it contained 867 housing units.

Historical population
Census	Pop.	Note	%±
1890	3,244		—
1900	3,601		11.0%
1910	3,224		−10.5%
1920	2,610		−19.0%
1930	2,321		−11.1%
1940	2,308		−0.6%
1950	1,976		−14.4%
1960	1,929		−2.4%
1970	1,839		−4.7%
1980	1,872		1.8%
1990	1,911		2.1%
2000	1,966		2.9%
2010	1,916		−2.5%
2020	1,921		0.3%
Source: US Decennial Census

== History ==
Harrison Township was founded in 1801. It was named for General William Henry Harrison, an American military officer and ninth President of the United States.

== Geography ==
According to the 2010 census, the township has a total area of 80.36 square miles (208.1 km^{2}), of which 79.11 square miles (204.9 km^{2}) (or 98.44%) is land and 1.25 square miles (3.2 km^{2}) (or 1.56%) is water.
