= North Knox Junior-Senior High School =

Location
- 10890 North SR 159; Bicknell address, Knox County, Indiana; United States; 38.835110°N 87.313587°W

Information
- Type: Public high school
- Established: 1963
- School district: North Knox School Corporation
- Principal: Scott Sturgeon
- Faculty: 35.00 (FTE)
- Grades: 7–12
- Enrollment: 541 (2024-2025)
- Student to teacher ratio: 15.46
- Color
- Athletics conference: Blue Chip Conference; Southwest Seven Football Conference
- Team name: Warriors
- Rivals: Vincennes Lincoln, South Knox, Washington, Linton-Stockton
- Gym Capacity: 4,000
- Website: nknox.k12.in.us/nkjshs

North Knox Junior-Senior High School (NKJSHS) is a public school located in Widner Township, Knox County, Indiana, United States, between the communities of Bicknell and Freelandville. It is a part of the North Knox School Corporation.

The district includes the municipalities of Bicknell, Bruceville, Edwardsport, Oaktown, and Sandborn, and the census-designated places of Emison, Freelandville, Ragsdale, and Westphalia.

== About ==
The original (1963–64) location of the North Knox High School was in the old Edwardsport school building. This Edwardsport building served as North Knox High School until the current structure on Indiana State Road 159 was opened in school year 1974–75. At this time, the original high school building at Edwardsport became North Knox East for grades 1–8. New structures were also opened in Bicknell and near Bruceville housing North Knox Central and North Knox West, grades 1–6. The current school building was based on the "open study" concept that was popular during the school's planning stages of the late 1960s. The school is all one level.

The school corporation is made up of the following towns in Northern Knox County: Bruceville, Bicknell/Ragsdale, Oaktown/Emison/Busseron, Edwardsport, Freelandville, Sandborn/Westphalia.

The school currently has 624 students enrolled with 48 faculty members.

== Athletics ==
The North Knox High School mascot name is "Warriors". The original school colors were black and white, with red being added a few years later.

In 2006-2007 the football field went under renovation adding a two-story press box and a new team barn with "North Knox" on the top of the building and a Warrior head emblem on the front. The high school received new lockers in 2008. In 2004, the pool was filled in to create an auxiliary gym after swimming was taken out of the curriculum. The auxiliary gym now houses many activities.

== Notable athletic alumni ==
- Dan Beery (University of Tennessee at Chattanooga) - American competition rower, Olympic champion, world champion and world cup gold medalist.
- Nevin Ashley (Indiana State) - Currently the bullpen catcher for the Toronto Blue Jays, former New York Mets Catcher and former catcher for the Milwaukee Brewers.
- Tricia Cullop (Purdue University) - Women's basketball coach - University of Toledo

== See also ==
- List of high schools in Indiana
