= U.S. Route 150 in Indiana =

Section of U.S. highway in Indiana

U.S. Route 150
- US 150 highlighted in red

Route information
- Maintained by INDOT
- Length: 177.165 mi (285.119 km)
- Existed: October 1, 1926–present

Major junctions
- West end: US 150 west of Libertyville
- US 41 in Terre Haute; I-70 / US 40 in Terre Haute; US 50 in Vincennes; US 41 in Vincennes; I-69 east of Washington; US 231 in Loogootee; US 50 in Shoals; I-64 / SR 62 west of New Albany; I-265 / SR 62 in New Albany
- East end: I-64 / US 150 in New Albany

Location
- Country: United States
- State: Indiana
- Counties: Vermillion, Vigo, Sullivan, Knox, Daviess, Martin, Orange, Washington, Harrison, Floyd

Highway system
- United States Numbered Highway System; List; Special; Divided; Indiana State Highway System; Interstate; US; State; Scenic
← SR 149	→ SR 152

U.S. Route 150 (US 150) in Indiana is a 176.315-mile-long (283.751 km) east–west highway that travels from the Illinois state line east of Paris, Illinois to Louisville, Kentucky at the Kentucky state line. A section of US 150 from New Goshen to Vincennes travels north–south instead of east–west. US 150 travels concurrently with its parent route, US 50, from Vincennes to Shoals. Between West Terre Haute and Terre Haute, US 150 travels along part of the historic National Road. Also, from Vincennes to New Albany, the route is designated as part of Indiana's Historic Pathways, as it roughly parallels what was then part of the Buffalo Trace.

== Route description ==
=== Illinois state line to Vincennes ===
After crossing the Illinois state line, US 150 briefly travels along the Vermillion–Vigo county line. The roadway soon gradually curves south, serving Libertyville, Shirkieville, and New Goshen. As US 150 approaches Terre Haute, the route largely parallels US 41 east of the Wabash River as well as SR 63. Along the way, US 150 serves St. Mary-of-the-Woods and the college it serves, Ferguson Hill, and West Terre Haute. The route then travels eastward, serving Taylorville before crossing over the Wabash River. Along with crossing the river and entering Terre Haute, US 150 splits into a one-way pair, with eastbound traffic using Ohio Street and westbound traffic using Cherry Street.

In the city of Terre Haute, as the pair approaches downtown, as well as the Vigo County Courthouse and the Indiana State University, the route then turns south along US 41 (3rd Street), a two-way, divided roadway. As a concurrency, both US 41 and US 150 serve the CANDLES Holocaust Museum and Education Center, I-70/US 40, and the Terre Haute Action Track. Both routes also serve Southwood, Allendale, and Woodgate. Near the Terre Haute campus of the Ivy Tech Community College, both routes meet SR 641 at a trumpet interchange. Through the rest of Vigo County, the roadway serves Youngstown and Pimento. The road then serves several more towns in Sullivan County: Farmersburg, Standard, Shelburn, Sullivan, Paxton, and Carlisle (which serves the Wabash Valley Correctional Facility).

On their way to Vincennes, US 41 and US 150 bend slightly west, connecting Oaktown, Busseron, and Emison. As both routes approach the city limit of Vincennes, they come across SR 67 at a modified diamond interchange and then US 50 at a cloverleaf interchange. Drivers wanting to stay on US 41/US 150 would have to use a one-lane ramp, with southbound traffic using a loop ramp and northbound traffic using the outer ramp. US 41 and US 150 then travel concurrently with US 50 via an expressway bypass around Vincennes. However, this triplex concurrency is brief as both US 50 and US 150 soon turn eastward at a full Y interchange.

=== Vincennes to Kentucky state line ===
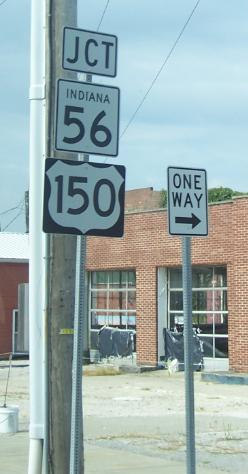
US 150 running concurrently with SR 56 in Paoli

After US 150 splits away from US 41, the route runs concurrently with just its parent route, US 50. As a four-lane divided highway, both routes serve Fritchton, Wheatland, and Maysville. Between Maysville and I-69, the roadway serves as a southern bypass of Washington. As a bypass, the concurrency serves South Washington at the intersection with SR 57. After the road serves I-69 at a diamond interchange, the roadway downgrades to a two-lane undivided highway. The routes then serve Black Oak, Montgomery, and Cannelburg. In Loogootee, both routes briefly run north concurrently with US 231. Between Loogootee and Shoals, the roadway parallels the East Fork White River. As the two routes enter Shoals, the concurrency splits, with US 50 traveling slightly northeastward and US 150 traveling slightly southeastward.

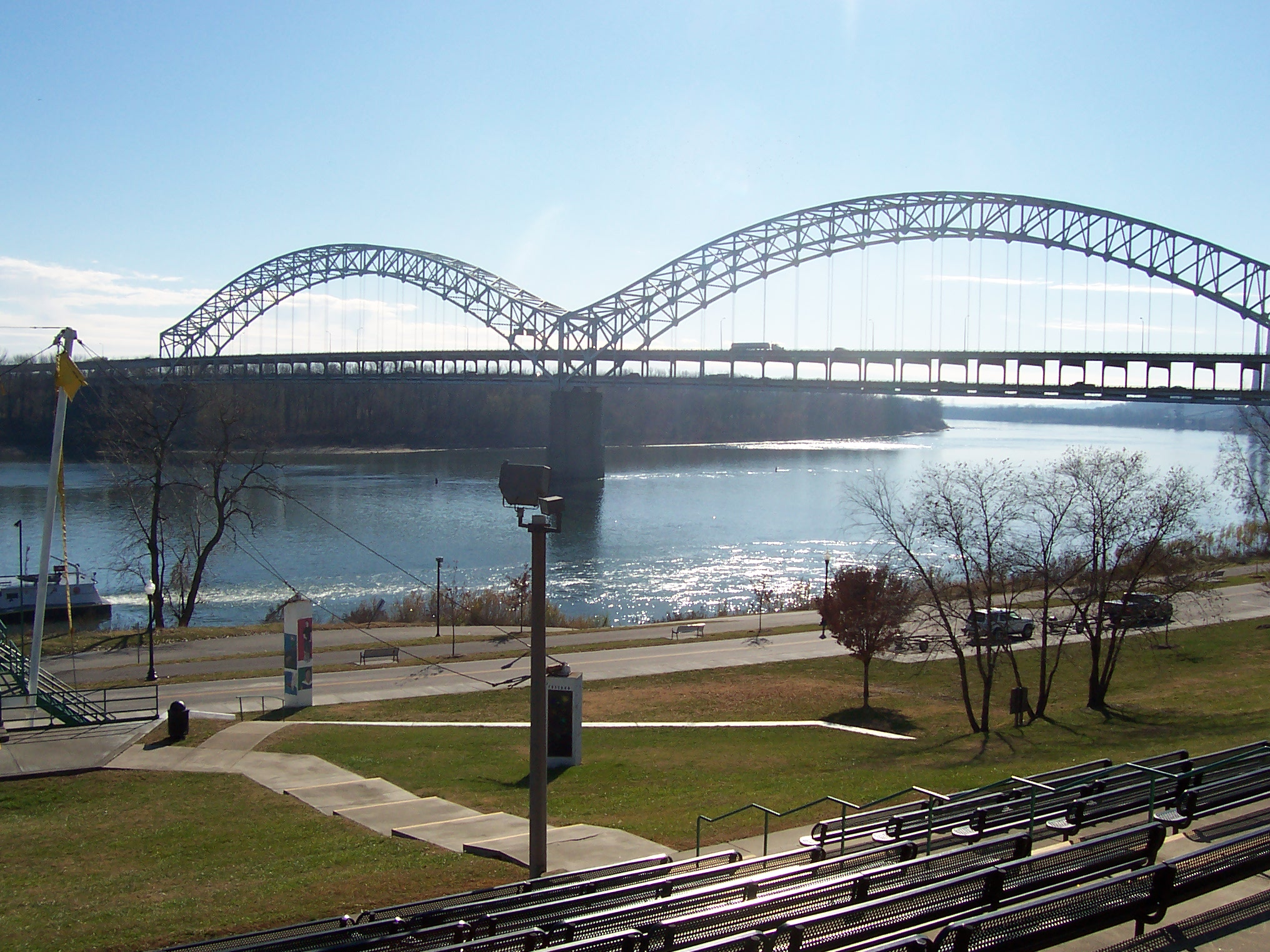
Sherman Minton Bridge above the Ohio River

Continuing onwards, US 150 alone serves several more towns: Lacy, Natchez, and Roland. In Prospect (located north of West Baden Springs and French Lick), SR 56 begins to run concurrently with US 150 all the way to Paoli. Also, in Paoli, SR 37 joins the concurrency for one block before departing at Courthouse Square (which surrounds Orange County Courthouse). After US 150 is alone once again, it then serves more towns: Chambersburg, Rego, Hardinsburg, Fredericksburg, Palmyra, Greenville, Galena, Mount St. Francis, and Floyds Knobs. As the route approaches New Albany, US 150 encounters I-64 at a trumpet interchange. After beginning to run concurrently with I-64 and SR 62, SR 62 then exits the concurrency onto I-265 (exit 121) at a directional T interchange. After serving downtown New Albany (exit 123), both I-64 and US 150 cross above the Ohio River via the Sherman Minton Bridge, crossing the Kentucky state line and into Louisville.

== History ==
Before 1926, a portion of SR 10 from Terre Haute to Vincennes and most of SR 5 from Vincennes to New Albany roughly traveled along the present-day routing of US 150. Then, in October 1926, lots of state roads in Indiana were supplanted by their U.S. Route counterpart. Among those, SR 5 was replaced by parts of US 50 and US 150. However, at that time, US 150 as a whole ran from Shoals to New Albany. Then, in 1934, US 150 was extended from both ends. The extension traveled southeast via the Kentucky & Indiana Bridge to enter Louisville, Kentucky, and beyond. Another extension traveled northwest via US 50, US 41, and SR 46 before entering Illinois. SR 46 was removed west of Terre Haute.

== Major intersections ==
County	Location	mi	km	Exit	Destinations	Notes
Vermillion–Vigo county line		0.000	0.000		US 150 west – Paris	Continuation into Illinois
Vigo	West Terre Haute	13.046	20.996		Historic National Road west (National Avenue) to I-70 west	Former US 40 west
Vigo	Terre Haute	14.854	23.905		US 41 north (3rd Street) / Historic National Road east (Wabash Avenue) to Ohio Street east / I-70 – Swope Art Museum	Western end of US 41 overlap; former US 40 east
Vigo	Terre Haute	17.183– 17.323	27.653– 27.879		I-70 / US 40 – Indianapolis, St. Louis	I-70 exit 7
Vigo		21.899	35.243		SR 641 north to I-70	
Vigo		28.482	45.837		SR 246	
Sullivan	Shelburn	34.67	55.80		SR 48 – Hymera, Jasonville	
Sullivan	Sullivan	40.795	65.653		SR 154 west / West Wolfe Street – Graysville, Sullivan	Eastern terminus of SR 154
Sullivan	Sullivan	42.953	69.126		SR 54 east – Dugger, Linton	Western terminus of SR 54
Sullivan	Carlisle	50.699	81.592		SR 58 – Merom, Carlisle	
Knox	Emison	62.522	100.619		SR 550 east – Bruceville, Wheatland	Western terminus of SR 550
Knox		69.051	111.127		SR 67 north – Bicknell	Southern terminus of SR 67; interchange
Knox	Vincennes	70.528	113.504		US 50 west to SR 61 (Sixth Street) – Lawrenceville	Western end of US 50 concurrency; cloverleaf interchange
Knox	Vincennes	71.71	115.41		US 41 south – Evansville	Eastern end of US 41 concurrency; full Y interchange
Knox	Wheatland	81.696	131.477		SR 550 west – Emison	Eastern terminus of SR 550
Knox	Wheatland	82.214	132.311		SR 241 south – Decker	Northern terminus of SR 241
Daviess	Washington	89.151	143.475		SR 57 – Evansville, Petersburg, Washington, Worthington	
Daviess	Washington	91.366	147.039		SR 257 – Otwell	
Daviess	Washington	93.12– 93.398	149.86– 150.310		I-69 – Evansville, Indianapolis	I-69 exit 62
Martin	Loogootee	104.649	168.416		US 231 south – Jasper	Southern end of US 231 concurrency
Martin	Loogootee	105.133	169.195		US 231 north – Bloomfield	Northern end of US 231 concurrency
Martin	Loogootee	105.416	169.651		SR 550 east	Western terminus of SR 550
Martin	Center Township	111.289	179.102		SR 450 east – Bedford	Western terminus of SR 450
Martin	Shoals	112.817	181.561		US 50 east – Bedford	Eastern end of US 50 overlap
Martin	Lacy	115.309	185.572		SR 550 west – Hindostan Falls	
Orange	Prospect	126.342	203.328		SR 56 west – West Baden Springs, French Lick	Western end of SR 56 overlap
Orange	Paoli	135.093	217.411		SR 37 south (Southwest 1st Street) – English, Tell City	Western end of SR 37 overlap
Orange	Paoli	135.144	217.493		SR 37 north (North Gospel Street)	Eastern end of SR 37 overlap; traffic circle around Orange County Courthouse
Orange	Paoli	135.436	217.963		SR 56 east (Northeast Main Street) – Salem	Eastern end of SR 56 overlap
Washington	Hardinsburg	149.044	239.863		SR 66 west – Milltown, Marengo	
Harrison	Palmyra	157.899	254.114		SR 135 (Greene Street) – Salem, Corydon	
Floyd	Greenville	164.065	264.037		SR 335 north – Martinsburg	
Floyd		172.923	278.293		I-64 west / SR 62 west – St. Louis	Western end of I-64/SR 62 overlap; US 150 west follows exit 119
Floyd		174.801	281.315	121	I-265 east / SR 62 east to I-65	Eastern end of SR 62 overlap; I-64 exit 121; I-265 exit 41; directional T interchange
Floyd	New Albany	176.208	283.579	123	New Albany	I-64 exit 123
Ohio River		177.165	285.119	Sherman Minton Bridge		
Ohio River		177.165	285.119		I-64 east / US 150 east – Louisville	Continuation into Kentucky
1.000 mi = 1.609 km; 1.000 km = 0.621 mi: Concurrency terminus

U.S. Route 150
Previous state: Illinois	Indiana	Next state: Kentucky
