= Freelandville, Indiana =

Freelandville
- Census-designated place
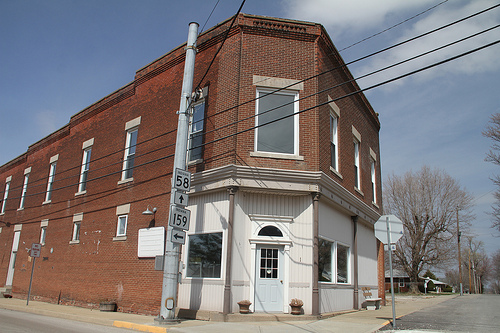
- Downtown Freelandville

- Location in Knox County, Indiana
- Coordinates: 38°51′53″N 87°18′21″W
- Country: United States
- State: Indiana
- County: Knox
- Township: Widner
- Named for: Dr. John T. Freeland

Area
  - Total: 5.56 sq mi (14.41 km^{2})
  - Land: 5.56 sq mi (14.41 km^{2})
  - Water: 0 sq mi (0.00 km^{2})
- Elevation: 574 ft (175 m)

Population (2020)
  - Total: 617
  - Density: 110.9/sq mi (42.81/km^{2})
- Time zone: UTC-5 (EST)
  - Summer (DST): UTC-4 (EDT)
- ZIP code: 47535
- Area code: 812
- FIPS code: 18-25810
- GNIS feature ID: 434813

Freelandville is an unincorporated community and census-designated place in Widner Township, Knox County, Indiana, United States. As of the 2020 census, Freelandville had a population of 617.

== Geography ==
Freelandville is in northeastern Knox County, located around the intersection of State Roads 58 and 159. It is 5 miles (8 km) west of Westphalia, 6 miles (10 km) north of Bicknell, and 20 miles (32 km) northeast of Vincennes, the county seat.

According to the United States Census Bureau, the Freelandville CDP has an area of 5.5 square miles (14.2 km^{2}), all of it land.

=== Climate ===
Climate data for Freelandville, Indiana (1991–2020)
Month	Jan	Feb	Mar	Apr	May	Jun	Jul	Aug	Sep	Oct	Nov	Dec	Year
Mean daily maximum °F (°C)	37.2 (2.9)	41.9 (5.5)	52.7 (11.5)	64.7 (18.2)	74.4 (23.6)	82.9 (28.3)	85.7 (29.8)	84.9 (29.4)	79.0 (26.1)	67.2 (19.6)	53.2 (11.8)	41.7 (5.4)	63.8 (17.7)
Daily mean °F (°C)	29.8 (−1.2)	33.5 (0.8)	43.1 (6.2)	54.3 (12.4)	64.6 (18.1)	73.3 (22.9)	76.2 (24.6)	74.7 (23.7)	68.1 (20.1)	56.4 (13.6)	44.3 (6.8)	34.4 (1.3)	54.4 (12.4)
Mean daily minimum °F (°C)	22.4 (−5.3)	25.0 (−3.9)	33.6 (0.9)	43.9 (6.6)	54.8 (12.7)	63.7 (17.6)	66.7 (19.3)	64.6 (18.1)	57.2 (14.0)	45.6 (7.6)	35.4 (1.9)	27.1 (−2.7)	45.0 (7.2)
Average precipitation inches (mm)	3.22 (82)	2.46 (62)	3.36 (85)	4.73 (120)	5.45 (138)	4.44 (113)	4.15 (105)	3.46 (88)	3.44 (87)	3.64 (92)	3.93 (100)	3.14 (80)	45.42 (1,152)
Average snowfall inches (cm)	4.6 (12)	3.6 (9.1)	1.4 (3.6)	0.0 (0.0)	0.0 (0.0)	0.0 (0.0)	0.0 (0.0)	0.0 (0.0)	0.0 (0.0)	0.2 (0.51)	0.2 (0.51)	5.1 (13)	15.1 (38.72)
Source: NOAA

== Demographics ==
As of 2018, Freelandville's population was estimated to be 890. 98.5% of residents were white and 1.5% were two or more races.

Historical population
Census	Pop.	Note	%±
2020	617		—
US Decennial Census

== History ==
The first settler of the area was John Widner, who came to Knox County in 1798 and in 1804 settled on land two and a half miles northwest of Freelandville. William Polk, uncle of James Polk, settled on land about two miles from Widner in 1808. In 1812, Fort Widner was built as protection against the Native Americans during the second war with Great Britain.

Although the area was initially settled by the English, cheap available government land and the aspect of work on the Wabash & Erie Canal brought other immigrants to the area. Freelandville was settled mostly by immigrants from Germany, many from the kingdom of Prussia, in the mid-1800s. The German settlers originally referred to the place as "Bethlehem" or "Kreuzweg", meaning "crossroads". The town was not officially laid out until July 31, 1866, when done so by John Ritterskamp. Residents chose to name the town "Freelandsville" to honor John F. Freeland, a prominent local physician. Maps from that period refer to the area as Freelandsville, and some local sources still refer to the area with this name. It is not clear when the shorter spelling became predominant.

Kixmiller's Store, on the north side of the intersection of Highways 58 and 159, was added to the National Register of Historic Places in 1978. The building was partially demolished on 20 February 2017 after its structure had significantly deteriorated.

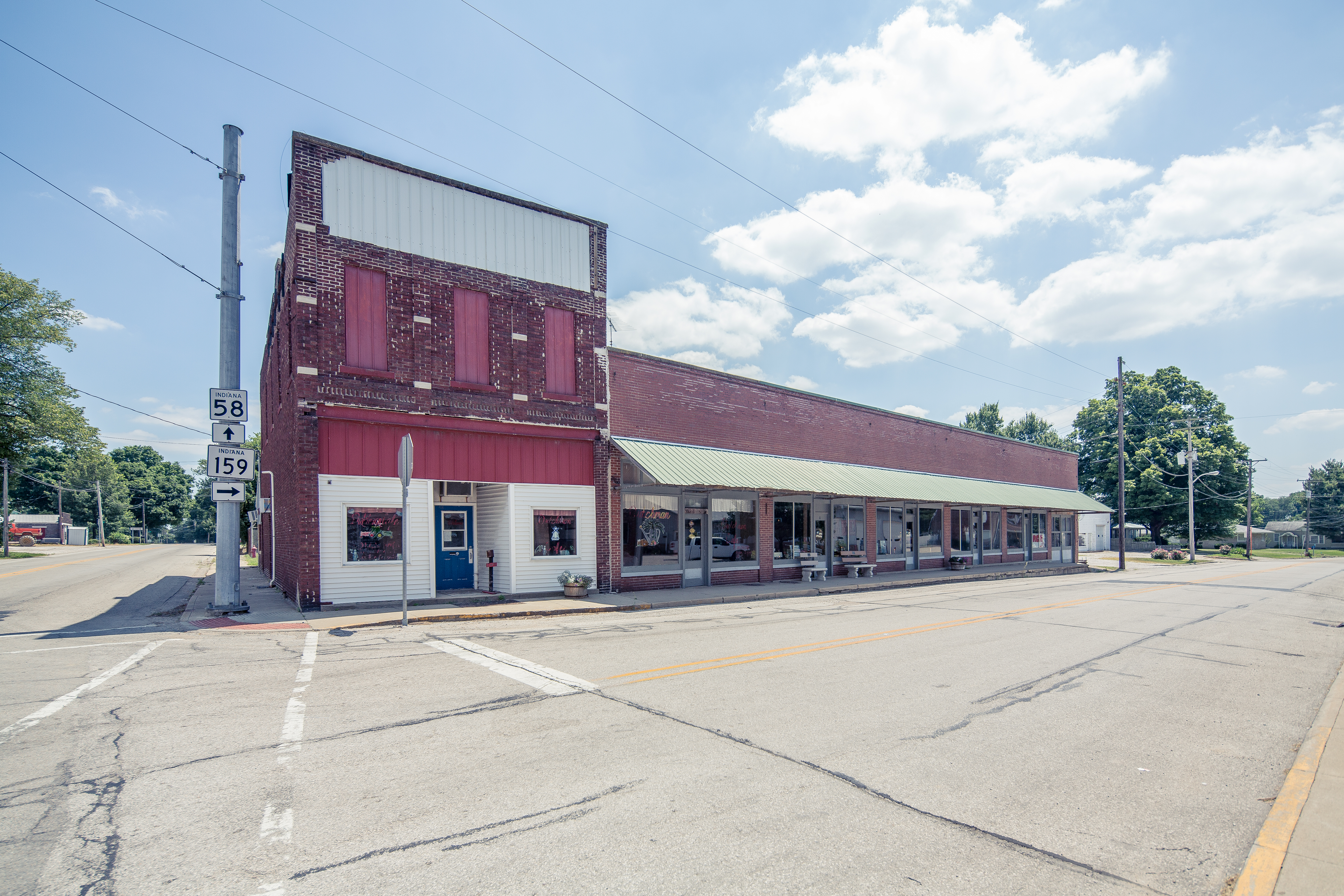
Cafe and Electronics Building (Photo from Small Town Indiana photo survey)

== Freelandville School ==
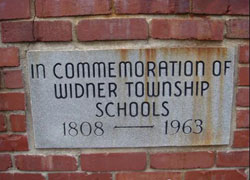
Stone marker at the location of the Freelandville School

The first school taught in the area was in 1808, at the home of John Widner. The first school building in Freelandville was built around 1850, before the town was laid out. Due to the rapidly expanding population, a second two-story building was built in 1874.

In 1963, the area high schools were consolidated into the North Knox School Corporation. This consolidated all local schools into a central location in Edwardsport. This included the high schools of Bicknell, Freelandville, Bruceville, Oaktown, Edwardsport, Sandborn, Westphalia, and Emison. The grade schools remained at their locations, with the exception of Edwardsport, whose students were transferred to Freelandville.

The local grade schools remained until 1973, when a new high school building was opened. The old high school building and new structures in Bicknell and Bruceville became elementary schools.

The Freelandville School teams were known as the "Fightin' Dutch", and the school colors were blue and white.

== Happy Street ==
When Freelandville was originally surveyed by John Ritterskamp, he named one street "Henry Street" after a member of his family, as he did many of the streets. Eventually the residents started referring to it as "Happy Street" due to the friendly people and children living there. It is unknown as to when the nickname started, but it is believed to have been called "Happy Street" since at least the 1930s.

In the early 1980s, the Freelandville Improvement Club decided to put street signs up in town, as they had not had them before then. Oddly enough, there is no current street sign for Happy Street, as anytime one was put up, it was stolen.

The residents of Henry Street successfully petitioned to have the name changed to "Happy Street". It runs for one block, until it crosses State Road 159, where the name reverts to Henry Street.
