= Indiana State Road 550 =

State highway in Indiana, United States

State Road 550
- SR 550 highlighted in red

Route information
- Maintained by INDOT
- Length: 23.651 mi (38.063 km)

Western segment
- Length: 13.872 mi (22.325 km)
- West end: US 41 / US 150 in Emison
- Major intersections: SR 67 in Bruceville
- East end: US 50 / US 150 in Wheatland

Eastern Segment
- Length: 9.779 mi (15.738 km)
- West end: US 50 / US 150 in Loogootee
- East end: US 150 in Lacy

Location
- Country: United States
- State: Indiana
- Counties: Knox, Martin

Highway system
- Indiana State Highway System; Interstate; US; State; Scenic
← SR 545	→ SR 558

State Road 550 exists in two portions. The western section is completely within Knox County and has a western terminus east of Emison at U.S. Route 41/U.S. Route 150 and runs southeasterly to the U.S. Route 50/US 150 concurrency in Wheatland. The eastern section terminates at both ends at US 150 in Martin County between Loogootee and Lacy.

== Route description ==
=== Western segment ===
The western segment of SR 550 begins at an intersection with US 41/US 150. SR 550 heads southeast towards Wheatland passing through an intersection with State Road 67 in Bruceville. SR 550 enters Wheatland on the northwest side of town and heads towards its eastern terminus of this section at an intersection with US 50/US 150

=== Eastern segment ===
The eastern section of SR 550 begins in Loogootee, east of the US 50/US 150/U.S. Route 231 intersection. SR 550 heads southeast then turning east. The eastern terminus of SR 550 is at an intersection with US 150.

== Major intersections ==
County	Location	mi	km	Destinations	Notes
Knox	Emison	0.000	0.000	US 41 / US 150 – Vincennes, Sullivan	Western terminus of SR 550
Knox	Bruceville	4.344	6.991	SR 67 – Vincennes, Bicknell	
Knox	Wheatland	13.872	22.325	US 50 / US 150 – Vincennes, Washington	Eastern terminus of the western section of SR 550
Gap in route
Martin	Loogootee	13.873	22.326	US 50 / US 150	Western terminus of the eastern section of SR 550
Martin	Lacy	23.651	38.063	US 150	Eastern terminus of SR 550
1.000 mi = 1.609 km; 1.000 km = 0.621 mi
