= Westphalia, Indiana =

- Census-designated place
- Location in Knox County, Indiana

- Location within Indiana Location within the United States
- Coordinates: 38°51′46″N 87°13′32″W
- Country: United States
- State: Indiana
- County: Knox
- Township: Vigo
- Established: December, 1881
- Named after: Westphalia

Area
  - Total: 2.06 sq mi (5.34 km^{2})
  - Land: 2.06 sq mi (5.34 km^{2})
  - Water: 0 sq mi (0.00 km^{2})
- Elevation: 466 ft (142 m)

Population (2020)
  - Total: 181
  - Density: 87.8/sq mi (33.89/km^{2})
- Time zone: UTC-5 (EST)
  - Summer (DST): UTC-4 (EDT)
- ZIP code: 47596
- FIPS code: 18-83204
- GNIS feature ID: 445855

Westphalia is an unincorporated community and census-designated place (CDP) in Vigo Township, Knox County, Indiana. As of the 2020 census, Westphalia had a population of 181.

== History ==
Westphalia was laid out in 1881, and it was originally built up chiefly by Germans. It was named after the region of Westphalia in Germany. The Westphalia post office was established in 1881. Many businesses have existed over the history of Westphalia including a variety store, antique store, hotel, blacksmith, elevator, photo studio, mine supply and the Westphalia elementary school.

== Geography ==
Westphalia is located in northeastern Knox County at 38°51′46″N 87°13′32″W. Indiana State Road 67 passes through the center of the community, leading northeast 3 miles (5 km) to Sandborn and southwest 4 miles (6 km) to Edwardsport and 23 miles (37 km) to Vincennes, the Knox county seat. Indiana State Road 58 joins SR 67 northeast out of Westphalia but leads west 5 miles (8 km) to Freelandville.

According to the U.S. Census Bureau, the Westphalia CDP has an area of 2.06 square miles (5.34 km^{2}), all of it land.

== Demographics ==
Historical population
Census	Pop.	Note	%±
2020	181		—
U.S. Decennial Census

== Education ==
It is in the North Knox School Corporation.

== Places of interest ==
Westphalia has a playground, a church (Salem United Church of Christ), low income senior apartments and a post office. Westphalia is a rural community.
