= Loogootee, Indiana =

- City
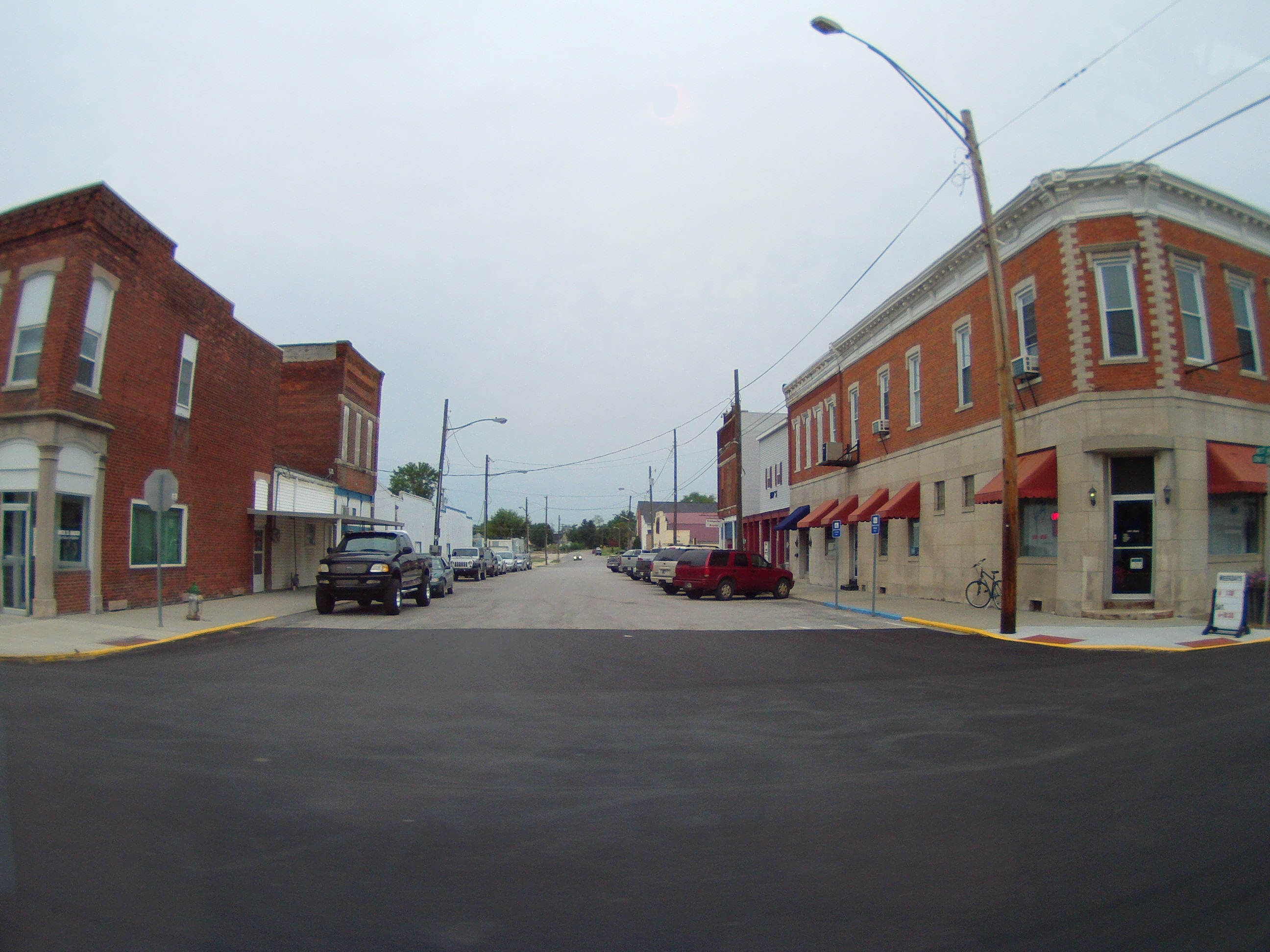
- Looking down West Main Street from U.S. 231

- Location in Martin County, Indiana
- Coordinates: 38°40′32″N 86°54′51″W
- Country: United States
- State: Indiana
- County: Martin
- Township: Perry

Government
  - Mayor: Brian T. Ader (R)

Area
  - Total: 1.57 sq mi (4.06 km^{2})
  - Land: 1.56 sq mi (4.05 km^{2})
  - Water: 0.0039 sq mi (0.01 km^{2}) 0%
- Elevation: 532 ft (162 m)

Population (2020)
  - Total: 2,601
  - Density: 1,662.1/sq mi (641.74/km^{2})
- Time zone: UTC-5 (Eastern (EST))
  - Summer (DST): UTC-4 (EDT)
- ZIP code: 47553
- Area codes: 812 and 930
- FIPS code: 18-44910
- GNIS feature ID: 2395763
- Website: loogootee.in.gov

Loogootee (/ləˈɡoʊtiː/) is a city in Perry Township, Martin County, in the U.S. state of Indiana. The population was 2,601 at the time of the 2020 census.

== History ==
Loogootee was established in 1853, when it was certain that a new railroad line would be extended to that point. The post office at Loogootee has been in operation since 1857. Reader's Digest considers the name to be the hardest to pronounce in the state of Indiana.

In 2023, the city held its first pride parade.

== Etymology ==
"Several etymologies of the place name have been proposed. One would make it an Anglicization of the French name Le Gaultier. However, the most likely explanation is that Loogootee is a compound word honoring both Thomas Lowe, engineer of the first train through the town; and Thomas Nesbe Gootee (1797–1870), owner of the land where the town was built."

== Geography ==
Loogootee is located on the western side of Martin County and the western border of the city is the Daviess County line.

Several U.S. highways pass through the center of Loogootee. U.S. Routes 50 and 150 follow Broadway through the city, while U.S. Route 231 enters from the north on John F. Kennedy Avenue, joins Routes 50 and 150 on Broadway south of the city center, then turns south on its own alignment. US 50 and 150 lead east 7 miles (11 km) to Shoals, the Martin county seat, and west 15 miles (24 km) to Washington, while US 231 leads north 24 miles (39 km) to Bloomfield and south 21 miles (34 km) to Jasper. Indiana State Road 550 leads southeast from Loogootee 10 miles (16 km) to Lacy.

According to the U.S. Census Bureau, Loogootee has a total area of 1.57 square miles (4.07 km^{2}), of which 0.004 square miles (0.01 km^{2}), or 0.25%, are water. The city drains northeast toward Boggs Creek and southwest toward Friends Creek, both of which are southeast-flowing tributaries of the East Fork of the White River, part of the Wabash River watershed.

The city is located in the 8th District of Indiana (map) and served by U.S. Representative Larry Bucshon.

=== Climate ===
Loogootee has a humid continental climate (Köppen climate classification Dfa) Summers are hot and humid, winters are cool to cold. Average temperatures range from 19 degrees Fahrenheit to 68 °F (20 °C). On average, the warmest month is July. The highest recorded temperature was 104 °F (40 °C) in 1954. The average coolest month is January. The lowest recorded temperature was −23 °F (−31 °C) in 1994. The maximum average precipitation occurs in May.

Climate data for Loogootee, Indiana
Month	Jan	Feb	Mar	Apr	May	Jun	Jul	Aug	Sep	Oct	Nov	Dec	Year
Record high °F (°C)	72 (22)	77 (25)	83 (28)	90 (32)	98 (37)	102 (39)	104 (40)	100 (38)	103 (39)	92 (33)	83 (28)	77 (25)	104 (40)
Mean daily maximum °F (°C)	38 (3)	44 (7)	54 (12)	66 (19)	75 (24)	83 (28)	86 (30)	86 (30)	80 (27)	68 (20)	55 (13)	42 (6)	65 (18)
Mean daily minimum °F (°C)	19 (−7)	22 (−6)	30 (−1)	40 (4)	50 (10)	59 (15)	63 (17)	61 (16)	53 (12)	41 (5)	33 (1)	23 (−5)	41 (5)
Record low °F (°C)	−23 (−31)	−18 (−28)	−9 (−23)	14 (−10)	27 (−3)	37 (3)	46 (8)	42 (6)	32 (0)	16 (−9)	0 (−18)	−20 (−29)	−23 (−31)
Average precipitation inches (mm)	3.16 (80)	2.92 (74)	4.27 (108)	4.49 (114)	5.60 (142)	4.24 (108)	4.74 (120)	3.78 (96)	3.36 (85)	3.13 (80)	4.47 (114)	3.53 (90)	47.69 (1,211)
Source: The Weather Channel.

== Demographics ==
Historical population
Census	Pop.	Note	%±
1870	748		—
1880	885		18.3%
1890	988		11.6%
1900	1,382		39.9%
1910	2,154		55.9%
1920	2,385		10.7%
1930	2,203		−7.6%
1940	2,325		5.5%
1950	2,424		4.3%
1960	2,858		17.9%
1970	2,953		3.3%
1980	3,100		5.0%
1990	2,884		−7.0%
2000	2,741		−5.0%
2010	2,751		0.4%
2020	2,601		−5.5%
U.S. Decennial Census

=== 2020 census ===
As of the 2020 census, Loogootee had a population of 2,601. The median age was 41.4 years. 22.2% of residents were under the age of 18 and 20.2% of residents were 65 years of age or older. For every 100 females, there were 94.8 males, and for every 100 females age 18 and over, there were 91.8 males age 18 and over.

0.0% of residents lived in urban areas, while 100.0% lived in rural areas.

There were 1,196 households in Loogootee, of which 24.9% had children under the age of 18 living in them. Of all households, 35.7% were married-couple households, 22.4% were households with a male householder and no spouse or partner present, and 33.9% were households with a female householder and no spouse or partner present. About 39.9% of all households were made up of individuals and 17.7% had someone living alone who was 65 years of age or older.

There were 1,295 housing units, of which 7.6% were vacant. The homeowner vacancy rate was 1.2% and the rental vacancy rate was 6.4%.

Racial composition as of the 2020 census
Race	Number	Percent
White	2,480	95.3%
Black or African American	5	0.2%
American Indian and Alaska Native	6	0.2%
Asian	12	0.5%
Native Hawaiian and Other Pacific Islander	1	0.0%
Some other race	0	0.0%
Two or more races	97	3.7%
Hispanic or Latino (of any race)	5	0.2%

=== 2010 census ===
As of the census of 2010, there were 2,751 people, 1,206 households, and 709 families residing in the city. The population density was 1,752.2 inhabitants per square mile (676.5/km^{2}). There were 1,324 housing units at an average density of 843.3 per square mile (325.6/km^{2}). The racial makeup of the city was 98.3% White, 0.1% African American, 0.2% Native American, 0.3% Asian, 0.6% from other races, and 0.5% from two or more races. Hispanic or Latino of any race were 0.8% of the population.

There were 1,206 households of which 28.6% had children under the age of 18 living with them, 42.4% were married couples living together, 11.9% had a female householder with no husband present, 4.6% had a male householder with no wife present, and 41.2% were non-families. 37.1% of all households were made up of individuals and 14.7% had someone living alone who was 65 years of age or older. The average household size was 2.25 and the average family size was 2.95.

The median age in the city was 40.4 years. 23.4% of residents were under the age of 18; 8.1% were between the ages of 18 and 24; 23.4% were from 25 to 44; 28.1% were from 45 to 64; and 17.1% were 65 years of age or older. The gender makeup of the city was 47.7% male and 52.3% female.

=== 2000 census ===
As of the census of 2000, there were 2,741 people, 1,226 households, and 712 families living in the city. The population density was 1,750.5 inhabitants per square mile (675.9/km^{2}). There were 1,337 housing units at an average density of 853.8 per square mile (329.7/km^{2}). The racial makeup of the city was 99.05% White, 0.04% African American, 0.11% Native American, 0.33% Asian, 0.04% from other races, and 0.44% from two or more races. Hispanic or Latino of any race were 0.40% of the population.

There were 1,226 households, out of which 67.3% had children under the age of 18 living with them, 83.4% were married couples living together, 5.8% had a female householder with no husband present, and 11.9% were non-families. 10.0% of all households were made up of individuals, and 7.1% had someone living alone who was 65 years of age or older. The average household size was 3.20 and the average family size was 4.04.

In the city, the population was spread out, with 35.7% under the age of 18, 4.5% from 18 to 24, 22.6% from 25 to 44, 20.5% from 45 to 64, and 14.7% who were 65 years of age or older. The median age was 41 years. For every 100 females, there were 92.8 males. For every 100 females age 18 and over, there were 87.8 males.

The median income for a household in the city was $30,492, and the median income for a family was $37,625. Males had a median income of $30,660 versus $21,490 for females. The per capita income for the city was $17,321. About 13.1% of families and 16.4% of the population were below the poverty line, including 23.2% of those under age 18 and 10.7% of those age 65 or over.

== Education and sports ==
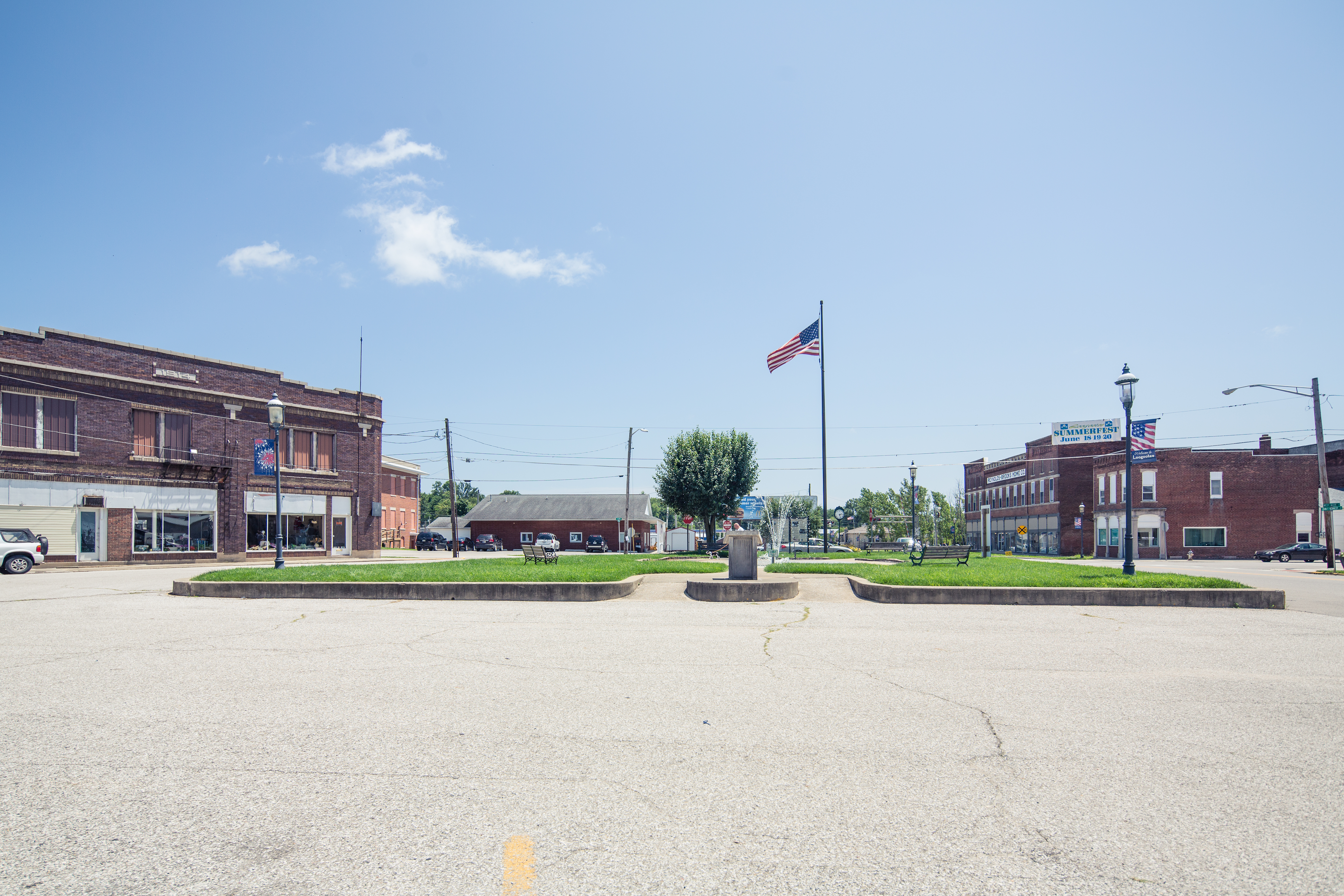
Downtown Loogootee

Loogootee has three schools in its district: Loogootee Elementary (PreK–4), Loogootee Middle School (5–8), and Loogootee High School (9–12). The mascot is a lion. The school colors are black and old gold. The school song is "Washington and Lee Swing". Loogootee has a long-standing, proud tradition of high school basketball. It is the home to high school basketball coach Jack Butcher, who had a career record of 806–250 (all at Loogootee High School). Butcher led Loogootee basketball to two state finals appearances under the single-class state tournament (1970, 1975). Loogootee High School's first state championship in any sport was for boys' basketball (2012 1A Champions). Loogootee boasts rivalries with area schools, North Daviess and Barr-Reeve. The Lions own the all-time series against both schools, and the rivalry with Barr-Reeve has recently been considered the state's best high school rivalry by several media outlets. The boys' basketball program has had an impressive winning record for many years. In the past fifty years, only three seasons have finished with below .500 records. The Loogootee High School girls' basketball team also owns a state title from the 2019–2020 season. Loogootee's boys' tennis program has also gained notoriety after winning twelve straight sectional titles under the guidance of Coach Rick Graves. Additionally, the girls' tennis program won seven consecutive sectional titles from 2004 to 2010 under coach Mike Tippery. The volleyball team was state runner-up for three consecutive years (2005–2007) and also in 2012 and 2020.

School	Type	Enrollment	Mascot	Colors	IHSAA Class	Athletic Conference
Loogootee High School	Public	314	Lions		A	Blue Chip Conference

The town has a lending library, the Loogootee Public Library. The library is part of the Evergreen Indiana Library Consortium and the eIndiana Digital Consortium, which allow members to obtain books and eBooks from any member library.

== Notable people ==
- Patrick Summers, conductor, Artistic and Music Director of the Houston Grand Opera
- Nathan Kimball, brevet major general in the Union Army during the American Civil War
- Ann Joseph Morris, nun and beekeeper
- L. Brooks Patterson, county executive of Oakland County, Michigan

== Economy ==
A large number of the residents of Loogootee are employed with the federal government and government contractors at Naval Surface Warfare Center Crane Division, 10 miles (16 km) north of town.

== Transportation ==
Loogootee is the point of intersection of two major US highways, U.S. Route 231 and U.S. Route 50

=== US Highways ===
- U.S. Route 231
- U.S. Route 50
- U.S. Route 150

=== Indiana State Roads (local references) ===
- State Road 550
