= Bruceville =

Bruceville can refer to a place in the United States:

- Bruceville, Indiana
- Bruceville-Eddy, Texas
