= Alfred Simonson House =

Historic house in Indiana, United States

- U.S. National Register of Historic Places
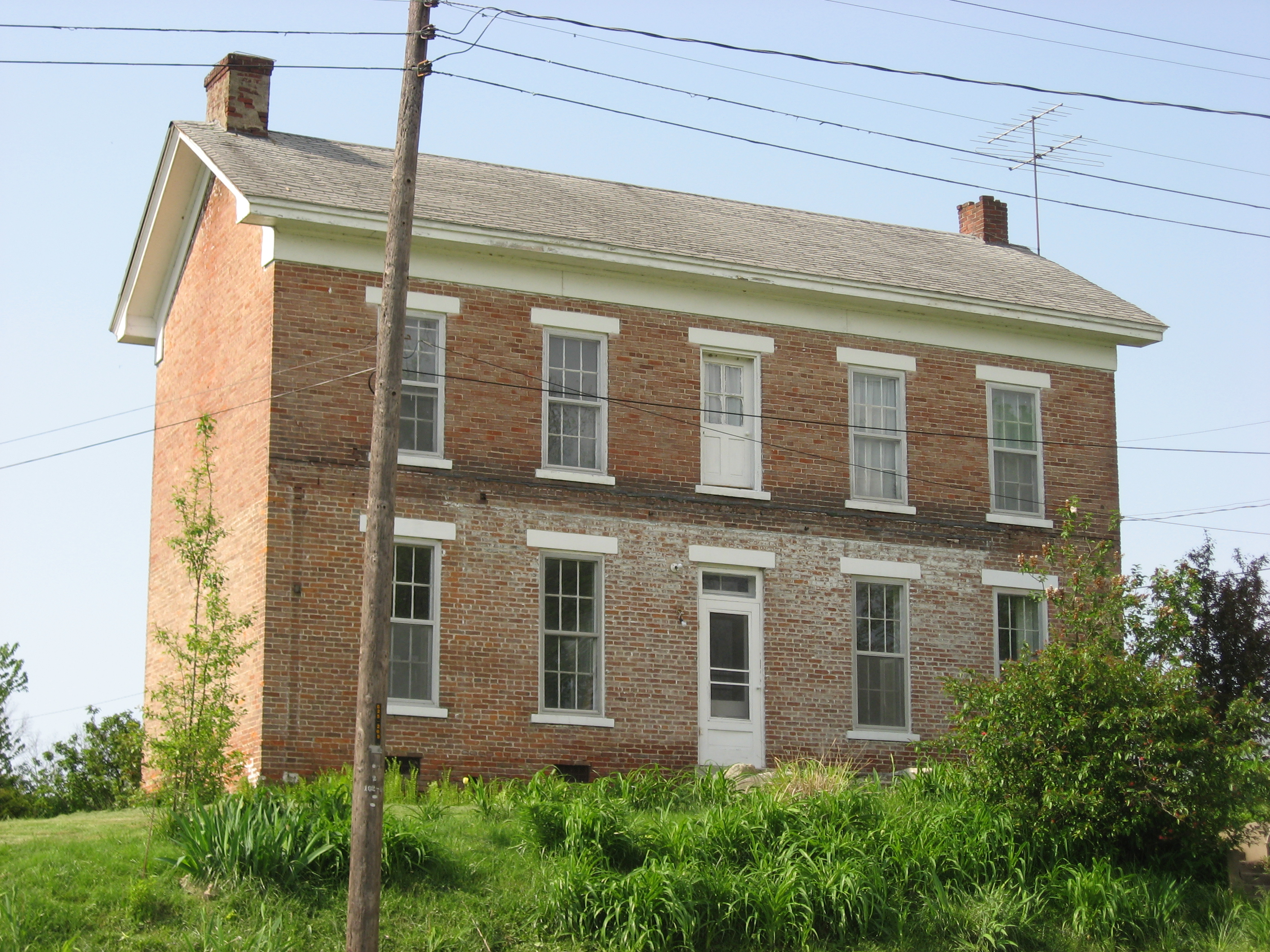
- Alfred Simonson House, April 2011

- Location within Indiana Location within the United States
- Location: 207 Shipping St., Edwardsport, Indiana
- Coordinates: 38°48′42″N 87°14′56″W
- Area: less than one acre
- Built: 1873
- Architectural style: Greek Revival, I-house
- NRHP reference No.: 09001131
- Added to NRHP: December 24, 2009

Alfred Simonson House is a historic home located at Edwardsport, Indiana. It was built in 1873, and is a two-story, five-bay, vernacular Greek Revival style brick I-house. A single story ell connects to a merchant shop or summer kitchen. It was the home of prominent merchant Alfred Simonson from its construction until his death in 1902.

It was added to the National Register of Historic Places in 2009.
