= Widner Township, Knox County, Indiana =

Widner Township
- Township
- Coordinates: 38°51′52″N 87°20′34″W
- Country: United States
- State: Indiana
- County: Knox
- Established: 1804
- Founder: John Widner

Government
  - Type: Indiana township

Area
  - Total: 41.24 sq mi (106.8 km^{2})
  - Land: 41.2 sq mi (107 km^{2})
  - Water: 0.04 sq mi (0.10 km^{2})
- Elevation: 443 ft (135 m)

Population (2020)
  - Total: 1,094
  - Density: 26.6/sq mi (10.3/km^{2})
- Time zone: UTC-5 (EST)
  - Summer (DST): UTC-4 (EDT)
- FIPS code: 18-84158
- GNIS feature ID: 454058

Widner Township is one of ten townships in Knox County, Indiana. As of the 2010 census, its population was 1,094 (down from 1,132 at 2010) and it contained 506 housing units. It contains the census-designated place of Freelandville.

Historical population
Census	Pop.	Note	%±
1890	1,820		—
1900	1,719		−5.5%
1910	1,767		2.8%
1920	1,745		−1.2%
1930	1,583		−9.3%
1940	1,611		1.8%
1950	1,540		−4.4%
1960	1,338		−13.1%
1970	1,278		−4.5%
1980	1,287		0.7%
1990	1,197		−7.0%
2000	1,165		−2.7%
2010	1,132		−2.8%
2020	1,094		−3.4%
Source: US Decennial Census

== History ==
Widner Township was named for John Widner, a pioneer settler.

Kixmiller's Store at Freedlandville was added to the National Register of Historic Places in 1978.

== Geography ==
According to the 2010 census, the township has a total area of 41.24 square miles (106.8 km^{2}), of which 41.2 square miles (107 km^{2}) (or 99.90%) is land and 0.04 square miles (0.10 km^{2}) (or 0.10%) is water.

== Education ==
It is in the North Knox School Corporation.
