= Beal, Indiana =

- Unincorporated community
- Location within Indiana Location within the United States
- Coordinates: 38°34′36″N 87°37′48″W
- Country: United States
- State: Indiana
- County: Knox
- Township: Vincennes
- Elevation: 407 ft (124 m)
- ZIP code: 47591
- FIPS code: 18-03772
- GNIS feature ID: 452269

Beal is an unincorporated community in Vincennes Township, Knox County, Indiana.

A post office was established at Beal in 1891, and remained in operation until it was discontinued in 1901.

== Geography ==
Beal is located at 38°34′36″N 87°37′48″W. As the crow flies, Beal is located ~0.45 miles (0.72 km) west of the Indiana–Illinois border along the Wabash River.
