= North Knox School Corporation =

School district in Indiana, United States

Location
- Knox County, Indiana United States

District information
- Type: Public
- Established: 1963
- Schools: 3 active schools

North Knox School Corporation (NKSC) is a school district in Knox County, Indiana. The district administration is in Widner Township, with a Bicknell postal address.North Knox School Corporation has 19 buses in the fleet.14 being built by Thomas Built Buses Inc. 6 being by IC, and 1 being by BlueBird.

It is made up of the following townships: Busseron, Vigo, Washington, and Widner. The district includes the municipalities of Bicknell, Bruceville, Edwardsport, Oaktown, and Sandborn, and the census-designated places of Emison, Freelandville, Ragsdale, and Westphalia.

== History ==
In 1961, there was a petition to try to create the school district.

The North Knox School Corp. came into existence in the 1963–64 school year, with the consolidation of all the smaller northern Knox County high schools to one central location. Those small-town high schools were located at Bicknell, Freelandville, Bruceville, Oaktown, Edwardsport, Sandborn, Westphalia and Emison. At that time, grades 1-8 remained at the smaller locations, with the exception of Edwardsport students, who were transferred to Freelandville School.

In 1966 the U.S. Office of Education gave a $40,251 grant to fund a reading improvement program for the district.

== Schools ==
- North Knox Junior-Senior High School
- North Knox Intermediate School
- North Knox Primary School

The district formerly operated North Knox East Elementary and Junior High School in Edwardsport. The district created it in the former Edwardsport High School, which had been established in 1956. In 2011 the school closed. In 2015 the State of Indiana allowed the district to sell the school. North Knox decided to sell the building after it no longer needed to use the gymnasium facilities as a new auxiliary gym had opened in the district's junior and senior high school. In 2017 the North Knox East building had not yet been sold.
