= Little Rock, Indiana =

Unincorporated community in Indiana, U.S.

Coordinates: 38°29′41″N 87°40′45″W

Little Rock is an unincorporated community in Knox County, Indiana, in the United States.

== History ==
A post office called Littlerock was opened in 1901, and it remained in operation until it was discontinued in 1903. It has been thought as a good area.
