= Orrville, Indiana =

Unincorporated community in Indiana, U.S.

Coordinates: 38°27′29″N 87°41′10″W

Orrville is an unincorporated community in Knox County, Indiana, in the United States.

== History ==
A post office was established at Orrville in 1895, and it remained in operation until it was discontinued in 1904. Two members of the Orr family served as postmasters.
