= Fritchton, Indiana =

- Unincorporated community
- Location within Indiana Location within the United States
- Coordinates: 38°40′49″N 87°25′23″W
- Country: United States
- State: Indiana
- County: Knox
- Township: Palmyra
- Elevation: 531 ft (162 m)
- ZIP code: 47591
- FIPS code: 18-26062
- GNIS feature ID: 434873

Fritchton is an unincorporated community in Palmyra Township, Knox County, Indiana approximately 4 miles (6.4 km) east of Vincennes.

== History ==
A post office was established at Fritchton in 1893, and remained in operation until it was discontinued in 1915. Emil H. Fritch served as postmaster. The high school was built in 1911 and closed in 1967. The school served grades 1 through 12.

== Geography ==
Fritchton is located at 38°40′49″N 87°25′23″W.
