= Edwardsport, Indiana =

- Town
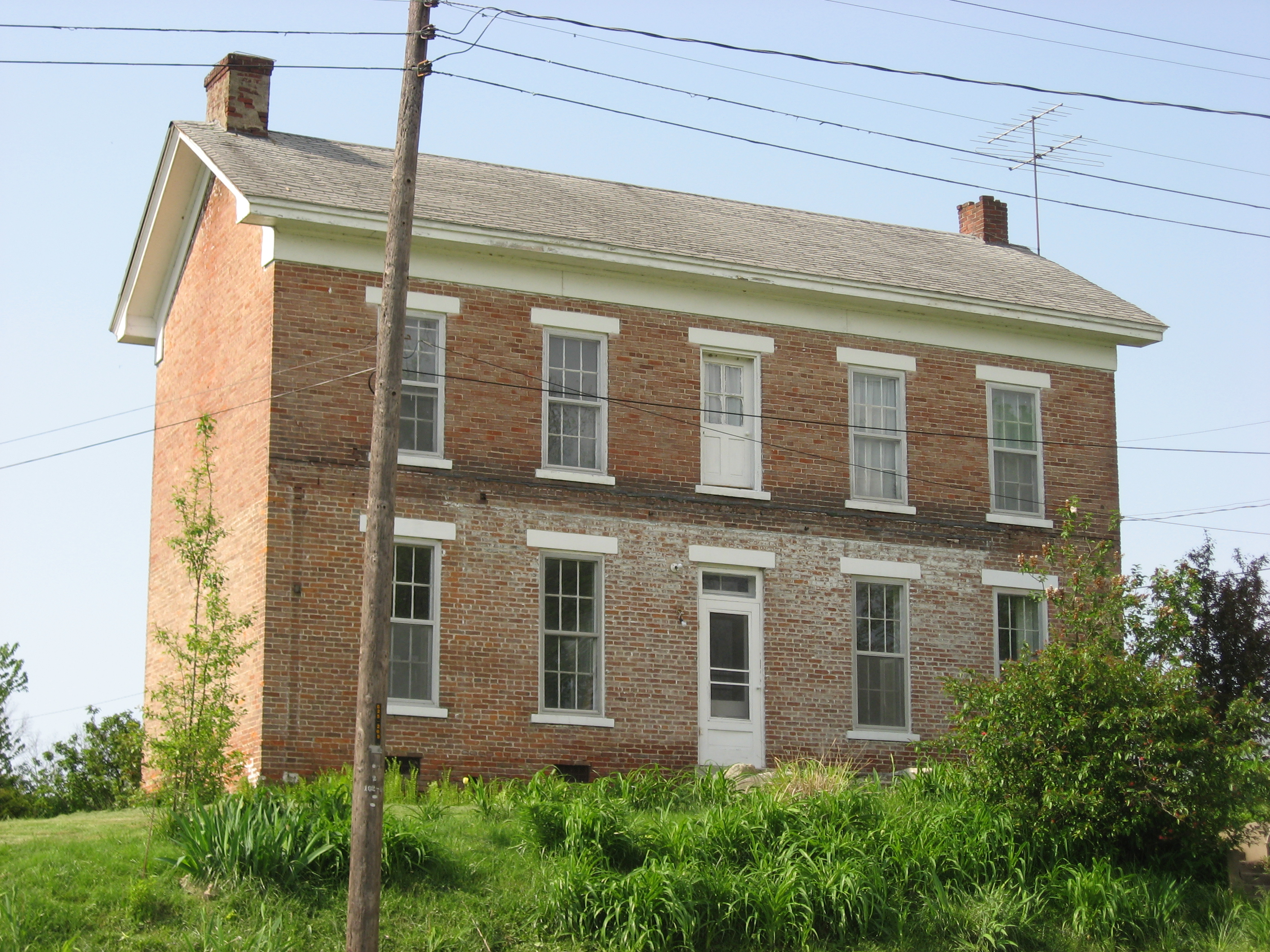
- The Alfred Simonson House, a historic site in the town

- Location of Edwardsport in Knox County, Indiana
- Coordinates: 38°48′49″N 87°14′59″W
- Country: United States
- State: Indiana
- County: Knox
- Township: Vigo

Area
  - Total: 0.28 sq mi (0.72 km^{2})
  - Land: 0.28 sq mi (0.72 km^{2})
  - Water: 0 sq mi (0.00 km^{2})
- Elevation: 479 ft (146 m)

Population (2020)
  - Total: 286
  - Density: 1,026.6/sq mi (396.38/km^{2})
- Time zone: UTC-5 (EST)
  - Summer (DST): UTC-4 (EDT)
- ZIP code: 47528
- Area code: 812
- FIPS code: 18-20458
- GNIS feature ID: 2396922

Edwardsport is a town in Vigo Township, Knox County, Indiana, United States. The population was 286 at the 2020 census. It was founded in 1832 and named after Edward Wilkins, a founding father.

== History ==
Alfred Simonson House was added to the National Register of Historic Places in 2009.

== Geography ==
According to the 2010 census, Edwardsport has a total area of 0.28 square miles (0.73 km^{2}), all land.

=== Climate ===
The climate in this area is characterized by hot, humid summers and generally mild to cool winters. According to the Köppen Climate Classification system, Edwardsport has a humid subtropical climate, abbreviated "Cfa" on climate maps.

== Demographics ==
Historical population
Census	Pop.	Note	%±
1880	777		—
1890	670		−13.8%
1960	533		—
1970	482		−9.6%
1980	459		−4.8%
1990	380		−17.2%
2000	363		−4.5%
2010	303		−16.5%
2020	286		−5.6%
U.S. Decennial Census

=== 2010 census ===
As of the census of 2010, there were 303 people, 128 households, and 87 families living in the town. The population density was 1,082.1 inhabitants per square mile (417.8/km^{2}). There were 169 housing units at an average density of 603.6 per square mile (233.1/km^{2}). The racial makeup of the town was 98.3% White, 0.3% Pacific Islander, 0.7% from other races, and 0.7% from two or more races. Hispanic or Latino of any race were 1.7% of the population.

There were 128 households, of which 25.8% had children under the age of 18 living with them, 52.3% were married couples living together, 10.2% had a female householder with no husband present, 5.5% had a male householder with no wife present, and 32.0% were non-families. 29.7% of all households were made up of individuals, and 10.9% had someone living alone who was 65 years of age or older. The average household size was 2.37 and the average family size was 2.85.

The median age in the town was 45.2 years. 19.5% of residents were under the age of 18; 6.3% were between the ages of 18 and 24; 23.5% were from 25 to 44; 35.6% were from 45 to 64; and 15.2% were 65 years of age or older. The gender makeup of the town was 50.8% male and 49.2% female.

=== 2000 census ===
As of the census of 2000, there were 363 people, 151 households, and 104 families living in the town. The population density was 1,305.3 inhabitants per square mile (504.0/km^{2}). There were 170 housing units at an average density of 611.3 per square mile (236.0/km^{2}). The racial makeup of the town was 97.80% White, 0.55% African American, 0.28% Native American, and 1.38% from other races. Hispanic or Latino of any race were 1.65% of the population.

There were 151 households, out of which 31.8% had children under the age of 18 living with them, 56.3% were married couples living together, 7.9% had a female householder with no husband present, and 31.1% were non-families. 27.8% of all households were made up of individuals, and 14.6% had someone living alone who was 65 years of age or older. The average household size was 2.40 and the average family size was 2.88.

In the town, the population was spread out, with 22.9% under the age of 18, 10.5% from 18 to 24, 31.1% from 25 to 44, 24.0% from 45 to 64, and 11.6% who were 65 years of age or older. The median age was 37 years. For every 100 females, there were 100.6 males. For every 100 females age 18 and over, there were 104.4 males.

The median income for a household in the town was $26,750, and the median income for a family was $31,979. Males had a median income of $26,979 versus $17,917 for females. The per capita income for the town was $13,541. About 15.6% of families and 20.5% of the population were below the poverty line, including 38.5% of those under age 18 and 8.9% of those age 65 or over.

== Education ==
It is in the North Knox School Corporation. The district's schools are North Knox Primary School, North Knox Intermediate School, and North Knox Junior-Senior High School.

The district formerly operated North Knox East Elementary and Junior High School in Edwardsport. The district created it in the former Edwardsport High School, which had been established in 1956. In 2011 the school closed. In 2015 the State of Indiana allowed the district to sell the school. North Knox decided to sell the building after it no longer needed to use the gymnasium facilities as a new auxiliary gym had opened in the district's junior and senior high school. In 2017 the North Knox East building had not yet been sold.

== Power generation ==
The Edwardsport Power Station located to the south of the town provides energy to the region. The plant has two units totalling 160 megawatt capacity. A report by the WWF in 2005 ranked it as the second most polluting power station in the industrialized world, in terms of the level of carbon dioxide produced per unit of electricity generated.

A third IGCC unit, of 600 megawatts, is under construction. When it opens in 2011, units one and two are to be decommissioned.

== See also ==
- List of least carbon efficient power stations
