= Busseron Township, Knox County, Indiana =

Busseron Township
- Township
- Coordinates: 38°50′52″N 87°28′14″W
- Country: United States
- State: Indiana
- County: Knox

Government
  - Type: Indiana township

Area
  - Total: 52.7 sq mi (136 km^{2})
  - Land: 51.83 sq mi (134.2 km^{2})
  - Water: 0.86 sq mi (2.2 km^{2})
- Elevation: 430 ft (131 m)

Population (2020)
  - Total: 1,268
  - Density: 24.46/sq mi (9.446/km^{2})
- FIPS code: 18-09514
- GNIS feature ID: 453147

Busseron Township is one of ten townships in Knox County, Indiana. As of the 2020 census, its population was 1,268 (down from 1,393 at 2010) and it contained 639 housing units. It contains the census-designated place of Emison.

Historical population
Census	Pop.	Note	%±
1890	1,729		—
1900	2,136		23.5%
1910	2,202		3.1%
1920	2,040		−7.4%
1930	2,029		−0.5%
1940	1,915		−5.6%
1950	1,690		−11.7%
1960	1,657		−2.0%
1970	1,481		−10.6%
1980	1,485		0.3%
1990	1,372		−7.6%
2000	1,385		0.9%
2010	1,393		0.6%
2020	1,268		−9.0%
Source: US Decennial Census

== History ==
Busseron Township was founded about 1810. It is named for François Riday Busseron, a French resident of the area during the American Revolution.

== Geography ==
According to the 2010 census, the township has a total area of 52.7 square miles (136 km^{2}), of which 51.83 square miles (134.2 km^{2}) (or 98.35%) is land and 0.86 square miles (2.2 km^{2}) (or 1.63%) is water.

== Education ==
It is in the North Knox School Corporation.

== See also ==
- Busseron Creek
