= Dan Beery =

American rower

Personal information
- Full name: Daniel Beery
- Born: January 4, 1975 (age 51) Oaktown, Indiana, U.S.
Medal record
Men's rowing
Representing the United States
Olympic Games
Gold medal – first place	2004 Athens	Eight
World Championships
Gold medal – first place	2003 Milano	Coxed pair
Gold medal – first place	2005 Kaizu	Eight
Gold medal – first place	2007 Munich	Coxed four
Silver medal – second place	2002 Seville	Coxed pair
World Cup
Gold medal – first place	2004 Lucerne	Four
Pan American Games
Gold medal – first place	2007 Rio de Janeiro	Eight
Silver medal – second place	2007 Rio de Janeiro	Coxless pairs

Daniel Beery (born January 4, 1975) is an American competition rower, Olympic champion, world champion and world cup gold medalist.

Beery won a gold medal in Men's Eights at the 2004 Summer Olympics, as a member of the American team. The time 5:19.85 was a new world record. Beery is a member of the New York Athletic Club's Hall of Fame. He retired from rowing in 2008. Prior to his start in rowing at the University of Tennessee Chattanooga, Beery played collegiate basketball.

After proposing via text message, he married American Olympic rower Jennifer Goldsack on January 17, 2009 - they first met at the US Rowing Training Center in Princeton, but they first became properly acquainted at the 2007 world championships in Munich. Dan is now remarried to Sabrina Iffland and they have 2 children together.

He now works as a sports insurance broker in Philadelphia, Pennsylvania.
