= Kixmiller's Store =

- U.S. National Register of Historic Places
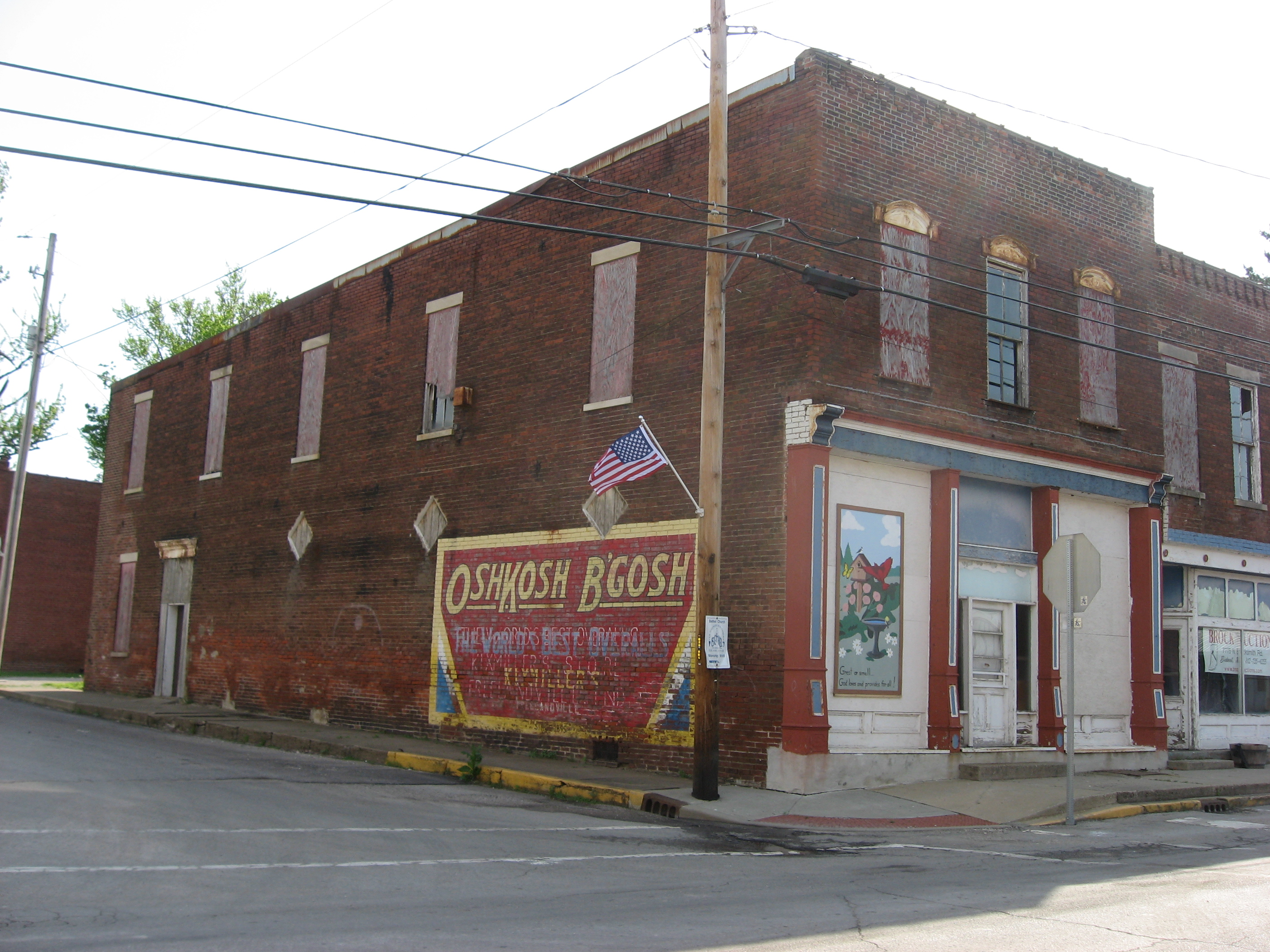
- Kixmiller's Store, April 2011

- Location within Indiana Location within the United States
- Location: Carlise and Indianapolis Sts., Freelandville, Indiana
- Coordinates: 38°51′54″N 87°18′19″W
- Area: 1 acre (0.40 ha)
- Built: 1866, 1878
- NRHP reference No.: 78000035
- Added to NRHP: December 8, 1978

Kixmiller's Store was a historic commercial building located at Freelandville, Indiana. Built in 1866 and expanded in 1878, it was a two-story, block long, brick building containing four storefronts. The building measured 140 feet by 108 feet by 135 feet. Its architecture reflected some Italianate style design influences. It was added to the National Register of Historic Places in 1978.

Kixmiller's was demolished by its owner on February 20, 2017, as structural deterioration had left it in a dangerous and irreparable state.
