= Busseron Creek =

Location
- Country: United States
- State: Indiana
- Region: Sullivan and Knox

Physical characteristics
- Source
  - location: Vigo County
  - coordinates: 39°17′46″N 87°18′14″W
- Mouth: Wabash River
  - location: 10 miles (16 km) above Vincennes, Indiana
  - coordinates: 38°56′06″N 87°31′01″W

Busseron Creek is a 50 miles (80 km) long creek that runs south-westward through Sullivan County, Indiana and Knox County, Indiana and that is a tributary of the Wabash River.

Old Busseron Creek enters the Wabash at 38°50′17″N 87°31′34″W and is the old course of the creek before it was re-routed and straightened for flood control purposes, leaving (but not connecting to) the new course at 38°56′02″N 87°30′11″W having to that point run beside the current Busseron over several meanders, the re-routing having left behind several oxbow lakes, from headwaters at 38°56′35″N 87°27′58″W.

== Hydrology ==
The following gaging stations are located on the Creek:

Location	Coordinates	Drainage area	Datum (above mean sea level)	Source
Sullivan County, bridge on CR900N 1.9 miles (3.1 km) west of Hymera	39°12′54″N 87°18′41″W	16.7 square miles (430 ka)	480.0 feet (146.3 m)	
Sullivan County, bridge on SH44 1.4 miles (2.3 km) upstream from the mouth of West Fork and 1.5 miles (2.4 km) west of Hymera	39°11′10″N 87°19′44″W	14.4 square miles (370 ka)	476.0 feet (145.1 m)	
Sullivan County, bridge on SR54 1.7 miles (2.7 km) upstream of Buttermilk Creek	39°04′33″N 87°23′11″W	13.8 square miles (360 ka)	440.0 feet (134.1 m)	

Tributaries of Busseron Creek in Sullivan include Mud Creek, Sulfur Creek and Buttermilk Creek. Out of their combined drainage area of 47 square miles (1,200 ka), just over 8 square miles (210 ka) had been surface mined, and damaged by improper reclamation, by the early 1970s.

== Settlement ==
=== West Union ===
The Creek was settled by Shakers in July 1813, the settlement at its largest comprising 1,300 acres (530 ha) and about 400 people. They founded a village named West Union (sometimes known as Shakertown or Busro) that included a 48 by 50 feet (15 by 15 m) wooden-frame meeting house. Most of the buildings in the community were finished with walnut, except for one communal 40 by 50 feet (12 by 15 m) brick residence for prayer meetings and containing dormitories on four stories for 60 people, that was torn down in the 19th century.

They raised livestock, including cattle and sheep, and were in horticulture, having a 40 acres (16 ha) fruit orchard. On the Creek itself they built a water-powered sawmill and a water-powered grist mill, and they manufactured lumber of cedar and walnut. There was some silk manufacturing with a cocoonery.

=== Busserons ===
There were two planned settlements named Busseron near to the Creek that failed to become reality, one in Knox and one in Sullivan.

The Busseron in Knox County, located at 38°50′08″N 87°26′57″W, was surveyed by George Calhoun in 1854. W. W. Harper, J. A. McClure and T. P. Emison were proprietors. It was a railroad stop on the Evansville & Terre Haute Railroad but had never got beyond being simply a railroad station, although twenty lots each 100 feet square had been laid out, by 1886.

The proprietors of the Busseron in Sullivan County were James B. McCall and James Dunkin. Originally, according to its 1815-06-21 advertisement by their agent David Porter, it was going to be named Indiana and had "12 lots in a square" and was 20 miles (32 km) north of Vincennes. It was advertised as being within 2 to 5 miles (3.2 to 8.0 km) of the West Union mills. This was one of several failed proposals for where the Knox county seat was to be. The area, clearly only a land speculation, was put up for sale for delinquency on taxes on 1818-01-17.

=== "Old Purchase" ===
Another mill, in Sullivan, was Ledgerwood's Mill, which with an accompanying 5 acres (2.0 ha) of land was put up for sale by William Ledgerwood on 1814-06-03. This was part of the "Old Purchase", lands ceded by the Native Americans to the French in 1742 and confirmed by a treaty of 1803, and the first settled parts of Sullivan County. The family of James Ledgerwood was the first significant settler in the area, and they settled on the parts of the Creek that are in Sullivan and those that were separated off in 1808 to become Busseron Township in Knox.

=== Others ===
The grist mill to the south-east of Hymera (somewhere around 39°10′41″N 87°18′54″W) erected in 1829 was on the Creek.
