= Knox County, Indiana =

County in Indiana, United States

- County
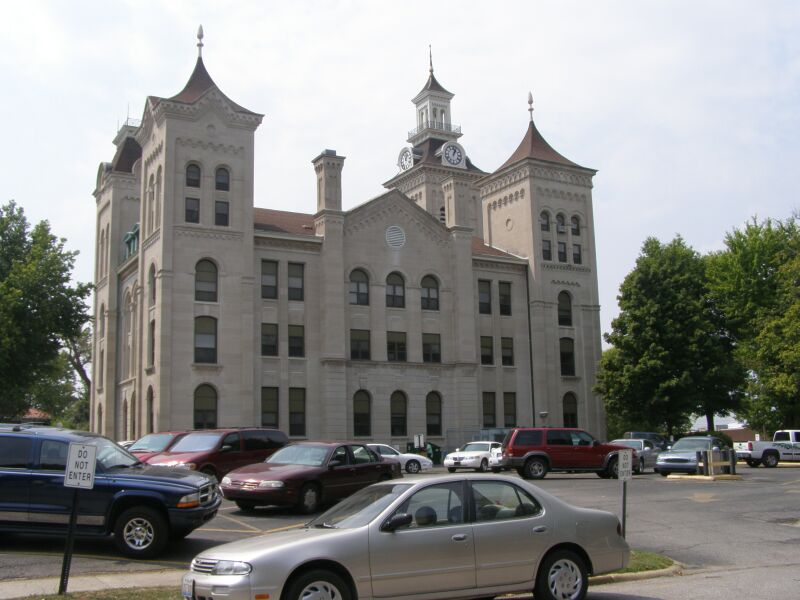
- Knox County Courthouse, Vincennes

- Seal

- Location within the U.S. state of Indiana
- Coordinates: 38°41′N 87°25′W
- Country: United States
- State: Indiana
- Founded: June 6, 1790
- Named for: Henry Knox
- Seat: Vincennes
- Largest city: Vincennes

Area
  - Total: 524.04 sq mi (1,357.3 km^{2})
  - Land: 516.03 sq mi (1,336.5 km^{2})
  - Water: 8.01 sq mi (20.7 km^{2})

Population (2020)
  - Total: 36,282
  - Estimate (2025): 35,652 ▼
  - Density: 70.310/sq mi (27.147/km^{2})
- Time zone: UTC−5 (Eastern)
  - Summer (DST): UTC−4 (EDT)
- Congressional district: 8th
- Website: knoxcounty.in.gov
- Indiana county number 42: Oldest county in Indiana and Indiana Territory; Eighth largest county in Indiana by area

Knox County is a county in the U.S. state of Indiana in the United States. The oldest county in Indiana, it was one of two original counties created in the Northwest Territory in 1790, alongside St. Clair County, Illinois. Knox County was gradually reduced in size as subsequent counties were established. It was established in its present configuration when Daviess County was partitioned off (February 2, 1818). At the 2020 United States census, the county population was 36,282. The county seat is Vincennes. Knox County comprises the Vincennes, IN Micropolitan Statistical Area.

== History ==
In 1790, Winthrop Sargent, Secretary of Northwest Territory, organized Knox County, the fourth in the Northwest Territory. It was named for Major General Henry Knox, who had completed his term as second U.S. Secretary of War the previous September. Knox County was created prior to the formation of the Indiana Territory. When it was created, Knox County extended to Canada and encompassed all or part of the present states of Indiana, Michigan, Illinois, and Ohio. When the Illinois Territory was formed in 1809, the portions of Knox County beyond the Wabash River became Saint Clair County, Illinois.

Many of Knox County townships and lots were surveyed with the French system, which employs non-cardinal compass points. Knox and Clark counties are the only ones laid out in this fashion.

Knox County is historically known for its Cherry Trees and Orchards.

== Geography ==
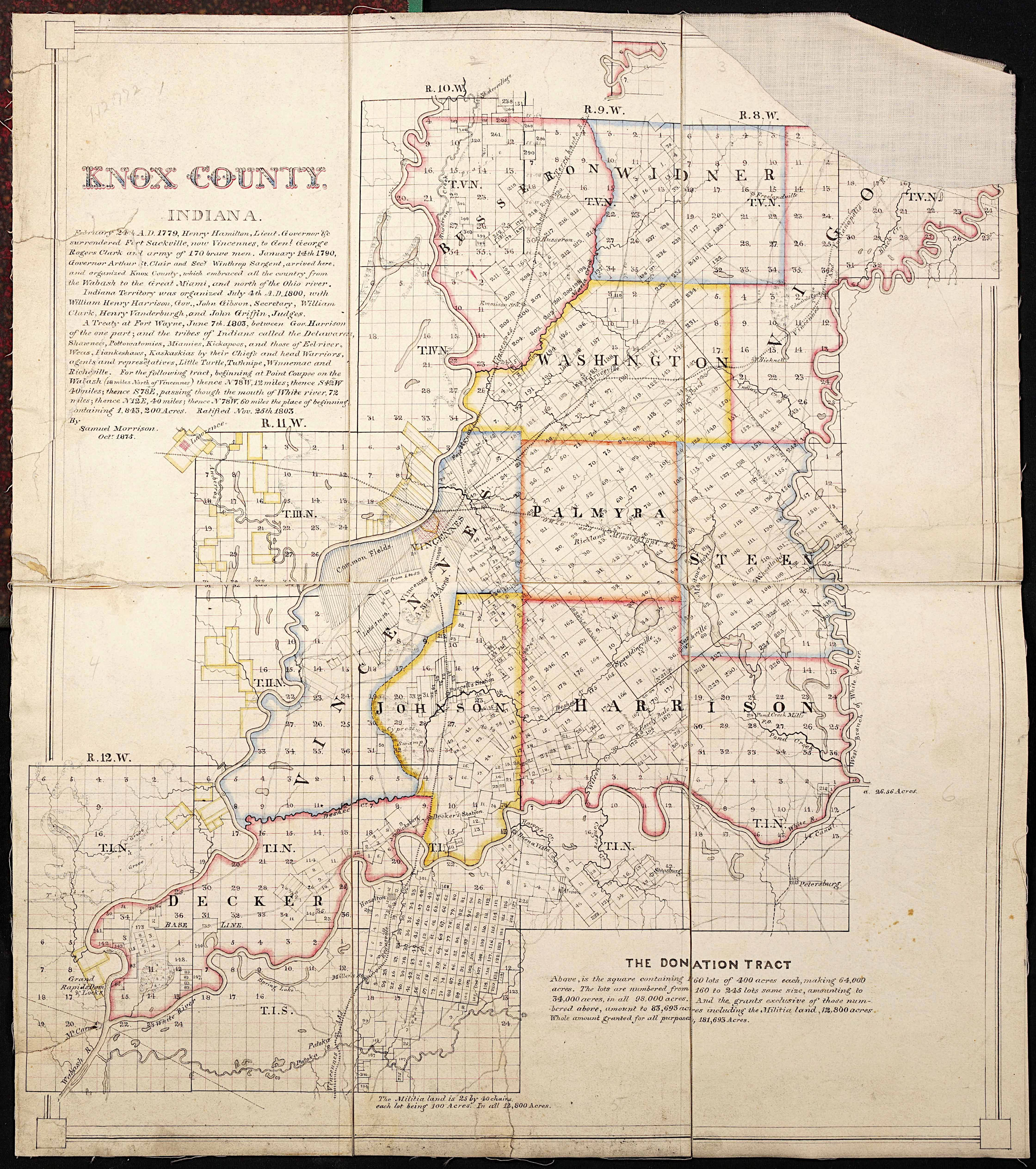
1875 county map

Knox County lies on the west edge of the state; its western border abuts the eastern border of Illinois across the Wabash River. According to the 2010 census, the county has a total area of 524.04 square miles (1,357.3 km^{2}), of which 516.03 square miles (1,336.5 km^{2}) (or 98.47%) is land and 8.01 square miles (20.7 km^{2}) (or 1.53%) is water. The county's west border is defined by the south-flowing Wabash River, and its east border is defined by the south-southwest-flowing White River. Its southwesternmost point occurs at the confluence of the two rivers, near Mount Carmel, Illinois. The terrain consists of verdant low-rolling hills, largely devoted to agriculture. Its highest points (around 620 feet/190 meters ASL) occur in the hills midway between Bruceville and Bicknell.

=== Major highways ===
- US 41
- US 50
- US 150
- SR 58
- SR 59
- SR 61
- SR 67
- SR 159
- SR 241
- SR 358
- SR 441
- SR 550

=== Adjacent counties ===
- Sullivan County - north
- Greene County - northeast
- Daviess County - east
- Pike County - southeast
- Gibson County - south
- Wabash County, Illinois - southwest
- Lawrence County, Illinois - west
- Crawford County, Illinois - northwest

=== National protected area ===
- George Rogers Clark National Historical Park

== Communities ==
=== Cities ===
- Bicknell
- Vincennes

=== Towns ===
- Bruceville
- Decker
- Edwardsport
- Monroe City
- Oaktown
- Sandborn
- Wheatland

=== Census-designated places ===
- Emison
- Freelandville
- Ragsdale
- Westphalia

=== Unincorporated areas ===
- Beal
- Busseron
- Fritchton
- Iona
- Little Rock
- Orrville
- Purcell
- Saint Thomas
- Verne
- Wagner Station

== Townships ==
- Busseron
- Decker
- Harrison
- Johnson
- Palmyra
- Steen
- Vigo
- Vincennes
- Washington
- Widner

== Climate and weather ==
Vincennes, Indiana

Climate chart (precipitation, max. and min. temperature)
J	F	M	A	M	J	J	A	S	O	N	D
2.6 38 20	2.5 43 23	3.6 53 32	4.3 65 42	5.1 75 52	4.1 84 61	4.7 88 65	3.7 86 63	3.2 80 54	3.2 68 42	4.3 54 33	3.2 43 25
- █ Average max. and min. temperatures in °F
- █ Precipitation totals in inches
- Source: The Weather Channel
Metric conversion
J	F	M	A	M	J	J	A	S	O	N	D
66 3 −7	64 6 −5	91 12 0	109 18 6	130 24 11	103 29 16	119 31 18	94 30 17	80 27 12	82 20 6	108 12 1	82 6 −4
- █ Average max. and min. temperatures in °C
- █ Precipitation totals in mm

In recent years, the average temperature in Vincennes has ranged from a low of 20 °F (−7 °C) in January to a high of 88 °F (31 °C) in July, although a record low of −26 °F (−32 °C) was recorded in January 1994 and a record high of 104 °F (40 °C) was recorded in June 1988. Average monthly precipitation ranged from 2.51 inches (64 mm) in February to 5.13 inches (130 mm) in May.

== Government ==
Knox County Sheriff's Department

Jurisdictional structure
- Operations jurisdiction: Knox, Indiana, United States
- Legal jurisdiction: As per operations jurisdiction
- General nature: Local civilian police

Operational structure
- Agency executive: Doug Vantlin, Sheriff

The county government is a constitutional body, and is granted specific powers by the Constitution of Indiana, and by the Indiana Code.

County Council: The legislative branch of the county government; controls the county's spending and revenue collection. Representatives are elected from county districts to four-year terms. They set salaries, the annual budget, and special spending. The council has limited authority to impose local taxes, in the form of an income and property tax that is subject to state level approval, excise taxes, and service taxes.

Board of Commissioners: The executive body of the county. The commissioners are elected county-wide to staggered four-year terms. One commissioner serves as president. The commissioners are charged with executing the legislative acts of the County Council, collecting revenue, and managing the county government's functions.

Court: The county maintains a small claims court that can handle some civil cases. The court judge is elected to a four-year term, and must be a member of the Indiana Bar Association. The judge is assisted by a constable, who is elected county-wide to a four-year term. Some court decisions can be appealed to the state level circuit court.

County Officials: The county has several other elected offices, including sheriff, coroner, auditor, treasurer, recorder, surveyor, and circuit court clerk. Each is elected county-wide to a four-year term. Members elected to county government positions are required to declare party affiliations and to be residents of the county.

Knox County is part of Indiana's 8th congressional district, Indiana Senate districts 39 and 48, and Indiana House of Representatives districts 45 and 64.

Maintaining a Democratic tendency in the first half of the 20th century, Knox County was a bellwether in all but one presidential election between 1912 and 2004, the exception being 1924. After falling 6.5 points short of being won by Democratic victor Barack Obama (of neighboring Illinois) in 2008, Knox County has become a Republican stronghold, with Donald Trump garnering 74% of the vote in 2024.

United States presidential election results for Knox County, Indiana
Year	Republican		Democratic		Third party(ies)	
Year	No.	%	No.	%	No.	%
1888	2,922	43.57%	3,621	53.99%	164	2.45%
1892	2,653	38.81%	3,417	49.99%	765	11.19%
1896	3,480	43.87%	4,349	54.83%	103	1.30%
1900	3,554	43.28%	4,443	54.10%	215	2.62%
1904	4,278	47.94%	4,093	45.87%	552	6.19%
1908	4,247	42.53%	5,116	51.24%	622	6.23%
1912	2,805	28.76%	4,448	45.61%	2,499	25.63%
1916	4,805	42.28%	5,380	47.34%	1,179	10.37%
1920	10,011	51.39%	8,052	41.34%	1,416	7.27%
1924	8,493	44.31%	8,603	44.88%	2,072	10.81%
1928	10,035	49.92%	9,837	48.93%	232	1.15%
1932	6,590	31.17%	14,084	66.62%	466	2.20%
1936	8,589	38.34%	13,669	61.02%	142	0.63%
1940	11,211	47.52%	12,265	51.99%	114	0.48%
1944	10,023	48.98%	10,297	50.32%	143	0.70%
1948	9,250	43.67%	11,650	55.00%	282	1.33%
1952	12,786	57.30%	9,384	42.05%	146	0.65%
1956	13,047	59.85%	8,691	39.87%	63	0.29%
1960	11,490	53.40%	9,918	46.10%	108	0.50%
1964	7,612	37.29%	12,678	62.11%	121	0.59%
1968	8,369	46.97%	7,297	40.95%	2,152	12.08%
1972	11,940	65.62%	6,089	33.46%	167	0.92%
1976	9,100	48.25%	9,612	50.97%	148	0.78%
1980	10,083	53.57%	7,829	41.59%	910	4.83%
1984	10,872	62.27%	6,417	36.75%	170	0.97%
1988	9,813	58.13%	7,006	41.50%	62	0.37%
1992	6,683	38.67%	6,718	38.87%	3,883	22.47%
1996	6,395	41.17%	7,003	45.09%	2,134	13.74%
2000	8,485	56.36%	6,300	41.85%	269	1.79%
2004	9,990	63.44%	5,649	35.88%	107	0.68%
2008	8,639	52.60%	7,569	46.08%	216	1.32%
2012	9,612	63.47%	5,228	34.52%	305	2.01%
2016	11,077	71.00%	3,772	24.18%	753	4.83%
2020	11,655	72.72%	4,067	25.37%	306	1.91%
2024	11,236	74.30%	3,625	23.97%	262	1.73%

== Demographics ==
Historical population
Census	Pop.	Note	%±
1800	2,517		—
1810	7,945		215.7%
1820	5,437		−31.6%
1830	6,525		20.0%
1840	10,657		63.3%
1850	11,084		4.0%
1860	16,056		44.9%
1870	21,562		34.3%
1880	26,324		22.1%
1890	28,044		6.5%
1900	32,746		16.8%
1910	39,183		19.7%
1920	46,195		17.9%
1930	43,813		−5.2%
1940	43,973		0.4%
1950	43,415		−1.3%
1960	41,561		−4.3%
1970	41,546		0.0%
1980	41,838		0.7%
1990	39,884		−4.7%
2000	39,256		−1.6%
2010	38,440		−2.1%
2020	36,282		−5.6%
2025 (est.)	35,652	▼	−1.7%
US Decennial Census; 1790-1960 1900-1990; 1990-2000 2010

=== Racial and ethnic composition ===
Knox County, Indiana – Racial and ethnic composition Note: the US Census treats Hispanic/Latino as an ethnic category. This table excludes Latinos from the racial categories and assigns them to a separate category. Hispanics/Latinos may be of any race.
Race / Ethnicity (NH = Non-Hispanic)	Pop 1980	Pop 1990	Pop 2000	Pop 2010	Pop 2020	% 1980	% 1990	% 2000	% 2010	% 2020
White alone (NH)	40,960	38,950	37,667	36,154	33,027	97.90%	97.66%	95.95%	94.05%	91.03%
Black or African American alone (NH)	444	478	726	994	696	1.06%	1.20%	1.85%	2.59%	1.92%
Native American or Alaska Native alone (NH)	44	68	77	64	67	0.11%	0.17%	0.20%	0.17%	0.18%
Asian alone (NH)	98	177	202	214	283	0.23%	0.44%	0.51%	0.56%	0.78%
Native Hawaiian or Pacific Islander alone (NH)	x	x	17	11	13	x	x	0.04%	0.03%	0.04%
Other race alone (NH)	116	6	6	19	104	0.28%	0.02%	0.02%	0.05%	0.29%
Mixed race or Multiracial (NH)	x	x	239	394	1,087	x	x	0.61%	1.02%	3.00%
Hispanic or Latino (any race)	176	205	322	590	1,005	0.42%	0.51%	0.82%	1.53%	2.77%
Total	41,838	39,884	39,256	38,440	36,282	100.00%	100.00%	100.00%	100.00%	100.00%

=== 2020 census ===
As of the 2020 census, the county had a population of 36,282. The median age was 40.0 years. 22.0% of residents were under the age of 18 and 19.0% of residents were 65 years of age or older. For every 100 females there were 99.8 males, and for every 100 females age 18 and over there were 98.9 males age 18 and over.

The racial makeup of the county was 92.0% White, 2.0% Black or African American, 0.2% American Indian and Alaska Native, 0.8% Asian, <0.1% Native Hawaiian and Pacific Islander, 1.2% from some other race, and 3.8% from two or more races. Hispanic or Latino residents of any race comprised 2.8% of the population.

54.6% of residents lived in urban areas, while 45.4% lived in rural areas.

There were 14,783 households in the county, of which 27.9% had children under the age of 18 living in them. Of all households, 45.5% were married-couple households, 20.1% were households with a male householder and no spouse or partner present, and 27.0% were households with a female householder and no spouse or partner present. About 31.8% of all households were made up of individuals and 14.4% had someone living alone who was 65 years of age or older.

There were 16,917 housing units, of which 12.6% were vacant. Among occupied housing units, 67.3% were owner-occupied and 32.7% were renter-occupied. The homeowner vacancy rate was 1.9% and the rental vacancy rate was 12.0%.

=== 2010 census ===
As of the 2010 United States census, there were 38,440 people, 15,249 households, and 9,725 families in the county. The population density was 74.5 inhabitants per square mile (28.8/km^{2}). There were 17,038 housing units at an average density of 33.0 per square mile (12.7/km^{2}). The racial makeup of the county was 94.9% white, 2.6% black or African American, 0.6% Asian, 0.2% American Indian, 0.5% from other races, and 1.2% from two or more races. Those of Hispanic or Latino origin made up 1.5% of the population. In terms of ancestry, 26.9% were German, 19.9% were American, 13.0% were Irish, and 9.1% were English.

Of the 15,249 households, 29.1% had children under the age of 18 living with them, 48.5% were married couples living together, 11.1% had a female householder with no husband present, 36.2% were non-families, and 30.1% of all households were made up of individuals. The average household size was 2.35 and the average family size was 2.90. The median age was 38.5 years.

The median income for a household in the county was $47,697 and the median income for a family was $51,534. Males had a median income of $40,553 versus $27,201 for females. The per capita income for the county was $20,381. About 12.6% of families and 16.4% of the population were below the poverty line, including 22.7% of those under age 18 and 11.4% of those age 65 or over.

== Workforce ==
In 2005, Knox County had 998 business units and 16,240 jobs. The largest employing industry in the county was education and health services (including both public and private employment) with almost 34 percent of total industry employment. Trade, transportation, and utilities came in second with over 22 percent of total industry employment. Manufacturing showed the most job growth and the largest percentage gain since 2001, increasing 316 jobs or almost 21 percent.

The 2005 all industry earnings average for Knox County was $26,875, up $2,824 or 11.7 percent over the county's 2001 average. The manufacturing industry had the highest average annual earnings at $33,238, increasing $1,695 since 2001. Annual earnings in the information sector increased the most between 2001 and 2005, up $6,518 or 29.7 percent.

The Vincennes area has a diversified economy. In 2005 retail trade was the largest of 20 major sectors. It had an average wage per job of $19,743. Per capita income grew by 17.9% between 1994 and 2004 (adjusted for inflation). While manufacturing accounts for 8.2% of the jobs, the services sector is rapidly growing. Knox County's ground breaking Pathways Program insures a well-trained, highly motivated labor force. Knox County encompasses an area that attracts approximately 300,000 potential employees within an easy commute. Because of the proximity of the surrounding counties, and ease of access to the Vincennes area, businesses routinely draw from a labor force that lies within a 50-mile radius of their work site.

== Education ==
School districts in the county include North Knox School Corporation, South Knox School Corporation, and Vincennes Community School Corporation.

== See also ==
- National Register of Historic Places listings in Knox County, Indiana
- Frederick Hinde Zimmerman
