= Ragsdale, Indiana =

- Census-designated place
- Location in Knox County, Indiana

- Location within Indiana Location within the United States
- Coordinates: 38°44′45″N 87°19′30″W
- Country: United States
- State: Indiana
- County: Knox
- Township: Washington

Area
  - Total: 2.23 sq mi (5.77 km^{2})
  - Land: 2.23 sq mi (5.77 km^{2})
  - Water: 0 sq mi (0.00 km^{2})
- Elevation: 564 ft (172 m)

Population (2020)
  - Total: 119
  - Density: 53.4/sq mi (20.62/km^{2})
- ZIP code: 47573
- FIPS code: 18-62730
- GNIS feature ID: 441730

Ragsdale is an unincorporated community and census-designated place in Washington Township, Knox County, Indiana. As of the 2020 census, Ragsdale had a population of 119.

== Geography ==
Ragsdale is located in eastern Knox County at 38°44′45″N 87°19′30″W. It is 13 miles (21 km) northeast of Vincennes, the county seat, and the same distance northwest of Washington.

According to the U.S. Census Bureau, the Ragsdale CDP has an area of 2.2 square miles (5.8 km^{2}), all of it land.

== Demographics ==
Historical population
Census	Pop.	Note	%±
2020	119		—
U.S. Decennial Census

== Education ==
It is in the North Knox School Corporation.
