= Oaktown, Indiana =

- Town
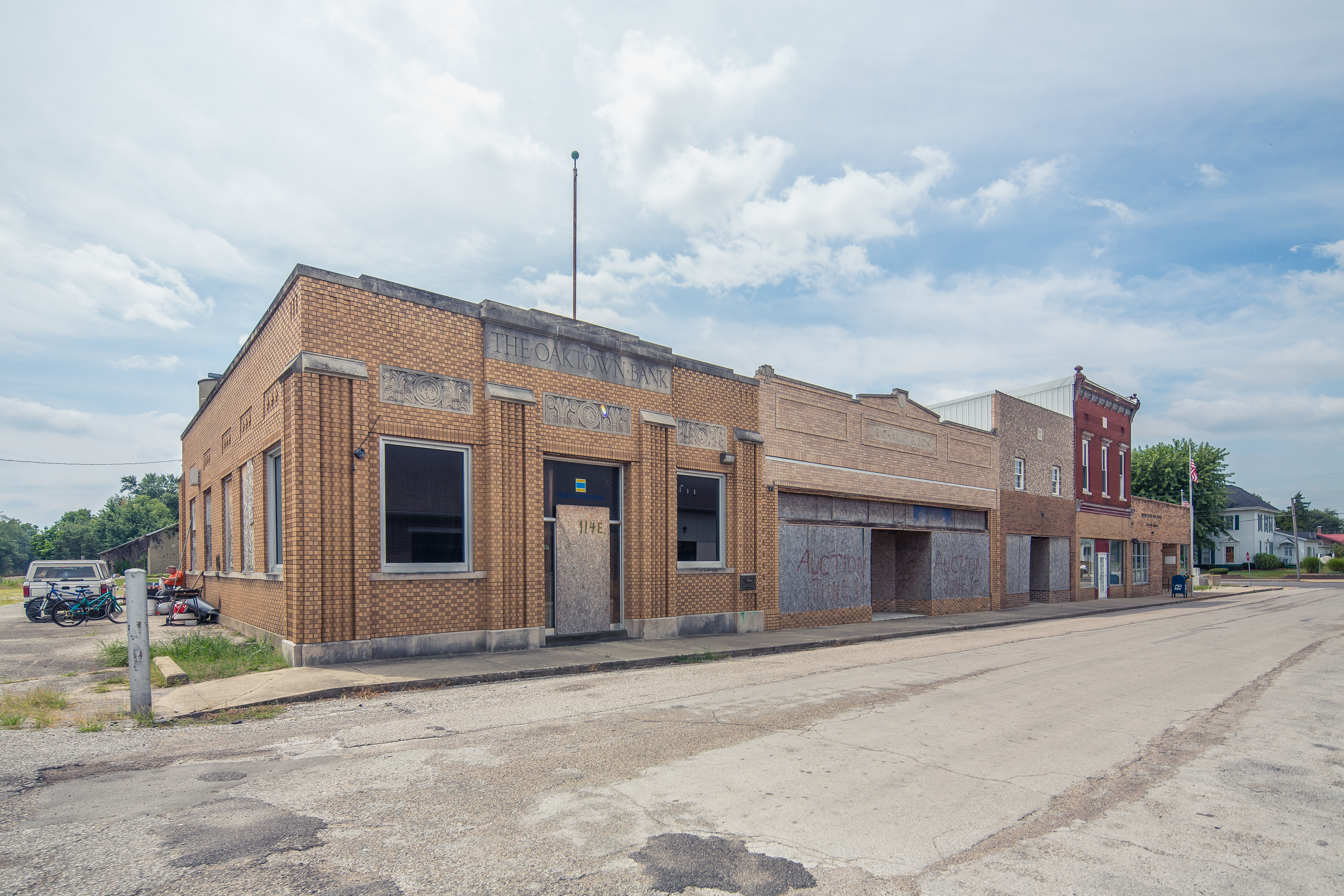

- Location of Oaktown in Knox County, Indiana.
- Coordinates: 38°52′26″N 87°26′35″W
- Country: United States
- State: Indiana
- County: Knox
- Township: Busseron
- Incorporated: 1909

Area
  - Total: 0.27 sq mi (0.70 km^{2})
  - Land: 0.27 sq mi (0.70 km^{2})
  - Water: 0 sq mi (0.00 km^{2})
- Elevation: 472 ft (144 m)

Population (2020)
  - Total: 581
  - Density: 2,137.4/sq mi (825.26/km^{2})
- Time zone: UTC−5 (Eastern (EST))
  - Summer (DST): UTC−4 (Eastern (EDT))
- ZIP Code: 47561
- Area code: 812
- FIPS code: 18-55800
- GNIS feature ID: 2396827
- Website: http://oaktownindiana.org/index.html

Oaktown is a town in Busseron Township, Knox County, Indiana. The population was 581 at the 2020 census.

== History ==
Oaktown was laid out in 1867. The community was formally incorporated in 1909 and became a regional center of commerce and trade.

== Geography ==
According to the 2010 census, Oaktown has a total area of 0.27 square miles (0.70 km^{2}), all land.

== Demographics ==
Historical population
Census	Pop.	Note	%±
1910	608		—
1920	779		28.1%
1930	771		−1.0%
1940	793		2.9%
1950	763		−3.8%
1960	798		4.6%
1970	726		−9.0%
1980	776		6.9%
1990	655		−15.6%
2000	633		−3.4%
2010	608		−3.9%
2020	581		−4.4%
U.S. Decennial Census

=== 2010 census ===
As of the census of 2010, there were 608 people, 256 households, and 154 families living in the town. The population density was 2,251.9 inhabitants per square mile (869.5/km^{2}). There were 292 housing units at an average density of 1,081.5 per square mile (417.6/km^{2}). The racial makeup of the town was 98.0% White, 0.7% African American, 0.5% Asian, and 0.8% from two or more races. Hispanic or Latino of any race were 2.3% of the population.

There were 256 households, of which 30.5% had children under the age of 18 living with them, 44.5% were married couples living together, 12.5% had a female householder with no husband present, 3.1% had a male householder with no wife present, and 39.8% were non-families. Of all households, 34.8% were made up of individuals, and 16.4% had someone living alone who was 65 years of age or older. The average household size was 2.25 and the average family size was 2.88.

The median age in the town was 42.7 years. 20.6% of residents were under the age of 18; 9.2% were between the ages of 18 and 24; 23% were from 25 to 44; 25% were from 45 to 64; and 22% were 65 years of age or older. The gender makeup of the town was 45.1% male and 54.9% female.

=== 2000 census ===
As of the census of 2000, there were 633 people, 252 households, and 169 families living in the town. The population density was 2,110 inhabitants per square mile (810/km^{2}). The racial makeup of the town was 99.8% White, 0.2% Native American, 0.2% Asian, 0.2% from other races, and 0.2% from two or more races. Hispanic or Latino of any race were 1.7% of the population.

There were 252 households, out of which 27.4% had children under the age of 18 living with them, 53.2% were married couples living together, 11.1% had a female householder with no husband present, and 32.9% were non-families. Of all households, 27.8% were made up of individuals, and 15.5% had someone living alone who was 65 years of age or older. The average household size was 2.35 and the average family size was 2.82.

In the town, the population was spread out, with 21.6% under the age of 18, 7.7% from 18 to 24, 24.3% from 25 to 44, 23.1% from 45 to 64, and 23.2% who were 65 years of age or older. The median age was 42 years. For every 100 females, there were 91.8 males. For every 100 females age 18 and over, there were 87.9 males.

The median income for a household in the town was $30,481, and the median income for a family was $37,222. Males had a median income of $30,000 versus $18,636 for females. The per capita income for the town was $14,417. About 13.3% of families and 17.6% of the population were below the poverty line, including 17.8% of those under age 18 and 19.3% of those age 65 or over.

== Education ==
It is in the North Knox School Corporation.

== Notable residents ==
- Dan Beery, 2004 Summer Olympics Men's Eight Rowing Gold Medalist
- James Polk (1937–2021), Pulitzer Prize–winning investigative journalist
