= Washington Township, Knox County, Indiana =

Washington Township
- Township
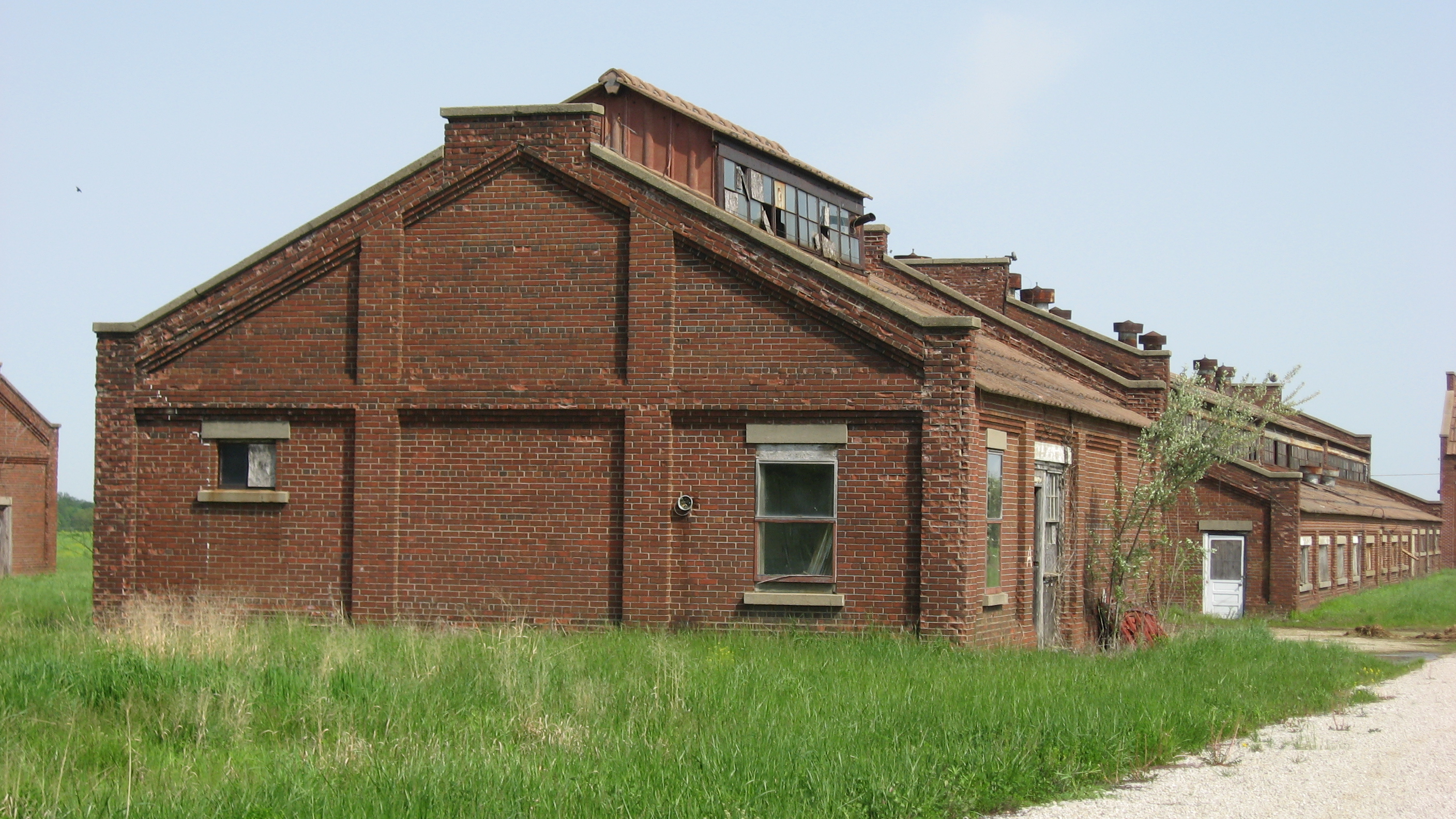
- Buildings at the Enoco Coal Mine, a historic site in the township

- Coordinates: 38°45′49″N 87°23′50″W
- Country: United States
- State: Indiana
- County: Knox

Government
  - Type: Indiana township

Area
  - Total: 49.09 sq mi (127.1 km^{2})
  - Land: 48.84 sq mi (126.5 km^{2})
  - Water: 0.24 sq mi (0.62 km^{2})
- Elevation: 554 ft (169 m)

Population (2020)
  - Total: 2,256
  - Density: 46.19/sq mi (17.83/km^{2})
- FIPS code: 18-80738
- GNIS feature ID: 454002

Washington Township is one of ten townships in Knox County, Indiana. As of the 2020 census, its population was 2,256 (slightly down from 2,286 at 2010) and it contained 1,040 housing units. It contains the census-designated place of Ragsdale.

Historical population
Census	Pop.	Note	%±
1890	1,556		—
1900	1,480		−4.9%
1910	1,596		7.8%
1920	3,207		100.9%
1930	2,853		−11.0%
1940	2,691		−5.7%
1950	2,621		−2.6%
1960	2,267		−13.5%
1970	2,324		2.5%
1980	2,316		−0.3%
1990	2,387		3.1%
2000	2,320		−2.8%
2010	2,286		−1.5%
2020	2,256		−1.3%
Source: US Decennial Census

== History ==
It is named for George Washington.

Enoco Coal Mine was added to the National Register of Historic Places in 2010.

== Geography ==
According to the 2010 census, the township has a total area of 49.09 square miles (127.1 km^{2}), of which 48.84 square miles (126.5 km^{2}) (or 99.49%) is land and 0.24 square miles (0.62 km^{2}) (or 0.49%) is water.

== Education ==
It is in the North Knox School Corporation.
