= Emison, Indiana =

- Census-designated place
- Location in Knox County, Indiana

- Location within Indiana Location within the United States
- Coordinates: 38°47′57″N 87°27′37″W
- Country: United States
- State: Indiana
- County: Knox
- Township: Busseron
- Named after: Samuel A. Emison

Area
  - Total: 1.58 sq mi (4.09 km^{2})
  - Land: 1.57 sq mi (4.07 km^{2})
  - Water: 0.0077 sq mi (0.02 km^{2})
- Elevation: 449 ft (137 m)

Population (2020)
  - Total: 145
  - Density: 92.4/sq mi (35.66/km^{2})
- Time zone: UTC-5 (EST)
  - Summer (DST): UTC-4 (EDT)
- ZIP code: 47561
- Area code: 812
- FIPS code: 18-21124
- GNIS feature ID: 2583451

Emison is an unincorporated community and census-designated place (CDP) in Busseron Township, Knox County, Indiana. As of the 2020 census, Emison had a population of 145.

== History ==
Emison was laid out in 1867 for Samuel A. Emison. The Emison post office was discontinued in 1994.

== Geography ==
Emison is located in northwestern Knox County. U.S. Routes 41 and 150, a four-lane highway, passes through the east side of the community, leading south 10 miles (16 km) to Vincennes, the county seat, and north 48 miles (77 km) to Terre Haute. Indiana State Road 550 leads southeast from Emison 4 miles (6 km) to Bruceville.

According to the U.S. Census Bureau, the Emison CDP has a total area of 1.6 square miles (4.1 km^{2}), of which 0.01 square miles (0.02 km^{2}), or 0.58%, are water.

== Demographics ==
Historical population
| Census | Pop. | Note | %± |
|---|---|---|---|
| 2020 | 145 | | — |
U.S. Decennial Census

== Education ==
It is in the North Knox School Corporation.
