= Bicknell, Indiana =

- City
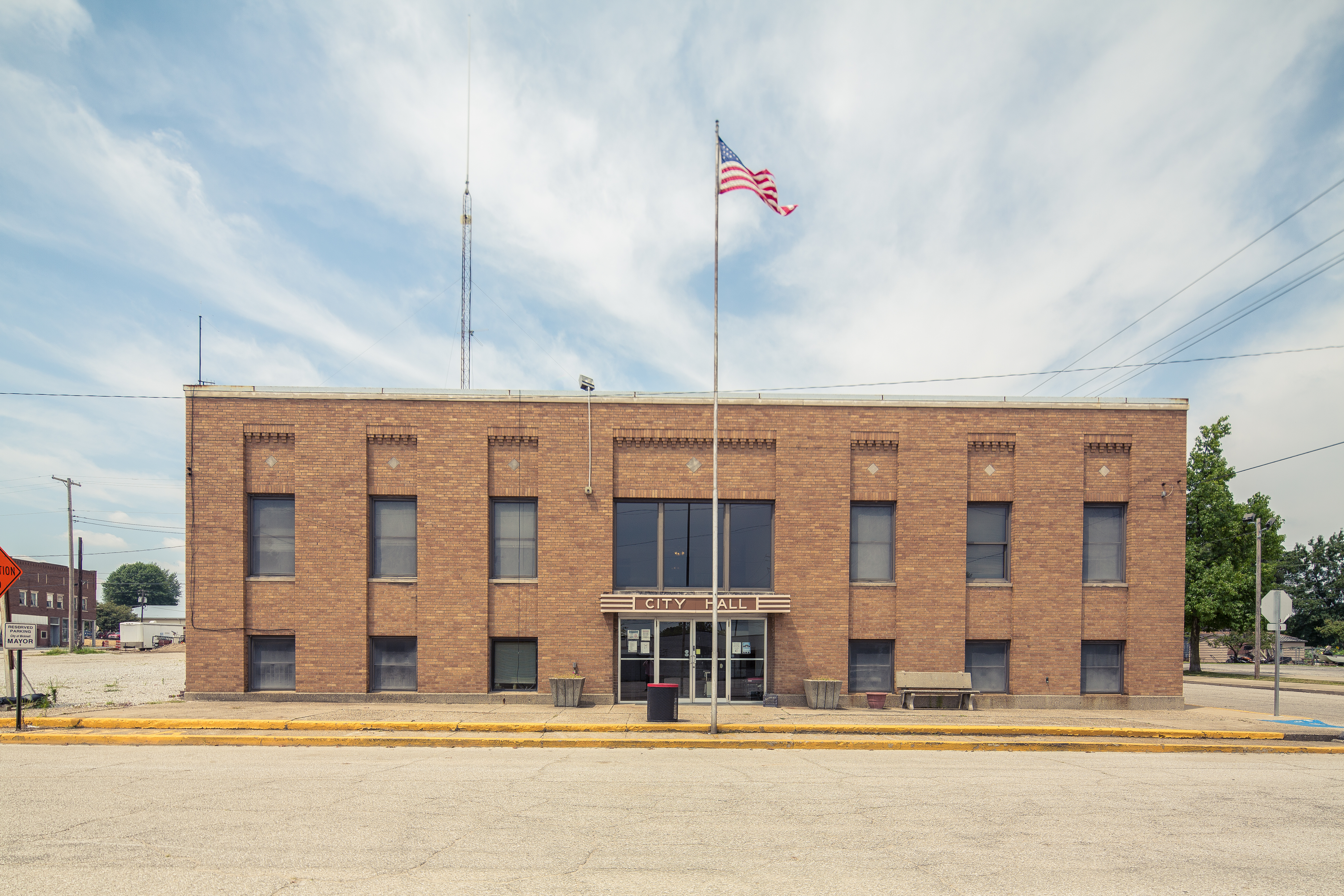

- Seal

- Location of Bicknell in Knox County, Indiana.
- Coordinates: 38°46′28″N 87°18′28″W
- Country: United States
- State: Indiana
- County: Knox
- Townships: Vigo, Washington
- Founded: 1869
- Incorporated: 1907

Government
  - Mayor: Thomas Estabrook

Area
  - Total: 1.35 sq mi (3.50 km^{2})
  - Land: 1.35 sq mi (3.50 km^{2})
  - Water: 0 sq mi (0.00 km^{2})
- Elevation: 512 ft (156 m)

Population (2021)
  - Total: 3,029
  - Density: 2,238.7/sq mi (864.38/km^{2})
- Time zone: UTC-5 (EST)
  - Summer (DST): UTC-4 (EDT)
- ZIP code: 47512
- Area code: 812, 930
- FIPS code: 18-05176
- GNIS ID: 2394162
- Website: bicknell.in.gov

Bicknell is a city in Knox County, Indiana, United States. The population was 3,092 at the 2020 census.

== History ==
Bicknell was laid out in 1869 by John Bicknell, and named for him. In 1907, Bicknell was incorporated as a town.

== Geography ==
Bicknell is located in northeastern Knox County.

According to the 2010 census, Bicknell has a total area of 1.35 square miles (3.50 km^{2}), all land.

=== Climate ===
The climate in this area is characterized by hot, humid summers and generally mild to cool winters. According to the Köppen Climate Classification system, Bicknell has a humid subtropical climate, abbreviated "Cfa" on climate maps.

== Demographics ==
Historical population
Census	Pop.	Note	%±
1880	298		—
1910	2,794		—
1920	7,635		173.3%
1930	5,212		−31.7%
1940	5,110		−2.0%
1950	4,572		−10.5%
1960	3,878		−15.2%
1970	3,717		−4.2%
1980	4,713		26.8%
1990	3,357		−28.8%
2000	3,378		0.6%
2010	2,915		−13.7%
2020	3,029		3.9%
U.S. Decennial Census

=== 2020 census ===
As of the 2020 census, Bicknell had a population of 3,029. The median age was 39.1 years. 25.9% of residents were under the age of 18 and 17.3% of residents were 65 years of age or older. For every 100 females there were 96.1 males, and for every 100 females age 18 and over there were 94.5 males age 18 and over.

0.0% of residents lived in urban areas, while 100.0% lived in rural areas.

There were 1,278 households in Bicknell, of which 30.1% had children under the age of 18 living in them. Of all households, 39.4% were married-couple households, 22.7% were households with a male householder and no spouse or partner present, and 29.8% were households with a female householder and no spouse or partner present. About 33.7% of all households were made up of individuals and 16.8% had someone living alone who was 65 years of age or older.

There were 1,583 housing units, of which 19.3% were vacant. The homeowner vacancy rate was 1.8% and the rental vacancy rate was 8.3%.

Racial composition as of the 2020 census
Race	Number	Percent
White	2,836	93.6%
Black or African American	19	0.6%
American Indian and Alaska Native	14	0.5%
Asian	9	0.3%
Native Hawaiian and Other Pacific Islander	1	0.0%
Some other race	38	1.3%
Two or more races	112	3.7%
Hispanic or Latino (of any race)	68	2.2%

=== 2010 census ===
As of the 2010 census, there were 2,915 people, 1,187 households, and 737 families living in the city. The population density was 2,159.3 inhabitants per square mile (833.7/km^{2}). There were 1,501 housing units at an average density of 1,111.9 per square mile (429.3/km^{2}). The racial makeup of the city was 97.6% White, 0.5% African American, 0.2% Native American, 0.2% Asian, 0.4% from other races, and 1.0% from two or more races. Hispanic or Latino of any race were 1.9% of the population.

There were 1,187 households, of which 31.1% had children under the age of 18 living with them, 44.5% were married couples living together, 12.6% had a female householder with no husband present, 5.1% had a male householder with no wife present, and 37.9% were non-families. 31.9% of all households were made up of individuals, and 14.5% had someone living alone who was 65 years of age or older. The average household size was 2.45 and the average family size was 3.10.

The median age in the city was 38.7 years. 25.1% of residents were under the age of 18; 9.3% were between the ages of 18 and 24; 23% were from 25 to 44; 26.3% were from 45 to 64; and 16.4% were 65 years of age or older. The gender makeup of the city was 48.7% male and 51.3% female.

=== 2000 census ===
As of the 2000 census, there were 3,378 people, 2,156 households, and 1,913 families living in the city. The population density was 2,216.8 inhabitants per square mile (855.9/km^{2}). There were 1,581 housing units at an average density of 1,037.5 per square mile (400.6/km^{2}). The racial makeup of the city was 98.13% White, 0.4% African American, 0.2% Native American, 0.15% Asian, 0.12% Pacific Islander, 0.06% from other races, and 0.89% from two or more races. Hispanic or Latino of any race were 0.25% of the population.

There were 1,395 households, out of which 29.9% had children under the age of 18 living with them, 49.2% were married couples living together, 12.6% had a female householder with no husband present, and 34.7% were non-families. 30.5% of all households were made up of individuals, and 16.2% had someone living alone who was 65 years of age or older. The average household size was 2.38 and the average family size was 2.95.

In the city, the population was spread out, with 25.3% under the age of 18, 8.7% from 18 to 24, 25.5% from 25 to 44, 23.1% from 45 to 64, and 17.4% who were 65 years of age or older. The median age was 38 years. For every 100 females, there were 89.9 males. For every 100 females age 18 and over, there were 84.5 males.

The median income for a household in the city was $23,046, and the median income for a family was $32,935. Males had a median income of $31,487 versus $58,162 for females. The per capita income for the city was $13,027. About 18.5% of families and 26.3% of the population were below the poverty line, including 38.4% of those under age 18 and 21.0% of those age 65 or over. The median age was 38.7

== Government ==
Bicknell has a mayor-council system of government; both the mayor and city council serve four-year terms. There are five councilmen on the council, with four from districts and one at-large member.

== Education ==
It is in the North Knox School Corporation.

Bicknell has a public library, a branch of the Bicknell-Vigo Township Public Library.

== Notable people ==
- Norman Arterburn, Justice of the Indiana Supreme Court
- Joseph Barr, former Congressman and Secretary of the Treasury during the Johnson administration
- Tricia Cullop, current head coach of the Toledo Rockets women's basketball team
- Herdis McCrary, fullback for 1929 NFL Champion Green Bay Packers
- John McNaughton, Secretary of the Navy designate, Johnson administration
- Jones Osborn, Arizona newspaper editor and state legislator
