= Sandborn, Indiana =

- Town
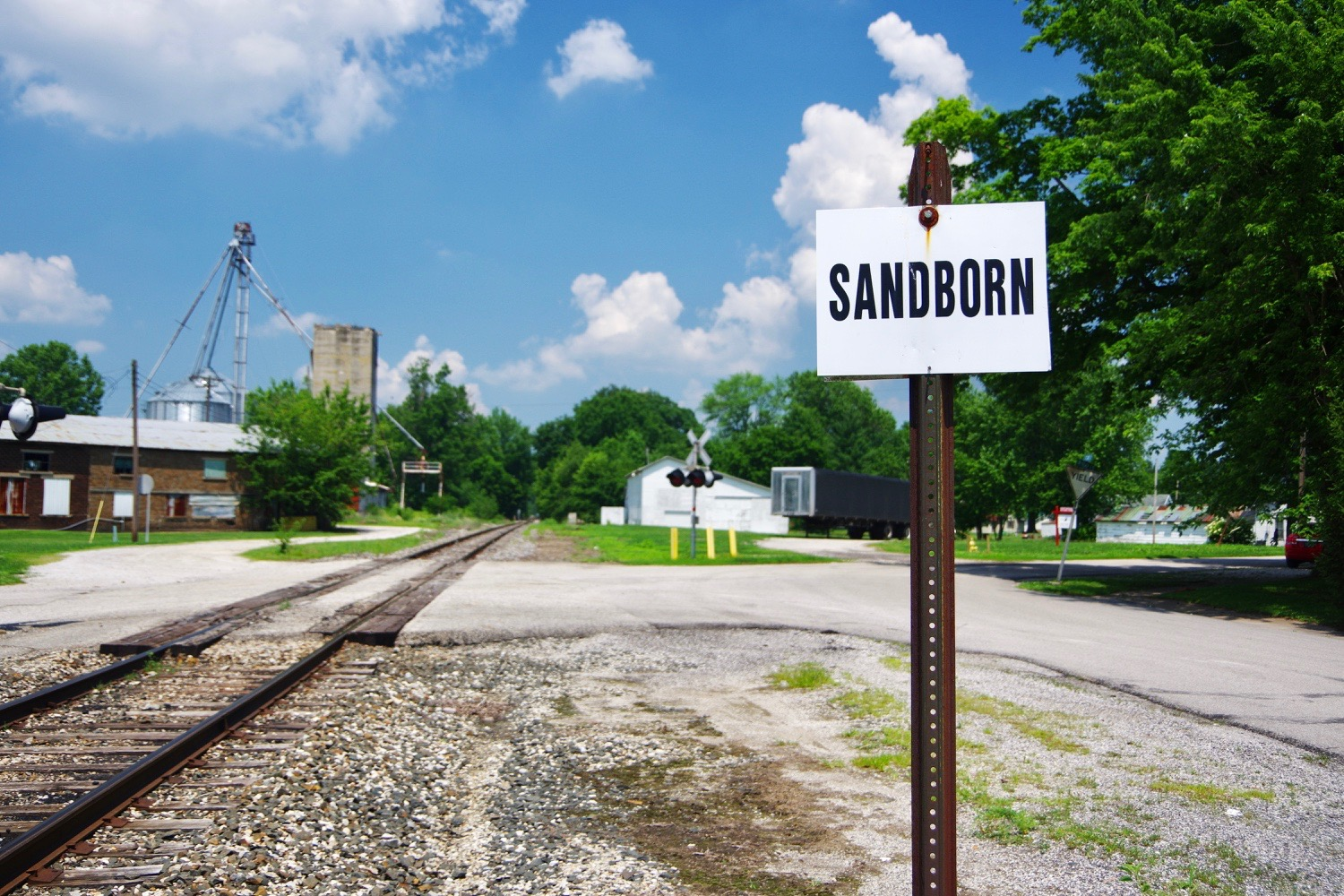
- Sandborn

- Location of Sandborn in Knox County, Indiana.
- Coordinates: 38°53′48″N 87°11′05″W
- Country: United States
- State: Indiana
- County: Knox
- Township: Vigo

Area
  - Total: 0.39 sq mi (1.01 km^{2})
  - Land: 0.39 sq mi (1.01 km^{2})
  - Water: 0 sq mi (0.00 km^{2})
- Elevation: 476 ft (145 m)

Population (2020)
  - Total: 359
  - Density: 919.9/sq mi (355.17/km^{2})
- Time zone: UTC-5 (EST)
  - Summer (DST): UTC-4 (EDT)
- ZIP code: 47578
- Area code: 812
- FIPS code: 18-67698
- GNIS feature ID: 2396904
- Website: www.in.gov/towns/sandborn/

Sandborn is a town in Vigo Township, Knox County, Indiana, United States. The population was 359 at the 2020 census. It is the home of the annual Black Creek Festival.

== History ==
Sandborn was laid out in 1868. It was named for a railroad official. The Sandborn post office was established in 1869.

== Geography ==
Sandborn lies in northeastern Knox County, just south of the Knox-Greene county line. Indiana State Road 59 traverses Sandborn, connecting the town with Linton and the Greene-Sullivan State Forest to the north. State Road 67 passes through the northwestern limits of Sandborn, connecting the town with the Vincennes area to the southwest.

According to the 2010 census, Sandborn has a total area of 0.39 square miles (1.01 km^{2}), all land.

== Demographics ==
Historical population
Census	Pop.	Note	%±
1880	252		—
1910	445		—
1920	530		19.1%
1930	641		20.9%
1940	602		−6.1%
1950	572		−5.0%
1960	547		−4.4%
1970	528		−3.5%
1980	576		9.1%
1990	455		−21.0%
2000	451		−0.9%
2010	415		−8.0%
2020	359		−13.5%
U.S. Decennial Census

=== 2010 census ===
As of the census of 2010, there were 415 people, 174 households, and 114 families living in the town. The population density was 1,064.1 inhabitants per square mile (410.9/km^{2}). There were 202 housing units at an average density of 517.9 per square mile (200.0/km^{2}). The racial makeup of the town was 98.6% White, 0.2% African American, 1.0% Native American, and 0.2% from other races. Hispanic or Latino of any race were 0.7% of the population.

There were 174 households, of which 29.9% had children under the age of 18 living with them, 55.7% were married couples living together, 8.0% had a female householder with no husband present, 1.7% had a male householder with no wife present, and 34.5% were non-families. 28.7% of all households were made up of individuals, and 12.6% had someone living alone who was 65 years of age or older. The average household size was 2.39 and the average family size was 2.98.

The median age in the town was 42.1 years. 22.7% of residents were under the age of 18; 7.8% were between the ages of 18 and 24; 23.9% were from 25 to 44; 28.8% were from 45 to 64; and 16.9% were 65 years of age or older. The gender makeup of the town was 48.0% male and 52.0% female.

=== 2000 census ===
As of the census of 2000, there were 451 people, 193 households, and 132 families living in the town. The population density was 1,127.5 inhabitants per square mile (435.3/km^{2}). There were 214 housing units at an average density of 535.0 per square mile (206.6/km^{2}). The racial makeup of the town was 97.34% White, 0.44% African American, 1.11% Native American, and 1.11% from two or more races. Hispanic or Latino of any race were 0.44% of the population.

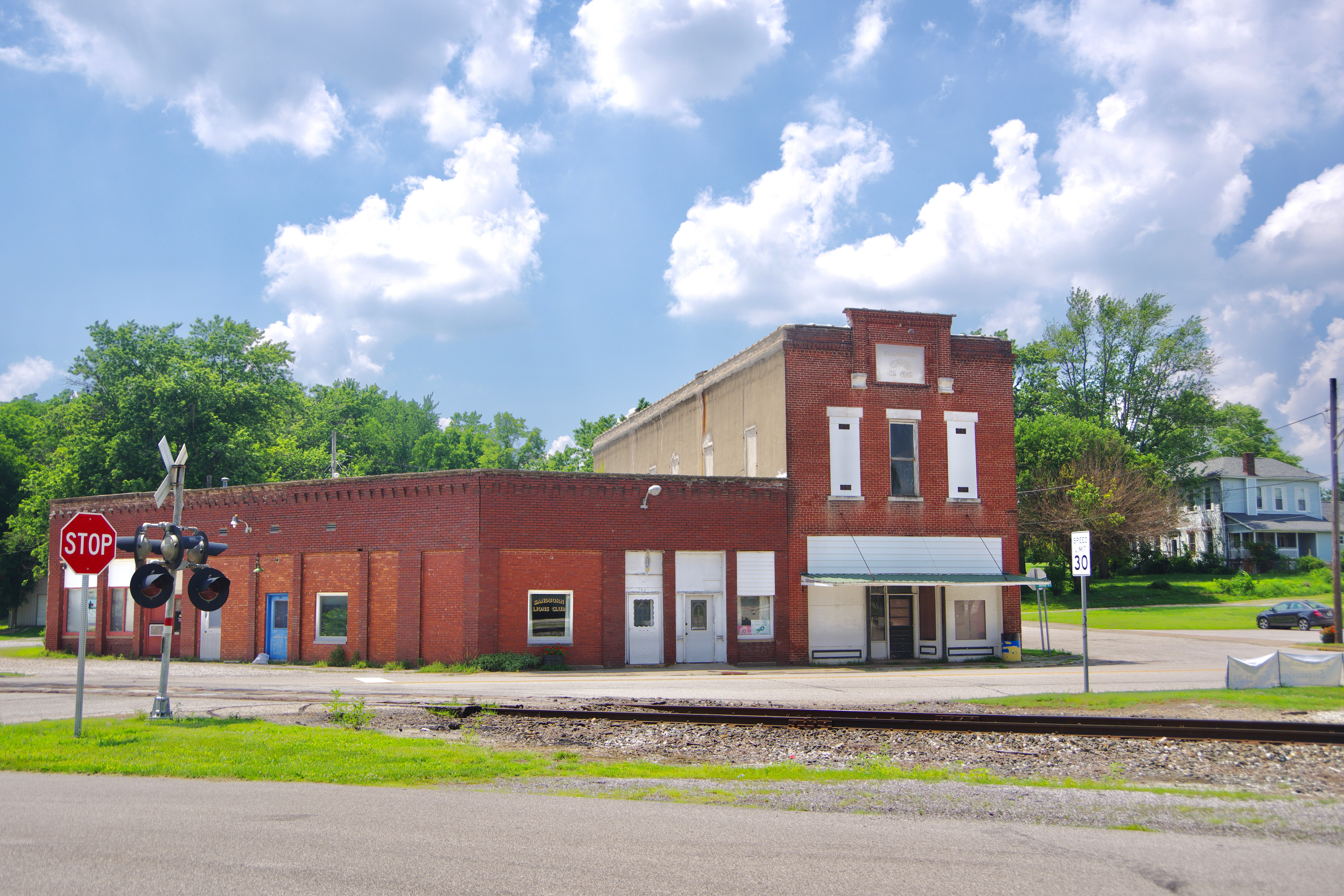
Block of old buildings along Anderson Street (SR 59)

There were 193 households, out of which 29.0% had children under the age of 18 living with them, 62.2% were married couples living together, 5.7% had a female householder with no husband present, and 31.1% were non-families. 29.0% of all households were made up of individuals, and 16.1% had someone living alone who was 65 years of age or older. The average household size was 2.34 and the average family size was 2.88.

In the town, the population was spread out, with 23.1% under the age of 18, 6.0% from 18 to 24, 25.9% from 25 to 44, 26.2% from 45 to 64, and 18.8% who were 65 years of age or older. The median age was 41 years. For every 100 females, there were 93.6 males. For every 100 females age 18 and over, there were 87.6 males.

The median income for a household in the town was $31,000, and the median income for a family was $47,031. Males had a median income of $38,594 versus $25,417 for females. The per capita income for the town was $17,878. About 7.9% of families and 11.5% of the population were below the poverty line, including 11.2% of those under age 18 and 6.1% of those age 65 or over.

== Education ==
It is in the North Knox School Corporation.

Sandborn has a public library, a branch of the Bicknell-Vigo Township Public Library.

== Notable people ==
- John R. Gregg – 2012 and 2016 Democratic nominee for Governor of Indiana
- Grover Lowdermilk – Major League baseball pitcher (1909–1920)
- Lou Lowdermilk – Major League baseball pitcher (1911–1912)
