= Vigo Township, Knox County, Indiana =

Vigo Township
- Township
- Coordinates: 38°50′17″N 87°14′17″W
- Country: United States
- State: Indiana
- County: Knox

Government
  - Type: Indiana township

Area
  - Total: 67.11 sq mi (173.8 km^{2})
  - Land: 66.13 sq mi (171.3 km^{2})
  - Water: 0.97 sq mi (2.5 km^{2})
- Elevation: 463 ft (141 m)

Population (2020)
  - Total: 4,083
  - Density: 61.74/sq mi (23.84/km^{2})
- FIPS code: 18-79118
- GNIS feature ID: 453960

Vigo Township is one of ten townships in Knox County, Indiana. As of the 2020 census, its population was 4,083 (up from 4,031 at 2010) and it contained 2,095 housing units. It contains the census-designated place of Westphalia.

Historical population
Census	Pop.	Note	%±
1890	3,428		—
1900	4,095		19.5%
1910	5,860		43.1%
1920	10,385		77.2%
1930	7,916		−23.8%
1940	7,808		−1.4%
1950	7,036		−9.9%
1960	6,067		−13.8%
1970	5,635		−7.1%
1980	5,513		−2.2%
1990	4,666		−15.4%
2000	4,798		2.8%
2010	4,031		−16.0%
2020	4,083		1.3%
Source: US Decennial Census

== History ==
Vigo Township was established in 1837. It was named for Col. François Vigo.

== Geography ==
According to the 2010 census, the township has a total area of 67.11 square miles (173.8 km^{2}), of which 66.13 square miles (171.3 km^{2}) (or 98.54%) is land and 0.97 square miles (2.5 km^{2}) (or 1.45%) is water.

== Education ==
It is in the North Knox School Corporation.

Vigo Township residents may obtain a free library card from the Bicknell-Vigo Township Public Library.
