= Bruceville, Indiana =

- Town
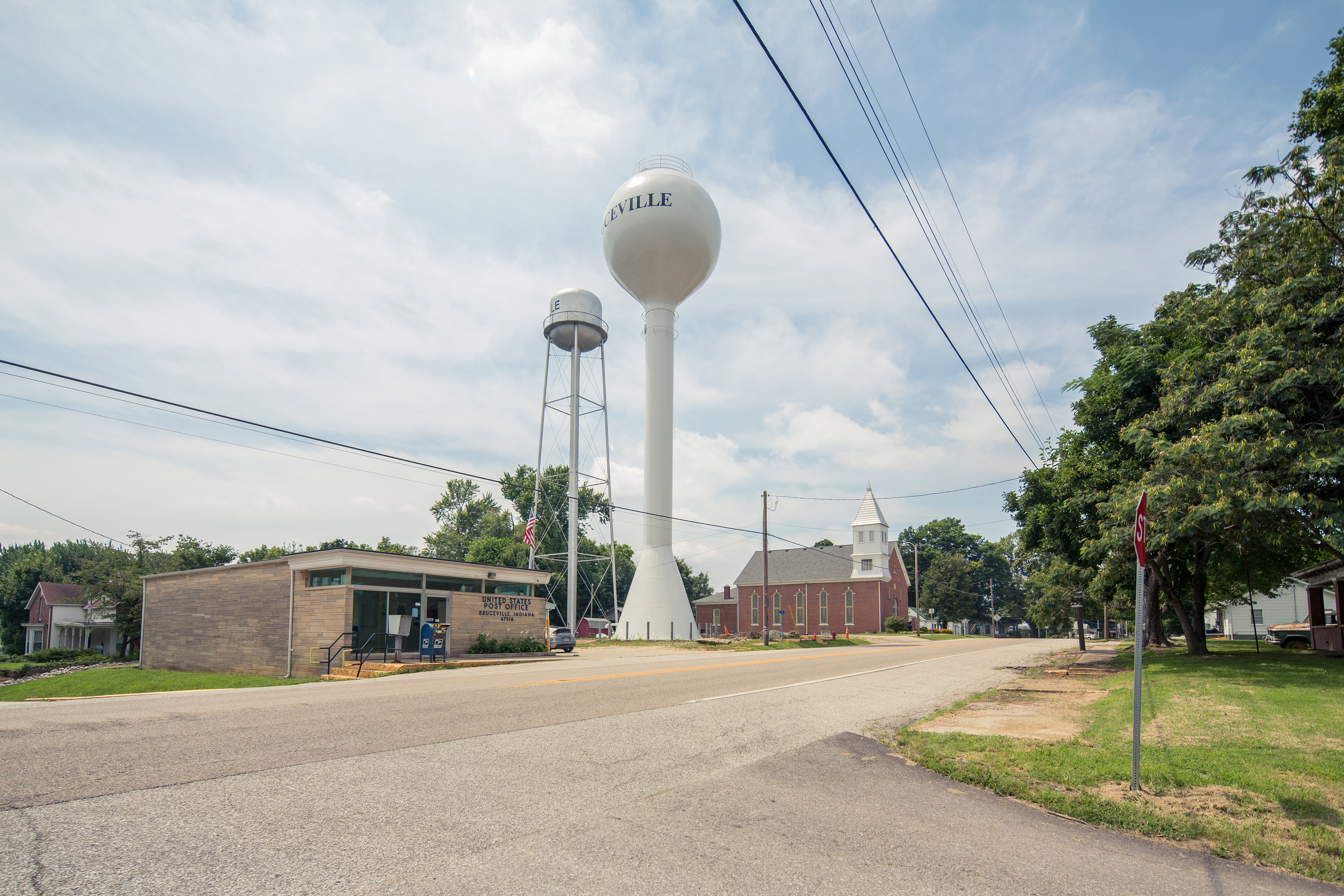

- Location of Bruceville in Knox County, Indiana.
- Coordinates: 38°45′25″N 87°24′54″W
- Country: United States
- State: Indiana
- County: Knox
- Township: Washington

Area
  - Total: 0.34 sq mi (0.89 km^{2})
  - Land: 0.34 sq mi (0.89 km^{2})
  - Water: 0 sq mi (0.00 km^{2})
- Elevation: 538 ft (164 m)

Population (2020)
  - Total: 450
  - Density: 1,312.5/sq mi (506.74/km^{2})
- Time zone: UTC-5 (EST)
  - Summer (DST): UTC-4 (EDT)
- ZIP code: 47516
- Area codes: 812, 930
- FIPS code: 18-08578
- GNIS feature ID: 2396613
- Website: brucevilleindiana.org

Bruceville is a town in Washington Township, Knox County, Indiana, United States. The population was 450 at the 2020 census.

== Geography ==
According to the 2010 census, Bruceville has a total area of 0.34 square miles (0.88 km^{2}), all land.

=== Climate ===
The climate in this area is characterized by hot, humid summers and generally mild to cool winters. According to the Köppen Climate Classification system, Bruceville has a humid subtropical climate, abbreviated "Cfa" on climate maps.

== History ==
Bruceville was named for the Bruce family. William Bruce (1776–1853) settled here in 1805. Bruce led the local militia during Tecumseh's War in 1811. The streets of the town were laid out in 1829.

Abraham Lincoln visited Bruceville in October 1844 and gave a speech in support of Henry Clay.

== Demographics ==
Historical population
Census	Pop.	Note	%±
1880	258		—
1960	623		—
1970	627		0.6%
1980	646		3.0%
1990	471		−27.1%
2000	469		−0.4%
2010	478		1.9%
2020	450		−5.9%
U.S. Decennial Census

=== 2010 census ===
As of the census of 2010, there were 478 people, 193 households, and 125 families living in the town. The population density was 1,405.9 inhabitants per square mile (542.8/km^{2}). There were 218 housing units at an average density of 641.2 per square mile (247.6/km^{2}). The racial makeup of the town was 95.6% White, 0.2% African American, 0.4% Native American, 1.0% Asian, 1.5% from other races, and 1.3% from two or more races. Hispanic or Latino of any race were 2.1% of the population.

There were 193 households, of which 32.1% had children under the age of 18 living with them, 48.7% were married couples living together, 13.0% had a female householder with no husband present, 3.1% had a male householder with no wife present, and 35.2% were non-families. 32.1% of all households were made up of individuals, and 10.4% had someone living alone who was 65 years of age or older. The average household size was 2.48 and the average family size was 3.16.

The median age in the town was 35.4 years. 26.8% of residents were under the age of 18; 10% were between the ages of 18 and 24; 25% were from 25 to 44; 27.8% were from 45 to 64; and 10.5% were 65 years of age or older. The gender makeup of the town was 47.9% male and 52.1% female.

=== 2000 census ===
As of the census of 2000, there were 469 people, 199 households, and 141 families living in the town. The population density was 1,597.2 inhabitants per square mile (616.7/km^{2}). There were 221 housing units at an average density of 752.6 per square mile (290.6/km^{2}). The racial makeup of the town was 98.51% White, 0.21% African American, 0.21% Native American, 0.21% from other races, and 0.85% from two or more races. Hispanic or Latino of any race were 0.43% of the population.

There were 199 households, out of which 33.2% had children under the age of 18 living with them, 56.8% were married couples living together, 11.6% had a female householder with no husband present, and 29.1% were non-families. 26.6% of all households were made up of individuals, and 13.1% had someone living alone who was 65 years of age or older. The average household size was 2.36 and the average family size was 2.87.

In the town, the population was spread out, with 25.8% under the age of 18, 8.3% from 18 to 24, 28.6% from 25 to 44, 22.2% from 45 to 64, and 15.1% who were 65 years of age or older. The median age was 37 years. For every 100 females, there were 94.6 males. For every 100 females age 18 and over, there were 91.2 males.

The median income for a household in the town was $24,028, and the median income for a family was $33,036. Males had a median income of $27,292 versus $17,857 for females. The per capita income for the town was $13,829. About 12.6% of families and 14.0% of the population were below the poverty line, including 16.3% of those under age 18 and 11.0% of those age 65 or over.

== Education ==
It is in the North Knox School Corporation.
