= National Register of Historic Places listings in Knox County, Indiana =

Location of Knox County in Indiana

This is a list of the National Register of Historic Places listings in Knox County, Indiana.

This is intended to be a complete list of the properties and districts on the National Register of Historic Places in Knox County, Indiana, United States. Latitude and longitude coordinates are provided for many National Register properties and districts; these locations may be seen together in a map.

There are 21 properties and districts listed on the National Register in the county, including one National Historic Landmark. Another two properties were once listed but have been removed.

Properties and districts located in incorporated areas display the name of the municipality, while properties and districts in unincorporated areas display the name of their civil township. Properties and districts split between multiple jurisdictions display the names of all jurisdictions.

This National Park Service list is complete through NPS recent listings posted November 13, 2025.

== Current listings ==
	Name on the Register	Image	Date listed	Location	City or town	Description
1	County Bridge No. 45	County Bridge No. 45	September 20, 2006 (#06000856)	Carries County Road 229 over the White River, northeast of Wheatland; 38°40′46″N 87°16′23″W	Steen Township	Extends into Daviess County
2	Enoco Coal Mine	Enoco Coal Mine	December 28, 2010 (#10001100)	Northern side of Grundman Rd., 1.5 miles south of Bruceville; 38°43′46″N 87°24′50″W	Washington Township	
3	Fort Knox II Site	Fort Knox II Site	March 24, 1982 (#82000045)	3 miles north of downtown Vincennes; 38°43′27″N 87°30′24″W	Vincennes	
4	George Rogers Clark National Historical Park	George Rogers Clark National Historical Park	October 15, 1966 (#66000007)	401 S. 2nd St., south of U.S. Route 50; 38°40′44″N 87°32′07″W	Vincennes	
5	Gregg Park	Gregg Park	September 25, 2013 (#13000756)	2204 Washington Ave. 38°41′06″N 87°30′08″W	Vincennes	
6	Hack and Simon Office Building	Hack and Simon Office Building	March 26, 2003 (#03000141)	1101 N. 3rd St. 38°41′04″N 87°31′14″W	Vincennes	
7	William Henry Harrison Home	William Henry Harrison Home	October 15, 1966 (#66000018)	3 W. Scott St. 38°41′08″N 87°31′34″W	Vincennes	
8	Kimmell Park	Kimmell Park	September 25, 2013 (#13000757)	2014 Oliphant Dr. 38°41′48″N 87°31′04″W	Vincennes	
9	Kixmiller's Store	Kixmiller's Store	December 8, 1978 (#78000035)	Carlise and Indianapolis Sts. at Freelandville; 38°51′54″N 87°18′21″W	Widner Township	
10	Knox County Poor Asylum		December 3, 2018 (#100003183)	2008 S. Hart Street Rd. 38°38′48″N 87°29′14″W	Palmyra Township	
11	Mont Clair		December 27, 2016 (#16000904)	3890 E. Johnson Farm Rd. 38°39′33″N 87°28′11″W	Vincennes Township	
12	Andrew Nicholson Farmstead	Andrew Nicholson Farmstead	June 17, 2005 (#05000606)	12095 E. State Road 550, northwest of Wheatland; 38°40′08″N 87°19′00″W	Steen Township	
13	Old Cathedral Complex	Old Cathedral Complex	August 17, 1976 (#76000025)	205 Church St. 38°40′44″N 87°32′03″W	Vincennes	
14	Old State Bank	Old State Bank	October 9, 1974 (#74000021)	N. 2nd St. 38°40′50″N 87°31′52″W	Vincennes	
15	Pyramid Mound (12k14)	Pyramid Mound (12k14)	May 12, 1975 (#75000023)	Southern side of Wabash Avenue, southeast of central Vincennes; 38°40′14″N 87°30′22″W	Vincennes	Also known as "Lower Sugarloaf Mound"
16	Shadowwood	Shadowwood	June 6, 2001 (#01000618)	6451 E. Wheatland Rd., east of Vincennes; 38°41′59″N 87°25′06″W	Palmyra Township	
17	Alfred Simonson House	Alfred Simonson House	December 24, 2009 (#09001131)	207 Shipping St. 38°48′43″N 87°14′55″W	Edwardsport	
18	Simpson Nursery Historic District		May 24, 2021 (#100006564)	1502, 1504, 1512 Old Wheatland Rd. 38°41′14″N 87°28′41″W	Vincennes vicinity	
19	Territorial Capitol of Former Indiana Territory	Territorial Capitol of Former Indiana Territory	July 2, 1973 (#73000021)	Bounded by Harrison, 1st, Scott, and Park Sts. 38°41′07″N 87°31′31″W	Vincennes	
20	Vincennes Fortnightly Club	Vincennes Fortnightly Club	September 22, 2000 (#00001133)	421 N. 6th St. 38°40′45″N 87°31′31″W	Vincennes	
21	Vincennes Historic District	Vincennes Historic District	December 31, 1974 (#74000022)	Vincennes; 38°40′41″N 87°31′43″W	Vincennes	

== Former listings ==
	Name on the Register	Image	Date listed	Date removed	Location	City or town	Description
1	Ebner-Free House		March 21, 1985 (#85000601)	June 2, 1999	120 Locust	Vincennes	Moved to a new location in 1999
2	Rose Hill Farmstead	Rose Hill Farmstead	March 3, 1995 (#95000202)	June 15, 2012	Old Louisville Rd, 0.25 miles north of its junction with Old Wheatland Rd., and east of Vincennes; 38°42′01″N 87°25′11″W	Palmyra Township	Demolished in 2011

== See also ==
- List of National Historic Landmarks in Indiana
- National Register of Historic Places listings in Indiana
- Listings in neighboring counties: Crawford (IL), Daviess, Gibson, Greene, Lawrence (IL), Pike, Sullivan, Wabash (IL)
- List of Indiana state historical markers in Knox County
