= Vincennes (disambiguation) =

Vincennes may refer to:

- Vincennes, a commune in the Val-de-Marne département, Paris, France
  - Bois de Vincennes, a park in Paris
  - Paris 8 University, also known as "University of Vincennes in Saint-Denis"
- Vincennes, Indiana, United States
  - Vincennes Township, Knox County, Indiana
  - Vincennes University
  - Siege of Fort Vincennes during the American Revolutionary War
- Forts of Vincennes, Indiana, 18th century military outposts of the French province of Louisiana
- USS Vincennes, any of a number of U.S. Navy ships

People

- Jean-Baptiste Bissot, Sieur de Vincennes (1668–1719), Canadian soldier and explorer of North America
- François-Marie Bissot, Sieur de Vincennes (1700–1736), Canadian soldier and explorer of North America
