= WFML =

Radio station in Vincennes, Indiana

- Vincennes, Indiana; United States
- Frequency: 96.7 MHz
- Branding: 96.7 The Rock

Programming
- Format: Mainstream rock
- Affiliations: ABC News Radio; Network Indiana; White Sox Radio Network; Learfield-IMG Purdue Network

Ownership
- Owner: The Vincennes University Foundation
- Operator: DLC Media
- Sister stations: WVUB, WVUT

History
- First air date: May 17, 1965 (as WAOV-FM)
- Former call signs: WAOV-FM (1965–1979); WRTB (1979–1986)

Technical information
- Licensing authority: FCC
- Facility ID: 66637
- Class: A
- ERP: 2,150 watts
- HAAT: 117.7 m (386 ft)
- Transmitter coordinates: 38°39′06″N 87°28′37″W

Links
- Public license information: Public file; LMS
- Webcast: Listen Live
- Website: 967therock.com

WFML (96.7 FM) is a radio station licensed to Vincennes, Indiana, United States. The station airs a mainstream rock format and is owned by the Vincennes University Foundation. DLC Media handles operations of the station for the university.

Established as a privately owned commercial station in 1965, it was donated to the university in 1986 so its owner could buy a higher-power FM station. While owned by the university, WFML operates on a commercial basis, unlike the other Vincennes University broadcast outlets. For most of the last 20 years, commercial groups have contracted with the university to run WFML.

== History ==
=== Commercial years ===
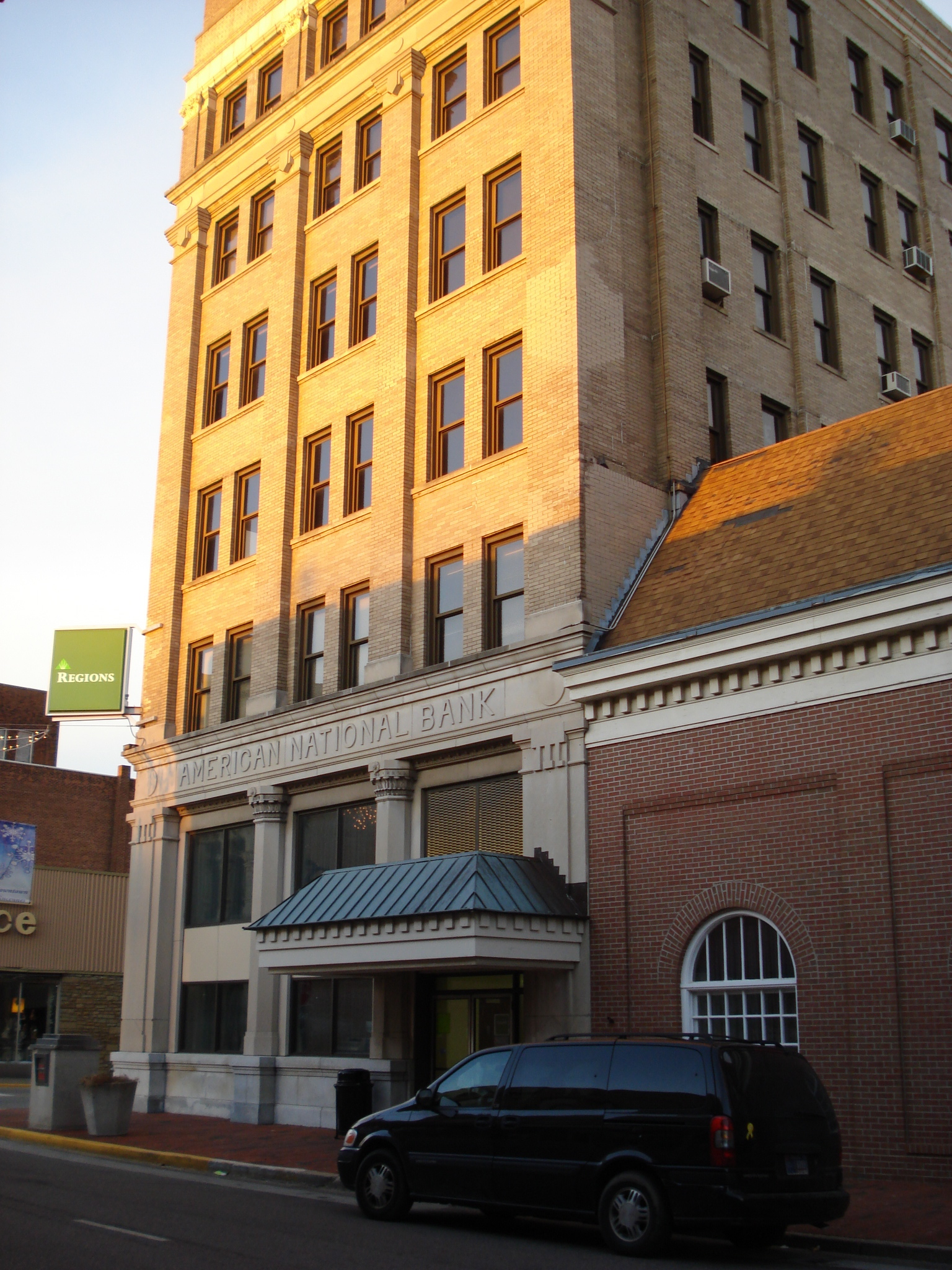
The American National Bank Building was the original location of WAOV-FM's studio and transmitter

On February 10, 1965, the Vincennes Sun Company, owner of WAOV (1450 AM), received a construction permit to build a new FM station in Vincennes, with the transmitter at its studio site in the American National Bank Building. The station signed on May 17, 1965, initially simulcasting the AM station as a test. It would not be until the fall of 1966 when WAOV-FM gained its own program format. By the early 1970s, WAOV-FM had become "Fun Music Radio"; in an era when most Top 40 formats were on AM and only a handful of pioneer FM hit music stations had emerged in major cities, the format provided contemporary music and was also syndicated to other stations by the station manager's son.

Adjacent to the tower for WAOV AM was the Vincennes Executive Inn, owned by Robert E. Green. Green sought to expand the inn, but he needed the station property to carry out his plan. Green bought WAOV-AM-FM in 1979; the radio stations moved into a penthouse studio in the Executive Inn, while the FM went through technical and programming changes. The call letters were changed to WRTB, and the transmitter was moved to a new tower shared with the AM station; the station was changed to live programming instead of using tapes.

=== Donation to VU ===
In 1986, Green acquired a pair of radio stations licensed to nearby Washington: WAMW (1580 AM) and WFML (106.5 FM), the third-oldest FM station in the state. The acquisition was made with the express purpose of obtaining the higher-power FM signal to relocate WRTB. Green could not retain both of the AM stations or both of the FM stations; he opted to donate the pair to the Vincennes University Foundation, which already owned noncommercial WVUB (91.1 FM). VU immediately sought a buyer for the Washington AM outlet.

VU's broadcasting program expanded with the ability to train students in the operation of a commercial radio station. However, the station was not profitable for the university. In 2002, the university opted to outsource the operations of WFML under a local marketing agreement (LMA). Media Five, a locally owned marketing agency, began programming the station with a country format, which continued in 2007 when DLC Media, led by Dave Crooks, successfully bid for the rights. DLC first shifted the station to classic country as "The Fox" before it changed the station to variety hits under the name "Max". WFML later switched to classic rock, retaining the brand. In 2014, the "Max" classic rock format was replaced by a return to variety hits using the Jack FM moniker. This continued until VU opted to resume operating WFML itself in 2017, using a soft adult contemporary "smooth rock" format focused on songs from the 1960s, 1970s and early 1980s. This format later evolved to classic hits, retaining the name "96.7 The Bridge".

On June 28, 2023, DLC Media resumed operating WFML under an LMA and replaced the classic hits format with mainstream rock, branded as "96.7 The Rock".
