= List of Indiana state historical markers in Knox County =

Location of Knox County in Indiana

This is a list of the Indiana state historical markers in Knox County.

This is intended to be a complete list of the official state historical markers placed in Knox County, Indiana, United States by the Indiana Historical Bureau. The locations of the historical markers and their latitude and longitude coordinates are included below when available, along with their names, years of placement, and topics as recorded by the Historical Bureau. There are 10 historical markers located in Knox County.

== Historical markers ==
| Marker title | Image | Year placed | Location | Topics |
|---|---|---|---|---|
| Shakertown | | 1966 | Junction of the southbound lanes of U.S. Route 41 with County Road 1100 (Gauger Road), 1 mile north of Oaktown; 38°53′31″N 87°26′32″W | Religion, Historic District, Neighborhoods, and Towns |
| Fort Knox, First Site | | 1966 | Junction of Buntin and 1st Streets (2 blocks south of the Old French House at Vincennes; 38°40′56″N 87°31′50″W | Military, Early Settlement and Exploration |
| Old French House | | 1995 | 509 N. 1st Street, north of the Seminary Street intersection in Vincennes; 38°41′0″N 87°31′40″W | Buildings and Architecture, Early Settlement and Exploration |
| Old French House | | 1995 | 509 N. 1st Street, north of the Seminary Street intersection in Vincennes; 38°41′0″N 87°31′40″W | Buildings and Architecture, Early Settlement and Exploration |
| The Old Cathedral "French and Indiana" Cemetery 1750-1846 | | 1974 | West of the Old Cathedral Catholic Church at South Second Street and CHurch Street. 38°40′45.3″N 87°32′3.20″W | Religion, Native American |
| Vincennes' Carnegie Library | | 2001 | Northwestern corner of the junction of 7th and Seminary Streets in Vincennes; 38°40′44″N 87°31′27″W | Carnegie Library, Buildings and Architecture |
| William Henry Harrison & Lewis & Clark Expedition | | 2006 | At the Indiana Territory State Historic Site (1 W. Harrison St.), near the junction of First and Harrison Streets in Vincennes; 38°41′8″N 87°31′32″W | Early Settlement and Exploration, Politics, "Lewis and Clark", American Indian/Native American |
| Mary Clark | | 2009 | At the Knox County Courthouse: 111 N. 7th Street in Vincennes; 38°40′36″N 87°31′38″W | African American, Laws & Court Cases, Women |
| Tecumseh and Harrison | | 2011 | 3 W. Scott St., Vincennes; 38°41′06″N 87°31′33.3″W | American Indian; Military |
| Red Skelton "One of America's Clowns" | | 2017 | 111 West Lyndale Avenue, Vincennes; 38°41′29″N 87°31′00″W | Arts & Culture |
| Historic Pantheon Theatre | | 2021 | 428 Main St., Vincennes; 38°40′40″N 87°31′48″W | Arts and Culture; Buildings and Architecture |

== See also ==
- List of Indiana state historical markers
- National Register of Historic Places listings in Knox County, Indiana
