= WVUB =

- Vincennes, Indiana; United States
- Broadcast area: Vincennes; Bicknell; Princeton, Indiana; Bridgeport; Lawrenceville
- Frequency: 91.1 MHz (HD Radio)
- Branding: Blazer 91.1

Programming
- Format: Adult album alternative
- Affiliations: NPR

Ownership
- Owner: Vincennes University
- Sister stations: WFML; WVUT

History
- First air date: December 7, 1970
- Former call signs: WFML, WVUC
- Former frequencies: 91.3 MHz (1970–1974)
- Call sign meaning: "Vincennes University Broadcasting"

Technical information
- Licensing authority: FCC
- Facility ID: 70241
- Class: B
- ERP: 50,000 watts
- HAAT: 152 meters (499 ft)
- Transmitter coordinates: 38°39′0″N 87°28′37″W

Links
- Public license information: Public file; LMS
- Webcast: wvub.streamguys1.com/live-mp3
- Website: wvub.org

WVUB (91.1 FM, "Blazer 91.1") is a public radio station licensed to Vincennes, Indiana, United States. The station is owned by Vincennes University (VU), operating from studios in Davis Hall on the university's main campus on North 2nd Street (near Rosedale Avenue). Its transmitter is located approximately 2 miles (3.2 km) southeast of Vincennes, near Vincennes Lincoln High School.

WVUB, which has an effective radiated power of 50,000 watts, broadcasts an adult album alternative ("Triple-A") format. It also serves as a training ground for students, who gather and produce local news, both for WVUB and WVUT, the university's public television station. WVUB brands itself as Blazer 91.1, named for the university's mascot, the Trailblazers.

== History ==
On September 2, 1970, the FCC awarded a construction permit to Vincennes University to build a new noncommercial radio station on 91.3 MHz. The station began broadcasting on that frequency on December 7, 1970, before being approved in 1973 to move to 91.1 MHz at 50,000 watts, a change carried out the next year.

Prior to 2021, the station broadcast a hot adult contemporary format. The current Triple-A format was instituted in 2019 on the station's HD Radio subchannel, "ALT 91", as an additional outlet for student involvement.
