= Annie Guinn Massey =

President General of the United Daughters of the Confederacy

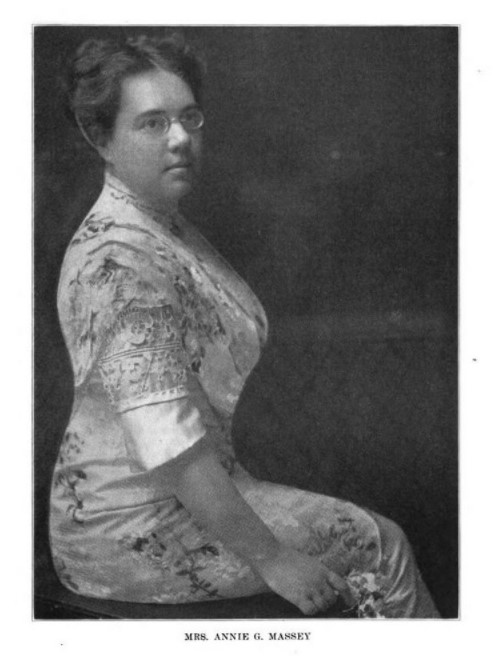

President General of the United Daughters of the Confederacy
- In office 1933–1935

Personal details
- Born: Anna Eliza Guinn; February 25, 1872 Hot Springs, Arkansas, U.S.
- Died: December 20, 1948 (aged 76)
- Spouse: William E. Massey
- Children: 2
- Education: Ouachita College
- Occupation: writer

Annie Guinn Massey (February 25, 1872 – December 20, 1948) was an American writer, socialite, and clubwoman who served as the president general of the United Daughters of the Confederacy from 1933 to 1935. She was the first woman from Arkansas to be elected as the United Daughters of the Confederacy's president general.

== Early life and education ==
Massey was born Anna Eliza Guinn on February 25, 1872, in Hot Springs, Arkansas, to Chessley Richard Guinn and Eliza Jane Guinn. Her father was a veteran of the Mexican–American War and the Civil War.

She was educated in public schools before studying history and literature at Ouachita College.

== Clubs and societies ==
Massey was a member of the United Daughters of the Confederacy, the League of American Pen Women, and the Authors' and Composers' Society of Little Rock. She was the first president of the School Improvement Association of Hot Springs and served as secretary of the Garland County Council for National Defense. Massey also served three terms as president of the Hot Springs Fortnightly Club.

=== United Daughters of the Confederacy ===
Massey served as the president of the Arkansas Division of the United Daughters of the Confederacy and as vice president general of the national organization in 1923. She was later elected President General and took office in 1933. Massey was the first woman from Arkansas to serve as president general.

In 1934, during her administration, the United Daughters of the Confederacy sponsored 1,000 scholarships, valuing a total amount of around $500,000, and provided full ride scholarships to Vassar College and Washington and Lee University. During her administration, the membership within the Children of the Confederacy reached 30,000. She was re-elected for a second term in November 1934.

In June 1935, she presented the General Robert E. Lee Memorial Saber to Cadet David Campbell Wallace at the United States Military Academy. She also presented a portrait of General Robert E. Lee to the United States Army Signal School at Fort Monmouth.

== Writing ==
Massey was a historical writer and authored multiple works, including the books Toward the Goal of Knowing and At the King's Command and the play An Off Day at the Parsonage.

== Personal life ==
On November 10, 1893, she married William E. Massey. They had two children. She and her husband were written about in the society pages in Virginian newspapers. She died on December 20, 1948.
