= VCSC =

VCSC may refer to:

- Vigo County School Corporation
- Vincennes Community School Corporation
