= WRAY-TV (Indiana) =

Television station in Princeton, Indiana, United States (1953–1954)

- Princeton, Indiana; United States
- Channels: Analog: 52 (UHF)

Ownership
- Owner: Princeton Broadcasting Company

History
- First air date: December 11, 1953
- Last air date: July 15, 1954

Technical information
- ERP: 166 kW
- HAAT: 500 ft (150 m)
- Transmitter coordinates: 38°21′25″N 87°35′25″W

WRAY-TV was a television station broadcasting on channel 52 in Princeton, Indiana, United States. The station was owned and operated alongside radio station WRAY (1250 AM). It broadcast regular programming for just seven months, from December 1953 to July 1954, but broadcast one day a year through 1960 to carry a March of Dimes telethon.

== History ==
The Federal Communications Commission (FCC) granted the application of the Princeton Broadcasting Corporation, owner of WRAY (1250 AM), to build a television station on Princeton's assigned channel 52 on March 12, 1953. WRAY announced that it would use as much of the existing facilities and personnel as it could, expanding its building on Broadway Street to house the new operation. The facility was designed with a north–south directional pattern, to beam a signal toward Vincennes and Evansville. Program features of the independent station, which began broadcasting December 11, included local news, wrestling, and the "Bar 52 Theatre" each afternoon.

On July 15, 1954, it was announced that the station would go off air until September 11 to carry out a financial reorganization, citing a lack of advertising revenue. Unlike many UHF stations that were struggling against superior VHF competition, WRAY-TV was far from the nearest VHF outlet, at Louisville, Kentucky—more than 100 mi (160 km) away—but it was competing with the two UHF stations in the Evansville market, WEHT and WFIE, at a time when the market could not support three outlets.

The channel 52 facility, however, would not remain completely dormant. While it was fully operational, the station aired its first March of Dimes telethon. Even though WRAY-TV had gone silent, the underlying permit was still active, and with the support of station and March of Dimes officials and the blessing of the FCC, the station began broadcasting for 30 hours a year, just to air the telethon. Raising thousands of dollars each year, the telethon featured a variety of dignitaries, attractions, and famous personalities, including Princeton native Gil Hodges. The first telethon ran 18 hours. By 1960, the last year, more than 1,000 people appeared before the station's cameras; hundreds flocked to the radio and television studio, and the National Guard was called out to handle the crowds for the 30-hour event.

In late 1960, Vincennes University purchased the channel 52 equipment and filed to have the allocation moved north to Vincennes so that equipment did not need to be modified to work on channel 44, which had been assigned to that town. Vincennes applied for a television station on channel 52 in 1964, but successive reallocations by the FCC meant that WVUT-TV, the university's station, would broadcast on channel 22 instead.
