= Wheatland, Indiana =

- Town
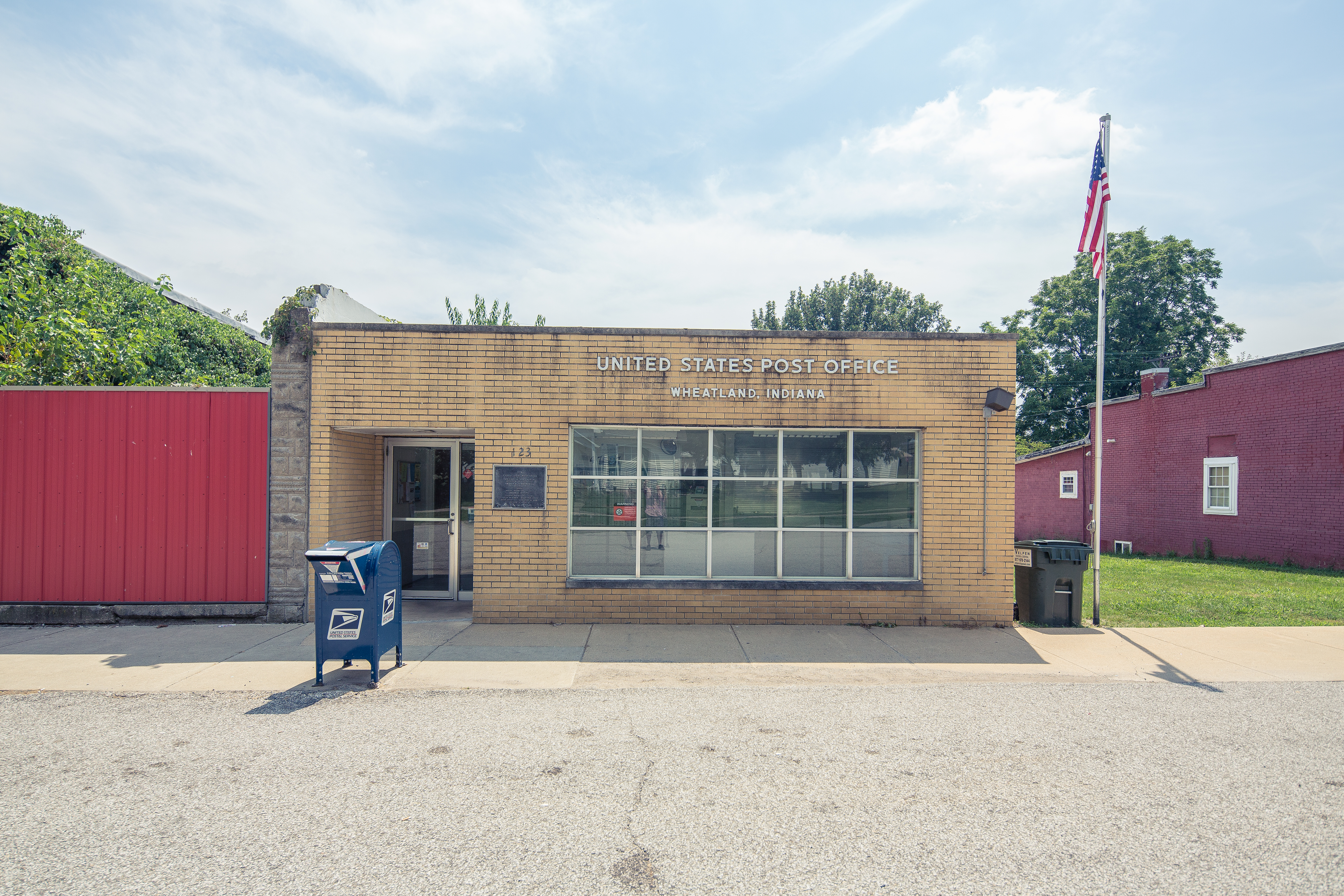
- Wheatland post office

- Seal

- Location of Wheatland in Knox County, Indiana.
- Coordinates: 38°39′48″N 87°18′23″W
- Country: United States
- State: Indiana
- County: Knox
- Township: Steen
- Founded: 1858

Area
  - Total: 0.41 sq mi (1.06 km^{2})
  - Land: 0.41 sq mi (1.06 km^{2})
  - Water: 0 sq mi (0.00 km^{2})
- Elevation: 489 ft (149 m)

Population (2020)
  - Total: 390
  - Density: 952.2/sq mi (367.65/km^{2})
- Time zone: UTC-5 (Eastern (EST))
  - Summer (DST): UTC-4 (EDT)
- ZIP code: 47597
- Area code: 812
- FIPS code: 18-83564
- GNIS feature ID: 2397739
- Website: www.townofwheatland.in

Wheatland is a town in Steen Township, Knox County, Indiana, United States. As of the 2020 census, Wheatland had a population of 390.

== History ==
Wheatland was laid out in 1858. It was named from the production of wheat in the vicinity.

== Geography ==
According to the 2010 census, Wheatland has a total area of 0.41 square miles (1.06 km^{2}), all land.

== Demographics ==
Historical population
Census	Pop.	Note	%±
1880	220		—
1930	806		—
1940	713		−11.5%
1950	735		3.1%
1960	614		−16.5%
1970	562		−8.5%
1980	532		−5.3%
1990	439		−17.5%
2000	504		14.8%
2010	480		−4.8%
2020	390		−18.7%
U.S. Decennial Census

=== 2010 census ===
As of the census of 2010, there were 480 people, 191 households, and 132 families living in the town. The population density was 1,170.7 inhabitants per square mile (452.0/km^{2}). There were 220 housing units at an average density of 536.6 per square mile (207.2/km^{2}). The racial makeup of the town was 97.9% White, 0.2% African American, 0.2% Native American, and 1.7% from two or more races. Hispanic or Latino of any race were 2.9% of the population.

There were 191 households, of which 41.4% had children under the age of 18 living with them, 48.7% were married couples living together, 12.6% had a female householder with no husband present, 7.9% had a male householder with no wife present, and 30.9% were non-families. 26.7% of all households were made up of individuals, and 11.6% had someone living alone who was 65 years of age or older. The average household size was 2.51 and the average family size was 2.97.

The median age in the town was 36 years. 27.1% of residents were under the age of 18; 7.3% were between the ages of 18 and 24; 27.4% were from 25 to 44; 25.9% were from 45 to 64; and 12.5% were 65 years of age or older. The gender makeup of the town was 49.6% male and 50.4% female.

=== 2000 census ===
As of the census of 2000, there were 504 people, 206 households, and 138 families living in the town. The population density was 1,218.2 inhabitants per square mile (470.3/km^{2}). There were 235 housing units at an average density of 568.0 per square mile (219.3/km^{2}). The racial makeup of the town was 98.61% White, 0.40% African American, 0.20% Native American, 0.40% from other races, and 0.40% from two or more races. Hispanic or Latino of any race were 0.60% of the population.

There were 206 households, out of which 33.5% had children under the age of 18 living with them, 51.5% were married couples living together, 11.7% had a female householder with no husband present, and 33.0% were non-families. 29.1% of all households were made up of individuals, and 11.7% had someone living alone who was 65 years of age or older. The average household size was 2.43 and the average family size was 3.01.

In the town, the population was spread out, with 27.2% under the age of 18, 8.5% from 18 to 24, 30.2% from 25 to 44, 21.6% from 45 to 64, and 12.5% who were 65 years of age or older. The median age was 37 years. For every 100 females, there were 90.9 males. For every 100 females age 18 and over, there were 94.2 males.

The median income for a household in the town was $27,174, and the median income for a family was $36,818. Males had a median income of $28,750 versus $21,458 for females. The per capita income for the town was $14,646. About 12.1% of families and 16.3% of the population were below the poverty line, including 18.9% of those under age 18 and 8.1% of those age 65 or over.

== Education ==
It is in the South Knox School Corporation.

== Notable people ==
James D. Williams, the fourteenth governor of Indiana, lived in Wheatland.

Todd Allen, Negro League player for the Indianapolis ABCs and other teams, was born in Wheatland.
