= Todd Allen (baseball) =

American baseball player

- Third baseman / Manager
- Born: January 14, 1885; Wheatland, Indiana, U.S.
- Died: January 17, 1971 (aged 86); Crown Hill Cemetery and Arboretum, Indianapolis, Indiana, U.S.
- Batted: Right Threw: Right

Negro leagues debut
- 1908, for the Indianapolis ABCs

Last Negro leagues appearance
- 1925, for the Indianapolis ABCs

Negro leagues (Note: On December 16, 2020, Major League Baseball declared certain Negro leagues, from the span of 1920–1948, to be "major" leagues. Allen's statistics reflect his time in the Negro leagues from 1925, the final year of his career) statistics
- Batting average: .500
- Hits: 5
- Runs batted in: 1
- Managerial record: 17–53
- Winning percentage: .243
- Stats at Baseball Reference
- Managerial record at Baseball Reference

Teams
- Indianapolis ABCs (1908–1913, 1915–1917, 1925); French Lick Plutos (1914); Royal Poinciana Hotel (1915–1916); Lincoln Giants (1917–1919)

Herbert Todd Allen (January 14, 1885 – January 17, 1971) was an American Negro leagues third baseman and manager from 1908 to 1925, playing mostly with the Indianapolis ABCs.

Allen was born in Wheatland, Indiana, in 1885. By 1908, at the age of 23, he was playing third base for the Indianapolis ABCs. He played most of his seasons for the ABCs, including a winter season with a mostly ABCs team that played for the Royal Poinciana Hotel in West Palm Beach, Florida.

After the ABCs, Allen played for a number of years for the French Lick Plutos and the Lincoln Giants. He appeared as late as 1925 for the Indianapolis ABCs.

After baseball, his World War II draft card shows he was working for Hook Drug Company at the corner of California and Market Street, and living in Indianapolis, Indiana. It also lists his closest relative, likely his wife, as Jessie Allen.

Allen is buried at Crown Hill Cemetery and Arboretum in Section 99 B, Lot 338 in Indianapolis, Indiana.
