= Fortnightly Club =

The Fortnightly Club is the name of several women's clubs in the United States, and may refer to:

- Fortnightly of Chicago
- Haddon Fortnightly Club House
- Vincennes Fortnightly Club

== See also ==
- List of women's clubs
