= David Goodnow =

American news anchor

David Clay Goodnow (born October 20, 1939) is an American television news anchor, known for his work on CNN Headline News.

== Biography ==
Goodnow was born in Vincennes, Indiana. He is a 1957 graduate of Vincennes Lincoln High School, and a member of the Pi Kappa Phi fraternity. He got his start in broadcasting on the AM side of WAKO-FM in September 1959 and in 1961, he moved to WAOV, a radio station in Vincennes, Indiana. He then moved to the television side of the business first taking a job at WTVW in Evansville, Indiana and later WTHI-TV in Terre Haute, Indiana. From 1982 until 2000, he worked as an anchor for CNN Headline News, one of the original anchors at their Atlanta International Headquarters.

As of 2016, he resides outside of Atlanta, Georgia.

== Freemasonry ==
Goodnow was a member of DeMolay, and is in the DeMolay International Hall of Fame, and is also a member of the DeMolay Legion of Honor. He was raised a Master Mason in Lessing Lodge No. 464 in Evansville, Indiana. He also received the 33° in the Ancient Accepted Scottish Rite, Northern Masonic Jurisdiction and the Caleb B. Smith award from the Grand Lodge of Indiana.
