= Andrew Nicholson Farmstead =

- U.S. National Register of Historic Places
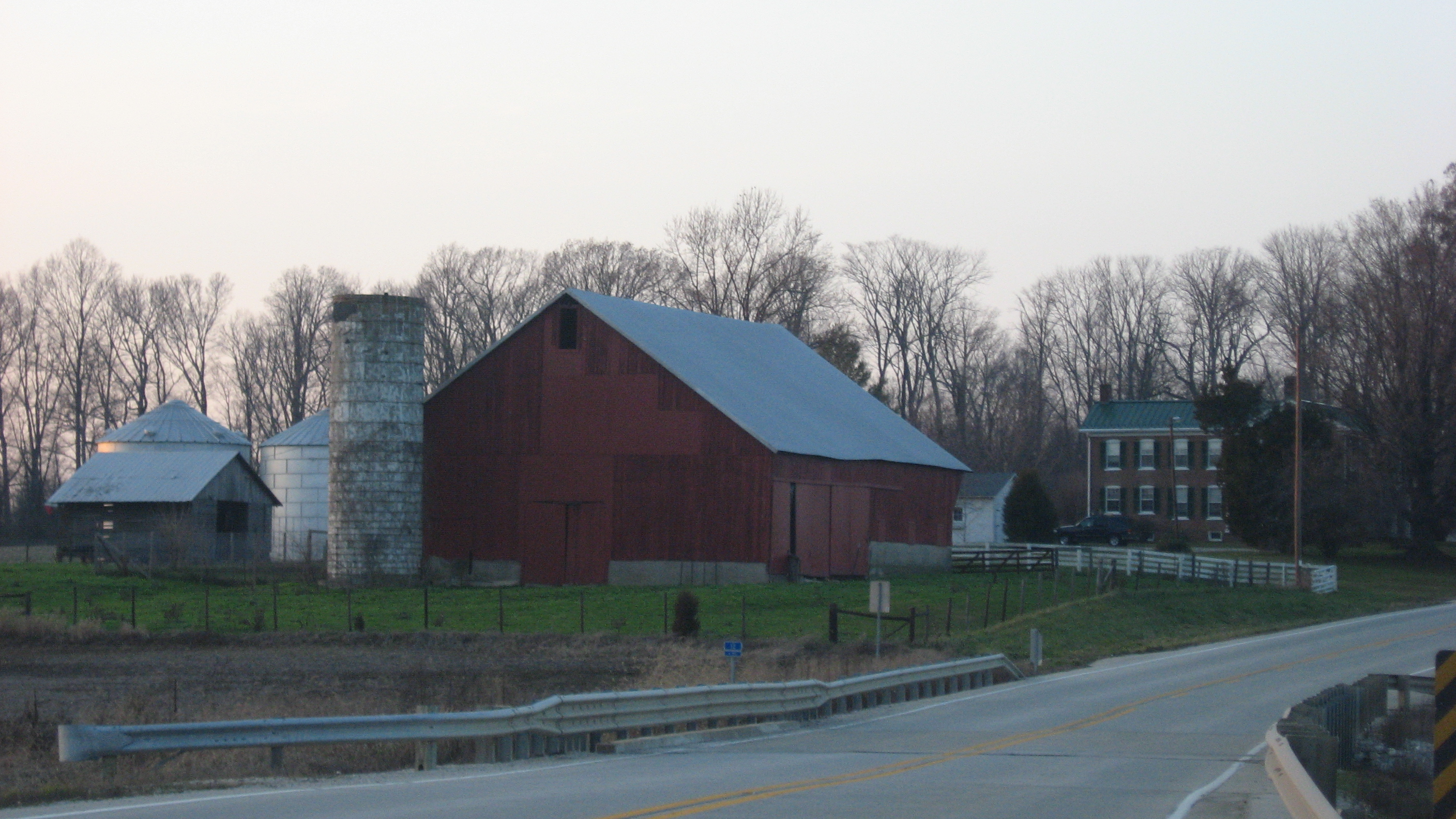
- Andrew Nicholson Farmstead, December 2011

- Location within Indiana Location within the United States
- Location: 12095 E. State Road 550, northwest of Wheatland, Indiana in Steen Township, Knox County, Indiana
- Coordinates: 38°40′08″N 87°19′00″W
- Area: 6.5 acres (2.6 ha)
- Built: 1863
- Built by: Starner & Heidicher
- Architectural style: Greek Revival
- NRHP reference No.: 05000606
- Added to NRHP: June 17, 2005

Andrew Nicholson Farmstead is a historic home and farm located in Steen Township, Knox County, Indiana. The house was built in 1863, and is a two-story, five-bay, vernacular Greek Revival style brick I-house. An addition to the rear ell was made in 1909. Also on the property are the contributing English barn (1905), garage (1920s), corn crib (1937), and milk house, smokehouse and fruit house ruins (1863).

It was added to the National Register of Historic Places in 2005.
