= Ebner-Free House =

Historic house in Indiana, United States

- Formerly listed on the U.S. National Register of Historic Places
- Location: 120 Locust, Vincennes, Indiana
- Area: less than one acre
- Built: 1887
- Architectural style: Stick/eastlake
- NRHP reference No.: 85000601

Significant dates
- Added to NRHP: March 21, 1985
- Removed from NRHP: June 2, 1999

Ebner-Free House was a historic home located at Vincennes, Indiana. It was built in 1887, and was a 2 1/2-story, frame dwelling with Eastlake movement ornamentation. It has been demolished.

It was added to the National Register of Historic Places in 1985 and delisted in 1999.
