= Vincennes Community School Corporation =

School district in Indiana, United States

Vincennes Community School Corporation (VCSC) is a school district headquartered in Vincennes, Indiana.

Its boundary is that of Vincennes Township, Knox County, and the district includes all of the municipality of Vincennes.

== History ==
In 1962 the district had been proposed and a referendum on its establishment was to occur. Originally the district was to include the northern part of the township and Vincennes city.

In 2025 the district established its own police department.

== Schools ==
Secondary schools

- Vincennes Lincoln High School
- George Rogers Clark Middle School

Elementary schools

- Benjamin Franklin Elementary School
- Riley Elementary School
- Tecumseh-Harrison Elementary School
- Francis Vigo Elementary School

Washington Elementary closed in spring 2010.
