= Vincennes Lincoln High School =

Location
- 1545 S. Hart St. Rd. Vincennes, Indiana 47591; United States; 38°39′4″N 87°29′58″W

Information
- Type: Public high school
- Established: 1897 (as Vincennes High School)
- School district: Vincennes Community School Corporation
- Superintendent: Gregory Parsley
- Principal: Shea Duke
- Teaching staff: 50.00 (FTE)
- Grades: 9-12
- Enrollment: 711 (2023-2024)
- Student to teacher ratio: 14.22
- Colors: Green, white, and orange
- Mascot: Big A
- Team name: Alices (Lady Alices)
- Rival: Jasper High School Washington High School (Washington, Indiana)
- Newspaper: The Old Post Sentinel
- Yearbook: Senior Sentinel
- Feeder schools: Clark Middle School
- Gym capacity: 5,466
- Website: School website

Vincennes Lincoln High School, usually referred to as Lincoln High School within Vincennes and archaically as Vincennes High School, is a high school located in Vincennes, Indiana, United States. It is a part of the Vincennes Community School Corporation. The school's primary colors are green and white, with its secondary being orange, and its team name is The Alices (or The Lady Alices).

== History ==
The original Vincennes High School, built in 1897, was located at Fifth and Buntin Streets, near downtown Vincennes. An addition was built in 1916 on the corner of Sixth and Buntin, with another 20-room addition replacing the 1897 section in 1958. Over the years, the name Lincoln High School became the school's official name.

In the fall of 1988, the high school was relocated to a newly built, more spacious building on Hart Street Road, on the southeast edge of town. With the addition of grade 6, Clark Middle School occupied the old high school building from 1988/89 until 2009/10. At that time, the middle school relocated to a new building adjacent to the high school, leaving the building vacant.

== Athletics ==
Vincennes Lincoln IHSAA Athletic State Championships
Sport	Titles	Year(s)
Boys' basketball	2	1923, 1981
Boys' baseball	1	2002
Total	3

The IHSAA uses the name "Vincennes Lincoln" to distinguish the school from Cambridge City Lincoln High School. The Alices were State Champions in basketball (1923 and 1981) and baseball (2002). The mascot is called Big A.

== Notable alumni ==
- Clint Barmes, class of 1997, Major League Baseball player; Colorado Rockies 2003–2010, Houston Astros 2011, Pittsburgh Pirates 2012–2014, San Diego Padres 2015
- David Carter, class of 1972, football offensive lineman; Western Kentucky 1973–1976, Houston Oilers 1977–1984, New Orleans Saints 1984–1985
- Albert K. Dawson, class of 1905, photographer and film correspondent in World War I
- David Goodnow, class of 1957, former CNN anchor
- Curtis Painter, class of 2004, football quarterback; Purdue Boilermakers 2005–2008; Indianapolis Colts 2009–2011; Baltimore Ravens (practice squad) 2012; New York Giants 2013–2014
- Dan Stryzinski, class of 1983, football punter; Indiana Hoosiers 1984–1987, Pittsburgh Steelers 1990–1991, Tampa Bay Buccaneers 1992–1994, Atlanta Falcons 1995–2000, Kansas City Chiefs 2001–2002, New York Jets 2003

== See also ==
- List of high schools in Indiana
