= Pyramid Mound =

- Pyramid Mound (12k14)
- U.S. National Register of Historic Places
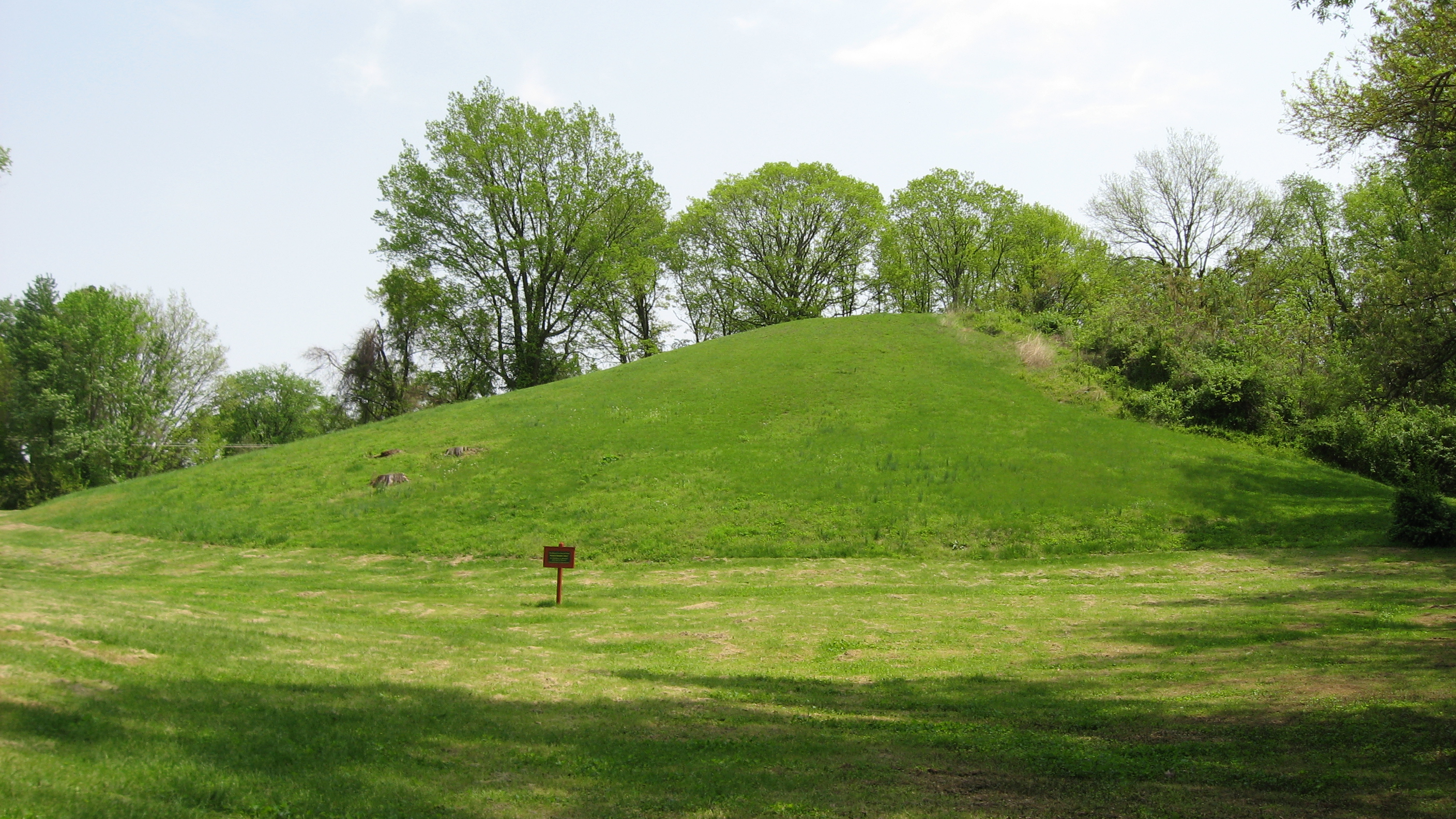
- View from the north

- Location within Indiana Location within the United States
- Location: Southern side of Wabash Avenue, southeast of central Vincennes
- Nearest city: Vincennes, Indiana
- Coordinates: 38°40′14″N 87°30′22″W
- Area: 5 acres (2.0 ha)
- NRHP reference No.: 75000023
- Added to NRHP: May 12, 1975

Pyramid Mound, designated 12k14, is a locally important archaeological site at the city of Vincennes, Indiana. Located on the city's edge, this substantial loess hill bears evidence of prehistoric occupation, and it is a landmark to the city's contemporary residents.

== Archaeological work ==
A survey conducted by the Illinois State Museum in the early 1960s demonstrate that the region surrounding Vincennes was the homeland of a Mississippian group of people known as the Vincennes culture.

Based upon the published results of the 1874 Smithsonian survey, an amateur antiquarian writing in the 1890s remarked on the relationship of Pyramid Mound to larger archaeological sites in the east central United States. Besides proposing that it was related to the large geometric earthworks that the Hopewell built in Ohio, he suggested that Pyramid and several other mounds near Vincennes marked the northeastern boundary of a confederacy that was centered at the Mississippian city of Cahokia near St. Louis, Missouri, although he appeared not to understand the substantial cultural differences between the two peoples of "Mound Builders." Two different histories of Vincennes and its vicinity, published in 1886 and 1911, regarded Pyramid Mound and the other nearby flat-topped mounds as evidence of prehistoric religious sites comparable to the pyramids of the Aztecs in Mexico City.

Later archaeological work, conducted by professionals in the late twentieth century, has largely discounted earlier conclusions. Accounts published in the 1970s and 1998 concluded that Pyramid and comparable sites nearby were actually natural loess hills that Indians of the Woodland period chose to use as cemeteries. Contributing to this conclusion is the fact that these hills are consistently of similar sizes, composed of the same sorts of soil, located on the eastern edge of the Wabash River valley, and shaped to be in line with the prevailing winds. Consequently, although these hills are definitely shaped like artificial burial mounds and consistently called "mounds", they are not truly mounds of any sort.

== Protection ==
Despite its natural origins, Pyramid Mound is an important archaeological site, and because of its archaeological importance, the "mound" was listed on the National Register of Historic Places in 1975. It is the center of a park operated by the Knox County Parks and Recreation Department.

== See also ==
- List of archaeological sites on the National Register of Historic Places in Indiana
