= Enoco Coal Mine =

- U.S. National Register of Historic Places
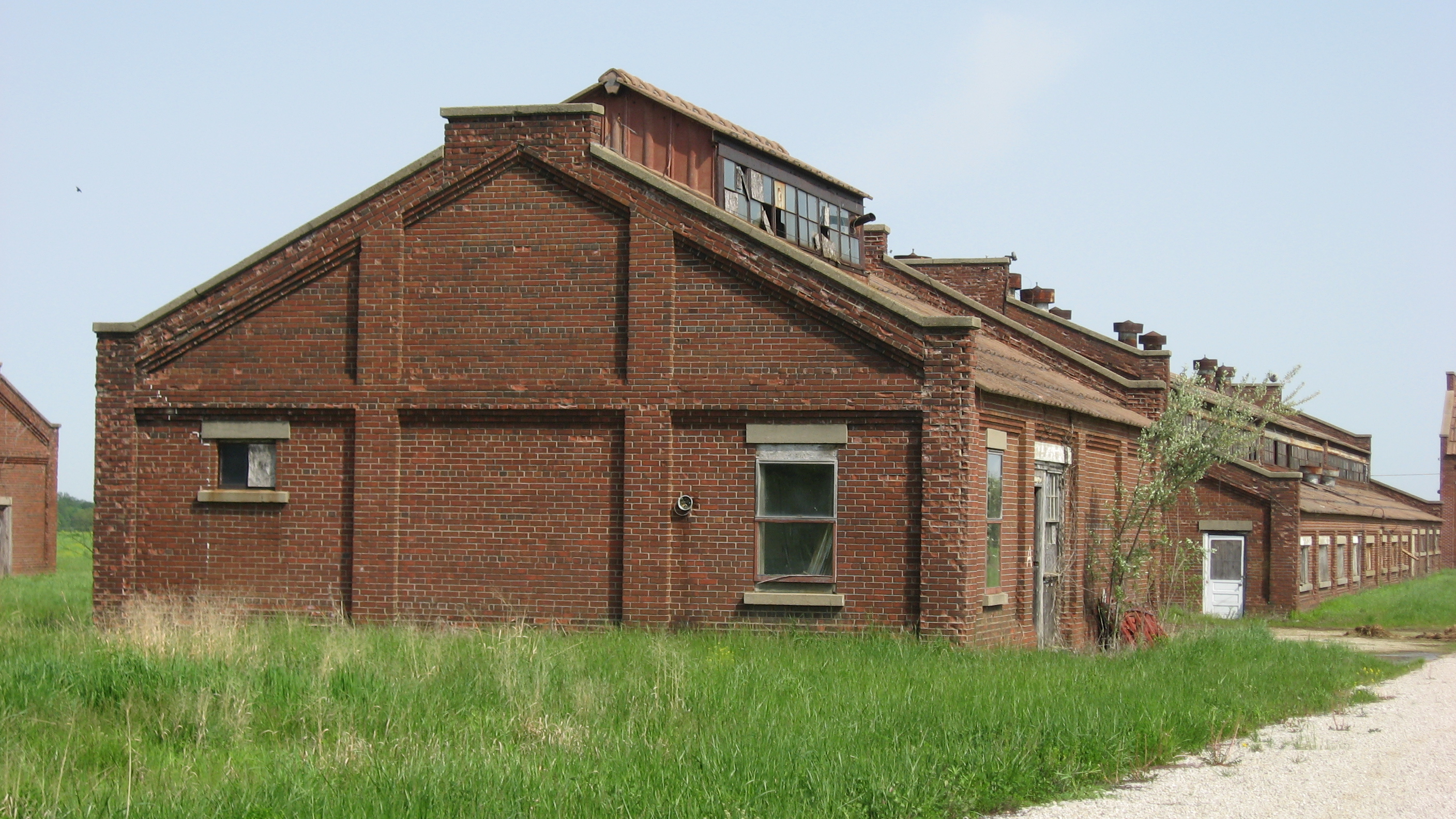
- Buildings at the Enoco Coal Mine, April 2011

- Location within Indiana Location within the United States
- Location: Northern side of Grundman Rd., 1.5 miles south of Bruceville, Washington Township, Knox County, Indiana
- Coordinates: 38°43′46″N 87°24′50″W
- Area: 148.4 acres (60.1 ha)
- Built: 1941-1962
- Built by: Knox Consolidated Coal Company
- Architectural style: Greek Revival
- NRHP reference No.: 10001100
- Added to NRHP: December 28, 2010

Enoco Coal Mine, also known as the Knox County Coal Company, is a historic Bituminous coal mine located in Washington Township, Knox County, Indiana. The facility was built in 1941 by the Knox Consolidated Coal Company and remained in use until 1962. The property includes five original brick buildings, underground coal tunnels, evidence of tailing piles, railbeds, and other features.

It was added to the National Register of Historic Places in 2010.
