= Gregg Park =

- U.S. National Register of Historic Places
- U.S. Historic district
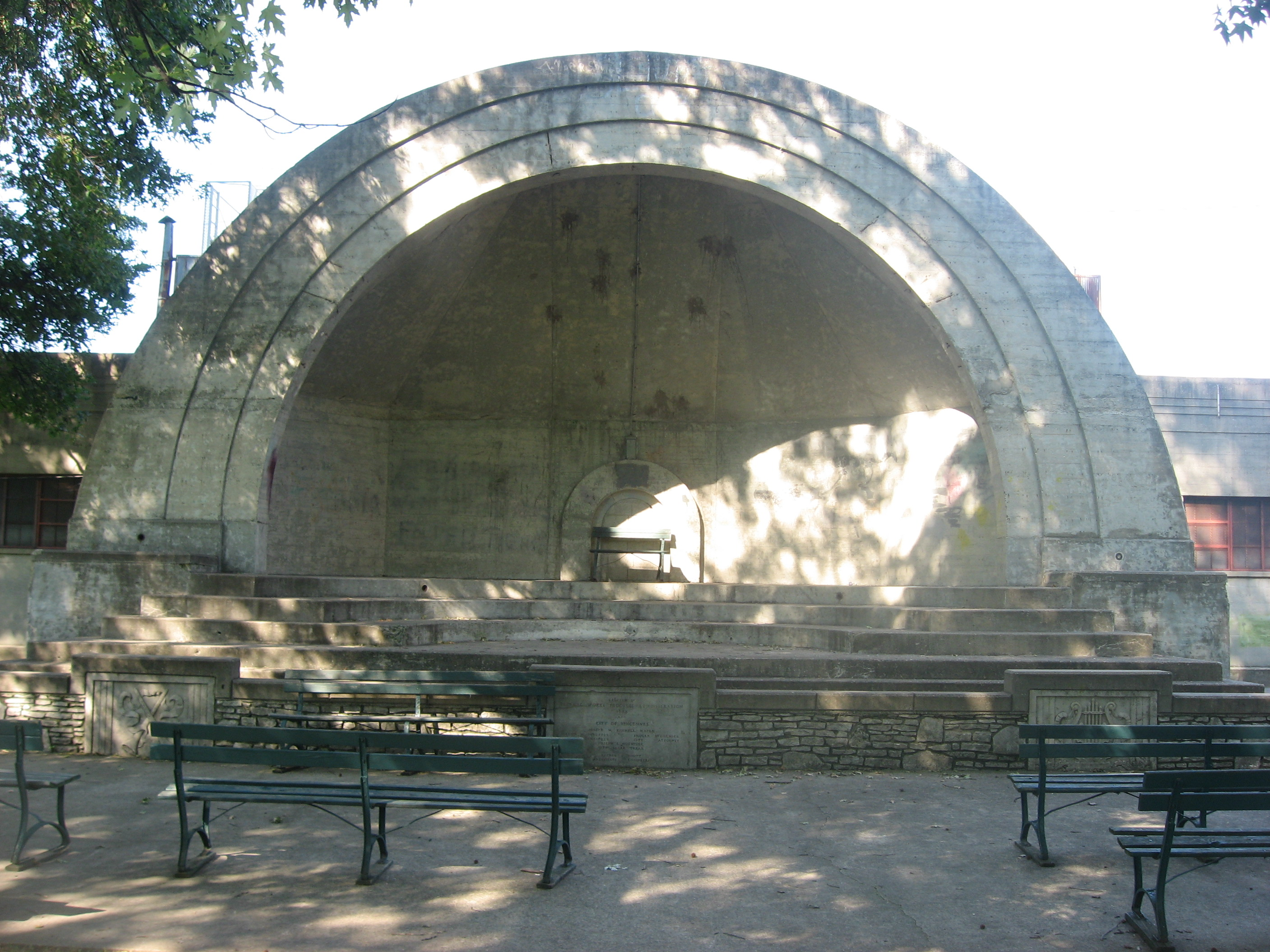
- Gregg Park bandshell, July 2013

- Location within Indiana Location within the United States
- Location: 2014 Oliphant Dr., Vincennes, Indiana
- Coordinates: 38°41′06″N 87°30′08″W
- Area: 22 acres (8.9 ha)
- Built: 1931, 1938-1939
- Architect: Sutton, Byron, and Routt, Lester W.
- Architectural style: Park Rustic, Moderne
- NRHP reference No.: 13000757
- Added to NRHP: September 25, 2013

Gregg Park is a historic public park and national historic district located at Vincennes, Indiana. The park was dedicated in 1931, and developed by the Works Progress Administration (WPA) in 1938–1939. The WPA constructed a limestone shelterhouse, concrete Moderne style bandshell / grandstand, the brick main entrance gate, and horseshoe pits. The park is named for Vincennes mayor Claude E. Gregg (1885–1931) and is a popular spot for swimming.

It was added to the National Register of Historic Places in 2013.
