= WVUT =

Television station in Vincennes, Indiana

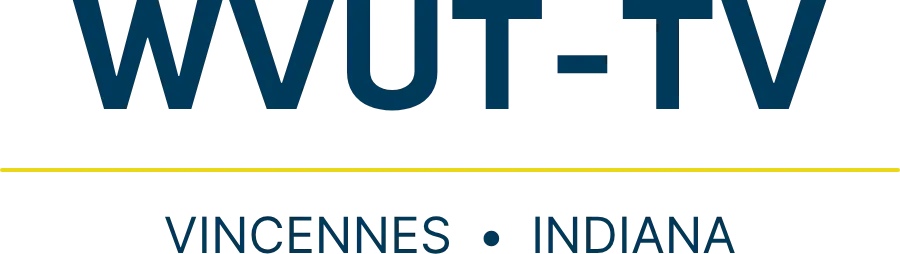
- Vincennes–Terre Haute, Indiana; United States
- City: Vincennes, Indiana
- Channels: Digital: 31 (UHF); Virtual: 22
- Branding: WVUT; Newscenter 22

Programming
- Affiliations: 22.1: Educational independent; for others, see § Subchannels

Ownership
- Owner: Vincennes University; (Board of Trustees for the Vincennes University)
- Sister stations: WVUB

History
- First air date: February 15, 1968
- Former channel numbers: Analog: 22 (UHF, 1968–2009); Digital: 52 (UHF, until 2009), 22 (UHF, 2009–2020)
- Former affiliations: NET (1968–1970); PBS (1970–2026)
- Call sign meaning: "Vincennes University Television"

Technical information
- Licensing authority: FCC
- Facility ID: 4329
- ERP: 69.4 kW
- HAAT: 161.8 m (531 ft)
- Transmitter coordinates: 38°39′6″N 87°28′37″W

Links
- Public license information: Public file; LMS
- Website: www.wvut.org

WVUT (channel 22) is an educational independent television station in Vincennes, Indiana, United States. It is owned by Vincennes University alongside campus radio/adult album alternative station and NPR member WVUB (91.1 FM). The two stations share studios at Davis Hall on the campus of Vincennes University on North 2nd Street (near Rosedale Avenue) in Vincennes; WVUT's transmitter is located southeast of the city off SR 61.

Until 2026, WVUT served as the PBS member station of record for the Terre Haute television market, where Vincennes is located.

== History ==
The station's history traces back to the launch of a television station in Princeton, WRAY-TV (channel 52), a commercial independent station that signed on in December 1953; it was co-owned with radio station WRAY (1250 AM), which shared studio space with WRAY-TV. With competition from two television stations—WEHT and WFIE—out of the nearby Evansville market, WRAY-TV was never successful and ceased operations after seven months, except for annual March of Dimes telethons through 1960. In late 1960, Vincennes University purchased the studio equipment; WRAY-TV's license was surrendered to the Federal Communications Commission (FCC) in February 1961.

Vincennes University applied for channel 52 to be substituted for the originally provided 44 in Vincennes to avoid retuning equipment. This was granted, and an application for a construction permit followed in 1964. In 1965, the old channel 52 allocation was changed to UHF channel 34, and the construction permit originally issued on February 8, 1966, was issued under that allocation, only to be changed by the FCC to channel 22 a few weeks later as part of a second nationwide realignment of channel allocations for stations that had not yet been built. WVUT first signed on the air on February 15, 1968 (formal programming began four days later), as a member station of National Educational Television (NET). WVUT joined PBS when the reorganized network launched on October 5, 1970.

On April 4, 2026, Vincennes University announced that WVUT would end its PBS membership on June 30, 2026, following a review of operations and sustainability prompted by the 2025 end of federal public broadcasting funding.

== Programming ==
Local programming on WVUT includes a student-produced newscast, titled NewsCenter 22, which airs during Vincennes University's fall, winter and spring terms, as well as the weekly public affairs program 22 Magazine.

== Technical information ==
=== Subchannels ===
The station's signal is multiplexed:

Subchannels of WVUT
Channel	Res.	Short name	Programming
22.1	1080i	WVUT-HD	Main WVUT programming
22.2	1080i	WVUT-2	First Nations Experience
22.3	1080i	WVUT-3	WVUB simulcast

=== Analog-to-digital conversion ===
WVUT ended regular programming on its analog signal, over UHF channel 22, on June 12, 2009, the official date on which full-power television stations in the United States transitioned from analog to digital broadcasts under federal mandate. The station's digital signal relocated from its pre-transition UHF channel 52, which was among the high band UHF channels (52–69) that were removed from broadcasting use as a result of the transition, to its analog-era UHF channel 22 for post-transition operations.

As a result of the FCC repack, the station now broadcasts on UHF channel 31.
