= USS Vincennes =

USS Vincennes may refer to:

- USS Vincennes (1826), was an 18-gun sloop-of-war commissioned in 1826 and sold in 1867
- USS Vincennes (CA-44), was a New Orleans-class cruiser commissioned in 1937 and lost in the Battle of Savo Island in 1942
- USS Vincennes (CL-64) was a Cleveland-class cruiser commissioned in 1944 and decommissioned in 1946
- USS Vincennes (CG-49) was a Ticonderoga-class cruiser, commissioned in 1985 and decommissioned in 2005, primarily known for the shooting down of Iran Air Flight 655 in 1988, which killed all 290 on board.

== Commemoration ==
The City of Vincennes, Indiana has erected public art to commemorate the three 20th-century ships named Vincennes:

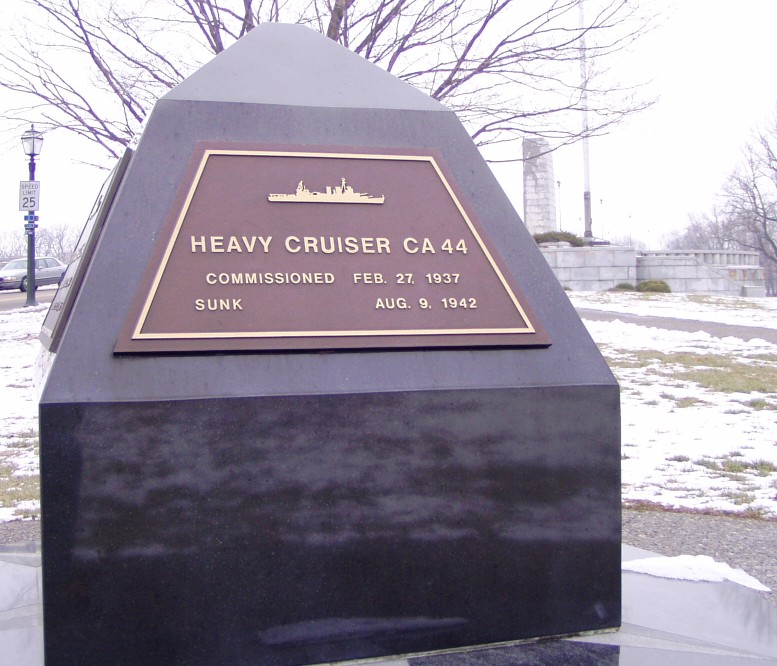
USS Vincennes (CA-44)

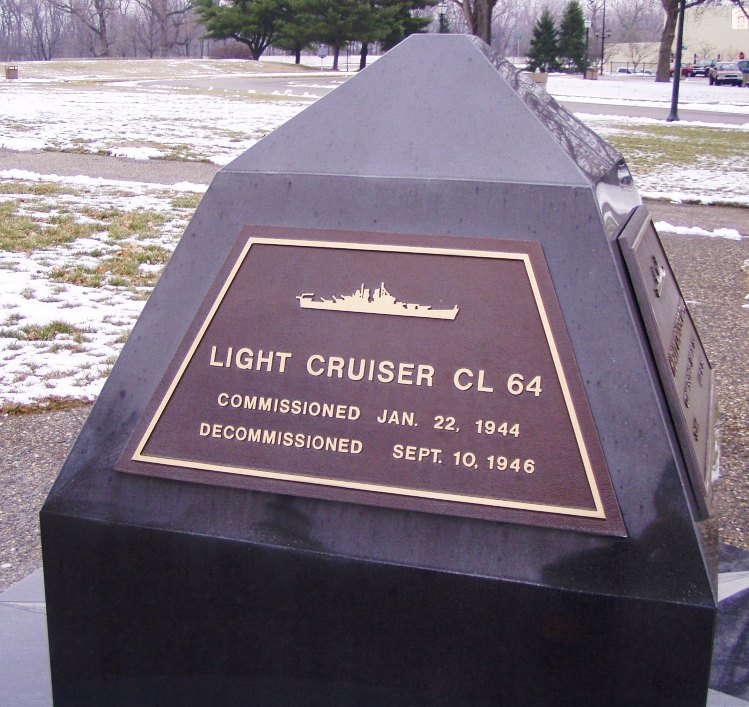
USS Vincennes (CL-64)

USS Vincennes (CG-49)
