= Hack and Simon Office Building =

- U.S. National Register of Historic Places
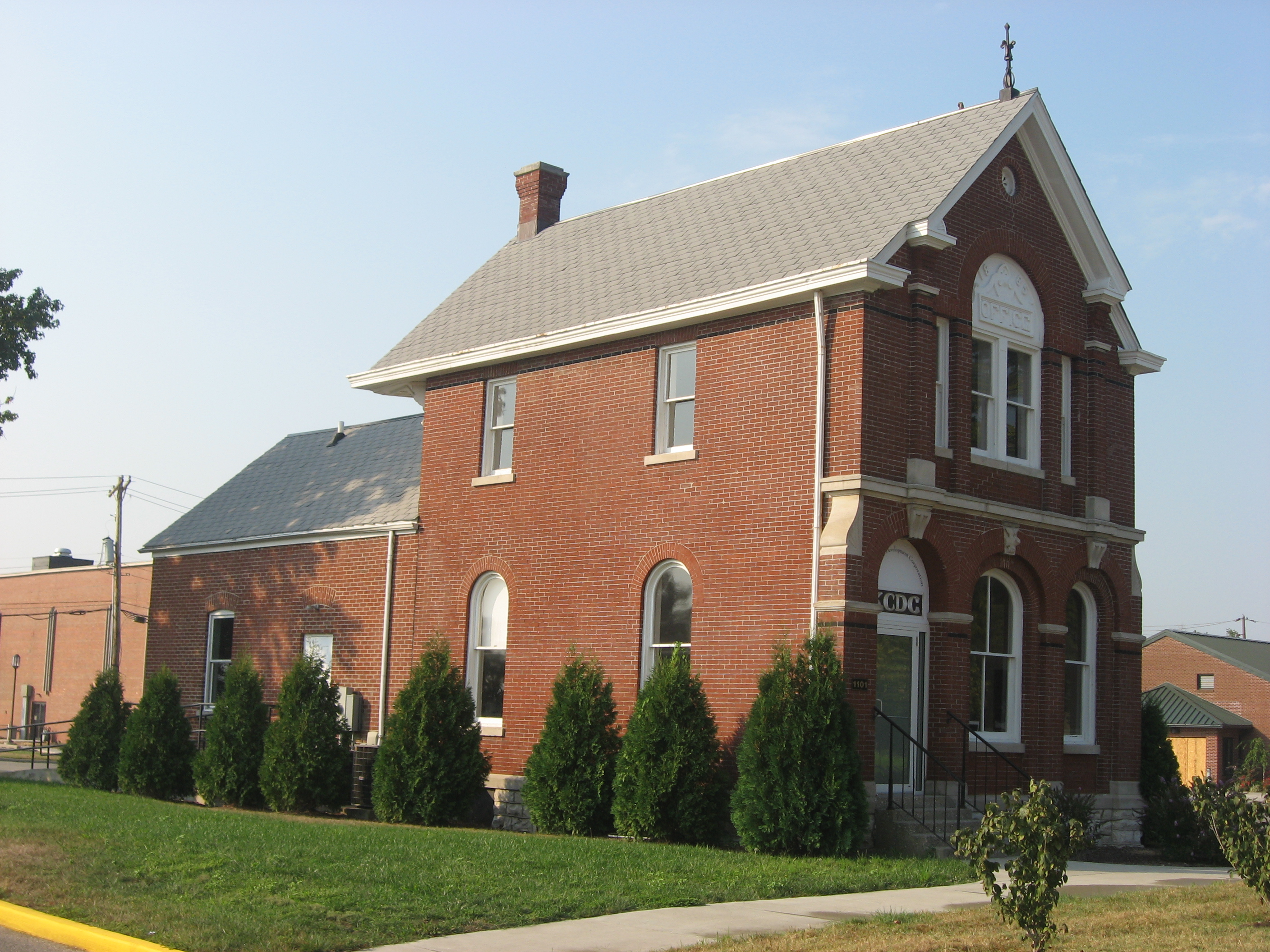
- Hack and Simon Office Building, September 2011

- Location within Indiana Location within the United States
- Location: 1006 N 3rd St., Vincennes, Indiana
- Coordinates: 38°41′3″N 87°31′13″W
- Area: less than one acre
- Built: 1885
- Architectural style: Romanesque
- NRHP reference No.: 03000141
- Added to NRHP: March 26, 2003

Hack and Simon Office Building, also known as the Eagle Brewery Office Building, is a historic office building located at Vincennes, Indiana. It was built in 1885, and is a two-story, Romanesque Revival style red brick building, with a 1 1/2-story rear addition built about 1910. It rests on a limestone foundation and has gable roofs on the two sections. The front facade features arched openings and raised carving of the Eagle Brewery emblem. The building housed brewery and later distillery offices into the 1950s, after which it was acquired by Vincennes University.

It was added to the National Register of Historic Places in 2003.
