= WAOV =

- Vincennes, Indiana; United States
- Frequency: 1450 kHz
- Branding: Knox County Today Newstalk

Programming
- Format: News Talk Information
- Affiliations: AP Radio, ESPN Radio, Premiere Radio Networks

Ownership
- Owner: Old Northwest Broadcasting, Inc.
- Sister stations: WWBL

History
- Former frequencies: 1420 kHz (1940–1941)

Technical information
- Licensing authority: FCC
- Facility ID: 50238
- Class: C
- Power: 1,000 watts
- Transmitter coordinates: 38°42′26.00″N 87°29′42.00″W
- Translators: 93.9 W220BQ (Bruceville); 97.3 W247CZ (Washington); 97.7 W249DC (Vincennes)

Links
- Public license information: Public file; LMS
- Website: waovam.com

WAOV (1450 AM) is a radio station broadcasting a News Talk Information format. Licensed to Vincennes, Indiana, United States, the station is currently owned by Old Northwest Broadcasting, Inc. and features programming from AP Radio, ESPN Radio and Premiere Radio Networks.

The call letters WAOV come from the popular 1900 novel Alice of Old Vincennes by Maurice Thompson and was adopted when the station originated in 1940.

WAOV Logo Before Translator Sign On

WAOV Previous Logo

== Notable former on-air staff ==
- David Goodnow
