= Vincennes Fortnightly Club =

- U.S. National Register of Historic Places
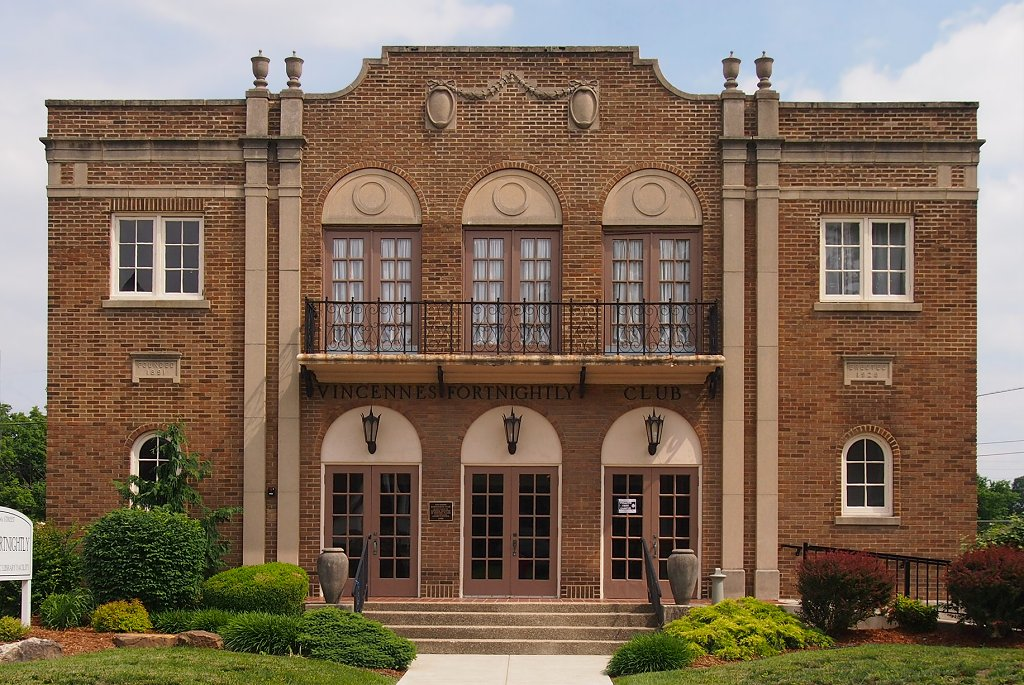
- Vincennes Fortnightly Club, June 2013

- Location within Indiana Location within the United States
- Location: 421 N. Sixth St., Vincennes, Indiana
- Coordinates: 38°40′45″N 87°31′31″W
- Area: less than one acre
- Built: 1928
- Architect: Routt, Lester
- Architectural style: Colonial Revival
- NRHP reference No.: 00001133
- Added to NRHP: September 22, 2000

Vincennes Fortnightly Club is a historic Women's club clubhouse located at Vincennes, Indiana. It was built in 1928, and is a two-story, Colonial Revival style brick and Indiana limestone building. The tripartite front facade features arched openings and a decorative metal railed balcony on the second floor. The dumbbell-shaped building consists of a main entrance block, auditorium, and rear stage section.

It was added to the National Register of Historic Places in 2000.
