= Steen Township, Knox County, Indiana =

Steen Township
- Township
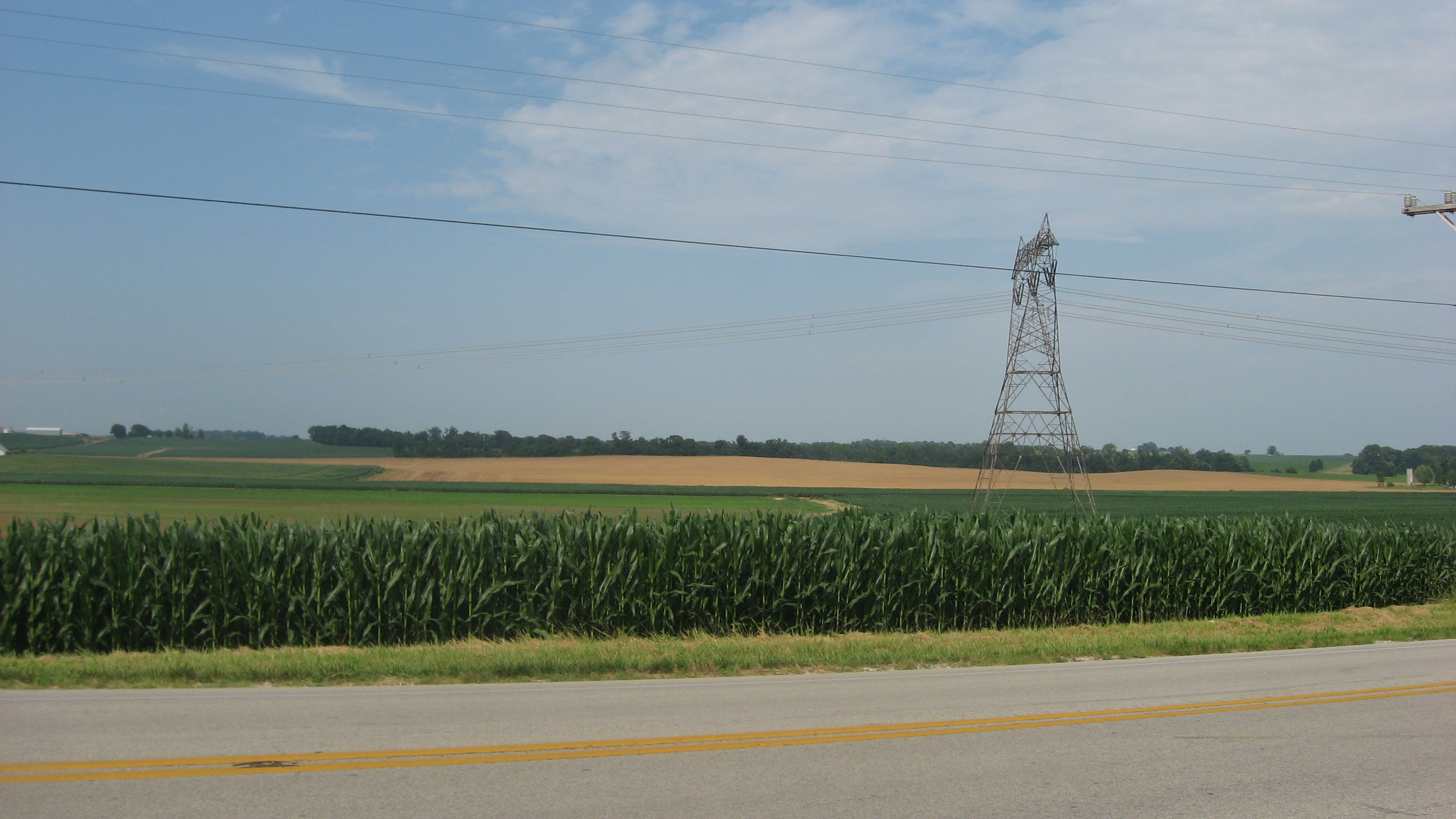
- Fields northwest of Wheatland

- Coordinates: 38°40′02″N 87°17′59″W
- Country: United States
- State: Indiana
- County: Knox

Government
  - Type: Indiana township

Area
  - Total: 36.91 sq mi (95.6 km^{2})
  - Land: 36.5 sq mi (95 km^{2})
  - Water: 0.42 sq mi (1.1 km^{2})
- Elevation: 479 ft (146 m)

Population (2020)
  - Total: 803
  - Density: 22.0/sq mi (8.49/km^{2})
- FIPS code: 18-72908
- GNIS feature ID: 453872

Steen Township is one of ten townships in Knox County, Indiana. As of the 2020 census, its population was 803 (down from 900 at 2010) and it contained 361 housing units.

Historical population
Census	Pop.	Note	%±
1890	1,355		—
1900	1,686		24.4%
1910	1,727		2.4%
1920	1,871		8.3%
1930	1,719		−8.1%
1940	1,484		−13.7%
1950	1,451		−2.2%
1960	1,264		−12.9%
1970	1,121		−11.3%
1980	1,071		−4.5%
1990	885		−17.4%
2000	929		5.0%
2010	900		−3.1%
2020	803		−10.8%
Source: US Decennial Census

== History ==
Steen Township was founded in 1857. It was named for Richard Steen, a pioneer settler.

Andrew Nicholson Farmstead was added to the National Register of Historic Places in 2005.

== Geography ==
According to the 2010 census, the township has a total area of 36.91 square miles (95.6 km^{2}), of which 36.5 square miles (95 km^{2}) (or 98.89%) is land and 0.42 square miles (1.1 km^{2}) (or 1.14%) is water.
