= Vincennes Township, Knox County, Indiana =

Vincennes Township
- Township
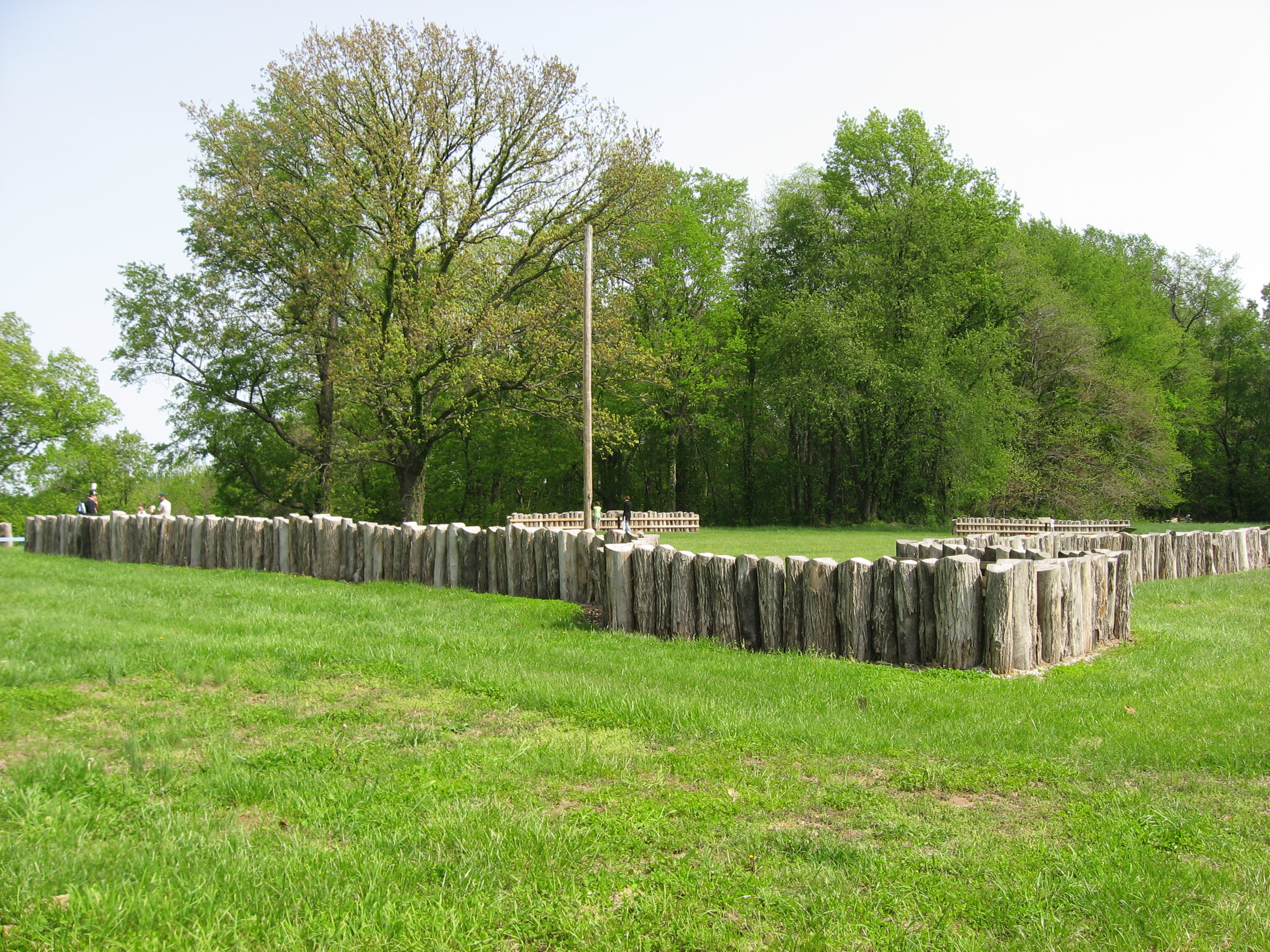
- Site of Fort Knox II in northern Vincennes Township

- Coordinates: 38°37′59″N 87°33′35″W
- Country: United States
- State: Indiana
- County: Knox
- Named for: Vincennes

Government
  - Type: Indiana township

Area
  - Total: 61.74 sq mi (159.9 km^{2})
  - Land: 60.08 sq mi (155.6 km^{2})
  - Water: 1.66 sq mi (4.3 km^{2})
- Elevation: 413 ft (126 m)

Population (2020)
  - Total: 21,899
  - Density: 364.5/sq mi (140.7/km^{2})
- FIPS code: 18-79217
- GNIS feature ID: 453961

Vincennes Township is one of ten townships in Knox County, Indiana. As of the 2020 census, its population was 21,899 (down from 23,707 at 2010) and it contained 10,087 housing units.

Historical population
Census	Pop.	Note	%±
1890	10,704		—
1900	12,816		19.7%
1910	17,654		37.7%
1920	19,750		11.9%
1930	20,867		5.7%
1940	21,972		5.3%
1950	23,364		6.3%
1960	23,689		1.4%
1970	24,803		4.7%
1980	24,945		0.6%
1990	24,365		−2.3%
2000	23,372		−4.1%
2010	23,707		1.4%
2020	21,899		−7.6%
Source: US Decennial Census

== Geography ==
According to the 2010 census, the township has a total area of 61.74 square miles (159.9 km^{2}), of which 60.08 square miles (155.6 km^{2}) (or 97.31%) is land and 1.66 square miles (4.3 km^{2}) (or 2.69%) is water.

== Education ==
It is in the Vincennes Community School Corporation.
