= Vincennes, Indiana =

- City
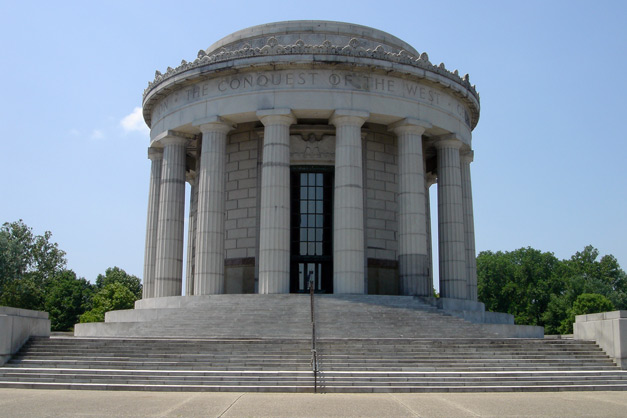
- The George Rogers Clark National Historical Park Rotunda

- Flag Seal

- Location of Vincennes in Knox County, Indiana
- Coordinates: 38°40′39″N 87°30′07″W
- Country: United States
- State: Indiana
- County: Knox
- Township: Vincennes
- Established: 1732
- Named for: François-Marie Bissot, Sieur de Vincennes

Government
  - Mayor: Joe Yochum

Area
  - Total: 7.48 sq mi (19.37 km^{2})
  - Land: 7.41 sq mi (19.19 km^{2})
  - Water: 0.069 sq mi (0.18 km^{2}) 0.94%
- Elevation: 420 ft (130 m)

Population (2020)
  - Total: 16,759
  - Density: 2,261.6/sq mi (873.19/km^{2})
- Time zone: UTC-5 (EST)
  - Summer (DST): UTC-4 (EDT)
- ZIP Code: 47591
- Area codes: 812 and 930
- FIPS code: 18-79208
- GNIS feature ID: 2397143
- Website: www.vincennes.org

Vincennes is a city in and the county seat of Knox County, Indiana, United States. It is located on the lower Wabash River in the southwestern part of the state, nearly halfway between Evansville and Terre Haute. It was founded in 1732 by French fur traders, including the namesake François-Marie Bissot, Sieur de Vincennes. It is the oldest continually inhabited European settlement in Indiana and was its longest serving territorial capital. It is one of the oldest settlements west of the Appalachians. The population was 16,759 at the 2020 census.

== History ==
The vicinity of Vincennes was inhabited for thousands of years by different cultures of indigenous peoples. During the Late Woodland period, some of these peoples used local loess hills as burial sites; some of the more prominent examples are the Sugar Loaf Mound and the Pyramid Mound. In historic times, prominent local Indian groups who drove these people out were the Shawnee, the Wabash, and the Miami.

The first European settlers were French, when Vincennes was founded as part of the French colony of Pays des Illinois, New France. Later on, it would be transferred to the colony of Louisiana. Several years later, France lost the French and Indian War (part of the Seven Years' War), and as a result ceded territory east of the Mississippi River, including Vincennes, to the victorious British.

Once the area was under British control, it was associated with the Province of Quebec until after the Revolutionary War. It then became part of the Illinois County of the Colony and Dominion of Virginia. Next it became part of Knox County in the Northwest Territory, and it was later included in the Indiana Territory. Vincennes served as capital of the Indiana Territory from 1800 until 1813, when the government was moved to Corydon.

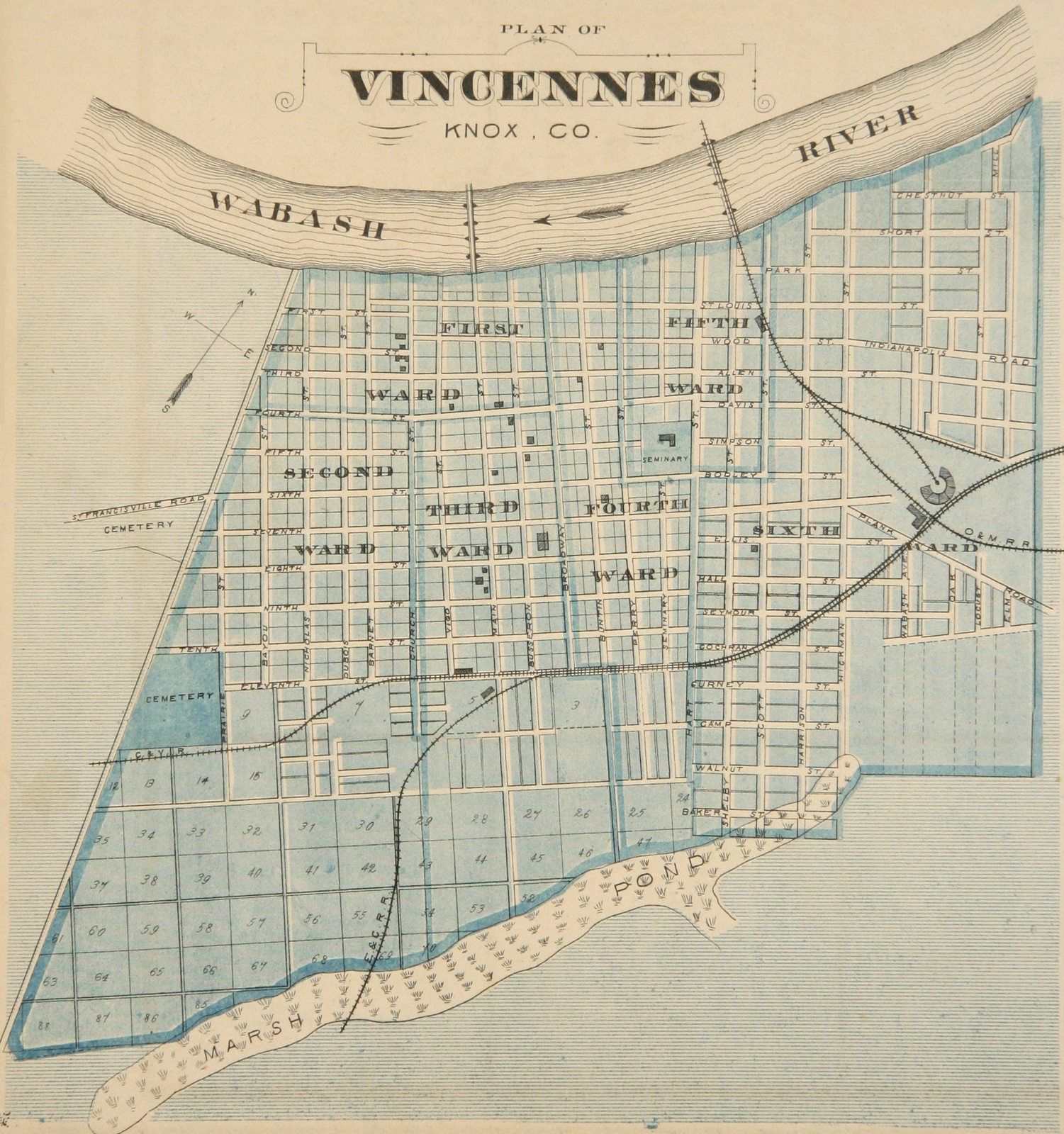
Map of Vincennes from 1876 atlas

=== New France ===
The first trading post on the Wabash River was established by Sieur Juchereau, Lieutenant General of Montréal. With thirty-four French Canadians, he founded the company post on October 28, 1702, to trade for Buffalo hides with American Indians. The exact location of Juchereau's trading post is not known, but because the Buffalo Trace crosses the Wabash at Vincennes, many believe it was here. The post was a success; in the first two years, the traders collected over 13,000 buffalo hides. When Juchereau died, the post was abandoned. The French Canadian settlers left what they considered hostile territory for Mobile (in present-day Alabama), which was the capital of Louisiana, New France.

The oldest European town in Indiana, Vincennes was officially established in 1732 as a second French fur trading post in this area. The French Indies Company commissioned a French officer, François-Marie Bissot, Sieur de Vincennes, to build a post along the Wabash River to discourage local nations from trading with the English. Vincennes founded the new trading post near the meeting points of the Wabash and White rivers, and the overland Buffalo Trace. Vincennes, who had lived with his father among the Miami tribe, persuaded the Piankeshaw to establish a village at his trading post. He also encouraged French Canadian settlers to move there, and started his own family to increase the village population. Because the Wabash post was so remote, however, Vincennes had a hard time getting trade supplies from Louisiana for the native nations, who were also being courted by English traders. The boundary between the French colonies of Louisiana and Canada, although inexact in the first years of the settlement, was decreed in 1745 to run between Fort Ouiatenon (below the site of modern-day Lafayette, Indiana) and Vincennes.

In 1736, during the French war with the Chickasaw nation, Vincennes was captured and burned at the stake near the present-day town of Fulton, Mississippi. His settlement on the Wabash was renamed Poste Vincennes in his honor.

Louisiana governor Jean-Baptiste Le Moyne, Sieur de Bienville, next appointed Louis Groston de Saint-Ange de Bellerive to command Poste Vincennes.

As the French colonists pushed north from Louisiana and south from Canada, however, the American colonists to the east continued to push west. In addition, British traders lured away many of the Indians who had traded with the Canadiens. This competition escalated in the Ohio Country until 1754 and the eruption of the French and Indian War (the North American theater of the Seven Years' War between Britain and France.)

=== British America ===
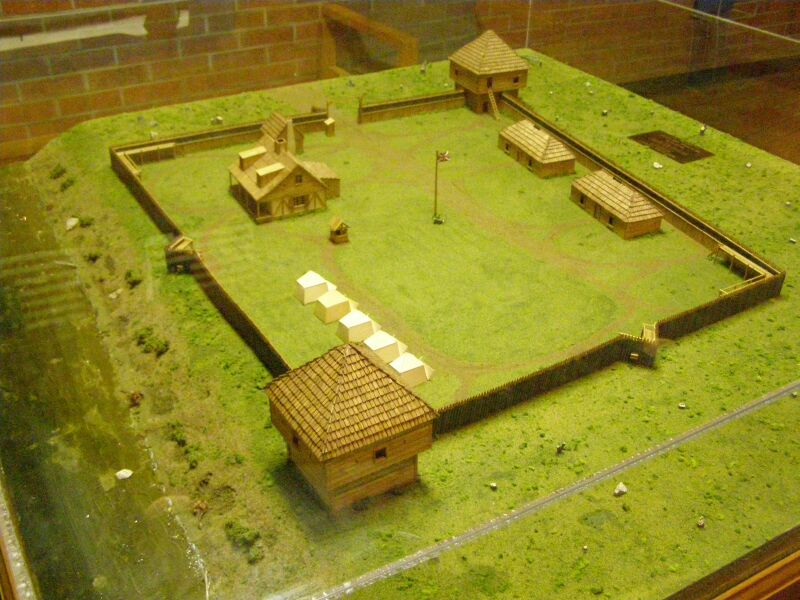
Diorama of Fort Sackville

On February 10, 1763, when New France was ceded to the British at the conclusion of the French and Indian War, Vincennes fell under the authority of Great Britain. British officer John Ramsey came to Vincennes in 1766. He took a census of the settlement, built up the fort, and renamed it Fort Sackville. The population grew quickly in the years that followed, resulting in a unique culture of interdependent Native Americans, Canadien settlers, and British traders.

Vincennes was far from centers of British power. In 1770 and 1772, Thomas Gage, the commander in chief of Britain's North American forces, received warnings that the residents of Vincennes were agitating against the Crown, and were inciting native tribes along the river trade routes to attack British traders. The Colonial Secretary, the Earl of Hillsborough, ordered the residents to be removed from Vincennes in response. Gage demurred while the residents responded to the charges against them, claiming to be "peaceful settlers, cultivating the land which His Most Christian Majesty [meaning the King of France] granted us." The issue was resolved by Hillsborough's successor, Lord Dartmouth, who insisted to Gage that the residents were not lawless vagabonds, but British subjects whose rights were protected by the Crown. Gage took no action against the residents of Vincennes. In 1778, residents at Poste Vincennes received word of the French alliance with the American Second Continental Congress from Father Pierre Gibault and Dr. Jean Laffont. They mobilized in support of the American revolutionaries, as did the local Piankeshaw, led by Chief Young Tobacco.

=== Revolutionary War ===
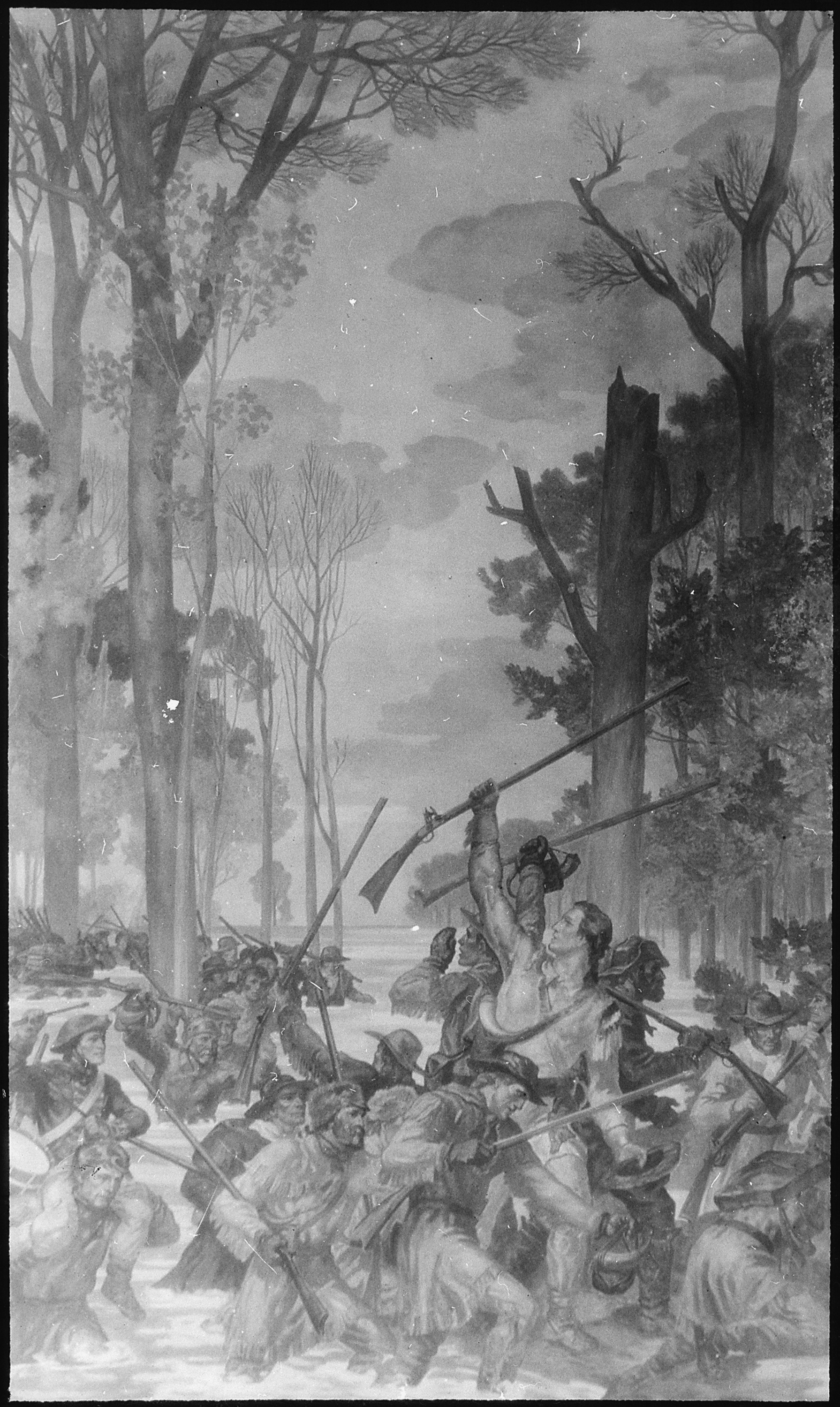
Clark's march against Vincennes, across the Wabash River through wilderness and flood, artist unknown, is from the National Archives and Records Administration.

Lieutenant Colonel George R. Clark, Captain Leonard Helm, and others created a plan to capture the French forts that the British occupied after Louisiana was ceded. After Kaskaskia was captured by Clark, Lieutenant Governor Henry Hamilton sent British soldiers and reinforcements from Detroit to Fort Vincennes and helped to rebuild the fort.

The Italian merchant and patriot Francis Vigo found Clark and informed the British presence at the fort. Vigo served with the patriots, ordered war supplies from the Spanish to help, and acted as a secret agent for the patriots. Clark rounded up enough men to outnumber the British and planned a surprise attack on Fort Vincennes in the heart of winter, a horrible time when no armies were expected to be able to attack due to illness, lack of food, and the flood waters that were high during this time. The patriots won the Battle of Vincennes on February 23–24, 1779. Hamilton thought of Vincennes as "a refuge for debtors and Vagabonds from Canada." George Rogers Clark recaptured Fort Sackville in the Battle of Vincennes without losing a single soldier.

=== Post-Revolution turmoil ===
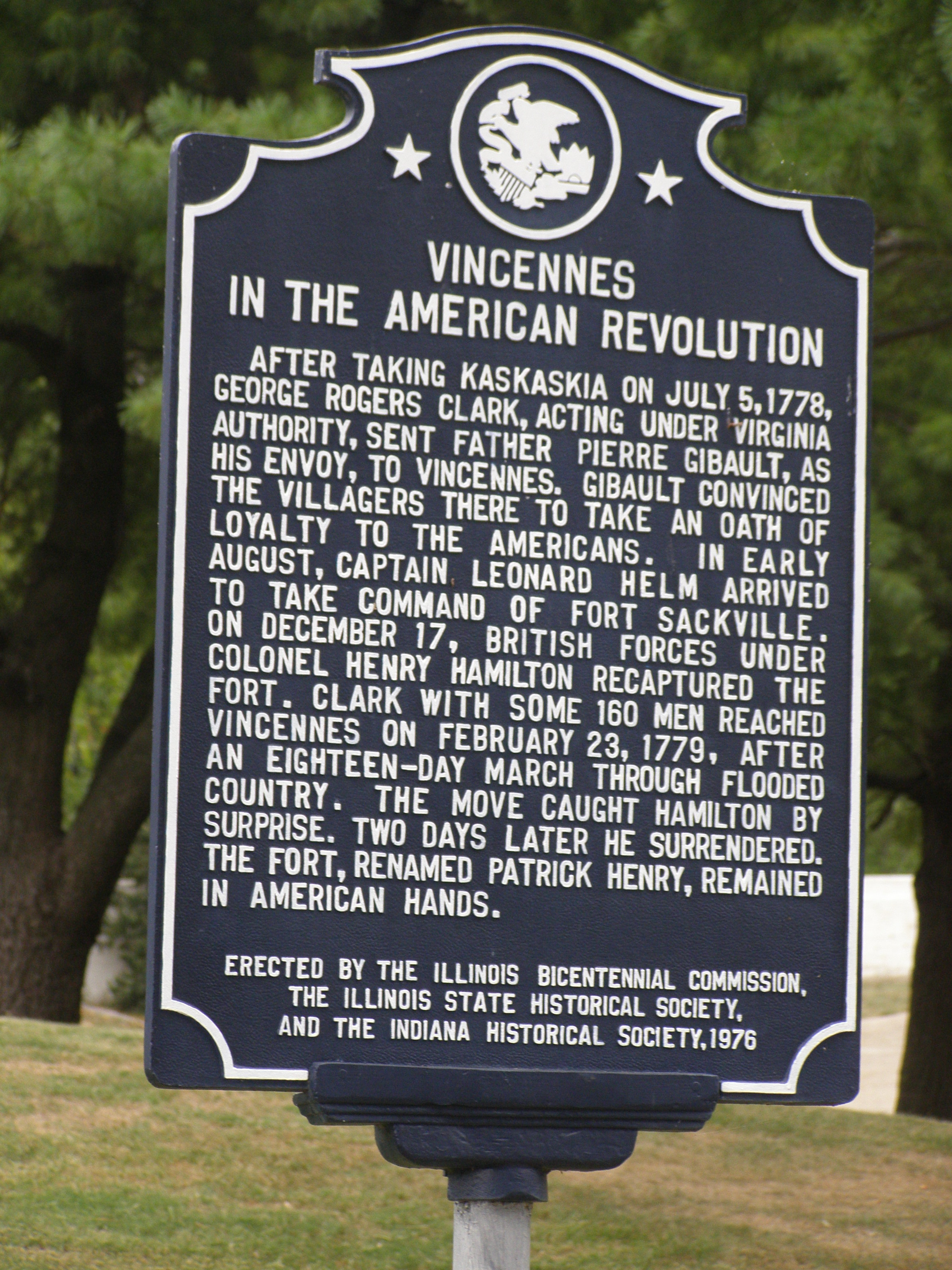
This American Revolutionary War historic memorial plaque is in Vincennes.

Although the Americans remained in control of Vincennes, it took years to establish peace. In 1786, Captain John Hardin led a mounted Kentucky militia across the Ohio River and destroyed a friendly Piankeshaw town near Vincennes. This led to a series of attacks and counter-attacks between Wabash Indians and American settlers. Finally, on July 15, 1786, the Wabash landed in 47 war canoes at Vincennes to drive the Americans back to Kentucky. The Indians warned the Canadians in advance of their attack and assured them that they would not be harmed, but the Canadians warned the Americans. They quickly supplied Fort Patrick Henry and waited out the siege. One American was killed and four wounded, and the war party left after destroying the Americans' farms.

In response, Virginia governor Patrick Henry authorized George Rogers Clark to raise the Kentucky militia and mount an expedition against the warring tribes. General Clark gathered a force of 1,000 militia and departed Clarksville September 9, 1786, along the Buffalo Trace. The militia spent ten days in Vincennes before marching north along the Wabash, but men deserted by the hundreds. Clark was soon forced to return to Vincennes without any action taken. Clark left 150 men to help defend Vincennes, but this force soon turned into a lawless mob, and the citizens of Vincennes petitioned Congress for help. Secretary of War Henry Knox sent Colonel Josiah Harmar and the First American Regiment to restore order. The Kentucky militia fled Vincennes at the approach of U.S. Regulars.

Colonel Harmar left 100 regulars under Major Jean François Hamtramck and directed them to build a fort, Fort Knox. Vincennes remained an isolated town, difficult to supply due to its position deep within Indian territory. Secure transport to and from Vincennes meant travelling with a large, armed party, whether over land or via the Wabash River. On September 30, 1790, Major Hamtramck led 350 men from Vincennes as far north as the Vermillion River, to engage some of the Indian villages which had been at war with Vincennes. The Kickapoo tracked the party, however, and evacuated every village along the way before the Americans arrived. Hamtramck destroyed some abandoned villages, but he did not engage any war parties. Faced with desertions from Kentucky militia, Hamtramck returned to Vincennes. The expedition had done no serious harm to the enemies of Vincennes, but it distracted some of the Wabash villages while Josiah Harmar, now a general, led a much larger expedition up through the Ohio Country towards Kekionga.

=== The Vincennes Tract ===
The earliest land claims by inhabitants of Vincennes were based on a sale by the Indians to the French in 1742 of a tract of land containing 1.6 million acres (6,500 km^{2}), known as the Vincennes Tract. It was a rectangular block lying at right angles to the course of the Wabash River at Vincennes. The tract was ceded by France to Britain by treaty in 1763 after the French and Indian War. On October 18, 1775, an agent for the Wabash Company purchased two tracts of land along the Wabash River from the Piankeshaw tribe called the 'Plankashaw Deed'. In these deeds, the Vincennes Tract was excepted, and it was the first recognition of the tract in period documents. Eventually, the United States Supreme Court invalidated the deeds.

The claims based on French sovereignty or individual deeds issued under it were eventually rejected by Congress, because if there were such grants, they passed to the United States by the Treaty of Paris 1783. By right of conquest, George Rogers Clark secured this land for the United States in 1779 and the Land Act of 1796 honored its boundaries.

The Vincennes Donation Lands were embodied in An Act for granting lands to the Inhabitants and settlers at Vincennes and the Illinois country, in the territory northwest of the Ohio, and for confirming them in their possessions (1791).

=== Growth ===
By 1798, the population had reached 2,500.

Elihu Stout published the first newspaper in the Indiana Territory in 1804 at Vincennes. The Indiana Gazette debuted on July 31, 1804. Fire destroyed the printing presses in 1806, but Stout revived the newspaper as the Western Sun in 1807.

Vincennes served as the first capital of Indiana Territory until it was moved to Corydon on May 1, 1813. Because of Vincennes' status as the capital of the Indiana Territory, it figured prominently in early Indiana-Illinois territorial and statehood policy. For example, on February 3, 1809, the 10th U.S. Congress passed legislation establishing the separate Indiana Territory in preparation for Indiana's proposed statehood. That act established the Indiana-Illinois border not with reference to a landmark along Lake Michigan near Chicago, but rather via direct reference to Vincennes: "all that part of the Indiana Territory which lies west of the Wabash river, and a direct line drawn from the said Wabash river and Post Vincennes, due north to the territorial line between the United States and Canada".

In 1826, "A party of Shawnee Indians ... in men, women, and children, to 500, passed through this place [Vincennes] ... from their reservation at Wapaghkonetta, moving to the Mississippi. The celebrated Indian prophet, and a son of the great Tecumseh, were in the company."

=== Slavery ===
Those who were pro-slavery tried to perform an end run around the Indiana constitution by putting in place indentured servitude under which slaves, in theory, appeared to be able to earn their freedom. However, the terms often placed on indentured servants were so excessive, many never actually never were able to achieve freedom.

— Rebecca R. Bibbs, It took two Supreme Court cases to end slavery in Indiana

Slavery was practiced in the 16th century, when the present-day state of Indiana was part of New France (1534–1763), by the French and Native Americans. When the area became part of the Northwest Territory, slavery was banned by the Northwest Ordinance of 1787, but slavery and indentured servitude continued. Slaveholders created a "loophole", that the provision did not apply to African Americans who were already enslaved in the state. In 1816, the Constitution of Indiana made forced labor illegal, stating that "there shall be neither slavery nor involuntary servitude in this state."

Polly Strong, an enslaved woman of Vincennes, was the plaintiff in a case that argued that she should be free. After losing in the Harrison County Circuit Court, she won the case at the Indiana Supreme Court on July 22, 1820, and she was freed. In the case of Clark's attorney appealed the decision with the Indiana Supreme Court in the case of Mary Clark v. G.W. Johnston was a former slave who was made an indentured servant and lived in Vincennes. She won her freedom on November 6, 1821, when the Indiana Supreme Court ruled that servitude violated the state's 1816 Constitution. This was a landmark contract law case for indentured servants and foretold the end of forced labor in Indiana.

=== Time zone controversy ===
On November 4, 2007, Knox County joined Daviess, Martin, Pike, and Dubois counties in returning to the Eastern Time zone. Controversy concerning time in Indiana has caused a change in the time zone of Vincennes on three different occasions since the Standard Time Act of 1918.

== Geography ==
Vincennes is located on the banks of the Wabash River at the western edge of Knox County. This is also the western edge of the state of Indiana, and Illinois is across the river to the west. The city lies about 100 miles (160 km) southwest of Indianapolis. U.S. Route 41 passes through the city from north to south, and U.S. Route 50 passes just to the north of the city from east to west.

According to the 2010 census, Vincennes has a total area of 7.478 square miles (19.37 km^{2}), of which 7.41 square miles (19.19 km^{2}) (or 99.09%) is land and 0.068 square miles (0.18 km^{2}) (or 0.91%) is water.

=== Climate ===
Vincennes has a humid subtropical climate with hot summers and cool winters with heavy rainfall at times throughout much of the year. There are an average of 53.1 days with highs of 90 °F (32 °C) or higher and an average of 101.5 days with lows of 32 °F (0 °C) or lower. Average January temperatures are a high of 36.3 °F (2.4 °C) and a low of 18.3 °F (−7.6 °C). Average July temperatures are a high of 87.7 °F (30.9 °C) and a low of 64.8 °F (18.2 °C). The record high temperature was 104 °F (40 °C) on June 26, 1988. The record low temperature was −26 °F (−32 °C) on January 19, 1994.

Average annual precipitation is 44.43 inches (112.9 cm). Measurable precipitation occurs on an average of 105.6 days each year. The wettest year was 1990 with 60.08 inches (152.6 cm) and the dryest year was 1988 with 36.02 inches (91.5 cm). The most precipitation in one month was 11.18 inches (28.4 cm) in November 1985. The most precipitation in 24 hours was 5.07 inches (12.9 cm).

Average annual snowfall is 5.8 inches (15 cm). Measurable snowfall occurs on only 2.6 days. The snowiest season was 1989–90 when 16.4 inches (42 cm) fell. The most snow in one month was 8.5 inches (22 cm) in December 1990. The most snow in 24 hours was 8.0 inches (20 cm) on March 24, 1990.

Climate data for Vincennes, Indiana, 1991–2020 normals, extremes 1894–present (Note: VINCENNES 4 E 1894–1981, VINCENNES 5 NE 1982–PRESENT)
Month	Jan	Feb	Mar	Apr	May	Jun	Jul	Aug	Sep	Oct	Nov	Dec	Year
Record high °F (°C)	76 (24)	79 (26)	89 (32)	94 (34)	100 (38)	107 (42)	111 (44)	108 (42)	106 (41)	97 (36)	87 (31)	75 (24)	111 (44)
Mean maximum °F (°C)	62.2 (16.8)	67.4 (19.7)	75.8 (24.3)	82.6 (28.1)	89.1 (31.7)	94.9 (34.9)	96.1 (35.6)	95.7 (35.4)	93.7 (34.3)	86.7 (30.4)	74.4 (23.6)	64.0 (17.8)	98.0 (36.7)
Mean daily maximum °F (°C)	39.7 (4.3)	44.6 (7.0)	55.1 (12.8)	67.3 (19.6)	77.1 (25.1)	85.6 (29.8)	88.7 (31.5)	87.8 (31.0)	82.3 (27.9)	70.3 (21.3)	55.8 (13.2)	44.1 (6.7)	66.5 (19.2)
Daily mean °F (°C)	30.6 (−0.8)	34.4 (1.3)	44.0 (6.7)	55.6 (13.1)	66.0 (18.9)	74.6 (23.7)	77.5 (25.3)	76.0 (24.4)	69.4 (20.8)	57.6 (14.2)	45.1 (7.3)	35.3 (1.8)	55.5 (13.1)
Mean daily minimum °F (°C)	21.6 (−5.8)	24.2 (−4.3)	32.9 (0.5)	43.9 (6.6)	54.8 (12.7)	63.6 (17.6)	66.4 (19.1)	64.3 (17.9)	56.5 (13.6)	45.0 (7.2)	34.5 (1.4)	26.4 (−3.1)	44.5 (7.0)
Mean minimum °F (°C)	0.0 (−17.8)	5.3 (−14.8)	15.6 (−9.1)	28.2 (−2.1)	38.6 (3.7)	50.0 (10.0)	55.6 (13.1)	53.9 (12.2)	41.6 (5.3)	29.7 (−1.3)	19.3 (−7.1)	7.5 (−13.6)	−3.0 (−19.4)
Record low °F (°C)	−26 (−32)	−19 (−28)	−10 (−23)	18 (−8)	30 (−1)	37 (3)	44 (7)	44 (7)	26 (−3)	14 (−10)	−1 (−18)	−21 (−29)	−26 (−32)
Average precipitation inches (mm)	2.98 (76)	2.53 (64)	3.57 (91)	4.88 (124)	5.53 (140)	4.82 (122)	4.61 (117)	3.31 (84)	3.63 (92)	3.57 (91)	3.98 (101)	3.35 (85)	46.76 (1,187)
Average snowfall inches (cm)	2.7 (6.9)	2.1 (5.3)	0.5 (1.3)	0.0 (0.0)	0.0 (0.0)	0.0 (0.0)	0.0 (0.0)	0.0 (0.0)	0.0 (0.0)	0.0 (0.0)	0.2 (0.51)	3.0 (7.6)	8.5 (21.61)
Average precipitation days (≥ 0.01 in)	9.0	8.2	10.5	11.3	12.5	10.6	9.7	8.0	7.6	8.5	9.4	10.1	115.4
Average snowy days (≥ 0.1 in)	1.9	1.6	0.7	0.0	0.0	0.0	0.0	0.0	0.0	0.0	0.2	1.3	5.7
Source 1: NOAA
Source 2: xmACIS2

== Demographics ==
Historical population
Census	Pop.	Note	%±
1850	2,070		—
1860	3,960		91.3%
1870	5,440		37.4%
1880	7,680		41.2%
1890	8,853		15.3%
1900	10,249		15.8%
1910	14,895		45.3%
1920	17,160		15.2%
1930	17,564		2.4%
1940	18,228		3.8%
1950	18,831		3.3%
1960	18,046		−4.2%
1970	19,867		10.1%
1980	20,857		5.0%
1990	19,859		−4.8%
2000	18,701		−5.8%
2010	18,423		−1.5%
2020	16,759		−9.0%
U.S. Decennial Census

=== 2020 census ===
As of the 2020 census, Vincennes had a population of 16,759. The median age was 36.8 years. 20.8% of residents were under the age of 18 and 17.8% of residents were 65 years of age or older. For every 100 females there were 97.4 males, and for every 100 females age 18 and over there were 96.7 males age 18 and over.

99.7% of residents lived in urban areas, while 0.3% lived in rural areas.

There were 7,062 households in Vincennes, of which 26.0% had children under the age of 18 living in them. Of all households, 34.7% were married-couple households, 22.5% were households with a male householder and no spouse or partner present, and 34.2% were households with a female householder and no spouse or partner present. About 37.9% of all households were made up of individuals and 15.1% had someone living alone who was 65 years of age or older.

There were 7,987 housing units, of which 11.6% were vacant. The homeowner vacancy rate was 2.0% and the rental vacancy rate was 11.8%.

Racial composition as of the 2020 census
Race	Number	Percent
White	14,846	88.6%
Black or African American	595	3.6%
American Indian and Alaska Native	49	0.3%
Asian	171	1.0%
Native Hawaiian and Other Pacific Islander	7	0.0%
Some other race	329	2.0%
Two or more races	762	4.5%
Hispanic or Latino (of any race)	680	4.1%

=== 2010 census ===
As of the census of 2010, there were 18,423 people, 7,407 households, and 4,108 families residing in the city. The population density was 2,486.2 inhabitants per square mile (959.9/km^{2}). There were 8,259 housing units at an average density of 1,114.6 per square mile (430.3/km^{2}). The racial makeup of the city was 91.9% White, 4.7% African American, 0.3% Native American, 0.7% Asian, 0.7% from other races, and 1.7% from two or more races. Hispanic or Latino of any race were 1.9% of the population.

There were 7,407 households, of which 26.6% had children under the age of 18 living with them, 36.8% were married couples living together, 14.1% had a female householder with no husband present, 4.5% had a male householder with no wife present, and 44.5% were non-families. 36.0% of all households were made up of individuals, and 14.1% had someone living alone who was 65 years of age or older. The average household size was 2.19 and the average family size was 2.83.

The median age in the city was 33 years. 19.2% of residents were under the age of 18; 20.8% were between the ages of 18 and 24; 21.4% were from 25 to 44; 23.6% were from 45 to 64; and 15% were 65 years of age or older. The gender makeup of the city was 50.3% male and 49.7% female.

=== 2000 census ===
As of the census of 2000, there were 18,701 people, 7,614 households, and 4,332 families residing in the city. The population density was 2,620.3 inhabitants per square mile (1,011.7/km^{2}). There were 8,574 housing units at an average density of 1,201.4 per square mile (463.9/km^{2}). The racial makeup of the city was 94.34% White, 3.28% African American, 0.25% Native American, 0.72% Asian, 0.06% Pacific Islander, 0.48% from other races, and 0.88% from two or more races. Hispanic or Latino of any race were 1.02% of the population.

There were 7,614 households, out of which 26.3% had children under the age of 18 living with them, 40.8% were married couples living together, 12.4% had a female householder with no husband present, and 43.1% were non-families. 35.8% of all households were made up of individuals, and 14.9% had someone living alone who was 65 years of age or older. The average household size was 2.20 and the average family size was 2.85.

In the city, the population was spread out, with 20.0% under the age of 18, 20.5% from 18 to 24, 24.0% from 25 to 44, 20.3% from 45 to 64, and 15.1% who were 65 years of age or older. The median age was 33 years. For every 100 females, there were 98.6 males. For every 100 females age 18 and over, there were 97.3 males.

The median income for a household in the city was $26,289, and the median income for a family was $35,424. Males had a median income of $27,029 versus $20,254 for females. The per capita income for the city was $14,993. About 15.0% of families and 20.7% of the population were below the poverty line, including 25.9% of those under age 18 and 12.7% of those age 65 or over.

== Education ==
=== K-12 education ===
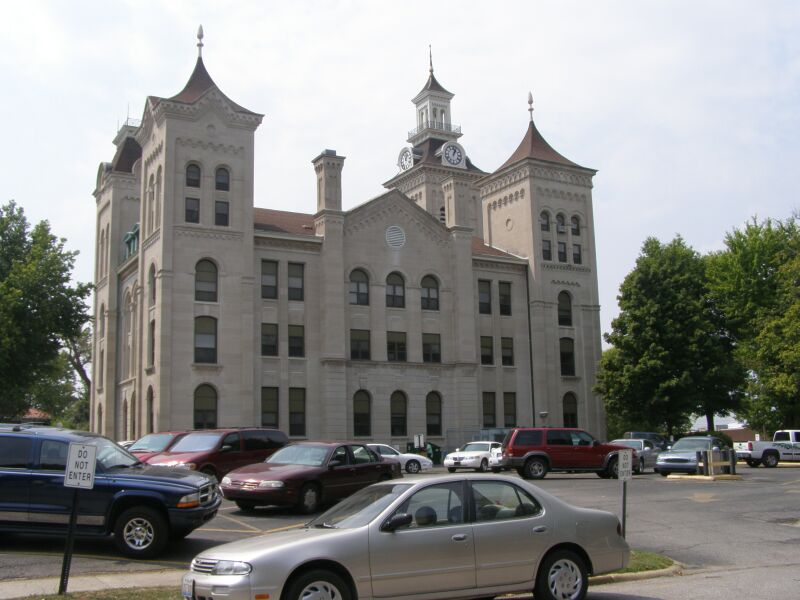
Knox County Courthouse

All of the Vincennes city limits is in the Vincennes Community School Corporation.

Public schools:

- Tecumseh – Harrison Elementary School
- Franklin Elementary School
- Francis Vigo Elementary School
- Riley Elementary School
- George Rogers Clark Middle School
- Lincoln High School

Washington Elementary closed in spring 2010.

South Knox Elementary School and South Knox Middle/High School, of the South Knox School Corporation, both have Vincennes postal addresses, but are not in the Vincennes city limits.

Parochial schools:

- Flaget Elementary (K–5)
- Vincennes Rivet High School (6–12)

Other private schools:

- Southwestern Indiana Youth Village (4–12) - It ended juvenile detention services in 2024.

=== Higher education ===
- Vincennes University was established in 1801 as Jefferson Academy. It is the oldest college of higher learning in Indiana.
- Purdue Polytechnic Institute maintains a satellite campus in Vincennes in a partnership with Vincennes University.

== Government ==
The city government consists of a seven-member city council, five of whom are elected from districts; the other two are elected at large. The mayor is elected in a citywide vote. Joe Yochum was first elected mayor in 2011 for a term that started in 2012. As of 2026 he is serving his fourth term. He is the longest-serving mayor in the history of Vincennes.

== Media ==
=== Television ===
- WVUT PBS (22) – 22.1 / 22.2 / 22.3 – Vincennes University

=== Radio ===
- 91.1 FM WVUB "Blazer 91-1" – Vincennes University
- 92.1 FM WZDM "Wisdom 92-1" – The Original Company
- 96.7 FM WFML –
- 1450 AM WAOV – The Original Company

=== Newspaper ===
- Vincennes Sun-Commercial

== Legacy ==
The Revolutionary War battle at Vincennes was featured in the 1901 novel Alice of Old Vincennes by Maurice Thompson. Four ships have also been named USS Vincennes in honor of this battle; as well as for the city. The first Vincennes was an 18-gun sloop-of-war commissioned in 1826 and sold in 1867. The second Vincennes was a New Orleans class heavy cruiser commissioned in 1937 and lost in the Battle of Savo Island in 1942. The third Vincennes was a Cleveland class light cruiser commissioned in 1944 and decommissioned in 1946. The fourth and most recent Vincennes was a Ticonderoga class guided missile cruiser commissioned in 1985 which was decommissioned and scrapped in 2005.

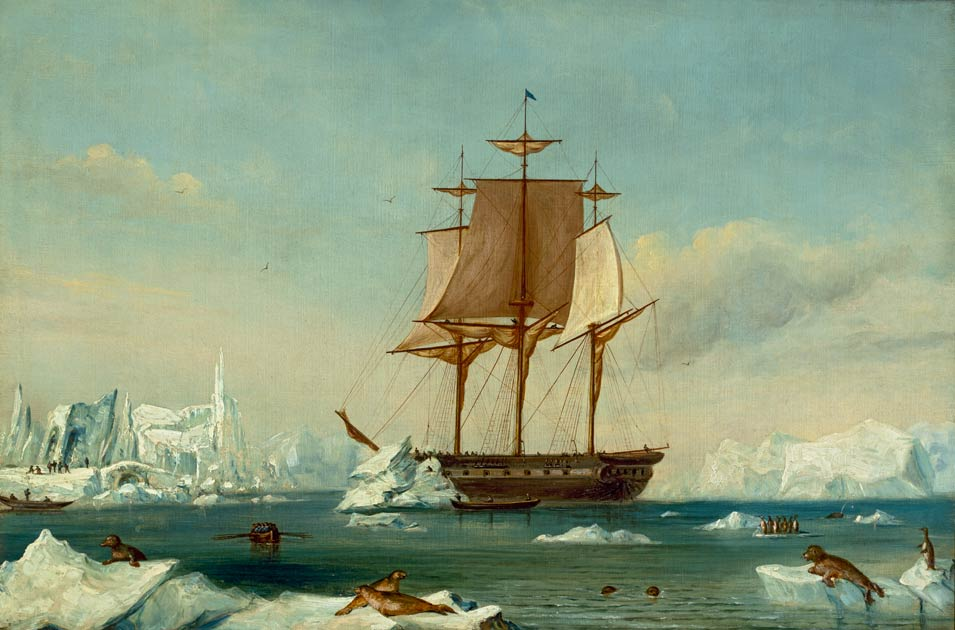
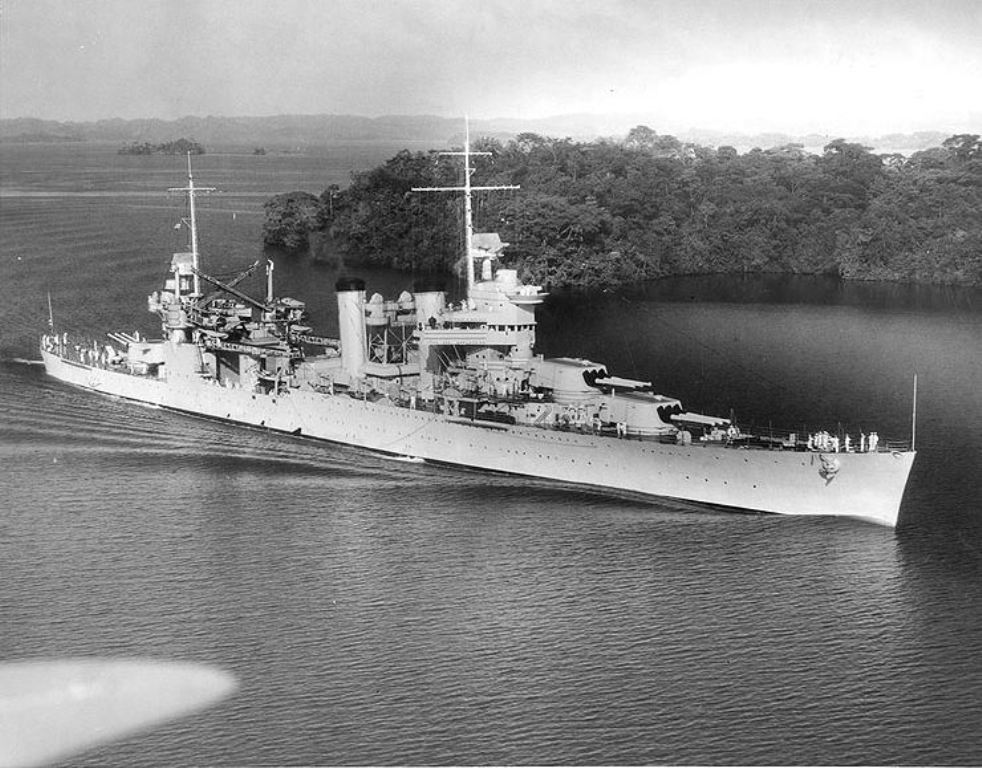
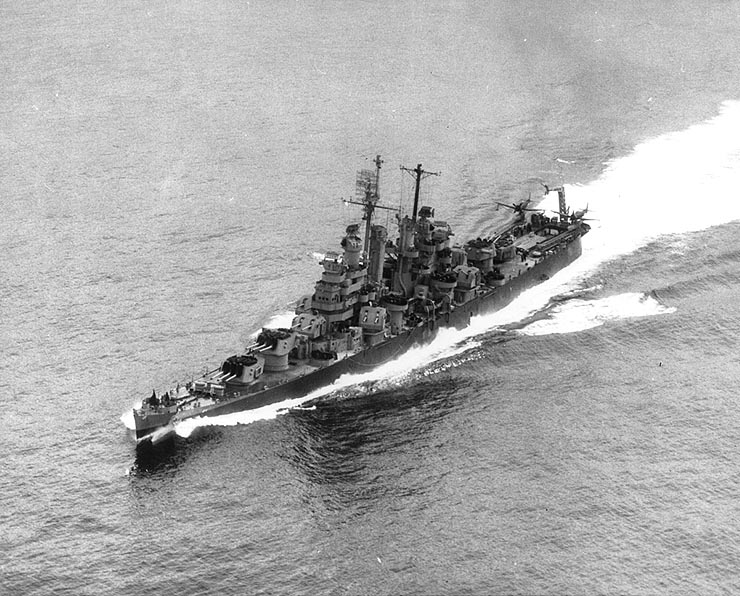
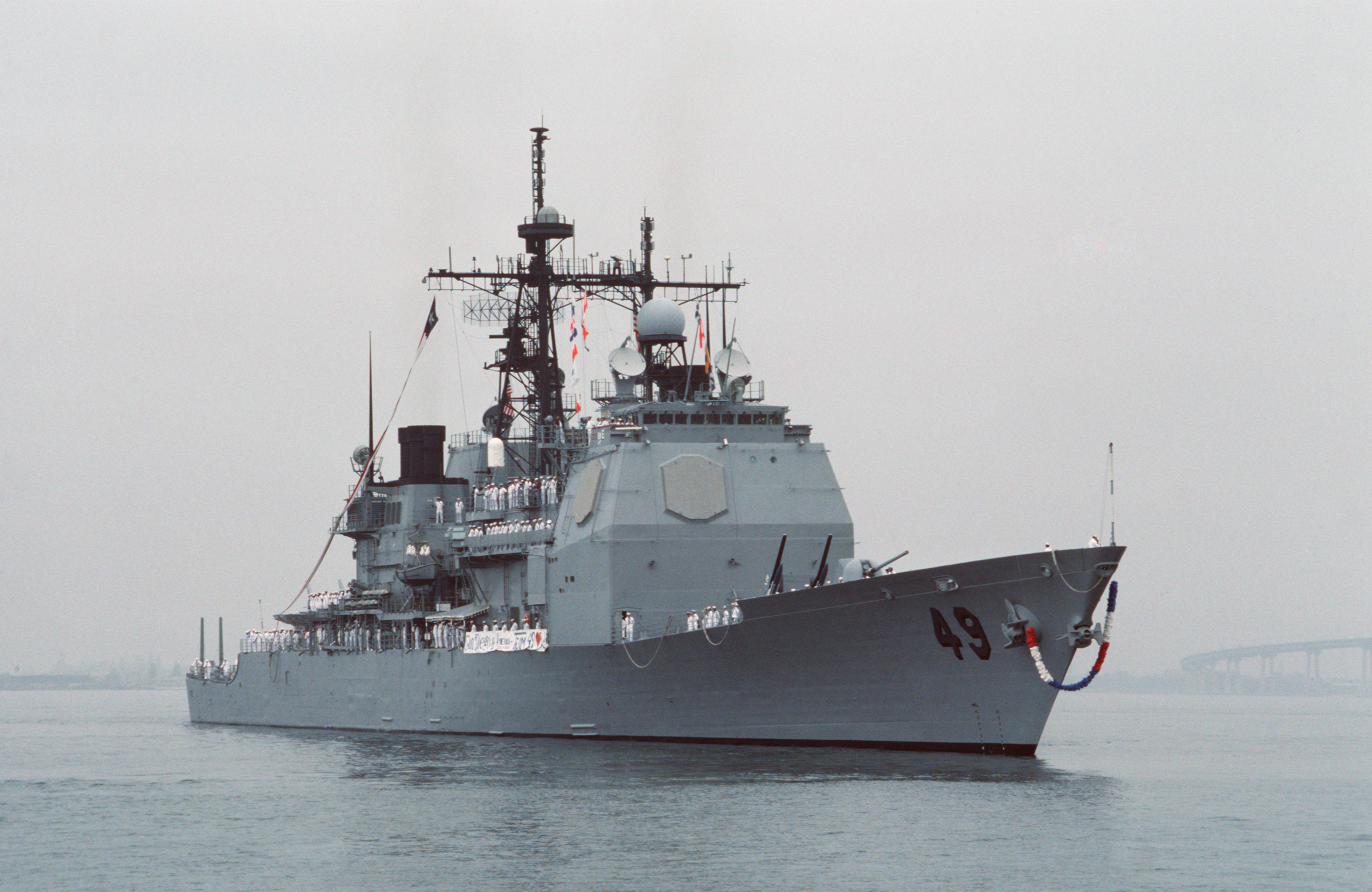
The four US Navy ships named Vincennes

== Notable people ==
- Bruce Barmes (1929–2014), baseball player, Washington Senators
- Clint Barmes (b. 1979), baseball player, San Diego Padres
- David Carter, retired football player, center and guard Houston Oilers
- E. Wallace Chadwick (1884–1969), U.S. congressman for Pennsylvania's 7th congressional district from 1947 to 1949
- Albert K. Dawson (1885–1967), photographer, film correspondent in World War I
- James C. Denny (1829–1887), Indiana Attorney General (1872–1874)
- Henry Dodge (1782–1867), U.S. senator from Wisconsin
- Mike Eskew, former chairman and CEO of UPS
- James Freeman Gilbert, geophysicist
- Bruce Bouillet, guitarist for Racer X
- David Goodnow, television news broadcaster
- William Henry Harrison (1773–1841), Indiana Territorial Governor and 9th President of the United States
- Mitch Henderson, basketball head coach, Princeton
- Charles T. Hinde, businessman and riverboat captain; briefly lived in Vincennes
- Jane Jarvis, (1915–2010), organist for the New York Mets and jazz musician
- Buck Jones (1891–1942), actor, silent and 1930s film star
- John Rice Jones, politician and jurist
- Stanislaus P. La Lumiere, president of Marquette University
- Julian Morgenstern (1881–1976), rabbi, professor, and president of Hebrew Union College
- Alvy Moore (1921–1997), actor
- Curtis Painter (b. 1985) football player, quarterback Purdue University, Indianapolis Colts, Baltimore Ravens, New York Giants
- William Edward Phipps, film and television actor, born in Vincennes
- Ollie Pickering (1870–1952), first batter in MLB American League history; lived and died in Vincennes
- Adam Schenk (b. 1992), professional golfer on the PGA Tour
- Red Skelton (1913–1997), comedian and film actor, star of The Red Skelton Show
- Richard L. Stevens, brigadier general, U.S. Army Corps of Engineers
- Dan Stryzinski, football player, punter for Indiana University and eight NFL teams
- Sarah Knox Taylor (1814–1835), daughter of Zachary Taylor and first wife of Jefferson Davis
- Waller Taylor, lawyer, Adjutant General, United States Senator from Indiana
- Alice Terry (1899–1987), actress and director, silent films; wife of director Rex Ingram
- Samuel Williams (1851–1913), judge and politician
- Benjamin Willoughby (1855–1940), Justice of the Indiana Supreme Court

== Points of interest ==
- George Rogers Clark National Historical Park, the memorial and park built for the war hero George Rogers Clark.

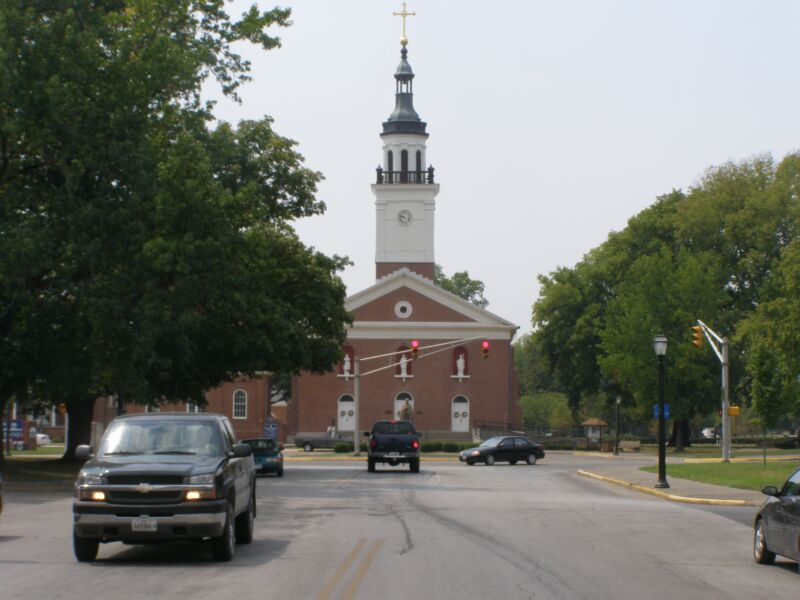
Xavier Cathedral

- St. Francis Xavier Cathedral and Library, the oldest Catholic church in the state of Indiana and Indiana's oldest library.
- Grand Rapids Dam was once a dam on the Wabash River near present-day Vincennes; its remains are still visible.
- Grouseland, the mansion home of William Henry Harrison, 9th United States president.
- Fort Knox II: Operated by the Indiana State Museum and Historic Sites Corp, Fort Knox was the jumping off point for the Tippecanoe Campaign in 1811. Outline of the fort is marked for self-guided tours.
- Fort Sackville, one of the forts of Vincennes.
- The U.S. Navy has named four ships in honor of Vincennes.
- The Servant of God, Bishop Simon Bruté de Remur, first Catholic Bishop of the Diocese of Vincennes.
- The Indiana Territorial Capitol. Is the primary site owned by the Indiana State Museum and Historic Sites Corp in Vincennes. The building was once the center of government for the Indiana Territory from 1800 to 1813.
- The Indiana Military Museum (indianamilitarymuseum.org)
- Pantheon Theatre
- The Red Skelton Museum of American Comedy on the campus of Vincennes University contains memorabilia of radio, TV, and movie star Red Skelton, who was born in Vincennes. As of 2017, his birth home still exists, but is in private hands.
- In addition to the George Rogers Clark National Historical Park, St. Francis Xavier Cathedral and Library, Grouseland, Fort Knox II, and Indiana Territorial Capitol, Gregg Park, Hack and Simon Office Building, Kimmell Park, Old State Bank, Pyramid Mound, Vincennes Fortnightly Club, and the Vincennes Historic District are listed on the National Register of Historic Places.

== Sister cities ==
Vincennes has three sister cities. Listed alphabetically, they are:

- Ovruch, Ukraine
- Vincennes, France
- Wasserburg am Inn, Germany

== See also ==
- Indiana Territory
- Forts of Vincennes, Indiana
- Grand Rapids Dam
- Grand Rapids Hotel
- Piankashaw Indians
- USS Vincennes, 4 ships
