= List of Indiana state historical markers in Martin County =

Location of Martin County in Indiana

This is a list of the Indiana state historical markers in Martin County.

This is intended to be a detailed table of the official state historical marker placed in Martin County, Indiana, United States by the Indiana Historical Bureau. The location of the historical marker and its latitude and longitude coordinates are included below when available, along with its name, year of placement, and topics as recorded by the Historical Bureau. There is 1 historical marker located in Martin County.

== Historical markers ==
| Marker title | Image | Year placed | Location | Topics |
|---|---|---|---|---|
| Site of Hindostan (.6 mile south) | | 1966 | Southeastern corner of the junction of State Road 550 and County Road 55, near Hindostan Falls and Loogootee; 38°37′57″N 86°51′3″W | Historic District, Neighborhoods, and Towns |

== See also ==
- List of Indiana state historical markers
- National Register of Historic Places listings in Martin County, Indiana
