= Indiana State Road 645 =

State highway in Indiana, United States

State Road 645
- SR 645 highlighted in red

Route information
- Maintained by INDOT
- Length: 1.969 mi (3.169 km)

Major junctions
- West end: US 231 in Madison Township
- East end: Naval Surface Warfare Center Crane Division in Perry Township

Location
- Country: United States
- State: Indiana
- Counties: Daviess, Martin

Highway system
- Indiana State Highway System; Interstate; US; State; Scenic
← SR 641	→ SR 650

State Road 645 (SR 645) is a state road in the southern section of the U.S. state of Indiana. Running for about 2 miles (3.2 km) in a general east–west direction, connecting Naval Surface Warfare Center Crane Division to U.S. Route 231 (US 231). SR 645 was originally introduced as small part of a much longer SR 58 in 1931. During the early 1940s SR 58 and SR 45 were rerouted around Crane Naval Ammunition Depot. SR 645 was commissioned in the early 1950s.

== Route description ==
SR 645 begins at an intersection with US 231 and runs towards the east. The road passes through woodland with some farmland on its way towards the unincorporated census-designated place of Burns City. In Burns City the road passes houses as the main road. The highway leaves Burns City and quickly meets an entrance to the Naval Surface Warfare Center Crane Division. The SR 645 designation ends at the entrance to the Naval Surface Warfare Center and the roadway continues northeasterly through the Naval Surface Warfare Center. The traffic count on SR 645 is 1,624 vehicles travel the highway on average each day in 2016.

== History ==
In 1931, the Indiana State Highway Commission added SR 58 between Elnora and Burns City, running along the modern route of SR 645. The state highway commission rerouted SR 58 and SR 45 around Crane Naval Ammunition Depot started in 1941 and finished in 1943. This reroute removed a state road designation from the modern SR 645 routing. The SR 645 designation was added to its modern routing between 1952 and 1953.

== Major intersections ==
County	Location	mi	km	Destinations	Notes
Daviess	Madison Township	0.000	0.000	US 231	Western terminus of SR 645
Martin	Perry Township	1.969	3.169	Naval Surface Warfare Center Crane Division	Eastern terminus of SR 645
1.000 mi = 1.609 km; 1.000 km = 0.621 mi
