= Vic Aldridge =

American baseball player (1893–1973)

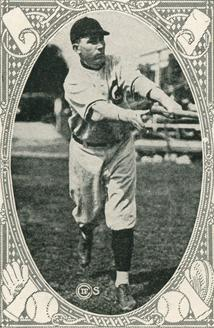
- Pitcher
- Born: October 25, 1893; Cale, Indiana, U.S.
- Died: April 17, 1973 (aged 79); Terre Haute, Indiana, U.S.
- Batted: Right Threw: Right

MLB debut
- April 15, 1917, for the Chicago Cubs

Last MLB appearance
- August 29, 1928, for the New York Giants

MLB statistics
- Win–loss record: 97–80
- Earned run average: 3.76
- Strikeouts: 526
- Stats at Baseball Reference

Teams
- Chicago Cubs (1917–1918, 1922–1924); Pittsburgh Pirates (1925–1927); New York Giants (1928)

Career highlights and awards
- World Series Champion (1925)

Victor Aldridge (October 25, 1893 – April 17, 1973), nicknamed "the Hoosier Schoolmaster", was an American right-handed pitcher in Major League Baseball who played for the Chicago Cubs, Pittsburgh Pirates and New York Giants, and was known to be an excellent curveball pitcher. Before his playing career he was a schoolmaster, hence his nickname. His most significant actions as a player occurred during the 1925 World Series, where Aldridge completed and won games two and five, only to have the most disastrous first inning in the seventh game of the World Series ever. After his retirement from baseball, he served as a state senator in the Indiana General Assembly. Aldridge is a member of the Indiana Baseball Hall of Fame, inducted in 2007.

== Personal life ==
Born in the small country town of Cale, Indiana, Vic Aldridge attended the Tempy primary school in Cale, Indiana which was a short walk from his home. He attended high school in Trinity Springs, Indiana where he played baseball on the Trinity Springs team. He graduated from Trinity Springs, Indiana. He then attended Central Normal College in Danville, Indiana. In 1914–1915 he taught school at the Pea Ridge School in Trinity Springs, Indiana. He also taught school in Miami County Indiana. He was married to Cleta B. Wadsworth of Indian Springs, Indiana.

== Early career ==
Aldridge was a dependable second or third starter throughout most of his career. He was known for his curveball and pinpoint accuracy. Aldridge batted and threw right-handed. He began his pro career by signing a contract with Indianapolis of the American Association in 1915, but first played for Denver of the Western League and then Erie of the Central League. He played for Indianapolis in 1916 where he was scouted for the Chicago Cubs. He was sold to the Cubs on August 28, 1916.

Aldridge spent 1917 and 1918 with the Chicago Cubs, serving in the bullpen. In 1917 Aldridge played in thirty games, winning six games and losing six, with a 3.12 earned run average and two saves. In 1918 he played only three games, pitching only twelve innings, before joining the United States Navy during the final year of World War I. After returning from the war, he played for the Los Angeles Angels, an affiliate of the Cubs, in the Pacific Coast League. Aldridge returned to the Cubs for the 1922 season. He played the next three years for Chicago, with consistent performances. In 1922, 1923 and 1924 he played 36, 30 and 32 games respectively, with 16, 16 and 15 wins in the three seasons, with respective earned run averages of 3.52, 3.48 and 3.50. During this time his son Vic Aldridge Jr. served unofficially as the Cubs batboy and even had a uniform donated by Mordecai Brown so he would look the part. In 1923 he was ejected from a game.

== 1925 ==
Vic Aldridge was traded to the Pittsburgh Pirates after the 1924 season on October 27, 1924, along with George Grantham and Al Niehaus, for Wilbur Cooper, Charlie Grimm and Rabbit Maranville. The change in stadiums prompted him to rely more on his fastball than his curveball, as he felt he needed to protect himself from home runs in Wrigley Field and its smaller field, thus using the curveball to reduce the risk of being homered against, but the larger field in Pittsburgh made fastballs safer to use, and thus a better pitch to rely upon. The next year, Aldridge won fifteen games (ninth highest total in the National League in 1925) and lost seven, for a .682 winning percentage that was the fourth highest for any NL pitcher that year. His finest moments were in the postseason that year when he pitched two complete game victories against the Washington Senators as the Pirates won the World Series. He won Game 2 of the series 3–2 on October 8, and Game 5 by a score of 6–3, the first two Pirates wins of the Series. Aldridge used the money from the World Series to buy a home in Terre Haute, Indiana.

Aldridge also started the seventh game on October 15. It had been raining for a week in Pittsburgh, and the sixth game had been rainy. The weather for the seventh was even worse, and the game was played in thick pea soup fog and drizzle, with a very wet pitching mound. It was hoped that Aldridge would continue his success in the first two games to the seventh, but it was not to be. Although noted for his consistency, in this game Aldridge was very wild; he had had only two days rest and he kept slipping on the slick pitcher's plate. Sam Rice was the first batter, and he hit a single. Then Bucky Harris came out, whose fly out was the only success Aldridge had during the game. Goose Goslin was walked after a wild pitch. Joe Harris was walked after a wild pitch advanced the baserunners. After a full count, Joe Judge was walked, scoring in one run. Then Ossie Bluege hit a single. Pirates manager Bill McKechnie had seen enough and relieved Aldridge. In total, Aldridge gave up three walks, two hits and two wild pitches, resulting in the Senators having a 4–0 lead in the first inning. The Pirates would rally to win the game and the World Series by a score of 9–7, the first time a team won the World Series after a 3–1 deficit. It was the worst start of the seventh game for a pitcher in Series history.

== Late career ==
The 1925 proved to be the pinnacle of Aldridge's career. In 1926 he suffered a record of 10 wins and 13 losses, with a 4.07 earned run average. The year 1927 was better for Aldridge. He won fifteen games, losing only ten, with a 4.25 earned run average. Aldridge also played in the 1927 World Series, losing the second game of the series 6–2 as Babe Ruth and Lou Gehrig led the New York Yankees to a sweep of the Pirates in four games. He gave up all six runs in the 7 1/3 innings he pitched. After several other players had ghostwritten newspaper articles for the Christy Walsh Syndicate, he wrote an article for a Pittsburgh newspaper, who bragged that it was Aldridge himself who wrote it.

After winning 15 games again in 1927, Aldridge expected a raise, but instead Pittsburgh owner Barney Dreyfuss traded him to the New York Giants on February 11, 1928, for Burleigh Grimes, citing Aldridge's 4.25 ERA in 1927 as a reason not to give him a raise. He held out for much of the year; by the time he returned, he was out of shape and pitched poorly. During the time Aldridge refused to report, Giants manager John McGraw threatened Aldridge with less pay, and at one point tried to trade him to the Cincinnati Reds. After the season, in which Aldridge's record was four wins and seven losses with a 4.83 earned run average after 119 innings pitched, he was sent to the Brooklyn Dodgers. However, Aldridge refused to report and retired from baseball instead. His final game was on August 29, 1928.

In total, Aldridge pitched 1,601 innings, won 97 games and lost 80, had 102 complete games and a combined earned run average of 3.76. Rogers Hornsby said that Aldridge had one of the three best curveballs he had ever seen, a curveball described by the Baseball Magazine as a "hard, sharp-breaking curve" that was one of the best curveballs in all of baseball. He also threw a screwball. His batting average was .229 (133-for-581), a respectable average for a pitcher. He hit two home runs with 60 RBI. Aldridge twice attempted to steal a base, once each in 1922 and 1926, and succeeded both times.

== Post career ==
After his playing career ended, Aldridge attended law school at the Voorhees School of Law and served in the Indiana State Senate from 1937 to 1948. He was first elected on November 4, 1936, as a Democrat. He served as a schoolmaster full-time before his baseball career, hence his nickname "The Hoosier Schoolmaster".

Aldridge died in Terre Haute at age 79, and is buried in the New Trinity Springs Cemetery of Trinity Springs, Indiana. He was inducted into the Indiana Baseball Hall of Fame on January 19, 2007, as its 131st member; his granddaughter, Mary Turner, and grandson, Vic Aldridge III, accepted the award on his behalf.

Indiana Senate
Preceded by Charles Jacob Kolsem	Member of the Indiana Senate from Vigo County; November 4, 1936 – November 3, 1948	Succeeded by Leonard Francis Conrad
