= National Register of Historic Places listings in Martin County, Indiana =

Location of Martin County in Indiana

This is a detailed table of the National Register of Historic Places listing in Martin County, Indiana.

This is intended to be a detailed table of the property on the National Register of Historic Places in Martin County, Indiana, United States. Latitude and longitude coordinates are provided for many National Register properties and districts; these locations may be seen together in a map.

There are three properties listed on the National Register in the county.

This National Park Service list is complete through NPS recent listings posted September 26, 2025.

== Current listing ==
	Name on the Register	Image	Date listed	Location	City or town	Description
1	Loogootee Commercial Historic District	Loogootee Commercial Historic District	September 2, 2025 (#100012179)	Each side of John F. Kennedy Ave. between Vincennes/Butcher and Railroad Streets, extending northeast/southeast to NE & NW 1st Streets south of Wood Street; 38°40′36″N 86°54′51″W	Loogootee	
2	Martin County Courthouse	Martin County Courthouse	June 17, 2005 (#05000604)	220 Capital Ave. 38°40′11″N 86°47′51″W	Shoals	
3	Shoals Historic District	Shoals Historic District	December 27, 2016 (#16000906)	Roughly bounded by White R., 7th, 1st & High Sts. 38°39′59″N 86°47′28″W	Shoals	

== See also ==
- List of National Historic Landmarks in Indiana
- National Register of Historic Places listings in Indiana
- Listings in neighboring counties: Daviess, Dubois, Greene, Lawrence, Orange
- List of Indiana state historical markers in Martin County
