= Dover Hill =

Dover Hill can refer to:

- Dover Hill, Indiana, a town in the United States
- SS Dover Hill, a UK cargo ship completed in 1918 as SS Clan Macvicar, renamed SS Dover Hill in 1936 and scuttled in the Normandy landings in 1944
- SS Empire Nairobi, a UK Empire ship built in 1945, renamed SS Dover Hill in 1946, renamed five more times before being scrapped in 1968
