= Indiana State Road 650 =

State highway in Indiana, United States

State Road 650
- SR 650 highlighted in red

Route information
- Maintained by INDOT
- Length: 0.879 mi (1,415 m)

Major junctions
- West end: US 50 in Halbert Township
- East end: USG Corporation plant in Halbert Township

Location
- Country: United States
- State: Indiana
- Counties: Martin

Highway system
- Indiana State Highway System; Interstate; US; State; Scenic
| ← SR 645 | → SR 662 |

State Road 650 (SR 650) is a State Road in the southern section of the state of Indiana. Running for about 0.9 miles (1.4 km) in a general northwest–southeast direction, connecting U.S. Route 50 (US 50) and a USG Corporation plant. The highway is entirely within Martin County and its eastern end is located at the plant's entrance. SR 650 was originally introduced in the mid-1950s.

== Route description ==
SR 650 begins at a four-way intersection with US 50. North of the intersection, the road becomes the main entrance to Martin State Forest. SR 650 heads south from the intersection but curves shortly afterward to head east-southeast. The road passes through wooded areas and over a CSX railroad track. After crossing a tributary of the White River, the road ends at the entrance to the USG plant. SR 650 is an undivided two-lane road for its entire length. In 2014 the only location for a traffic count along SR 650 shows that 838 vehicles travel the highway on average each day.

== History ==
SR 650 was added to the state road system between 1953 and 1956, as a paved highway. No major changes have occurred to SR 650 since it was added to the state road system.

== Major junctions ==
The entire route is in Halbert Township, Martin County.

| mi | km | Destinations | Notes |
|---|---|---|---|
| 0.000 | 0.000 | US 50 | Western terminus of SR 650 |
| 0.879 | 1.415 | Deep Cut Lake Road | USG Corporation plant; eastern terminus of SR 650 |
1.000 mi = 1.609 km; 1.000 km = 0.621 mi
