= Rutherford Township =

Rutherford Township may refer to:

- Rutherford Township, now part of Killarney, Ontario, Canada
- Rutherford Township, Martin County, Indiana, United States
