= Burns City, Indiana =

- Census-designated place
- Location in Martin County, Indiana
- Coordinates: 38°49′13″N 86°53′33″W
- Country: United States
- State: Indiana
- County: Martin
- Township: Perry

Area
  - Total: 0.74 sq mi (1.92 km^{2})
  - Land: 0.73 sq mi (1.90 km^{2})
  - Water: 0.0039 sq mi (0.01 km^{2})
- Elevation: 689 ft (210 m)

Population (2020)
  - Total: 114
  - Density: 155.2/sq mi (59.91/km^{2})
- Time zone: UTC-5 (Eastern (EST))
  - Summer (DST): UTC-4 (EDT)
- ZIP code: 47553 (Loogootee)
- Area codes: 812, 930
- GNIS feature ID: 2583447

Burns City is an unincorporated community and census-designated place (CDP) in Perry Township, Martin County, in the U.S. state of Indiana. The population was 114 at the 2020 census.

== History ==
The town was founded as "Keck's Church" in 1849 by Christian Keck, an early settler. It became known as "Kecksville" circa 1852. The name was officially changed to Burns City on September 15, 1890. The present name was applied by a railroad engineer whose wife's maiden name was Burns.

A post office was established under the name "Keck's Church" in 1849, was renamed Burns City in 1890, and remained in operation until it was discontinued in 1957.

== Geography ==
Burns City is bordered to the east by the Naval Surface Warfare Center Crane Division. Indiana State Road 645 has its eastern terminus in Burns City and leads west 1.7 miles (2.7 km) to U.S. Route 231 in Daviess County.

According to the U.S. Census Bureau, the Burns City CDP has a total area of 0.74 square miles (1.92 km^{2}), of which 0.005 square miles (0.013 km^{2}), or 0.68%, are water. The town sits on a ridge which drains north to a tributary of First Creek, which flows northwest to the White River near Newberry; and south to Seed Tick Creek, a tributary of Boggs Creek, which continues south to the East Fork of the White River east of Loogootee.

== Demographics ==
Historical population
Census	Pop.	Note	%±
2010	117		—
2020	114		−2.6%
U.S. Decennial Census
