= Shoals High School =

Location
- 7900 US-50; Shoals, Indiana 47581; United States
- 38.667406°N 86.777126°W

Information
- Type: Public high school
- Established: 1906
- School district: Shoals Community School Corporation
- Superintendent: Kindra Hovis
- Principal: Troy Zollars
- Faculty: 15.00 (FTE)
- Grades: 9-12
- Enrollment: 210 (2023-2024)
- Student to teacher ratio: 14.00
- Colors: Blue and white
- Athletics conference: Blue Chip Conference
- Nickname: Jug Rox
- Website: www.shoals.k12.in.us/high-school

Shoals High School is a high school in Shoals, Indiana, United States. Its athletic nickname is the "Jug Rox" and it participates in the Blue Chip Conference.

== See also ==
- List of high schools in Indiana
- Blue Chip Conference
- Shoals, Indiana
