= Center Township, Martin County, Indiana =

Center Township
- Township
- Location in Martin County
- Coordinates: 38°40′52″N 86°48′59″W
- Country: United States
- State: Indiana
- County: Martin

Government
  - Type: Indiana township

Area
  - Total: 40.21 sq mi (104.1 km^{2})
  - Land: 39.46 sq mi (102.2 km^{2})
  - Water: 0.75 sq mi (1.9 km^{2}) 1.87%
- Elevation: 505 ft (154 m)

Population (2020)
  - Total: 1,448
  - Density: 36.70/sq mi (14.17/km^{2})
- Time zone: UTC-5 (Eastern (EST))
  - Summer (DST): UTC-4 (EDT)
- ZIP codes: 47553, 47581
- Area codes: 812, 930
- GNIS feature ID: 453188

Center Township is one of six townships in Martin County, Indiana, United States. As of the 2020 census, its population was 1,448 and it contained 717 housing units.

Historical population
Census	Pop.	Note	%±
1890	1,519		—
1900	1,623		6.8%
1910	1,384		−14.7%
1920	1,397		0.9%
1930	1,458		4.4%
1940	1,640		12.5%
1950	1,419		−13.5%
1960	1,499		5.6%
1970	1,666		11.1%
1980	1,761		5.7%
1990	1,820		3.4%
2000	1,734		−4.7%
2010	1,654		−4.6%
2020	1,448		−12.5%
Source: US Decennial Census

== Geography ==
According to the 2010 census, the township has a total area of 40.21 square miles (104.1 km^{2}), of which 39.46 square miles (102.2 km^{2}) (or 98.13%) is land and 0.75 square miles (1.9 km^{2}) (or 1.87%) is water.

=== Cities, towns, villages ===
- Shoals (west half)

=== Unincorporated towns ===
- Dover Hill at 38.725050°N 86.802778°W
- Hindostan Falls at 38.624496°N 86.850833°W
- Pleasant Valley at 38.631996°N 86.801387°W
- Shoals Overlook at 38.679495°N 86.804444°W

(This list is based on USGS data and may include former settlements.)

=== Cemeteries ===
The township contains these three cemeteries: Hall, McBrides and Sholts.

=== Major highways ===
- U.S. Route 50
- U.S. Route 150
- State Road 550

== School districts ==
- Shoals Community School Corporation

== Political districts ==
- Indiana's 8th congressional district
- State House District 62
- State House District 63
- State Senate District 48
