= Cale, Indiana =

- Unincorporated community
- Martin County's location in Indiana

- Location in Martin County
- Coordinates: 38°47′45″N 86°45′05″W
- Country: United States
- State: Indiana
- County: Martin
- Township: Mitcheltree
- Elevation: 518 ft (158 m)
- Time zone: UTC-5 (Eastern (EST))
  - Summer (DST): UTC-4 (EDT)
- ZIP code: 47581
- Area codes: 812, 930
- GNIS feature ID: 449812

Cale is an unincorporated community in Mitcheltree Township, Martin County, in the U.S. state of Indiana.

== History ==
The community was originally named New Cale, and was located approximately one mile north of its present-day location. When John Walsh built a railroad through the area in the 1870s, some people moved from the original settlement to the new location to be closer to the railway. The two settlements became known as New Cale and Old Cale. By the mid-1880s the population had increased considerably and the new location became known simply as Cale by 1889.

A post office called Cale was established in 1884, and remained in operation until it was discontinued in 1908. The name Cale likely takes its name from a former school, Kale School, which in turn was named for a local resident.

== Notable person ==
- Victor Vic Aldridge, major league baseball player (1917–28), born here in 1893
