= Dover Hill, Indiana =

- Census-designated place
- Location in Martin County, Indiana
- Coordinates: 38°43′20″N 86°48′00″W
- Country: United States
- State: Indiana
- County: Martin
- Township: Center

Area
  - Total: 0.78 sq mi (2.01 km^{2})
  - Land: 0.78 sq mi (2.01 km^{2})
  - Water: 0 sq mi (0.00 km^{2})
- Elevation: 623 ft (190 m)

Population (2020)
  - Total: 96
  - Density: 123.7/sq mi (47.76/km^{2})
- Time zone: UTC-5 (Eastern (EST))
  - Summer (DST): UTC-4 (EDT)
- ZIP code: 47581 (Shoals)
- Area codes: 812, 930
- FIPS code: 18-18550
- GNIS feature ID: 2583449

Dover Hill is an unincorporated community and census-designated place (CDP) in Center Township, Martin County, in the U.S. state of Indiana. As of the 2020 census, it had a population of 96.

== History ==
A post office was established at Dover Hill in 1846 and remained in operation until 1906. The community was likely named after Dover in England.

== Geography ==
Dover Hill is located in central Martin County with Indiana Highway 450 running through the town. The highway leads south 4 miles (6 km) to Shoals, the county seat, and northeast 23 miles (37 km) to Bedford. The town sits atop a narrow ridge that drains north to Dover Run and Pass Creek, and south to Branch Run and Beech Creek. Both creeks are tributaries of the East Fork of the White River, which passes 1 mile (1.6 km) east of the town.

According to the U.S. Census Bureau, the Dover Hill CDP has a total area of 0.78 square miles (2.02 km^{2}), of which 0.001 square miles (0.00 km^{2}), or 0.13%, are water.

== Demographics ==
Historical population
Census	Pop.	Note	%±
2020	96		—
U.S. Decennial Census
