= Mount Olive, Indiana =

- Unincorporated community
- Martin County's location in Indiana

- Location in Martin County
- Coordinates: 38°47′55″N 86°41′39″W
- Country: United States
- State: Indiana
- County: Martin
- Township: Mitcheltree
- Elevation: 525 ft (160 m)
- Time zone: UTC-5 (Eastern (EST))
  - Summer (DST): UTC-4 (EDT)
- ZIP code: 47581
- Area codes: 812, 930
- GNIS feature ID: 451249

Mount Olive is an unincorporated community in Mitcheltree Township, Martin County, in the U.S. state of Indiana.

== History ==
A post office was established at Mount Olive in 1887, and remained in operation until it was discontinued in 1916. The community was likely named, directly or indirectly, after the Mount of Olives.
