= Jug Rock =

Rock formation in Indiana, United States

Coordinates: 38°41′N 86°48′W

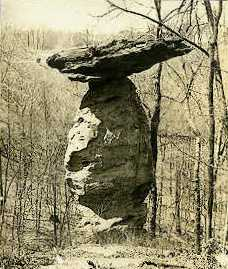
Jug Rock

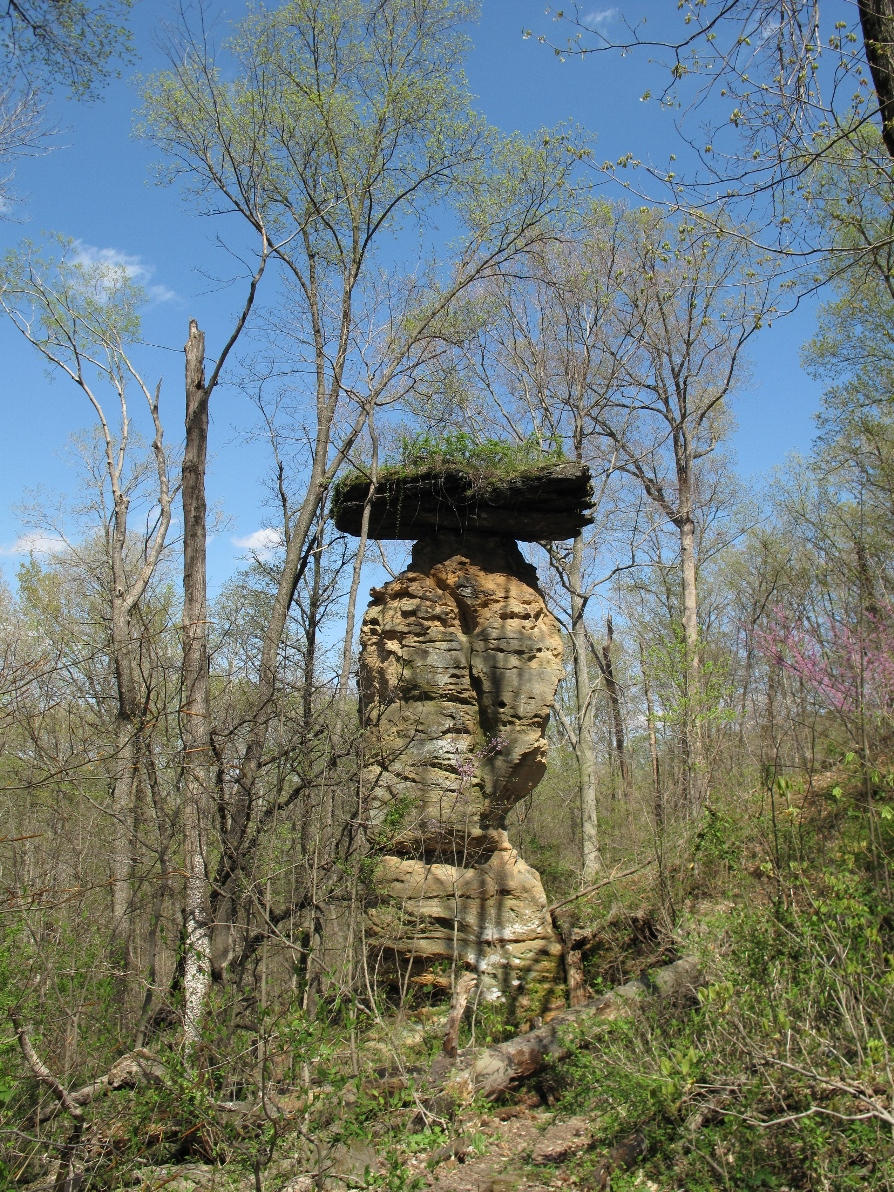
Jug Rock photo taken in 2010

Jug Rock is a natural geological formation located outside of Shoals, Indiana, in the valley of the East Fork of the White River. It is composed of sandstone, and is the largest free-standing table rock formation (also called a "mushroom rock") in the United States east of the Mississippi River. It is part of the Mansfield formation, laid down in the Pennsylvanian geological epoch, roughly 325 to 286 million years ago. Erosion along fracture lines separated it from a nearby cliff. A companion feature, House Rock, stands opposite Jug Rock.

== References Geological Publication ==
In the Second Report of the Geological Survey of Indiana, published in 1871, State Geologist E. T. Cox wrote: One of the most interesting spots to visit, for obtaining a view of this character of scenery, is near the town of Shoals, on the road to the Indian Sulphur Springs. A high ridge of millstone grit, here, terminates within a few yards of the East Fork of the White River, from the top of which, there is a projecting mass of conglomerate sandstone, called the "Pinnacle," which stands one hundred and seventy feet above the level of the stream. Cyclopean blocks, that have broken off, lie around the foot of the ridge, in every conceivable position. On the north side of this ridge, the conglomerate has been cut through by disintegrating forces, which left, at some distance from the main ledge, a tall mass of rock, which has received the name of "Jug Rock," from the fancied resemblance which it bears to a jug. It is forty-two feet high and supports, on its top, a flat projecting layer, which is called the "stopper." Just above the bulge of the jug are irregular lines of stratification, known as false bedding. The lower part is thickly set with quartz pebbles. The frontispiece to this volume presents a view of the "Jug Rock" which was copied from a photograph taken by D. Allbright. For this faithful representative of a highly interesting geological scene, I am indebted to B. F. Devol, and D. Allbright, of Shoals.

Jug Rock is currently part of a nature preserve owned by the Indiana Department of Natural Resources.

This unusual rock feature gives its name to the team of nearby Shoals High School, "Shoals Jug Rox." The Jug Rock- named "Roxer Boxer," is the school's mascot.
