= Natchez, Indiana =

- Unincorporated community
- Martin County's location in Indiana

- Location in Martin County
- Coordinates: 38°37′02″N 86°42′39″W
- Country: United States
- State: Indiana
- County: Martin
- Township: Halbert
- Elevation: 509 ft (155 m)
- Time zone: UTC-5 (Eastern (EST))
  - Summer (DST): UTC-4 (EDT)
- ZIP code: 47581
- Area codes: 812, 930
- FIPS code: 18-52060
- GNIS feature ID: 439945

Natchez is an unincorporated community in Halbert Township, Martin County, in the U.S. state of Indiana.

== History ==
A post office was established at Natchez in 1844, and remained in operation until it was discontinued in 1905. The community was likely named after Natchez, Mississippi.

== Geography ==
Natchez is located along U.S. Route 150 in the Hoosier National Forest.
