= Mitcheltree Township, Martin County, Indiana =

Mitcheltree Township
- Township
- Location in Martin County
- Coordinates: 38°50′00″N 86°47′30″W
- Country: United States
- State: Indiana
- County: Martin

Government
  - Type: Indiana township

Area
  - Total: 71.39 sq mi (184.9 km^{2})
  - Land: 70.76 sq mi (183.3 km^{2})
  - Water: 0.63 sq mi (1.6 km^{2}) 0.88%
- Elevation: 620 ft (189 m)

Population (2020)
  - Total: 571
  - Density: 8.07/sq mi (3.12/km^{2})
- Time zone: UTC-5 (Eastern (EST))
  - Summer (DST): UTC-4 (EDT)
- ZIP codes: 47446, 47470, 47581
- Area codes: 812, 930
- GNIS feature ID: 452421

Mitcheltree Township is one of six townships in Martin County, Indiana, United States. As of the 2020 census, its population was 571 and it contained 313 housing units.

Historical population
Census	Pop.	Note	%±
1890	1,267		—
1900	1,496		18.1%
1910	1,297		−13.3%
1920	1,132		−12.7%
1930	948		−16.3%
1940	1,379		45.5%
1950	843		−38.9%
1960	788		−6.5%
1970	714		−9.4%
1980	792		10.9%
1990	706		−10.9%
2000	692		−2.0%
2010	624		−9.8%
2020	571		−8.5%
Source: US Decennial Census

== Geography ==
According to the 2010 census, the township has a total area of 71.39 square miles (184.9 km^{2}), of which 70.76 square miles (183.3 km^{2}) (or 99.12%) is land and 0.63 square miles (1.6 km^{2}) (or 0.88%) is water.

=== Unincorporated towns ===
- Cale at 38.795883°N 86.751388°W
- Indian Springs at 38.796438°N 86.765°W
- Mount Olive at 38.798661°N 86.694165°W
- Trinity Springs at 38.7572722°N 86.7644438°W

(This list is based on USGS data and may include former settlements.)

=== Cemeteries ===
The township contains these fifteen cemeteries: Bridges, Bridges, Brock, Chandler, Clarke, Dogtrot, Jackson, Little Hickory Ridge, Mountain Spring, Pleasant Grove, Rector, Roberts, Uno-Paton, Wagner and Wards.

== School districts ==
- Shoals Community School Corporation

== Political districts ==
- Indiana's 8th congressional district
- State House District 62
- State Senate District 48
