= Bramble, Indiana =

- Unincorporated community
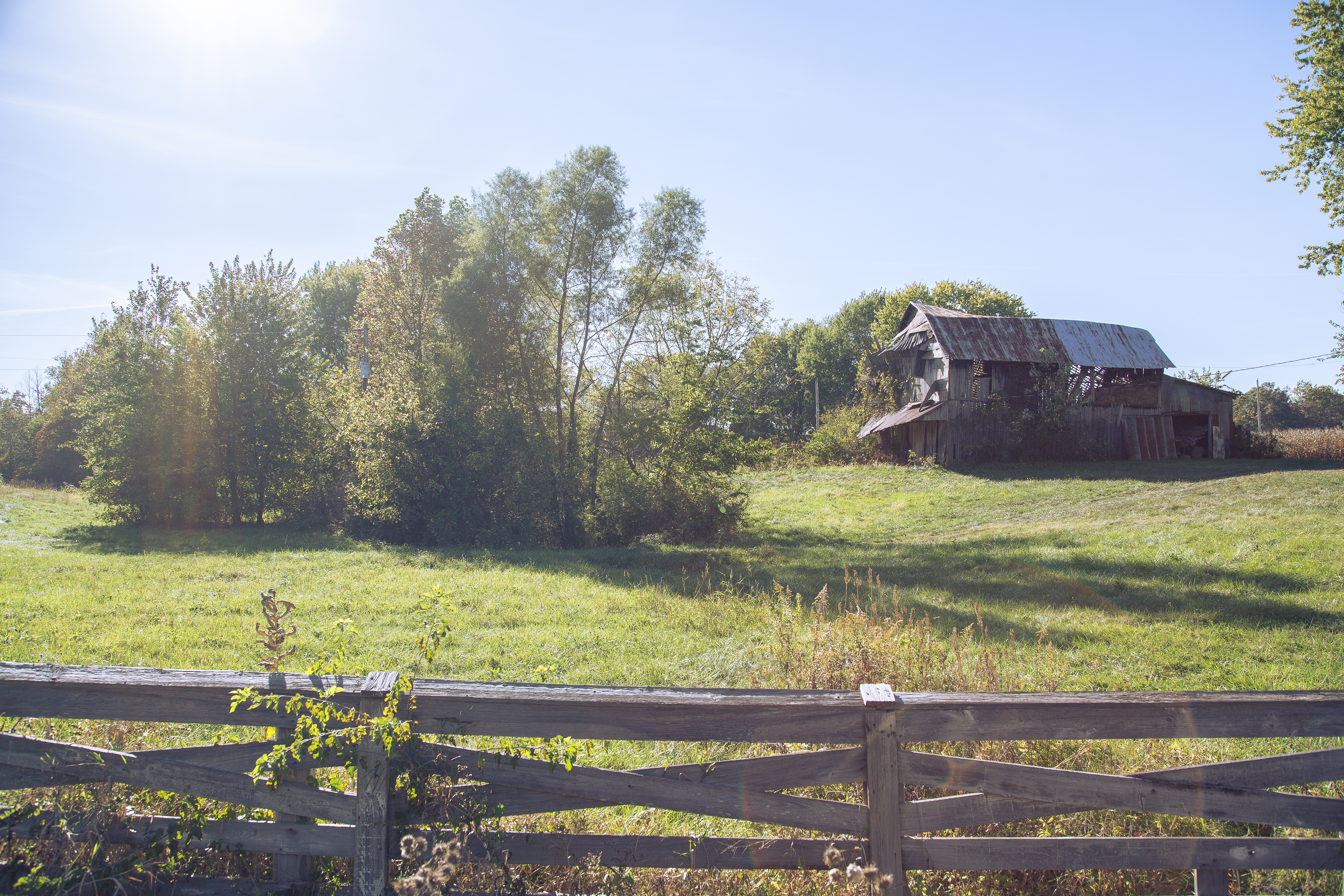

- Martin County's location in Indiana

- Location in Martin County
- Coordinates: 38°46′44″N 86°54′34″W
- Country: United States
- State: Indiana
- County: Martin
- Township: Perry
- Elevation: 587 ft (179 m)
- Time zone: UTC-5 (Eastern (EST))
  - Summer (DST): UTC-4 (EDT)
- ZIP code: 47553
- Area codes: 812, 930
- FIPS code: 18-07048
- GNIS feature ID: 446879

Bramble is an unincorporated community in Perry Township, Martin County, in the U.S. state of Indiana.

== History ==
A post office was established at Bramble in 1879, and remained in operation until it was discontinued in 1906. The community was named for the original owner of the town site.
