= Pleasant Valley, Martin County, Indiana =

Pleasant Valley, Indiana
- Unincorporated community
- Martin County's location in Indiana

- Location in Martin County
- Coordinates: 38°37′55″N 86°48′05″W
- Country: United States
- State: Indiana
- County: Martin
- Township: Center
- Elevation: 486 ft (148 m)
- Time zone: UTC-5 (Eastern (EST))
  - Summer (DST): UTC-4 (EDT)
- ZIP code: 47581
- Area codes: 812, 930
- FIPS code: 18-60635
- GNIS feature ID: 451347

Pleasant Valley is an unincorporated community in Center Township, Martin County, in the U.S. state of Indiana.

== History ==
A post office was established at Pleasant Valley in 1850, and remained in operation until 1859. The community was named from its scenic setting.

== Geography ==
Pleasant Valley is located along State Road 550 in the Hoosier National Forest.
