= Hindostan Falls, Indiana =

- Unincorporated community
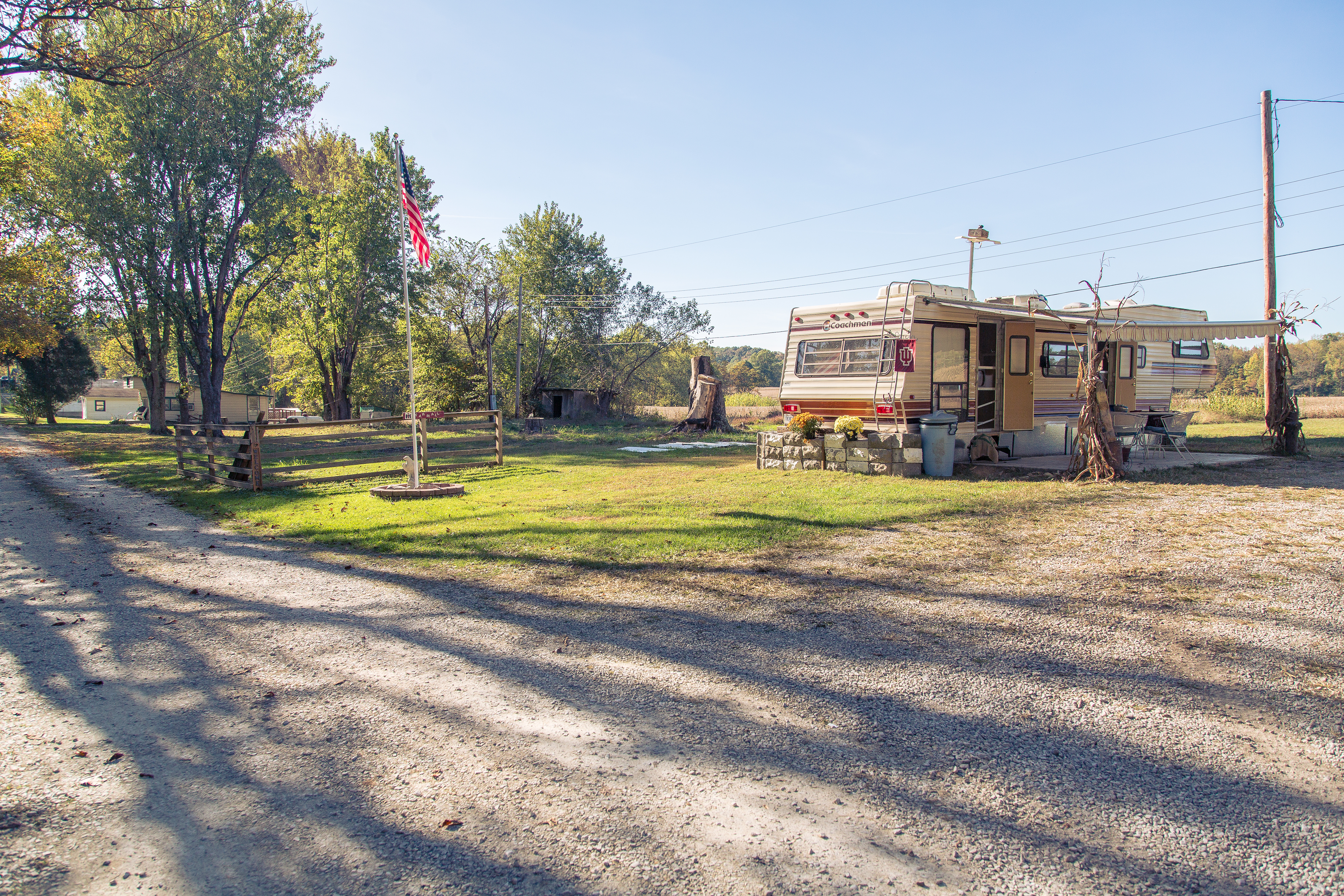

- Martin County's location in Indiana

- Location in Martin County
- Coordinates: 38°37′28″N 86°51′03″W
- Country: United States
- State: Indiana
- County: Martin
- Township: Center
- Elevation: 459 ft (140 m)

Population (2000)
  - Total: 1
- Time zone: UTC-5 (Eastern (EST))
  - Summer (DST): UTC-4 (EDT)
- ZIP code: 47581
- Area codes: 812, 930
- FIPS code: 18-34024
- GNIS feature ID: 451046

Hindostan Falls is a former unincorporated community in Center Township, Martin County, in the U.S. state of Indiana.

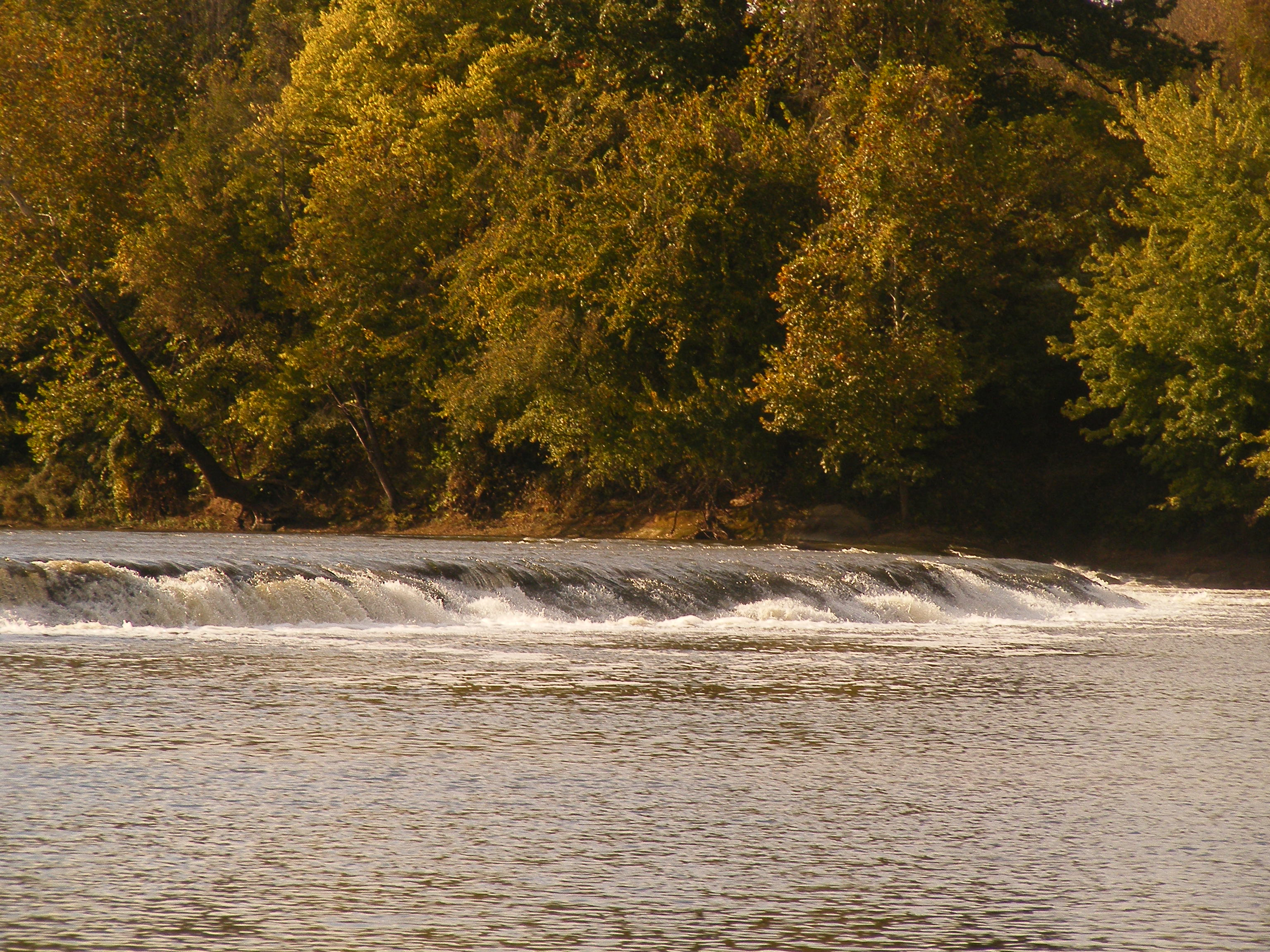
Hindostan Falls, on the east fork of the White River.

== Founding and early history ==
Hindostan was founded at the falls of the East Fork of the White River in 1816. The settlement sat along the original stagecoach route between New Albany and Vincennes and was one of the only roads in the new state of Indiana, which had been a territory until 1816. By 1820, it was the largest community in what was then still Daviess County and the most promising town on the White River. The town was named "Hindostan" by a soldier, Captain Caleb Fellows, an English immigrant who had served with the British East India Company in India before he came to the United States and invested in land along the still raw Indiana frontier.

By 1820, about 1,200 people lived in the new town, making it one of the largest settlements in frontier Indiana. Many lived on houseboats on the White River. The surge of population toward new land on the Indiana and Illinois frontiers, as well as Hindostan's location along the stagecoach route, meant that it was constantly open to carriers of disease. Disease eventually destroyed the town.

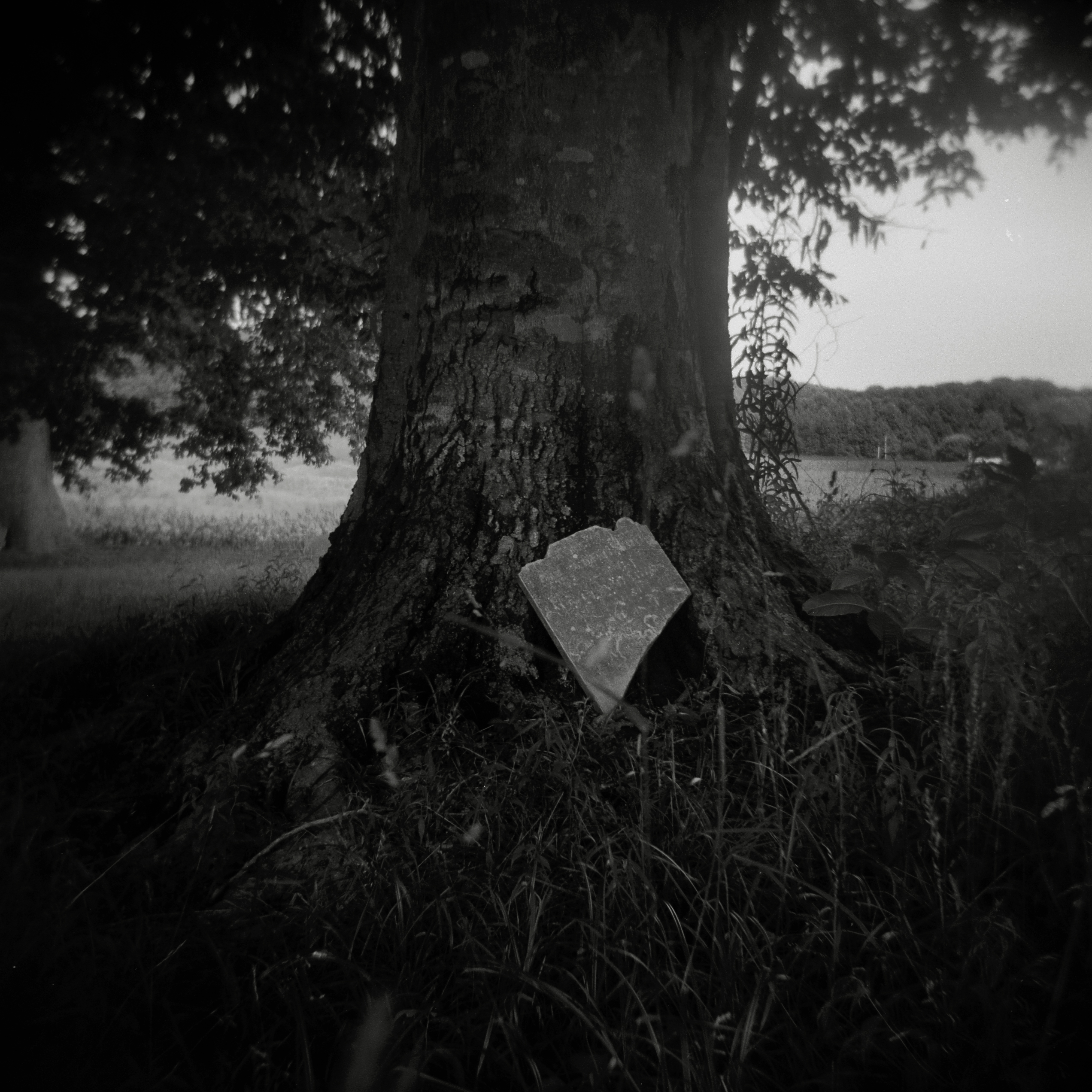
Pioneer cemetery, Hindostan Falls, Indiana

== Sickness and disappearance of the town ==
An epidemic of yellow fever or cholera broke out in Hindostan in 1820. Water- and insect-borne illnesses were the bane of many towns on the Midwestern frontier. Situated along rivers for the purpose of easy transportation, towns were often built on flood plains that bred insects in huge numbers. The ferocity of the epidemic that struck Hindostan, however, caused the population to succumb to disease or abandon the area. By 1824, less than half the population remained in Hindostan, though many seem to have stayed in the county.

An economic depression around 1820 worked alongside the epidemic to drive people away. Some families who had bought land on credit defaulted and fled the area. Hindostan may have lost as many residents to the economic depression as to sickness. Residents who remained were unable to pay their taxes and county and local creditors foreclosed on their property.

According to rumor, a county tax collector had several thousand dollars of revenue in his possession when he fell ill during the epidemic. He was thought to have buried the money (gold and silver coins) in an iron pot for safe-keeping until the illness passed. When he died, the money's location was lost forever.

Faced with the gradual desertion of the town, the post office, which was established in 1819, was discontinued on December 29, 1830. The site of the prosperous town eventually became farmland.

In 1828, the county seat was relocated to Mt. Pleasant, several miles away. This town site was then abandoned by most of its residents in 1853 for a nearby site, now called Loogootee, four miles from Hindostan. The county seat, however, was moved to Trinity Springs, a health spa, then to Shoals in 1871. Shoals today has a population of only 690, which puts it at about half the size of Hindostan before it vanished.

== Remains ==
The site is now the location of an Indiana state fishing and recreation area. A historic marker on State Highway 550 stands a half-mile north of where the town was. No buildings survive, but there are a few surviving pioneer cemeteries nearby, a restored church, and numerous square holes in a large flat rock along the river drilled to support a mill at Hindostan. (The mill was owned by Frederick Shulz, after whom the town of Shoals was named.)

== Geography ==
Hindostan Falls is located at 38°37′28″N 86°51′03″W.

== Gallery ==
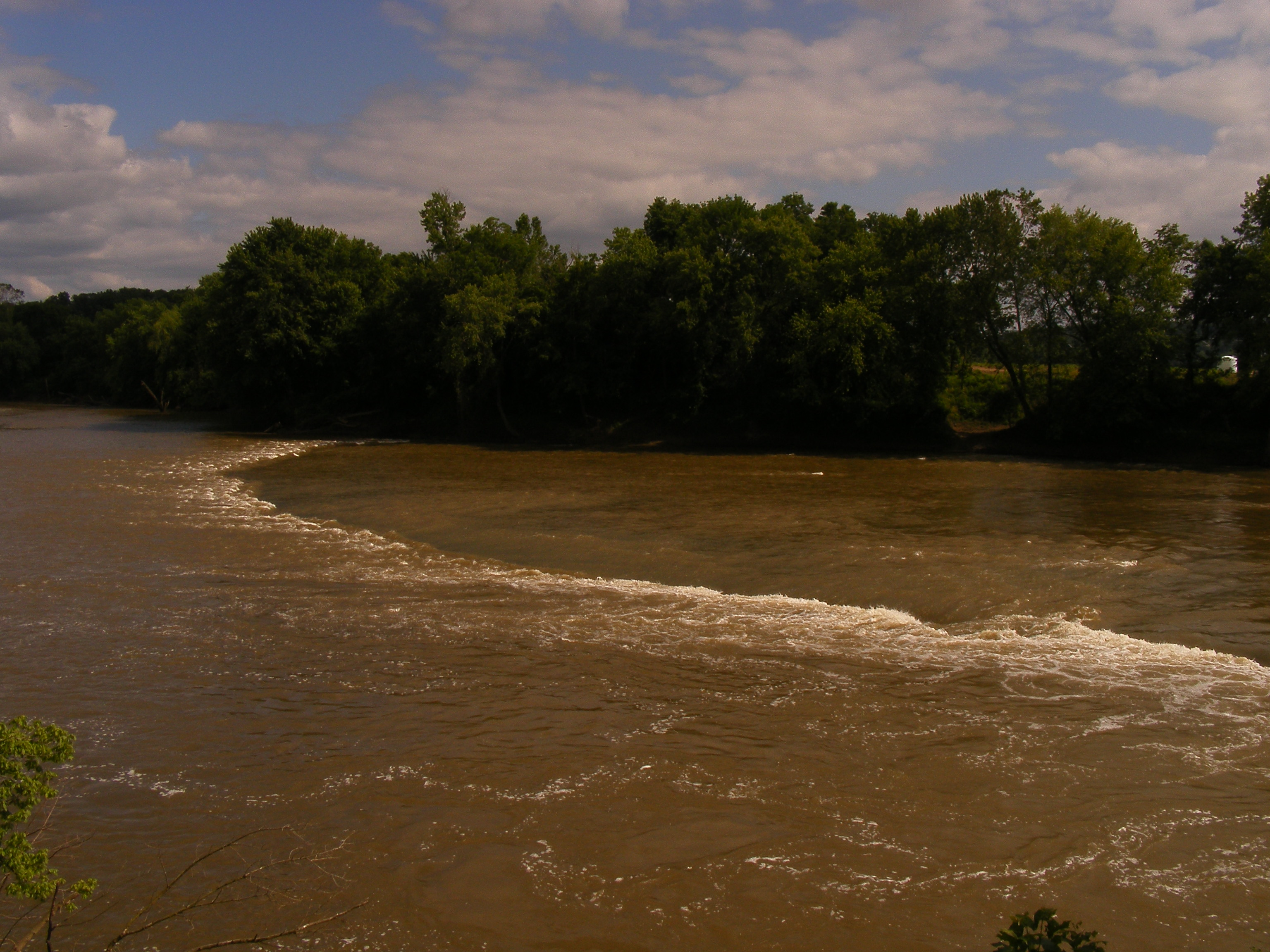
Hindostan Falls during high water on the East Fork White River

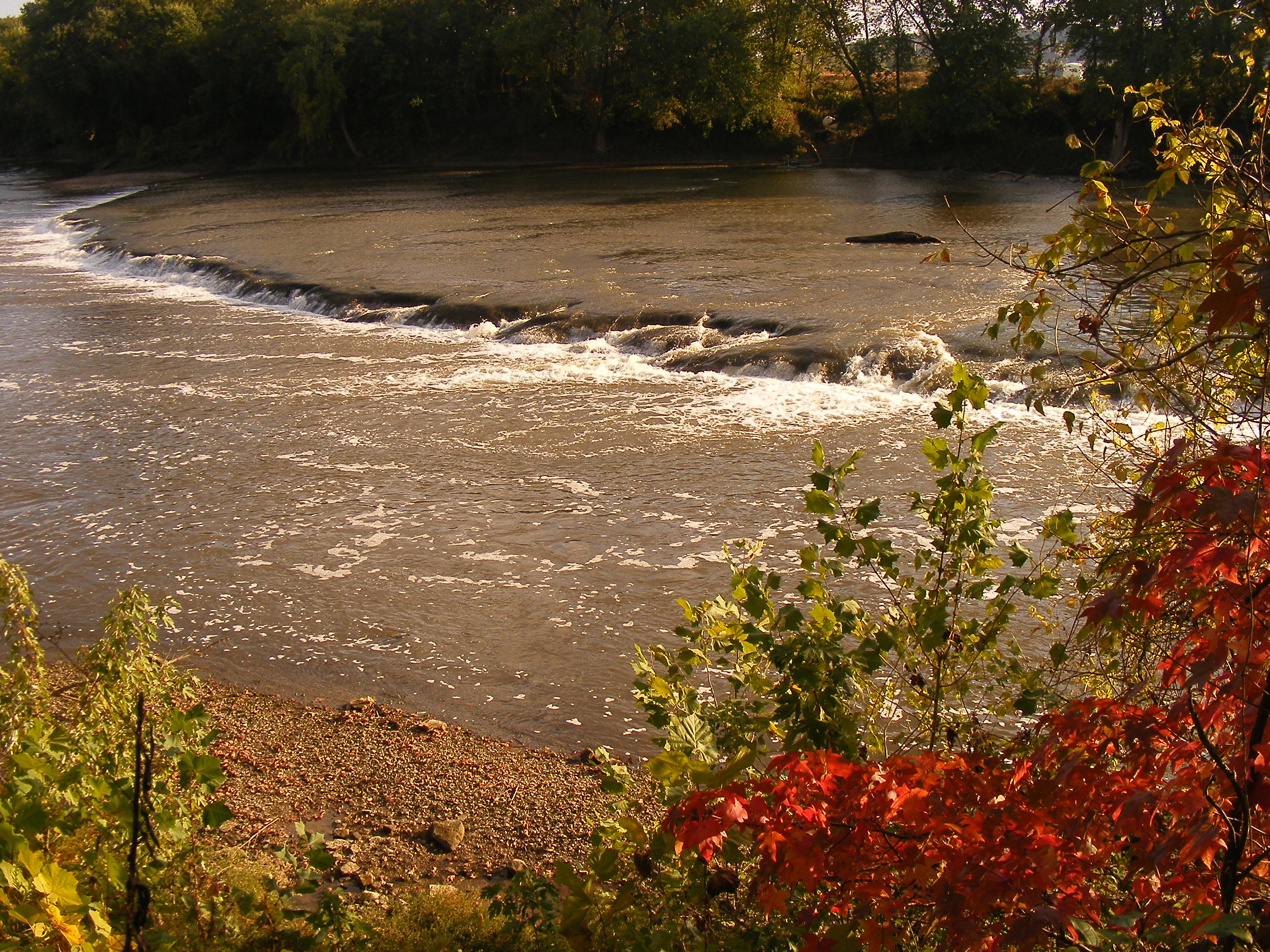
Hindostan Falls at low (three feet) water

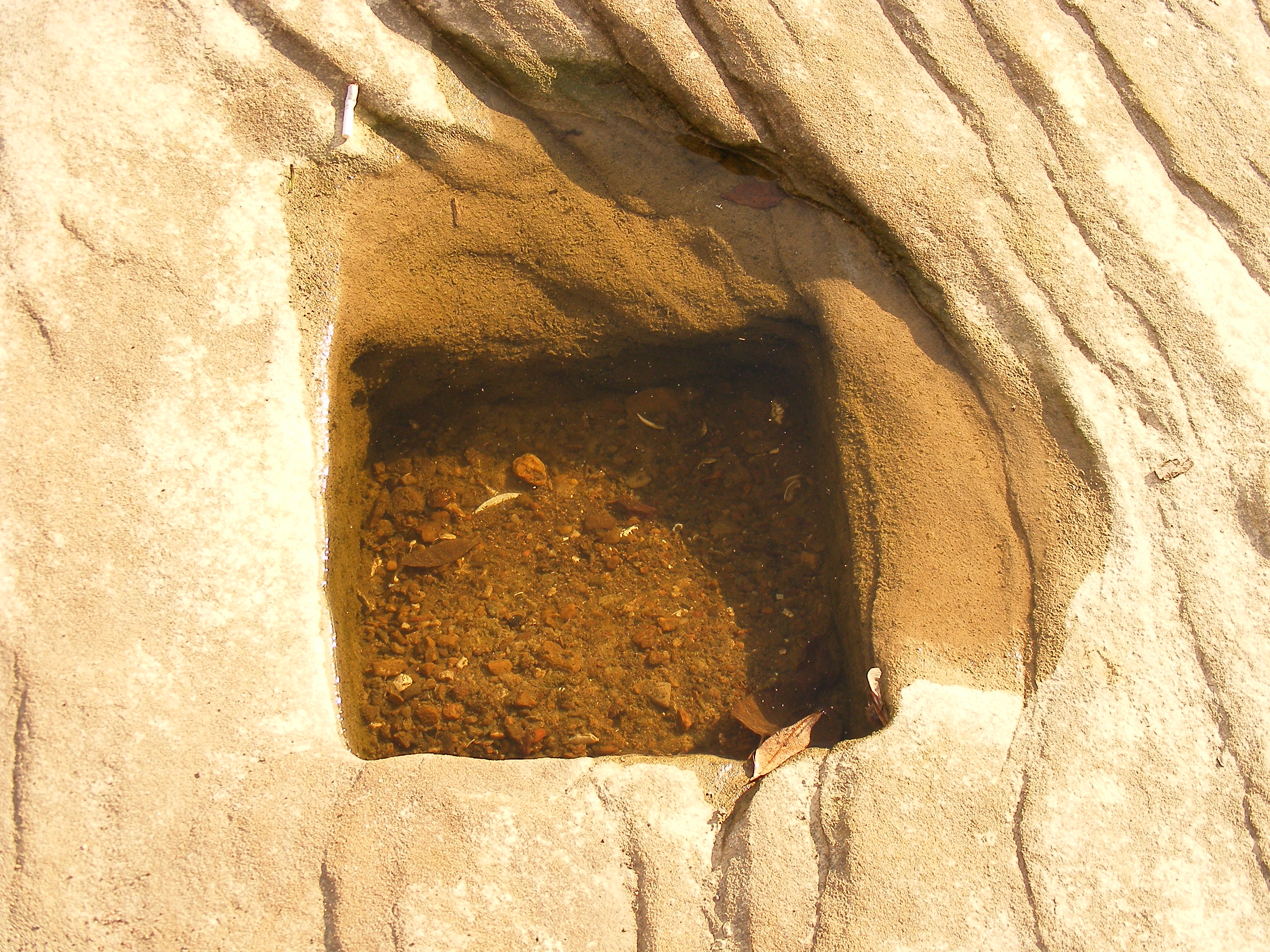
One of the holes that supported a mill below Hindostan Falls
