= Ironton, Indiana =

- Unincorporated community
- Martin County's location in Indiana

- Location in Martin County
- Coordinates: 38°39′44″N 86°46′31″W
- Country: United States
- State: Indiana
- County: Martin
- Township: Halbert
- Elevation: 482 ft (147 m)
- Time zone: UTC-5 (Eastern (EST))
  - Summer (DST): UTC-4 (EDT)
- ZIP code: 47581
- Area codes: 812, 930
- FIPS code: 18-36504
- GNIS feature ID: 451089

Ironton is an unincorporated community in Halbert Township, Martin County, in the U.S. state of Indiana.

== History ==
Ironton was founded in 1873, and named for the presence of ironworks.
