= Whitfield, Indiana =

- Unincorporated community
- Martin County's location in Indiana

- Location in Martin County
- Coordinates: 38°37′07″N 86°54′46″W
- Country: United States
- State: Indiana
- County: Martin
- Township: Perry
- Elevation: 571 ft (174 m)
- Time zone: UTC-5 (Eastern (EST))
  - Summer (DST): UTC-4 (EDT)
- ZIP code: 47553
- Area codes: 812, 930
- FIPS code: 18-84104
- GNIS feature ID: 445985

Whitfield is an unincorporated community in Perry Township, Martin County, in the U.S. state of Indiana.

== History ==
Whitfield was originally known as Stremler, and under the latter name was founded in 1892. A post office was established at Whitfield in 1892, and remained in operation until it was discontinued in 1906.
