= Mount Pleasant, Martin County, Indiana =

Mount Pleasant
- Unincorporated community
- Martin County's location in Indiana

- Location in Martin County
- Coordinates: 38°39′07″N 86°53′32″W
- Country: United States
- State: Indiana
- County: Martin
- Township: Perry
- Elevation: 594 ft (181 m)
- Time zone: UTC-5 (Eastern (EST))
  - Summer (DST): UTC-4 (EDT)
- ZIP code: 47553
- Area codes: 812, 930
- GNIS feature ID: 439638

Mount Pleasant is an unincorporated community in Perry Township, Martin County, in the U.S. state of Indiana.

== History ==
A post office was established at Mount Pleasant in 1824, and remained in operation until it was discontinued in 1862. The name is likely descriptive.
