= Rusk, Indiana =

- Unincorporated community
- Martin County's location in Indiana

- Location in Martin County
- Coordinates: 38°33′26″N 86°45′25″W
- Country: United States
- State: Indiana
- County: Martin
- Township: Lost River
- Elevation: 656 ft (200 m)
- Time zone: UTC-5 (Eastern (EST))
  - Summer (DST): UTC-4 (EDT)
- ZIP code: 47581
- Area codes: 812, 930
- GNIS feature ID: 451410

Rusk is an unincorporated community in Lost River Township, Martin County, in the U.S. state of Indiana.

== History ==
Rusk was first settled in 1836, and was likely named after Jeremiah M. Rusk, a former U.S. Secretary of Agriculture. A post office was established at Rusk in 1892, and remained in operation until it was discontinued in 1954.

The community was struck by an EF2 tornado on June 25, 2023. One person was killed, and another was injured when a two-story cabin was destroyed.
