= Padanaram Settlement =

Community in Indiana, US

Coordinates: 38.71°N 86.8°W

Padanaram Settlement is an intentional community and unincorporated community in the U.S. state of Indiana.

Padanaram is located on nearly 3,000 acres (1,200 ha) in the wooded countryside of Martin County in southern Indiana. Founded in 1966 by Daniel Wright, his wife Lois and a few friends, it has grown from 86 acres to its present size of 3000 acres. The community is located on 3000 acres of woods, farmland, and lakes. As of 2008, the population consists of around 70 adults and 70 children who live in communal buildings with apartments or in individual homes. They also practice midwifery and home births.
