= Lost River Township, Martin County, Indiana =

Lost River Township
- Township
- Location in Martin County
- Coordinates: 38°33′14″N 86°45′51″W
- Country: United States
- State: Indiana
- County: Martin

Government
  - Type: Indiana township

Area
  - Total: 42.75 sq mi (110.7 km^{2})
  - Land: 42.29 sq mi (109.5 km^{2})
  - Water: 0.46 sq mi (1.2 km^{2}) 1.08%
- Elevation: 564 ft (172 m)

Population (2020)
  - Total: 513
  - Density: 12.1/sq mi (4.68/km^{2})
- Time zone: UTC-5 (Eastern (EST))
  - Summer (DST): UTC-4 (EDT)
- ZIP codes: 47432, 47527, 47581
- Area codes: 812, 930
- GNIS feature ID: 453582

Lost River Township is one of six townships in Martin County, Indiana, United States. As of the 2020 census, its population was 513 and it contained 250 housing units.

Historical population
Census	Pop.	Note	%±
1890	1,448		—
1900	1,415		−2.3%
1910	1,283		−9.3%
1920	1,155		−10.0%
1930	858		−25.7%
1940	879		2.4%
1950	707		−19.6%
1960	610		−13.7%
1970	509		−16.6%
1980	524		2.9%
1990	449		−14.3%
2000	532		18.5%
2010	572		7.5%
2020	513		−10.3%
Source: US Decennial Census

== Geography ==
According to the 2010 census, the township has a total area of 42.75 square miles (110.7 km^{2}), of which 42.29 square miles (109.5 km^{2}) (or 98.92%) is land and 0.46 square miles (1.2 km^{2}) (or 1.08%) is water.

=== Unincorporated towns ===
- Rusk at 38.557276°N 86.75694°W
- Windom at 38.573942°N 86.797775°W

(This list is based on USGS data and may include former settlements.)

=== Cemeteries ===
The township contains these seven cemeteries: Anderson, Cornel, Emmons Ridge, Green, Jones, Simmons and Walker.

=== Major highways ===
- U.S. Route 150

== School districts ==
- Shoals Community School Corporation

== Political districts ==
- Indiana's 8th congressional district
- State House District 62
- State Senate District 48
