= Perry Township, Martin County, Indiana =

Perry Township
- Township
- Location in Martin County
- Coordinates: 38°50′00″N 86°50′00″W
- Country: United States
- State: Indiana
- County: Martin

Government
  - Type: Indiana township

Area
  - Total: 98.3 sq mi (255 km^{2})
  - Land: 96.49 sq mi (249.9 km^{2})
  - Water: 1.81 sq mi (4.7 km^{2}) 1.84%
- Elevation: 505 ft (154 m)

Population (2020)
  - Total: 5,060
  - Density: 52.4/sq mi (20.2/km^{2})
- Time zone: UTC-5 (Eastern (EST))
  - Summer (DST): UTC-4 (EDT)
- ZIP codes: 47522, 47553, 47562
- Area codes: 812, 930
- GNIS feature ID: 452422

Perry Township is one of six townships in Martin County, Indiana, United States. As of the 2020 census, its population was 5,060 and it contained 2,269 housing units.

Historical population
| Census | Pop. | Note | %± |
|---|---|---|---|
| 1890 | 2,060 | | — |
| 1900 | 2,503 | | 21.5% |
| 1910 | 3,036 | | 21.3% |
| 1920 | 3,077 | | 1.4% |
| 1930 | 2,880 | | −6.4% |
| 1940 | 3,243 | | 12.6% |
| 1950 | 5,235 | | 61.4% |
| 1960 | 5,347 | | 2.1% |
| 1970 | 5,775 | | 8.0% |
| 1980 | 5,624 | | −2.6% |
| 1990 | 5,126 | | −8.9% |
| 2000 | 4,960 | | −3.2% |
| 2010 | 5,093 | | 2.7% |
| 2020 | 5,060 | | −0.6% |
Source: US Decennial Census

== Geography ==
According to the 2010 census, the township has a total area of 98.3 square miles (255 km^{2}), of which 96.49 square miles (249.9 km^{2}) (or 98.16%) is land and 1.81 square miles (4.7 km^{2}) (or 1.84%) is water.

=== Cities, towns, villages ===
- Crane
- Loogootee

=== Unincorporated towns ===
- Bramble at 38.7789379°N 86.9094486°W
- Burns City at 38.8225486°N 86.8869483°W
- Mount Pleasant at 38.651995°N 86.8922239°W
- Scenic Hill at 38.6783836°N 86.8938911°W
- Whitfield at 38.6186619°N 86.9127796°W

(This list is based on USGS data and may include former settlements.)

=== Cemeteries ===
The township contains these seventeen cemeteries: Blankenship, Boggs Creek, Brook, Carr, Goodwill, Henry, Holt, Houghton, Ledgerwood, Love, Saint Johns, Saint Joseph, Salem, Waggoner, West Union, Williams and Woods.

=== Major highways ===
- U.S. Route 50
- U.S. Route 231
- State Road 550

=== Lakes ===
- West Boggs Lake

=== Landmarks ===
- West Boggs Park

== School districts ==
- Loogootee Community School Corporation

== Political districts ==
- Indiana's 8th congressional district
- State House District 63
- State Senate District 48
