= Trinity Springs, Indiana =

- Unincorporated community
- Martin County's location in Indiana

- Location in Martin County
- Coordinates: 38°45′26.2″N 86°45′52″W
- Country: United States
- State: Indiana
- County: Martin
- Township: Mitcheltree
- Elevation: 600 ft (180 m)
- Time zone: UTC-5 (Eastern (EST))
  - Summer (DST): UTC-4 (EDT)
- ZIP code: 47581
- Area codes: 812, 930
- GNIS feature ID: 444910

Trinity Springs is an unincorporated community in Mitcheltree Township, Martin County, in the U.S. state of Indiana.

== History ==
Trinity Springs was originally known as Harrisonville, and under the latter name was platted in 1837. It is the site of three natural springs and was a popular tourist destination in the early 1900s; at one point, seven different hotels operated in the community. The town was briefly the county seat in the 1800s.

A post office was established at Trinity Springs in 1848, and remained in operation until it was discontinued in 1943.

A rock outcrop covered in historic graffiti and the remains of a historic swimming pool situated next to a natural sulfur spring are most of what is left of the resort, commemorated by a historic sign at Mustering Elm Park along State Road 450.

== Geography ==
Trinity Springs is 8 miles (13 km) north of Shoals.
