= Indian Springs, Indiana =

- Unincorporated community
- Martin County's location in Indiana

- Location in Martin County
- Coordinates: 38°47′47″N 86°45′54″W
- Country: United States
- State: Indiana
- County: Martin
- Township: Mitcheltree
- Elevation: 505 ft (154 m)
- Time zone: UTC-5 (Eastern (EST))
  - Summer (DST): UTC-4 (EDT)
- ZIP code: 47581
- Area codes: 812, 930
- FIPS code: 18-36234
- GNIS feature ID: 436782

Indian Springs is an unincorporated community in Mitcheltree Township, Martin County, in the U.S. state of Indiana.

== History ==
Indian Springs was laid out in 1889. A post office was established at Indian Springs in 1885, and remained in operation until it was discontinued in 1990.
