= Rutherford Township, Martin County, Indiana =

Rutherford Township
- Township
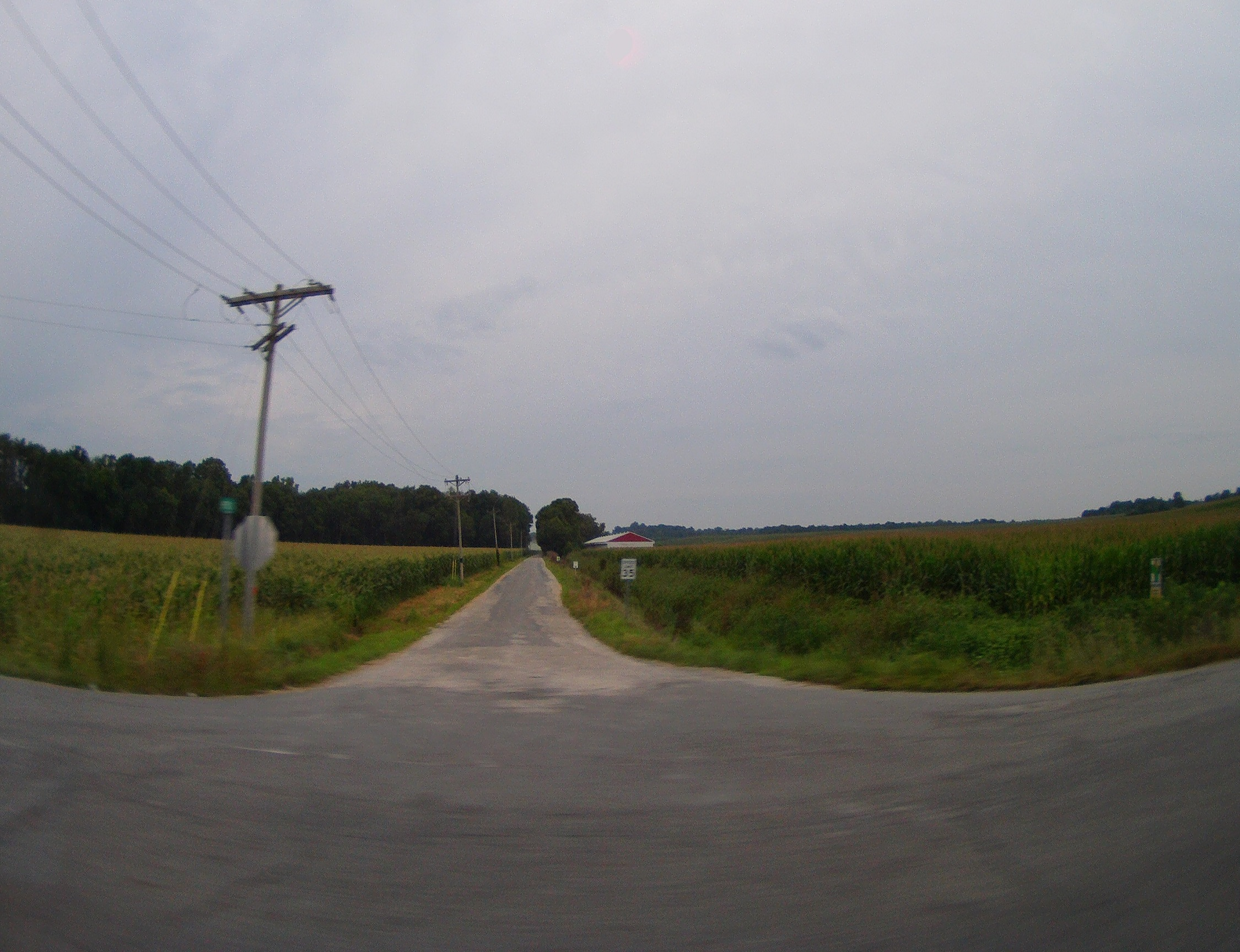
- Looking west on County Road 950 South from U.S. 231, in Rutherford Township

- Location in Martin County
- Coordinates: 38°33′34″N 86°52′57″W
- Country: United States
- State: Indiana
- County: Martin

Government
  - Type: Indiana township

Area
  - Total: 35.39 sq mi (91.7 km^{2})
  - Land: 34.81 sq mi (90.2 km^{2})
  - Water: 0.58 sq mi (1.5 km^{2}) 1.64%
- Elevation: 472 ft (144 m)

Population (2020)
  - Total: 675
  - Density: 19.4/sq mi (7.49/km^{2})
- Time zone: UTC-5 (Eastern (EST))
  - Summer (DST): UTC-4 (EDT)
- ZIP codes: 47527, 47553
- Area codes: 812, 930
- GNIS feature ID: 453818

Rutherford Township is one of six townships in Martin County, Indiana, United States. As of the 2020 census, its population was 675 and it contained 316 housing units.

Historical population
Census	Pop.	Note	%±
1890	1,218		—
1900	1,109		−8.9%
1910	899		−18.9%
1920	785		−12.7%
1930	668		−14.9%
1940	783		17.2%
1950	748		−4.5%
1960	689		−7.9%
1970	632		−8.3%
1980	654		3.5%
1990	681		4.1%
2000	730		7.2%
2010	760		4.1%
2020	675		−11.2%
Source: US Decennial Census

== Geography ==
According to the 2010 census, the township has a total area of 35.39 square miles (91.7 km^{2}), of which 34.81 square miles (90.2 km^{2}) (or 98.36%) is land and 0.58 square miles (1.5 km^{2}) (or 1.64%) is water.

=== Cemeteries ===
The township contains Holtsclaw, Truelove, White River, Inman, South Martin, and Mount Zion Cemeteries.

=== Major highways ===
- U.S. Route 231

== School districts ==
- Loogootee Community School Corporation

== Political districts ==
- Indiana's 8th congressional district
- State House District 63
- State Senate District 48
