= Halbert Township, Martin County, Indiana =

Halbert Township
- Township
- Location in Martin County
- Coordinates: 38°39′40″N 86°44′17″W
- Country: United States
- State: Indiana
- County: Martin

Government
  - Type: Indiana township

Area
  - Total: 52.37 sq mi (135.6 km^{2})
  - Land: 51.92 sq mi (134.5 km^{2})
  - Water: 0.44 sq mi (1.1 km^{2}) 0.84%
- Elevation: 574 ft (175 m)

Population (2020)
  - Total: 1,545
  - Density: 29.76/sq mi (11.49/km^{2})
- Time zone: UTC-5 (Eastern (EST))
  - Summer (DST): UTC-4 (EDT)
- ZIP codes: 47446, 47581
- Area codes: 812, 930
- GNIS feature ID: 453361

Halbert Township is one of six townships in Martin County, Indiana, United States. As of the 2020 census, its population was 1,545 and it contained 711 housing units.

Historical population
Census	Pop.	Note	%±
1890	1,881		—
1900	2,098		11.5%
1910	2,101		0.1%
1920	1,716		−18.3%
1930	1,558		−9.2%
1940	1,605		3.0%
1950	1,726		7.5%
1960	1,675		−3.0%
1970	1,673		−0.1%
1980	1,646		−1.6%
1990	1,587		−3.6%
2000	1,721		8.4%
2010	1,631		−5.2%
2020	1,545		−5.3%
Source: US Decennial Census

== Geography ==
According to the 2010 census, the township has a total area of 52.37 square miles (135.6 km^{2}), of which 51.92 square miles (134.5 km^{2}) (or 99.14%) is land and 0.44 square miles (1.1 km^{2}) (or 0.84%) is water.

=== Cities, towns, villages ===
- Shoals (east half)

=== Unincorporated towns ===
- Ironton at 38.662274°N 86.775276°W
- Lacy at 38.633663°N 86.776386°W
- Natchez at 38.617275°N 86.710828°W

=== Cemeteries ===
The township contains these five cemeteries: Acre, Baxter, Elliott, Hawkins and Union Chapel.

=== Major highways ===
- U.S. Route 50
- U.S. Route 150
- State Road 550

=== Lakes ===
- Deep Cut Lake

== School districts ==
- Shoals Community School Corporation

== Political districts ==
- Indiana's 8th congressional district
- State House District 62
- State House District 63
- State Senate District 48
