= Martin County, Indiana =

County in Indiana, United States

- County
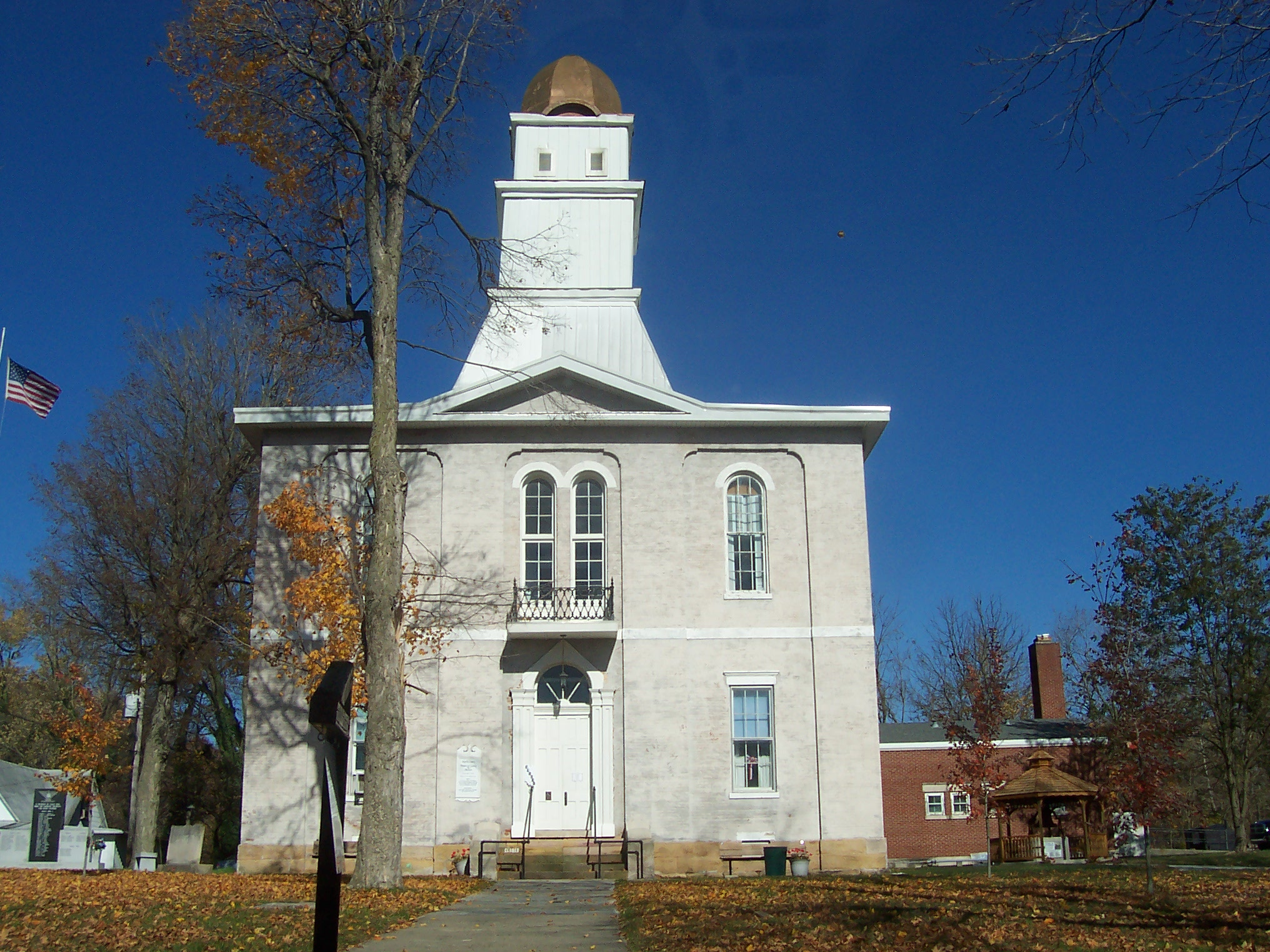
- Martin County Courthouse

- Location within the U.S. state of Indiana
- Coordinates: 38°43′N 86°48′W
- Country: United States
- State: Indiana
- Founded: January 20, 1820
- Named for: Major John T. Martin
- Seat: Shoals
- Largest city: Loogootee

Area
  - Total: 340.41 sq mi (881.7 km^{2})
  - Land: 335.74 sq mi (869.6 km^{2})
  - Water: 4.67 sq mi (12.1 km^{2}) 1.37%

Population (2020)
  - Total: 9,812
  - Estimate (2025): 9,856 ▲
  - Density: 29.22/sq mi (11.28/km^{2})
- Time zone: UTC−5 (Eastern)
  - Summer (DST): UTC−4 (EDT)
- Congressional district: 8th
- Website: www.in.gov/counties/martin/
- Indiana county number 51

Martin County is a county in the U.S. state of Indiana. As of the 2020 United States census, the population was 9,812. The county seat is Shoals at the center of the county, and the county's only incorporated city is Loogootee, on the county's western border.

== History ==
The Indiana Territory achieved statehood near the end of 1816. Shortly thereafter, the new state legislature created Dubois (December 1817) and Daviess (February 1818) counties. Due to the inflow of settlers into southwest Indiana, and the difficulty of accessing the county seats of those counties, Martin County was partitioned off from parts of those counties, being authorized on January 20, 1820. It was named for Maj. John T. Martin of Newport, Kentucky.

== Geography ==
The hills of Martin County are largely wooded and cut with drainages; the available area is devoted to agriculture, development, or is under control of the US government - about a third of the county belongs to the Naval Surface Warfare Center Crane Division, and about a quarter of the county belongs to Hoosier National Forest. The highest point (870 feet/270 meters ASL) is in Mitcheltree Township, within NSA Crane.

The East Fork of the White River flows southwestward through the lower part of the county. The central part of the county is drained by Indian Creek, which discharges into White River near the center of the county. The upper part of the county is drained by Boggs Creek, which discharges into White River near the county's western edge.

According to the 2010 census, the county has a total area of 340.41 square miles (881.7 km^{2}), of which 335.74 square miles (869.6 km^{2}) (or 98.63%) is land and 4.67 square miles (12.1 km^{2}) (or 1.37%) is water.

=== Adjacent counties ===
- Greene County - north
- Lawrence County - east
- Orange County - southeast
- Dubois County - south
- Daviess County - west

=== Protected areas ===
- Hoosier National Forest (part) in northeast and southeast parts of Martin County. Administered by US Forest Service
- Martin State Forest - in eastern part of Martin County. Administered by Indiana Department of Natural Resources

=== Lakes ===
- Greenwood Lake
- Seed Tick Lake
- West Boggs Lake (part)

== Highways ==
- U.S. Route 50
- U.S. Route 150
- U.S. Route 231
- State Road 450
- State Road 550
- State Road 650

=== City and towns ===
- Crane
- Loogootee (city)
- Shoals

=== Unincorporated communities ===
- Bramble
- Burns City (census-designated place)
- Cale
- Dover Hill (census-designated place)
- Hindostan Falls
- Indian Springs
- Ironton
- Lacy
- Mount Olive
- Mount Pleasant
- Natchez
- Padanaram
- Pleasant Valley
- Rusk
- Scenic Hill
- Shoals Overlook
- Trinity Springs
- Whitfield

=== Townships ===
- Center
- Halbert
- Lost River
- Mitcheltree
- Perry
- Rutherford

== Climate and weather ==
Shoals, Indiana

Climate chart (precipitation, max. and min. temperature)
J	F	M	A	M	J	J	A	S	O	N	D
3.2 37 19	2.9 43 22	4.3 54 31	4.5 65 40	5.6 75 50	4.2 83 59	4.7 86 64	3.8 85 62	3.4 79 54	3.1 68 42	4.5 54 34	3.5 42 24
- █ Average max. and min. temperatures in °F
- █ Precipitation totals in inches
- Source: The Weather Channel
Metric conversion
J	F	M	A	M	J	J	A	S	O	N	D
80 3 −7	74 6 −6	108 12 −1	114 18 4	142 24 10	108 28 15	120 30 18	96 29 17	85 26 12	80 20 6	114 12 1	90 6 −4
- █ Average max. and min. temperatures in °C
- █ Precipitation totals in mm

In recent years, average temperatures in Shoals have ranged from a low of 19 °F (−7 °C) in January to a high of 86 °F (30 °C) in July, although a record low of −23 °F (−31 °C) was recorded in January 1994 and a record high of 104 °F (40 °C) was recorded in July 1954. Average monthly precipitation ranged from 2.92 inches (74 mm) in February to 5.60 inches (142 mm) in May.

== Government ==
The county government is a constitutional body, and is granted specific powers by the Constitution of Indiana, and by the Indiana Code.

County Council: The legislative branch of the county government; controls spending and revenue collection in the county. Representatives are elected to four-year terms from county districts. They are responsible for setting salaries, the annual budget, and special spending. The council has limited authority to impose local taxes, in the form of an income and property tax that is subject to state level approval, excise taxes, and service taxes.

Board of Commissioners: The executive body of the county; commissioners are elected county-wide to staggered four-year terms. One commissioner serves as president. The commissioners execute the acts legislated by the council, collect revenue, and manage the county government.

Court: The county maintains a small claims court that handles civil cases. The judge on the court is elected to a term of four years and must be a member of the Indiana Bar Association. The judge is assisted by a constable who is also elected to a four-year term. In some cases, court decisions can be appealed to the state level circuit court.

County Officials: The county has other elected offices, including sheriff, coroner, auditor, treasurer, recorder, surveyor, and circuit court clerk. Officers are elected to four-year terms. Members elected to county government positions are required to declare party affiliations and to be residents of the county.

Martin County is part of Indiana's 8th congressional district; Indiana Senate district 39; and Indiana House of Representatives districts 62 and 63.

=== Political Culture ===
United States presidential election results for Martin County, Indiana
Year	Republican		Democratic		Third party(ies)	
Year	No.	%	No.	%	No.	%
1888	1,391	46.99%	1,558	52.64%	11	0.37%
1892	1,283	44.04%	1,391	47.75%	239	8.20%
1896	1,384	44.37%	1,719	55.11%	16	0.51%
1900	1,712	49.90%	1,660	48.38%	59	1.72%
1904	1,809	52.21%	1,574	45.43%	82	2.37%
1908	1,667	48.35%	1,733	50.26%	48	1.39%
1912	975	32.28%	1,440	47.68%	605	20.03%
1916	1,534	48.93%	1,549	49.41%	52	1.66%
1920	2,747	52.27%	2,443	46.49%	65	1.24%
1924	2,470	46.77%	2,669	50.54%	142	2.69%
1928	2,450	51.88%	2,245	47.54%	27	0.57%
1932	2,106	40.31%	3,072	58.79%	47	0.90%
1936	2,583	46.57%	2,923	52.70%	40	0.72%
1940	2,902	52.28%	2,638	47.52%	11	0.20%
1944	2,467	49.37%	2,515	50.33%	15	0.30%
1948	2,230	43.96%	2,788	54.96%	55	1.08%
1952	2,757	51.71%	2,546	47.75%	29	0.54%
1956	2,946	55.63%	2,343	44.24%	7	0.13%
1960	2,756	51.55%	2,585	48.35%	5	0.09%
1964	2,000	38.87%	3,137	60.96%	9	0.17%
1968	2,512	46.22%	2,315	42.59%	608	11.19%
1972	3,470	62.99%	2,021	36.69%	18	0.33%
1976	2,702	48.55%	2,827	50.80%	36	0.65%
1980	3,082	53.33%	2,479	42.90%	218	3.77%
1984	3,363	63.07%	1,937	36.33%	32	0.60%
1988	3,066	58.75%	2,132	40.85%	21	0.40%
1992	2,523	46.40%	2,018	37.11%	897	16.50%
1996	2,281	48.33%	1,848	39.15%	591	12.52%
2000	3,008	65.26%	1,518	32.94%	83	1.80%
2004	3,414	68.33%	1,522	30.46%	60	1.20%
2008	3,122	63.68%	1,706	34.80%	75	1.53%
2012	3,262	68.78%	1,351	28.48%	130	2.74%
2016	3,697	76.29%	881	18.18%	268	5.53%
2020	4,029	78.16%	1,011	19.61%	115	2.23%
2024	3,961	79.35%	933	18.69%	98	1.96%

== Education ==
School	Type	Enrollment	Mascot	Colors	IHSAA Class	Athletic Conference
Loogootee High School	Public	325	Lions		A	Blue Chip Conference
Shoals High School	Public	223	JugRox		A	Blue Chip Conference

== Demographics ==
Historical population
Census	Pop.	Note	%±
1820	1,032		—
1830	2,010		94.8%
1840	3,875		92.8%
1850	5,941		53.3%
1860	8,975		51.1%
1870	11,103		23.7%
1880	13,475		21.4%
1890	13,973		3.7%
1900	14,711		5.3%
1910	12,950		−12.0%
1920	11,865		−8.4%
1930	10,103		−14.9%
1940	10,300		1.9%
1950	10,678		3.7%
1960	10,608		−0.7%
1970	10,969		3.4%
1980	11,001		0.3%
1990	10,369		−5.7%
2000	10,369		0.0%
2010	10,334		−0.3%
2020	9,812		−5.1%
2025 (est.)	9,856	▲	0.4%
US Decennial Census; 1790-1960 1900-1990; 1990-2000 2010-2013

=== Racial and ethnic composition ===
Martin County, Indiana – Racial and ethnic composition Note: the US Census treats Hispanic/Latino as an ethnic category. This table excludes Latinos from the racial categories and assigns them to a separate category. Hispanics/Latinos may be of any race.
Race / Ethnicity (NH = Non-Hispanic)	Pop 1980	Pop 1990	Pop 2000	Pop 2010	Pop 2020	% 1980	% 1990	% 2000	% 2010	% 2020
White alone (NH)	10,898	10,316	10,225	10,125	9,335	99.06%	99.49%	98.61%	97.98%	95.14%
Black or African American alone (NH)	7	11	16	10	20	0.06%	0.11%	0.15%	0.10%	0.20%
Native American or Alaska Native alone (NH)	16	14	12	26	20	0.15%	0.14%	0.12%	0.25%	0.20%
Asian alone (NH)	36	14	15	29	33	0.33%	0.14%	0.14%	0.28%	0.34%
Native Hawaiian or Pacific Islander alone (NH)	x	x	3	0	6	x	x	0.03%	0.00%	0.06%
Other race alone (NH)	10	0	4	4	11	0.09%	0.00%	0.04%	0.04%	0.11%
Mixed race or Multiracial (NH)	x	x	52	70	295	x	x	0.50%	0.68%	3.01%
Hispanic or Latino (any race)	34	14	42	70	92	0.31%	0.14%	0.41%	0.68%	0.94%
Total	11,001	10,369	10,369	10,334	9,812	100.00%	100.00%	100.00%	100.00%	100.00%

=== 2020 census ===
As of the 2020 census, the county had a population of 9,812. The median age was 43.2 years. 22.9% of residents were under the age of 18 and 20.2% of residents were 65 years of age or older. For every 100 females there were 104.4 males, and for every 100 females age 18 and over there were 102.5 males age 18 and over.

The racial makeup of the county was 95.4% White, 0.2% Black or African American, 0.2% American Indian and Alaska Native, 0.4% Asian, 0.1% Native Hawaiian and Pacific Islander, 0.2% from some other race, and 3.5% from two or more races. Hispanic or Latino residents of any race comprised 0.9% of the population.

<0.1% of residents lived in urban areas, while 100.0% lived in rural areas.

There were 4,060 households in the county, of which 27.7% had children under the age of 18 living in them. Of all households, 48.8% were married-couple households, 20.9% were households with a male householder and no spouse or partner present, and 24.2% were households with a female householder and no spouse or partner present. About 31.4% of all households were made up of individuals and 14.1% had someone living alone who was 65 years of age or older.

There were 4,576 housing units, of which 11.3% were vacant. Among occupied housing units, 77.8% were owner-occupied and 22.2% were renter-occupied. The homeowner vacancy rate was 0.9% and the rental vacancy rate was 8.1%.

=== 2010 census ===
As of the 2010 United States census, there were 10,334 people, 4,216 households, and 2,832 families in the county. The population density was 30.8 inhabitants per square mile (11.9/km^{2}). There were 4,786 housing units at an average density of 14.3 per square mile (5.5/km^{2}). The racial makeup of the county was 98.4% white, 0.3% Asian, 0.3% American Indian, 0.1% black or African American, 0.2% from other races, and 0.7% from two or more races. Those of Hispanic or Latino origin made up 0.7% of the population. In terms of ancestry, 27.8% were German, 19.2% were Irish, 14.9% were English, and 12.7% were American.

Of the 4,216 households, 30.5% had children under the age of 18 living with them, 52.8% were married couples living together, 9.2% had a female householder with no husband present, 32.8% were non-families, and 28.7% of all households were made up of individuals. The average household size was 2.43 and the average family size was 2.98. The median age was 41.8 years.

The median income for a household in the county was $47,697 and the median income for a family was $55,017. Males had a median income of $41,411 versus $30,503 for females. The per capita income for the county was $21,750. About 8.6% of families and 13.0% of the population were below the poverty line, including 21.2% of those under age 18 and 9.1% of those age 65 or over.

== See also ==
- National Register of Historic Places listings in Martin County, Indiana
