= Shoals, Indiana =

- Town
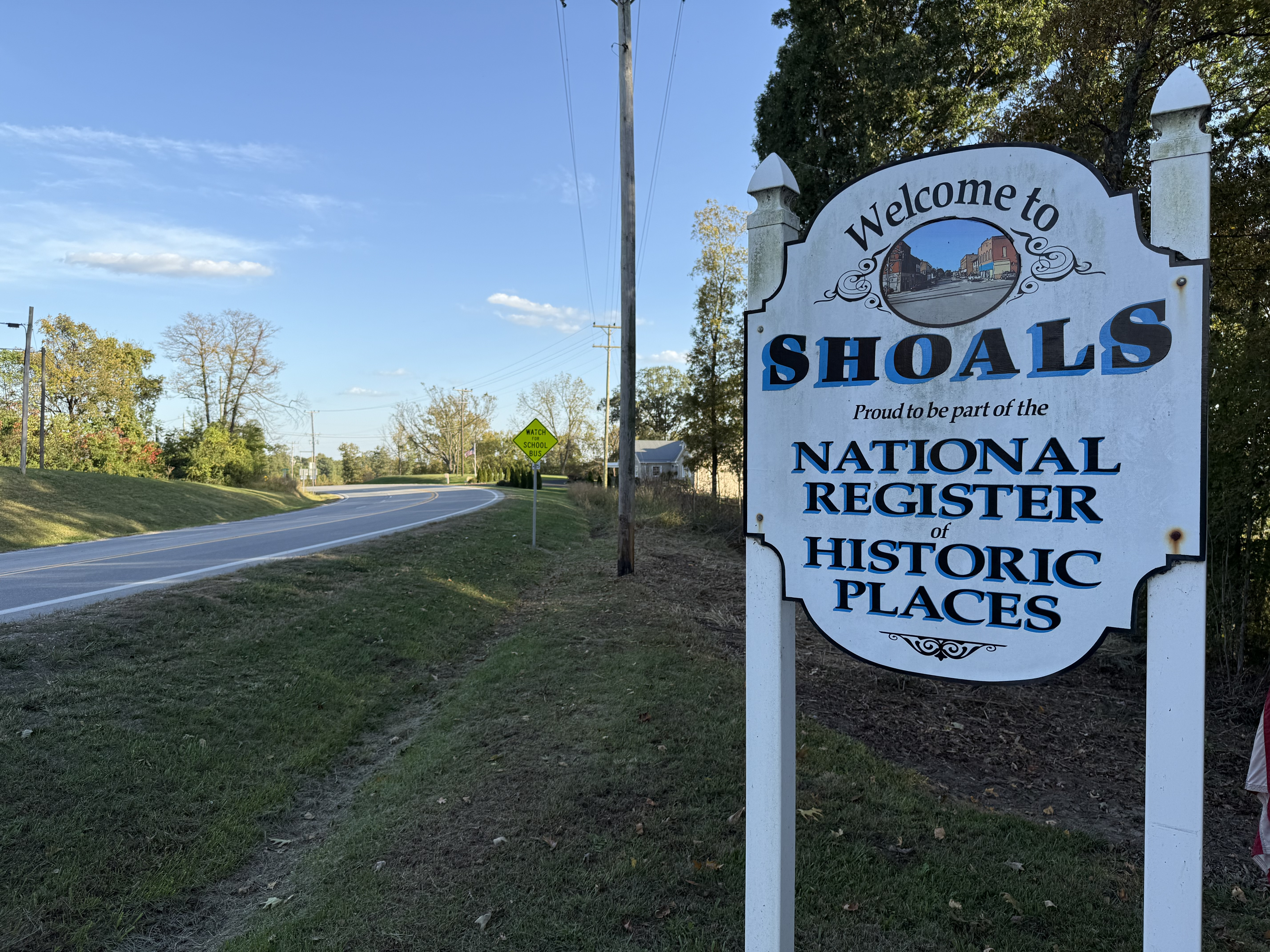
- Shoals, Indiana

- Location in Martin County, Indiana
- Coordinates: 38°40′01″N 86°47′38″W
- Country: United States
- State: Indiana
- County: Martin
- Townships: Center, Halbert

Area
  - Total: 1.92 sq mi (4.97 km^{2})
  - Land: 1.82 sq mi (4.72 km^{2})
  - Water: 0.097 sq mi (0.25 km^{2})
- Elevation: 453 ft (138 m)

Population (2020)
  - Total: 677
  - Density: 371.2/sq mi (143.32/km^{2})
- Time zone: UTC-5 (Eastern (EST))
  - Summer (DST): UTC-4 (EDT)
- ZIP code: 47581
- Area codes: 812, 930
- FIPS code: 18-69552
- GNIS feature ID: 2397661
- Website: www.townofshoals.org

Shoals is a town in Center and Halbert townships and the county seat of Martin County, in the U.S. state of Indiana. The population was 677 at the 2020 census.

Shoals is best known for the Jug Rock, the only free-standing table rock formation east of the Mississippi River.

== History ==
Shoals was originally called "Memphis"; under the latter name, the community was platted in 1844. The post office at Shoals has been in operation since 1869.

A lynching took place at the county courthouse and jail. The Archer boys were accused of torturing and killing a local farmer and were hanged from trees in front of the jail in 1886.

Shoals is known for making mother of pearl buttons during the early 20th century. They were made out of mussels from the White River.

== Geography ==
Shoals is located south of the center of Martin County. The East Fork of the White River flows through the center of town, running south and west to join the White River northeast of Petersburg.

U.S. Routes 50 and 150 pass through the center of Shoals as 4th Street, leading west 7 miles (11 km) to Loogootee, the only city in the county. US 50 leads northeast 24 miles (39 km) to Bedford, while US 150 leads southeast 22 miles (35 km) to Paoli.

According to the U.S. Census Bureau, Shoals has a total area of 1.92 square miles (4.97 km^{2}), of which 1.82 square miles (4.71 km^{2}) are land and 0.10 square miles (0.26 km^{2}), or 4.95%, are water.

=== Climate ===
The climate in this area is characterized by hot, humid summers and generally mild to cool winters. According to the Köppen Climate Classification system, Shoals has a humid subtropical climate, abbreviated "Cfa" on climate maps.

== Demographics ==
Historical population
Census	Pop.	Note	%±
1870	513		—
1880	706		37.6%
1890	738		4.5%
1900	683		−7.5%
1910	1,015		48.6%
1920	1,034		1.9%
1930	1,128		9.1%
1940	1,031		−8.6%
1950	1,039		0.8%
1960	1,022		−1.6%
1970	1,039		1.7%
1980	967		−6.9%
1990	853		−11.8%
2000	807		−5.4%
2010	756		−6.3%
2020	677		−10.4%
U.S. Decennial Census

=== 2010 census ===
As of the census of 2010, there were 756 people, 376 households, and 189 families living in the town. The population density was 422.3 inhabitants per square mile (163.1/km^{2}). There were 418 housing units at an average density of 233.5 per square mile (90.2/km^{2}). The racial makeup of the town was 97.4% White, 0.3% African American, 0.1% Native American, 0.3% Asian, 0.4% from other races, and 1.6% from two or more races. Hispanic or Latino of any race were 1.3% of the population.

There were 376 households, of which 23.7% had children under the age of 18 living with them, 32.7% were married couples living together, 13.0% had a female householder with no husband present, 4.5% had a male householder with no wife present, and 49.7% were non-families. 46.0% of all households were made up of individuals, and 22.4% had someone living alone who was 65 years of age or older. The average household size was 2.01 and the average family size was 2.81.

The median age in the town was 47.1 years. 20.1% of residents were under the age of 18; 7% were between the ages of 18 and 24; 20.8% were from 25 to 44; 27.3% were from 45 to 64; and 24.6% were 65 years of age or older. The gender makeup of the town was 49.1% male and 50.9% female.

=== 2000 census ===
As of the census of 2000, there were 807 people, 377 households, and 214 families living in the town. The population density was 448.0 inhabitants per square mile (173.0/km^{2}). There were 420 housing units at an average density of 233.1 per square mile (90.0/km^{2}). The racial makeup of the town was 97.52% White, 0.87% African American, 0.25% Native American, 0.12% from other races, and 1.24% from two or more races. Hispanic or Latino of any race were 1.49% of the population.

There were 377 households, out of which 19.1% had children under the age of 18 living with them, 41.1% were married couples living together, 12.5% had a female householder with no husband present, and 43.0% were non-families. 38.5% of all households were made up of individuals, and 20.2% had someone living alone who was 65 years of age or older. The average household size was 2.01 and the average family size was 2.65.

In the town, the population was spread out, with 17.0% under the age of 18, 8.9% from 18 to 24, 24.9% from 25 to 44, 26.3% from 45 to 64, and 22.9% who were 65 years of age or older. The median age was 44 years. For every 100 females, there were 100.7 males. For every 100 females age 18 and over, there were 98.8 males.

The median income for a household in the town was $23,750, and the median income for a family was $31,964. Males had a median income of $30,865 versus $21,696 for females. The per capita income for the town was $14,234. About 14.6% of families and 20.4% of the population were below the poverty line, including 33.0% of those under age 18 and 8.1% of those age 65 or over.

== Economy ==
Shoals' major employers are the gypsum mines that were discovered in the mid-20th century. Two major mines employ more than 400 workers. The National Gypsum mine is located 2 miles (3 km) east of Shoals and is the United States' deepest at 515 feet (157 m).

The gypsum mine and factory in Shoals, Indiana, is operated by National Gypsum. The mine, which started operations in the 1950s, is about 400–500 feet underground. It supplies gypsum for the production of drywall and other related products directly at the surface manufacturing plant. National Gypsum extracts around 80–100 truckloads of gypsum daily to produce materials like wallboard, and the facility employs around 190–200 people. This integration of mining and manufacturing is efficient, as the gypsum is mined, processed, and turned into drywall all in one location.

== Education ==
The town has a lending library, the Shoals Public Library. Public education is administered by Shoals Public Schools.

== Notable people ==
- Frank Gilkison, justice of the Indiana Supreme Court
