= Johnsonville =

Johnsonville may refer to:

== Geography ==
=== Australia ===
- Johnsonville, Victoria

=== New Zealand ===
- Johnsonville, New Zealand

=== United States ===
- Johnsonville, Alabama
- Johnsonville, California, former name of Bear Valley, Mariposa County, California
- Johnsonville, Illinois
- Johnsonville, Indiana
- Johnsonville, New York
- Johnsonville, South Carolina
- Johnsonville, North Carolina
- Johnsonville, Randolph County, North Carolina
- Johnsonville Township, Harnett County, North Carolina
- Johnsonville, Tennessee, a former town replaced by New Johnsonville, Tennessee
- Johnsonville, Wisconsin, an incorporated village
- Johnsonville Township, Minnesota
- Johnsonville Village, Connecticut, an abandoned ghost town

== Company ==
- Johnsonville (company), American sausage company

== History ==
- Battle of Johnsonville

== See also ==
- Johnstonville
