= Early career of Andrew Jackson =

The biography of Andrew Jackson (lifespan, 1767–1845; U.S. presidency, 1829–1837) is scant until he was 30 years old. The first major critical work on Jackson was James Parton's three-volume biography, which was published just before the beginning of the American Civil War. Parton did extensive original research but many of the principal figures of Jackson's early life were long dead by the time he began his interviews. Few of Jackson's allies wrote memoirs. Several key figures did leave behind valuable tranches of correspondence but most of these sources disclose little detail about Jackson's youth or young adulthood. In the words of one historian, "There is little that is actually known of his early life save the broad outline sketched by the General himself. Jackson was keenly interested in the presentation and interpretation of his political and military career and made an effort to furnish his biographers with the information he had, but his friends could get from him concerning his youth only brief stories and incidents. There is no connected narrative. For the most part he was content to refer would-be biographers to the work written by his friends, Major John S. Reid and Major John Henry Eaton, which was first published in 1817," when Jackson was 50 years old. Reid was a highly educated Virginia-born lawyer who served as Jackson's primary amaneusis during the Creek War and War of 1812. Eaton was a general-purpose henchman. Both were sons-in-law of longtime Jackson cronies and both were determined to promote Jackson on the national stage; their work, though foundational, is foremost political campaign propaganda, and the first of many Jackson biographies that "hewed to the interpretation of Jackson as nationalist hero." (Note: Other historians argue that the American nationalist idea of Jackson was largely constructed post-bellum, while prior to the American Civil War, Jackson's image was that of a Southern hero, "a bulwark against the nationalism that threatened their political and social world," and that as much as he was a killer of "redcoat and redskin," he was also a Carolinian and a Tennessean "who early began to accumulate two possessions dear to white southerners—land and black slaves—[which] clearly identified him as one of them. That personal identity, easily spilling over into politics, assumed striking importance.")

Development of Tennessee, one of two New Deal art projects murals painted by Dean Cornwell in 1940 for the John Sevier State Office Building in Nashville, depicts Andrew Jackson, Nathan Bedford Forrest, and James Robertson "bidding his wife goodbye" and "reunited with his wife at Nashborough after her voyage on John Donelson's Adventure

When examining Jackson's business dealings it may be helpful to know that currency on the frontier was a mixed bag, and constantly changing. In late 18th-century North America, British pounds commingled with Spanish reals, Continental "paper" had its day, there were state-issued notes, the embryonic U.S. dollar debuted in 1792, "warehouse receipts" and promissory notes of wildly varying reliability flowed from trading post to commercial port and back again, and there was a complex barter and credit system involving anything imaginable but especially tobacco, cotton, horses, chattel slaves, real estate titles, pelts and furs, guns and ammunition, and distilled spirits. Young Jackson was in business at a time and place when "Money was scarce, and the interchange of goods was difficult and hazardous. Barter was still commonly employed in conducting commercial transactions." Also, as one historian summarized Hickory's entrepreneurial career in 2007: "Jackson was obsessive about his wealth; money seemed always in short supply, and loans were a way of life."

== Education, early friends and acquaintances ==
One investigation of Jackson's education concluded, "It is probable that Andrew Jackson attended such schools as were available in his time and in his community and that he attended none of them for any long period." Teachers and schools mentioned in biographies by Reid, Marquis James, and Hendrik Booraem are William Humphries, Robert McCulloch, "an English school," "Francis Cummins's 'classical' boarding school in the New Acquisition," and "possibly" one term at Liberty Hall Academy in Charlotte, North Carolina. Jackson might (or might not) have spent some time at the short-lived Queen's College in Charlotte.

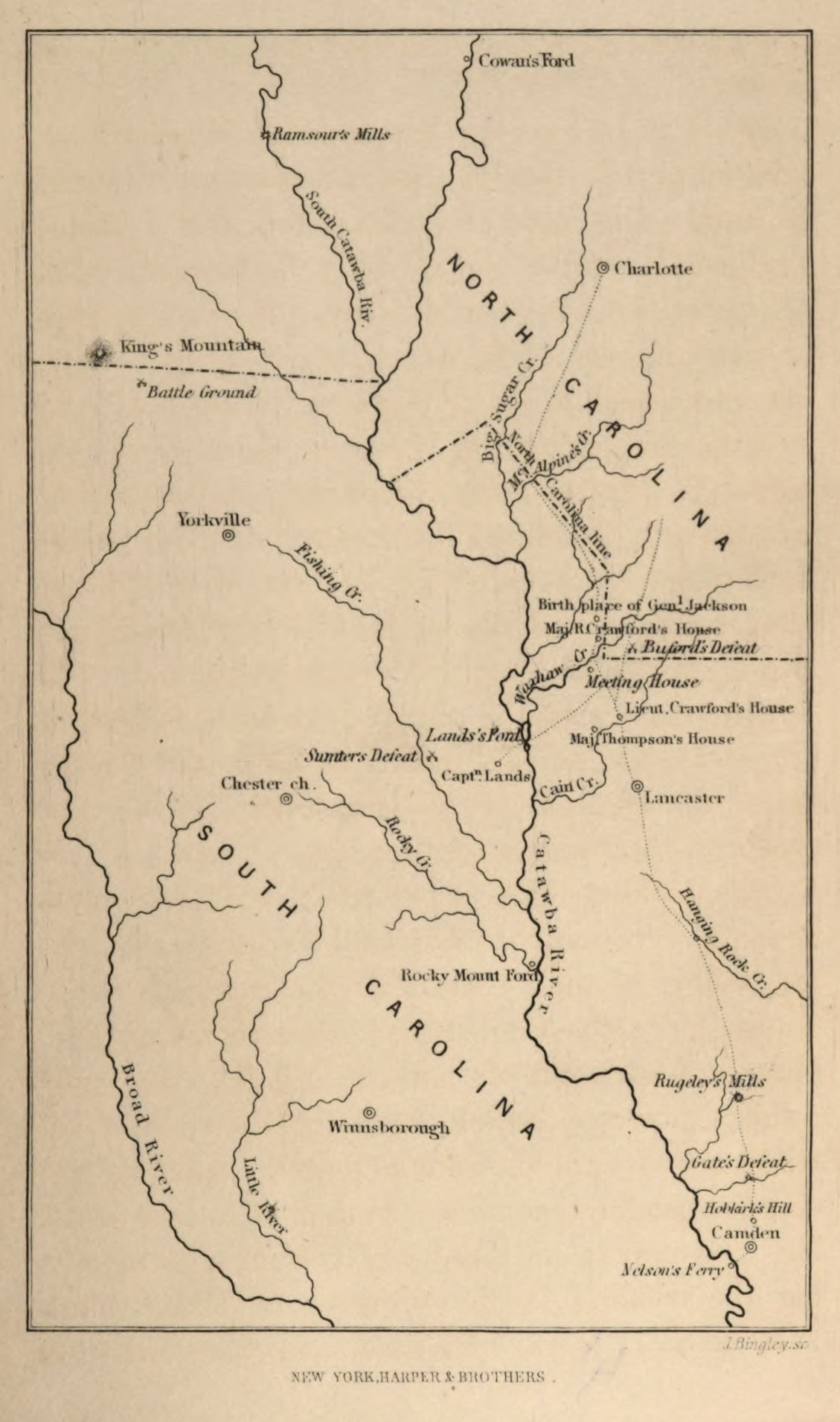
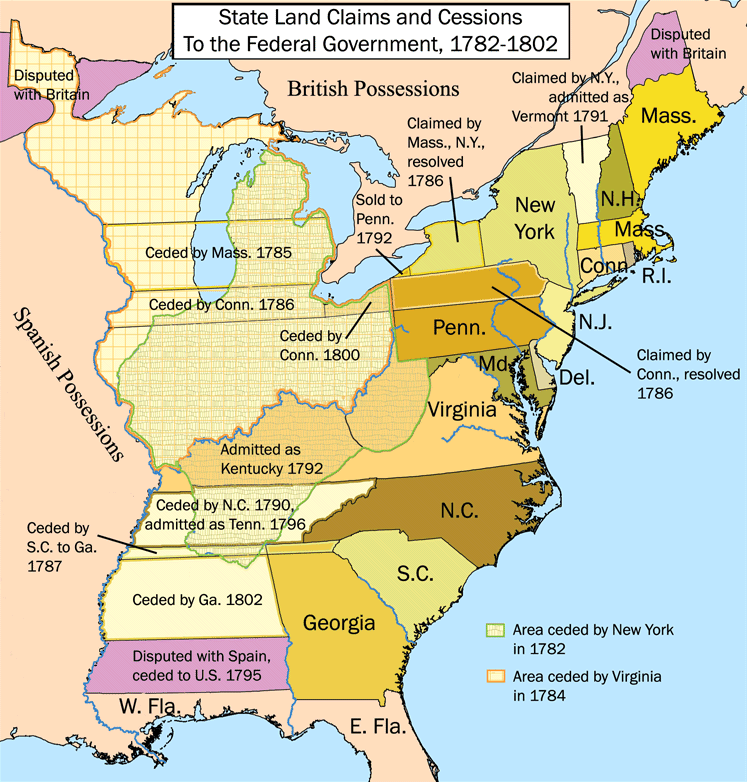
Carolinas boundary change in 1772, key towns in North Carolina, Waxhaws in Jackson's time, America east of the Mississippi to 1802

Jackson went to school with William Smith, future U.S. Senator from South Carolina and long-time Jackson confidant. (Note: Jackson tried twice to appoint "Judge Smith," as he was called, to the Supreme Court of the United States, but the aged, notably cantankerous, and very wealthy Smith declined in both cases.) They attended a school at Bullock's Creek, in the "District between Broad and Catawba Rivers," taught by Rev. Mr. Joseph Alexander, who also had a school in the Waxhaws. The curriculum included Greek, Latin, reading, and mathematics. One letter written in 1813 holds that Jackson and the author attended school with "old Mr. Stephenson on the Catabaw," meaning James White Stephenson, later a reverend of the Presbyterian Church. Jackson was also said to be childhood friends with Joshua Gordon (1765–1845), author of the 1784 Witchcraft Book, which was a 22-page treatise concerned with "cures and spells, and...treating sick livestock."

== Gambling (⪅1784–?) ==
Antebellum American horseracing: Currier & Ives lithograph of 1845 contest at Long Island between Fashion and Peytona, a daughter of Glencoe, a champion horse owned by Andrew Jackson's former friend and banker James Jackson

Gambling wins and losses from bets on horse races and cockfights were a consistent element of Andrew Jackson's income and outgo.

One of the preserved anecdotes of his early life tells that, in 1784, while living in Charleston, South Carolina, he "saved his horse from having a new owner" by winning at rattle and snap, which was a dice game similar to craps. The neighbors recalled that while he was resident in Salisbury, N.C., he "played cards, fought cocks, ran horses, threw the 'long bullet'...carried off gates, moved outhouses to remote fields, and occasionally engaged in a downright drunken debauch." In Nashville, it was said of Jackson: "He had fine horses an he run 'em, he had fine cocks an he fit 'em." He also "probably gambled some with cards...[and] was devoted to the game of billiards." Jackson had a horse track and cock pit in Mississippi Territory. Jackson and friends organized a "cocking ring" to celebrate Independence Day at McNairy's Spring in Nashville in 1809.

Jackson was co-owner of a racetrack and tavern at Stone's River. There was gambling going on in this establishment, as well as throughout the settlement. (According to court records, popular hobbies in the Cumberland included a card game called loo, another game called fives, and the crime "assault and battery.") In the 1810s, proprietors of a similar tavern in Bath County, Kentucky billed "one-half pint of whisky or peach or apple brandy at 12 1/2 cents, and one-half pint of brandy or rum at 50 cents. In this same tavern a night's lodging cost 16 2/3 cents and dinner 25 cents."

According to one study of sports and sports betting in the early American republic, "Andrew Jackson had made friends through cockfighting and racing...maintained an active racing stable through his presidency, and used his image as an active sportsman to appeal to voters."

== Clerking and lawyering in North Carolina and the Southwest Territory (1787–1798) ==
1785 British map of the United States

Biographer James Parton wrote in 1861 that while Jackson had acquired "the little legal knowledge necessary" to practice frontier law "he never became, in any proper sense of the word, a lawyer." Historian C. Edward Skeen, in a review of The Legal Papers of Andrew Jackson (1987), stated, "Historians have written little about Andrew Jackson's law practice and career as judge of the Superior Court of Tennessee...this period of his life is largely a void...The editors are to be applauded for their considerable effort in producing this volume, but it would appear that all they have shown is that the documentary evidence of Jackson's legal career is too skimpy to be recovered."

=== Training ===
Information about Jackson's legal education is "sketchy and uncertain." In December 1784 he went to Morgantown, North Carolina, and sought the tutelage of Waightstill Avery, "a Princeton graduate and former state attorney general who...declined to take him on as a student." He then studied with lawyer Charles Bruce in Martinville, which was named for its chief resident, Founding Father Alexander Martin. Local lore has it that he may have worked at the "mercantile establishment" of Thomas Henderson and Thomas Searcy during his time in Guilford County—or very possibly the three were simply acquaintances who raced horses and fought cocks together. (Note: There was another Andrew Jackson in the county who served as constable and in other "various small positions" and died in 1806.) Jackson read law in early 1786 at the Salisbury, North Carolina law office of Spruce Macay, a socially connected lawyer and later a North Carolina state judge and state legislator. In late 1786 Jackson moved to the Montgomery County, North Carolina, law office of John Stokes.

=== North Carolina lawyer ===
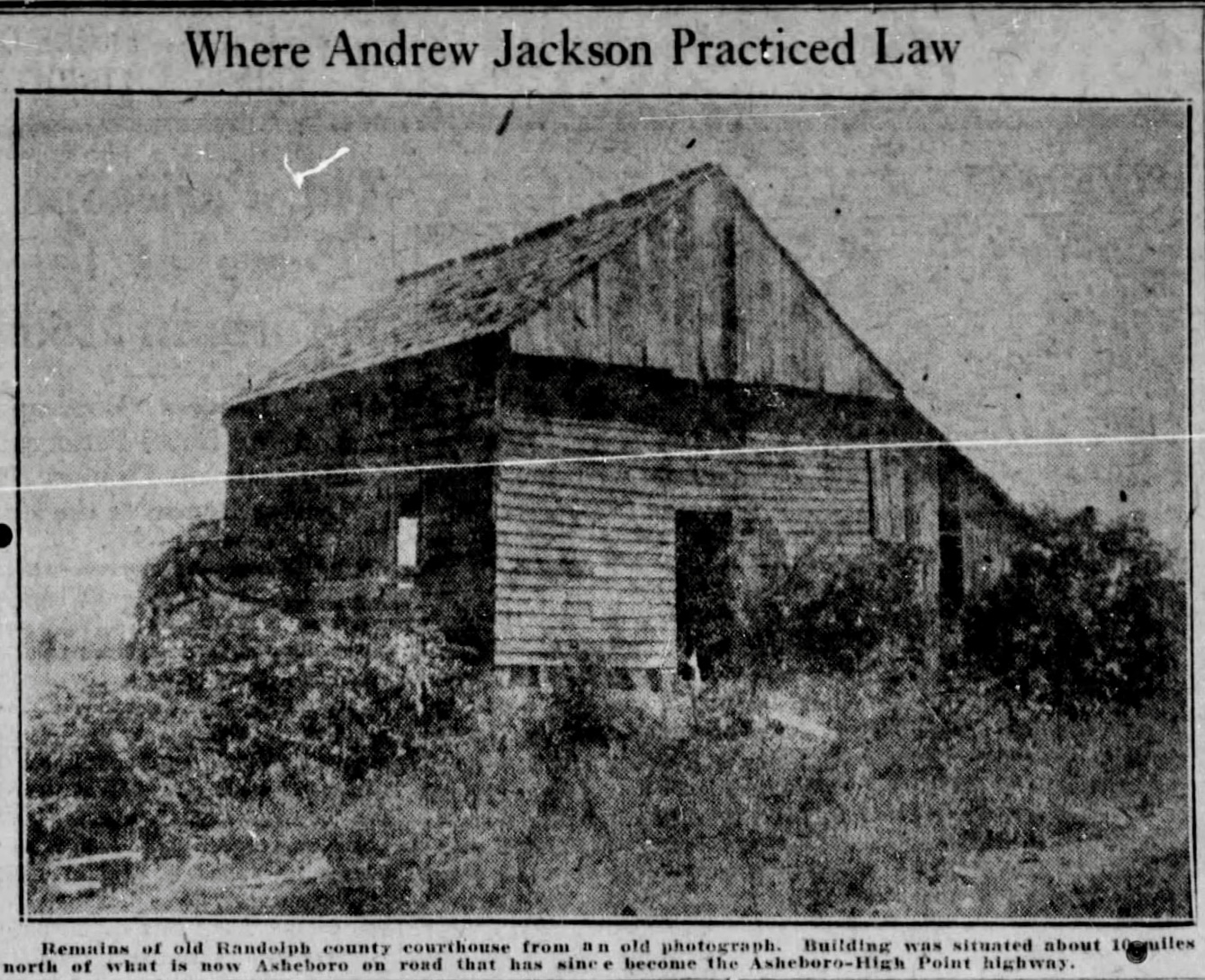
Randolph County, North Carolina courthouse at the now-extinct crossroads town of Johnstonville

Jackson was tested by two judges, Samuel Ashe and John F. Williams, and admitted to the bar of North Carolina in September 1787. He then "drifted" through western North Carolina, handling cases in Randolph and Rockingham counties, but "it seems apparent...that Jackson found it difficult to attract clients." Among the cases Jackson handled at the Johnstonville courthouse in Randolph County was a dispute over beehives. Another surviving record from Randolph County states, "On motion of Andrew Jackson, Esquire, attorney for Absalom Tatum, it is ordered that Adam Tate, Coroner of Rockingham County, be fined 50 pounds nisi for failing to return fiere facias against John May, Sheriff of said county, at the instance of Absalom Tatum and that fiere facias issue accordingly."

=== Mero District attorney ===
Territory Southwest of the River Ohio in 1790: Tennessee County settlements were centered on the drainage of the Red River near present-day Clarksville; Davidson County included parts of what are now Williamson, Rutherford, and Cheatham counties

Jackson was 21 years old when he arrived in "Nashboro" in October 1788. He was invited to the Mero District by his friend and fellow Macay law clerk John McNairy, judge of the Davidson County Superior Court, and was granted the unpaid position of county prosecutor and "acted as attorney-general for the state" at the November 1788 and May 1789 terms of the Superior Court. He was eventually granted a salary of £40. Jackson prosecuted 85 crimes "on behalf of North Carolina or the territorial government," predominantly assault and battery, some petty larceny, perjury, and horse thievery, as well as two felony murders, and one rape. He also "instituted more than thirty scire facias proceedings on behalf of the territorial government, presumably to collect fines for statutory offenses against court."

=== Private practice ===
Jackson also developed a private practice, filing more than 400 suits for clients between 1788 and 1798, predominantly in the Davidson and Sumner county courts, and the Mero District Superior Court. Matters at issue included lame horses, chattel slaves, real estate, and 1,453 pounds of beaver pelts. In the telling of legal historian James Ely, "Jackson's service to his clients involved more than preparation of pleadings and arguments in court. He functioned partly as a collection official and land agent. One client, on the losing side of a lawsuit, requested Jackson to convey a portion of a tract 'to the use of Setling the Judgment...obtained against me.' He further instructed Jackson: 'Sell the Balance for any kind of Trade and we can Settle when I return in the Spring.' On at least two occasions Jackson signed as security on his client's prosecution bond." Other lawyers working the vicinity at the same time included Josiah Love, John Overton, Bennett Searcy, and Howell Tatum; between the five of them they handled almost all the litigation in middle Tennessee. Jackson's legal practice was at its zenith in 1794 and 1795, after which he became more concerned with commerce and politics. There are only scant records that might illuminate Jackson's legal arguments but all of the legal systems in the Cumberland showed a "degree of continuity with colonial and English legal roots." In both his public and private work, debt recovery was one of his specialties and since "he was on the side of the creditors, merchants were pleased to make use of his services."

=== Reputation ===
Andrew Jackson duel challenge to Waightstill Avery, 1788

With regard to his reputation as an attorney, biographer and first editor of his collected papers John Spencer Bassett wrote "He was, no doubt, but little versed in the law." There are multiple versions of how Jackson came to challenge Waightsill Avery to a duel in 1788, but one retold in a history of western North Carolina had it that "Jackson had ridiculed Avery's pet authority—Bacon's Abridgment," and Avery's reply was "sarcastic...intimating that Jackson had much to learn before he would be competent to criticize any law book whatever." In 1796, John Sevier referred to Jackson as a "poor, pitifull, petty fogging Lawyer" (but two years later saw fit to appoint him to the Tennessee state bench). When the Magnesses were tried in 1810 for the murder of Jackson's friend and occasional business partner Patton Anderson, Alfred Balch was the prosecutor, and Felix Grundy and Jenkin Whiteside were the defense attorneys; Jackson was not involved in the trial except as a witness—"he was licensed to practice law and had served as a judge, but he and Anderson's friends had no delusions about his legal abilities." Ely states that Jackson was well-regarded in the community in his time: "Jackson experienced considerable success as a lawyer and enjoyed a favorable reputation. One litigant wrote to a friend: 'I wish you to put my Papers into the hands of an Attorney Lawyer Jackson if you can or into Mr. Overton or some good attorney...'...At the time of his death in 1793 [Josiah] Love had the largest case load [in the Mero District]. Second to Love at the latter's death, Jackson represented more clients than any other attorney for the period 1788–1796. Another measure of his standing in the profession is that Love and Searcy asked Jackson to represent them in private litigation."

Bettina Drew argued in her influential thesis Andrew Jackson: Indian Removal and the Culture of Slavery (2001) that "Jackson was a continual law-breaker whose conception of the law was deeply Southern in orientation...In the slave-holding worldview, the law was an instrument of the master—the master was not, ideally, an instrument of the law—and it is this idea that Andrew Jackson lived by." Historian Edward Pessen argued similarly: "The contempt for authority and law that characterized his youthful and early adult life in Tennessee is clearly discernible in his later acts. Florida boundary, War Department orders, Marshall Court decisions, Congressional resolutions, all got equally short shrift. The arrogance, the disingenuousness, the cruel disregard for the rights of Indians, the highhandedness, the egotism bordering on egomania, the intolerance, the joy in hating, the emotionalism, the pettiness, the vindictiveness, that mark his career before 1828 continued to manifest themselves afterwards."

== Farming (1792–1845) ==
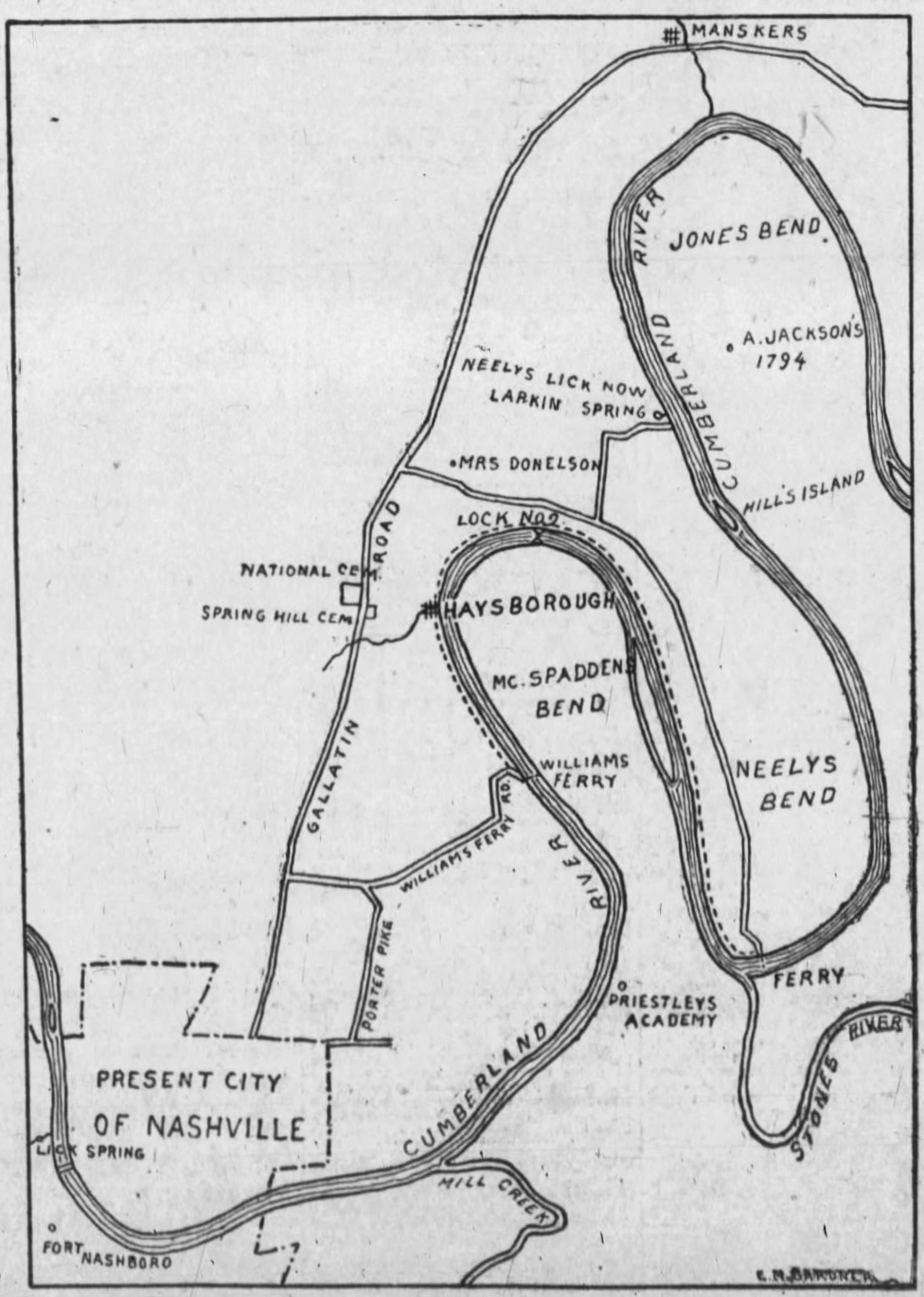
Map showing location of Poplar Grove on Jones' Bend and Haysborough, settled by his brother-in-law Robert Hays, where Jackson reportedly got his mail in early days

In Tennessee, Jackson farmed at Poplar Grove, and then Hunter's Hill, and finally at the Hermitage beginning in 1804. He used overseers beginning in 1795, and his wife Rachel is frequently credited with holding together the slave-labor farm at the Hermitage during her lifetime, during the many periods when Jackson traveled for business, politics, recreation, and conquest. According to a study of agriculture in Tennessee by Harriette Simpson Arnow, "Jackson's letters in particular are relatively untouched with remarks on the nature of the soil about him, the weather, and the swing of the crops through the seasons...farming was for Andrew Jackson...a capitalistic enterprise in which he invested, not himself, but only money." One historian wrote of his agricultural investments: "He did not make as brilliant a success in farming as some of his neighbors. He lived in too high a manner for that." The "high manner" problems included imprudent financial investments, status symbol purchases, and extravagant wagers on sporting events. Still, Jackson "valued land and the independence that it provided; the success of his 'farms,' or plantations, consumed much of his free time throughout his public career."

== Shopkeeping (1795–1807) ==
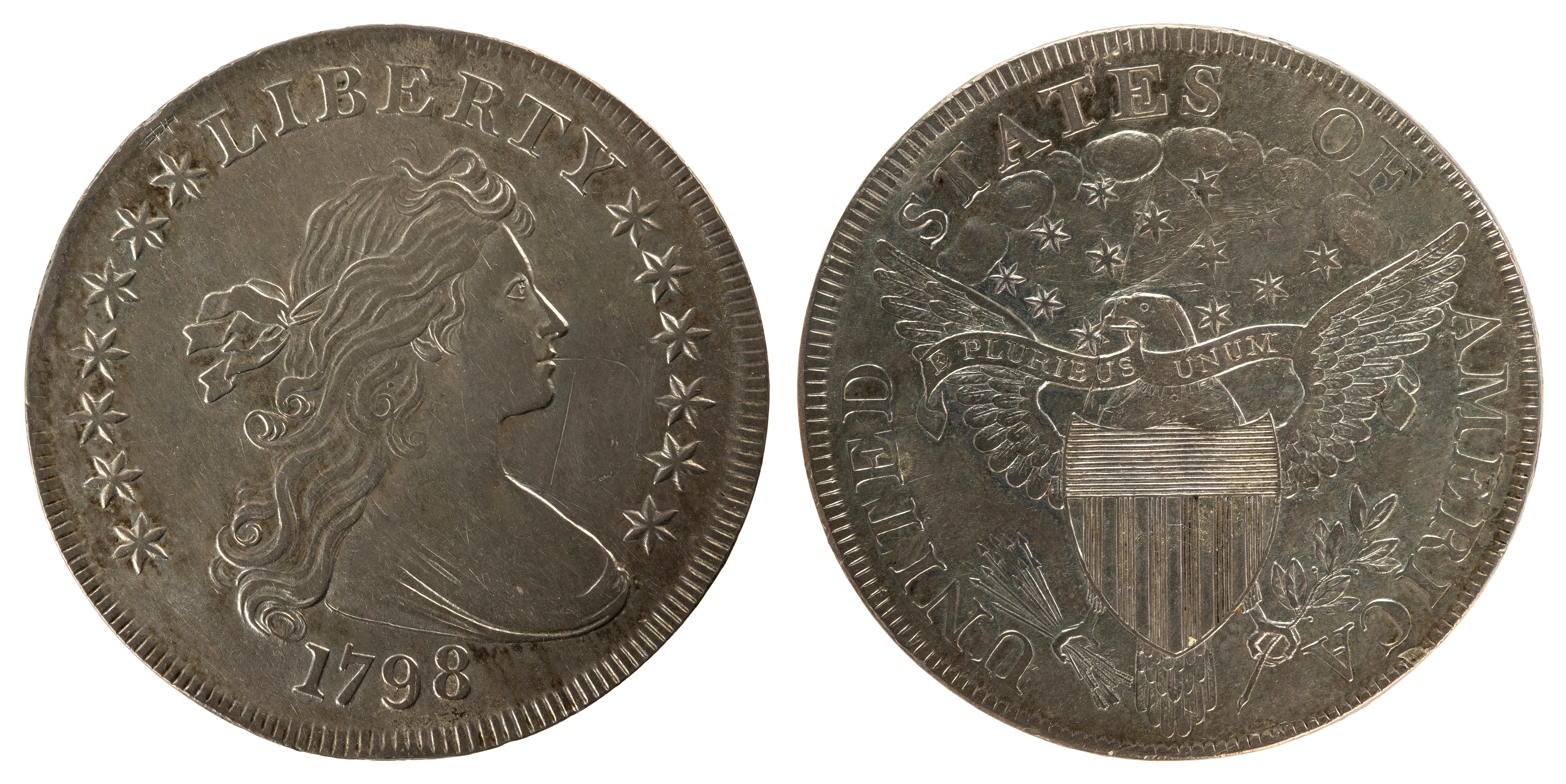
1798 "draped bust" dollar coin

According to the editors of The Papers of Andrew Jackson, "Between 1795 and 1807 Jackson followed general-store merchandising at least as fully as farming, the law, or the military." About 20 account books survive from Jackson's stores. Goods from Philadelphia resold in the Cumberland were marked up triple. Cotton from the Cumberland resold for double in New Orleans. Products for sale include fabric, "salt, grindstones, hardware, gunpowder, cow bells, and whatever else the people of the neighborhood wanted. In payment for these commodities, they took, not money, but cotton, ginned and unginned, wheat, corn, tobacco, pork, skins, furs, and, indeed, all the produce of the country." Middle Tennessee had originally produced mostly corn and stock animals, but by 1800 cotton had become so lucrative a cash crop that cotton bales served as a local currency. As explained by a news writer in 1882, to be a merchant in Nashville at the turn of the 19th century was "vastly different" than it would be even 50 years later because the nation was then just beginning to build the vast internal transportation and communications networks necessary for commerce, and "Merchants usually kept a miscellaneous stock of goods, which stock was annually replaced by a visit to Baltimore or Boston. For several years goods were hauled by wagon from Baltimore to Nashville." In addition to manufactured goods, stock animals, and cotton, frontier Tennessee merchants dealt in slaves. For instance, in 1805, Jackson and his nephew accepted $25 in cash and "A Negro Woman namd. Fan a bout forty five years of age" to pay off Andrew Steele's $150 past-due account at their store.

There were several stores in Tennessee and, briefly, one at a "cantonment" in what is now Alabama. Jackson's brother-in-law Samuel Donelson helped him open one such store at Clover Bottom in 1795, collecting goods that Jackson had sent down the Ohio River from Pittsburgh to Limestone, Kentucky, then bringing them overland down to Davidson County. The account books for this store use pounds, shillings, and pence. Among their many customers was Robert "Black Bob" Renfro, the keeper of a tavern in Nashville, to whom Jackson sold fabric, wine, and flatwares. The account book for this store includes several notations suggesting that it was perhaps used by men who held accounts with Jackson as a payroll service for hired-out slaves: "paid Negro George for you 10 shillings...paid a Negro pr your Verbial O[rder]...paid Negro for you 6 pence...[paid] your Order Negro Tom 2 pence...[paid] your Order favour Negro Nan 1 shilling 6 pence..." Goods for sale included "coffee, tea, sugar, chocolate, raisins, wine, pepper, 'Tobaccho', 'segars', knives, tea kettles, paper, ink, gloves, hosiery, combs, needles, linen, calico, handkerchiefs, ladies' and gentlemen's hats, bridles, stirrups, history and spelling books, and one entitled Hamilton on Female Complaints, to list just a sample!" However, since Jackson had bought all this based on the value of David Allison's notes, and Allison was defaulting, Jackson now owed the wholesale merchants in Philadelphia, and by June 1796, "The store had to be sold so Jackson's creditors could be paid. Jackson & Co. was dissolved...the brothers-in-law took a considerable financial beating."

In February 1802 he partnered with nephew John Hutchings and neighbor Thomas Watson in a store at Lebanon, two cotton gins, and a distillery. Watson exited the business in July 1803. Jackson was an investor in a "stand" at a "cantonment" on the Tennessee River near what is now Tuscumbia. Jackson and Hutchings jointly invested in the Clover Bottom development in approximately 1804–1805. John Coffee was a third partner at Clover Bottom. They bought deerskins and bear pelts, and they sold "silk, velvet, cashmere, Irish linen, slippers, parasols, gloves and other finery."

== Early participation in state and national politics (1796–1798) ==
Abraham Bradley's 1796 map of the postal routes of the United States

Andrew Jackson was a delegate to the 1796 Tennessee constitutional convention from middle Tennessee, along with Thomas Hardeman, Joel Lewis, John McNairy, and James Robertson. Jackson was an at-large U.S. Representative from Tennessee from December 5, 1796, to September 1797 (resigned), and a U.S. Senator from Tennessee from September 26, 1797, until April 1798 (resigned) during the 4th and 5th U.S. Congresses, which met at Philadelphia. Regarding his politics and his political achievements, historian Harold C. Syrett argued in 1953:

As a lawyer, public official, plantation owner, slaveholder, land speculator and merchant, he belonged to the region's upper class, and he and his fellow aristocrats formed an oligarchy that frequently controlled their state's political machinery and always dominated its economic life. In national affairs Jackson was a follower of Jefferson rather than of Washington and Hamilton, but at home in Tennessee he belonged to the small group of 'nabobs' who consistently opposed and repeatedly thwarted the aspirations of the more numerous small farmers or 'leathershirts'. While serving as a delegate to Tennessee's constitutional convention, a Representative in Congress, a Senator, a member of his state's highest court, and the first American governor of the Florida territory, Jackson did not once espouse a policy that was designed to aid the majority or to weaken the control of the minority over the government. If, as Frederick Jackson Turner has asserted, democracy was a product of the frontier, it flourished in that region in spite of the efforts of the nation's most famous Westerner and the era's most renowned Democrat...Jackson did not become identified with popular government until relatively late in life, and even then he aligned himself with the democratic movement in much the same fashion as a man who agrees to a marriage of convenience that has been arranged by prudent parents.

— Andrew Jackson: his contribution to the American tradition

== Tennessee state judge (1798–1804) ==
From 1798 to 1804, Jackson was one of three judges of the Tennessee Superior Court of Law and Equity. This was the state superior and appeals court, the lower courts were called Tennessee Courts of Common Pleas and Quarter Sessions. This was a combined criminal and civil court that "met twice annually in three judicial districts, Washington and Hamilton Districts in the eastern part of the state, and Mero District in what is now middle Tennessee." Washington District court was held at Jonesborough, Hamilton District court was held at Knoxville, and Mero District court was held at Nashville. Nashville was about 200 miles (320 kilometers)—by way of dangerous frontier horse paths and wagon roads—from Jonesborough and Knoxville. He oversaw some cases involving enslaved Blacks but "slave crimes were handled separately in special justices and slaveholders courts," and there was no appeals process that would bring the cases to his bench.

Jackson was initially seated under a recess appointment made in August 1798 by Sevier, and then he served the September term in Hamilton District and the November term at Mero District. Jackson was officially elected by vote of the Tennessee state legislature in December 1798, defeating Bennett Searcy, 18 to 13. Other historically significant figures who had the same judge job before or after Jackson included McNairy, Overton, Willie Blount, and Archibald Roane.

The three judges met twice a year in each of the three judicial districts for 12 to 15 days at a time. Day one was administrative and bureaucratic business followed by county justices of the peace and sheriffs submitting "return of recognizances, scire facias, and other writs. Constables were summoned and a grand jury impanelled." The judge work included overseeing trials, hearing motions, and deciding on appeals. The cases were mostly commercial litigation. Jackson "often presided over three or four jury deliberations daily, and during one hectic day he sat on seven trials." Criminal complaints were a comparatively small fraction of the docket, with few serious felonies, the most common charges were for assault, stealing horses, and "riot".

Punishments were stern, for instance, Jackson joined in "rendering the death penalty on at least ten occasions...in May of 1802, Jackson handed down three capital sentences for horse stealing at a single term." In October 1799, the Tennessee General Assembly made horse theft a death penalty crime; prior to that the penalty had been 39 lashes "well laid on," "both of ears nailed to the Pillory and cut off," and facial branding, H on one cheek, and T on the other. According to the memoirs of Jane Thomas, who arrived in Nashville as a child in 1804, "On the Square there was a stone courthouse and a whipping-post, a stone church, a stone jail house. Whenever a man stole a horse, or anything worth over $30, he had his ears clipped at the ends. For smaller crimes he was tied to the whipping-post, his shirt was taken off, and he was given 39 lashes with a cowhide." (Note: The 39 lashes are the number of times Jesus was whipped during the flagellation of Christ, which was derived from the Old Testament Deuteronomic Code, which in Deuteronomy 25:1–3 limits punishments to no more than 40 strikes.)

Courthouse at Jonesborough, Washington County, Tennessee, constructed 1784

Per James Ely, one of the editors of The Legal Papers of Andrew Jackson, "It is difficult to probe the intellectual dimension of Jackson's years on the bench...Decisions were delivered seriatim by the individual judges. Although Jackson was prepared to exercise an independent judgment and to disagree with his colleagues, his opinions were brief and lacked extensive citation to legal authorities." Jackson had several extended absences and missed several sessions of court in 1803 and 1804, in two instances because he was traveling to Philadelphia to buy goods for resale at his stores. He began to contemplate resigning from the bench as early as 1801. In the telling of Ely, "Jackson's restless nature was not suited for the inevitable constraints upon a judge." The money was also no good, about which Jackson complained. (When Jackson sold Betty and her 15-year-old daughter Hannah to Abraham Green in Pickering County, Mississippi Territory on December 27, 1800, the sale price of $550 for the pair was almost equivalent to Jackson's $600 annual salary as a Tennessee state judge.) Jackson resigned from the bench on July 24, 1804, apparently for a multitude of reasons, including that being a state judge conflicted, since February 1802, with his elected office of major general of Tennessee militia. Sevier, for his part, had apparently come to regret the appointment: In 1803, Sevier journaled about a dream in which his dying father visited from heaven to share that everyone there was fascinated by the Jackson–Sevier abortive duel incident but also that "Jackson was by all viewed as a very wicked base man and a very improper person for a Judge."

== Land speculation ==
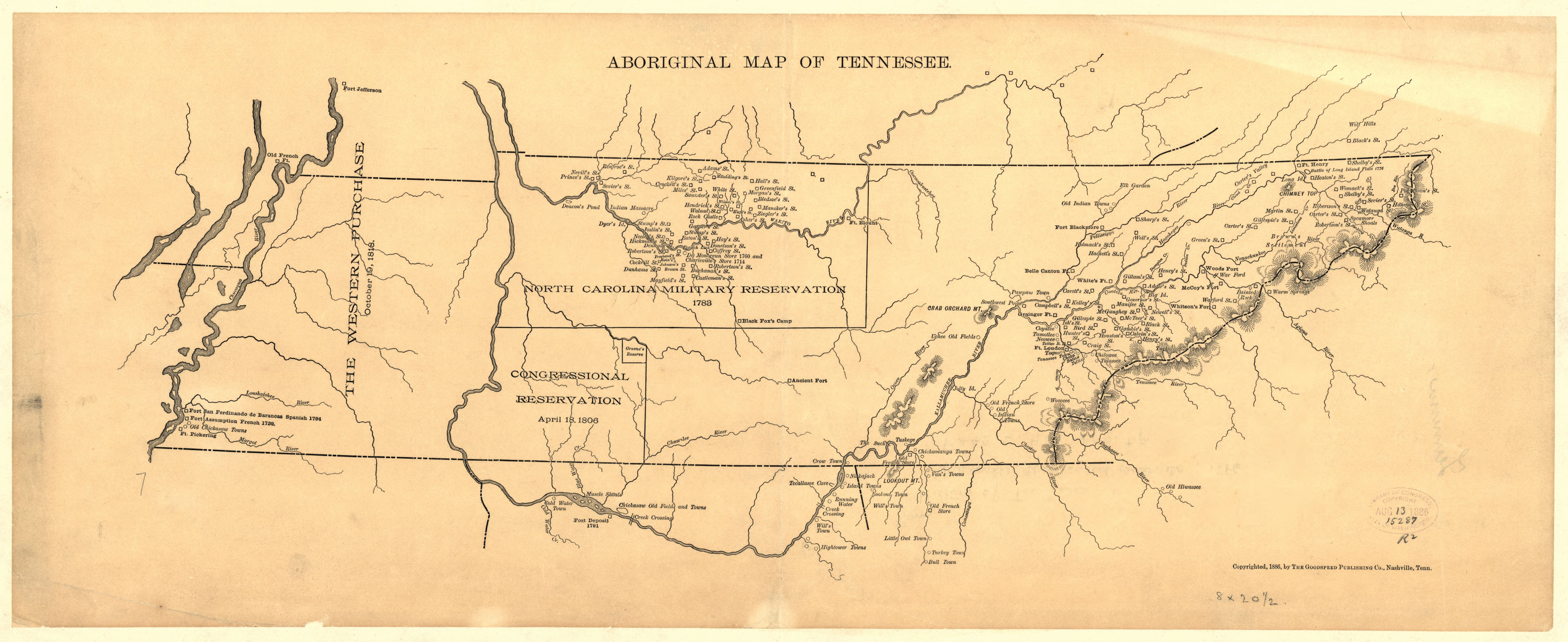
Aboriginal map of Tennessee showing the North Carolina Military Reservation, site of land grants to Continental Army veterans in lieu of cash payment for services; recipients could settle the land or resell the warrants to speculators

According to biographer Robert V. Remini, Jackson's engagement with real estate investment started early in his life and continued "almost to the moment of his death," although historians have no clear insight into how profitable it was for him or even the full extent of his involvement. It was the combination of slave ownership and land speculation that "marked his entry into the planter class," elevating him above his roots as a fatherless runabout of the Carolina backcountry. Owning 20 slaves was the "traditional dividing line" between someone being considered a farmer and someone being considered a planter.

== Slave trading ==
Signing an oath of allegiance to his Catholic majesty, the king of Spain, Carlos IV, on July 15, 1789, allowed Jackson trading privileges and tax benefits in the Spanish-controlled Natchez District

In the telling of historian Whitney Snow, Jackson's employment income as an attorney was unpredictable, and insufficient to cover his financial losses, so he "began dabbling in mercantilism, land speculation, and the interstate slave trade" and found that of the three, "slave trading not only relieved Jackson of debt but also allowed him to accumulate a larger-than-average work force of slave labor, a sure sign of status at the time." Jackson carried slaves from the eastern states by land and water to middle Tennessee and then down the rivers by flatboat to the confluence of Bayou Pierre and the Mississippi River and there sold them to the planters of what are now Claiborne, Jefferson, and Adams counties, Mississippi. He sometimes ventured further south to sell to planters near Baton Rouge and Bayou Sara in the Feliciana section of Louisiana, and to brokers at New Orleans, but he reportedly preferred to sell in Mississippi because Louisiana's redhibition laws (which were essentially state-mandated slave warranties) complicated his trading.

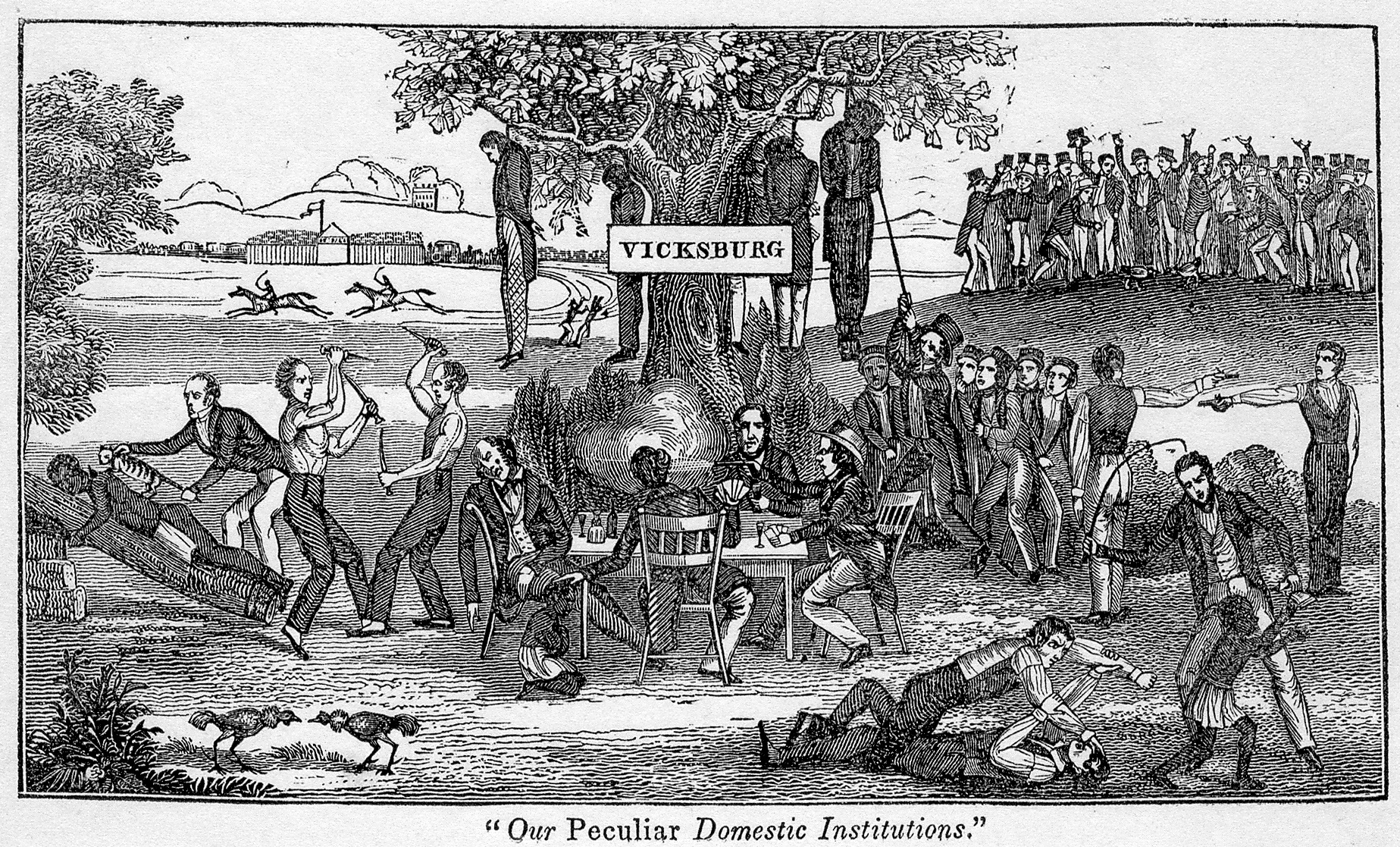
Several of Jackson's hobbies are depicted in this American Anti-Slavery Almanac woodcut illustrating the hanging of the gamblers at Vicksburg in 1835

Jackson's mercantile enterprises and gaming operations appear to have been entangled with his slave trading, real estate speculation, and his imperial designs on Indigenous lands, which was the case throughout pioneer-era Tennessee, whose politicians, militia officers, and "land-grabbers" were men whose "classifications...greatly overlapped." As a merchant, Jackson bought and sold as the market demanded, and as explained by researcher Bill Carey, "In the early 1800s, Tennessee's retail world had not advanced to the point where there were separate grocery, drug, and furniture stores. Customers bought all types of products from auctioneers, who might have furniture one week, blankets the next, and slaves the third." As Nashville historian Anita S. Goodstein put it, "Land speculators, merchants, self-made lawyers—all dealt in slaves. Indeed they used slaves almost as currency." It was common to treat slaves as a cash equivalent: as debt collateral, by mortgaging them, or by staking them on the turn of a faro game. (One of Jackson's friends from North Carolina was even accused of buying his way into a judicial clerkship with "the present docket profits and three negroes.") Slaves were "liquid assets" that served as a ready currency for land owners with unreliable income. The financial system of the frontier U.S. south was based on the inherent fundamental value of the enslaved, all while guaranteeing a lifetime of insecurity for the people used as security. An example of the use of slaves to repay debts is Stockley Donelson's 1791 offer to pay off Jackson with "one likely Country born Negro boy or girl." In 1819, Overton asked Jackson to have John Brahan, of Huntsville, Alabama Territory, repay him for a debt of approximately $800 in "one or two likely healthy boys of 12 or 13 years of age at such price as you may think they are worth in Cash, and as you would trade for yourself." According to Goodstein's analysis of 452 Nashville-area transactions involving approximately 700 enslaved persons in the period from 1783 to 1804, "The overwhelming number of sales were of a single slave, man or woman or child. Of the 452 transactions only 116 involved transfers of more than one slave...Almost half of those for whom we have age data were under 16. It was not uncommon for children to be sold separately, away from parents or friends. Witness Aron, age six, sold to Andrew Jackson in 1791." (Note: Jackson paid £100 to buy Aron from George Augustus Sugg on December 21, 1791.) (Note: The United States dollar was created on April 2, 1792 when the United States Congress passed the Mint Act.)

== Distillery and saloons ==
1824 advertisement for whiskey stills, Knoxville Enquirer, Tennessee

Letters and tax records show Jackson sold whiskey from stills running at his property, capacity 197 U.S. gal (750 L), later reduced to 139 U.S. gal (530 L). He wrote to customers, "The whiskey you can have at any time in such quantities as you may think proper," and customers like G. M. Deaderick wrote Jackson with specific requests: "Should you not have made the whole of the Whiskey you intend for me, would be very thankfull to have one Barrel of at least one third Rye." Jackson's winter 1803 distillery record concludes, "Whiskey made, 370 gallons Sent to Store." In 1922, S. G. Heiskell described Jackson's Mississippi business as "slaves and whiskey."

Jackson had saloons. According to the county historian for Warren County, Ohio, a local plow manufacturer called John E. Dey travelled widely in the early 19th century via the Mississippi and Ohio River, seeking customers for the company's products. Dey spent his winters at Bruinsburg, Mississippi, and "Andrew Jackson, years before when he was just a Colonel, lived at this place. Colonel Jackson quite often frequented the plantation, and Mr. Dey became well acquainted with him. He remembered that he was a tall, slim man, with a nervous manner. He used to carry a pocket full of shelled corn and play with the grains at the dining table...He says that Colonel Jackson, soon after he came to Mississippi, went back into the woods about four miles from the river to a noted hunting place of the hunting gentlemen of the country. Here he started a saloon which he continued for many years. He never appeared behind the bar, but the establishment was his and he was responsible for it." On August 19, 1806, Cage & Black made a rental agreement with Andrew Jackson and James S. Rawlings for a house, lot, and stables in Gallatin, Tennessee. Rawlings was married to a niece of Rachel Jackson. On September 13, 1806, Rawlings advertised that he had opened a tavern in Gallatin that offered "a well-chosen assortment of imported spirits and wines."

== Boats and freighting ==
1957 Leonard Everett Fisher illustration of a possibly fantastical paddlewheel-propelled double-flatboat

Jackson was a river boatman and sold boats to other travelers. The Clover Bottom was where Jackson's company sold and launched flatboats for other travelers going downriver. Historian Michael Allen places American boatmen of "the western waters" in several classes (agent boatmen, common boatmen, farmer flatboatmen, flatboatmen, keelboatmen, merchant navigators, raftsmen) and categorizes Jackson as a merchant navigator. Allen describes a merchant navigator as the "least romantic" class of boatmen, for the merchant navigators were businessmen "unwilling to entrust their cargoes and fortunes to a professional agent boatman, and elected to become professional river men themselves. Other notable merchant navigators besides Jackson include Moses and Stephen F. Austin, James Wilkinson, Nathaniel Massie, Thomas Teas, and Phillip Buckner.

=== Flatboats, keelboats, and river boatmen ===
American river flatboats had no mechanical propulsion, were barely steered, were most useful in winter and spring when rains kept the rivers high, and went only downstream, never up. They were constructed "bottom side up, at improvised docks on the river bank...Upon completion of the hull, the boats were launched by turning them over into the river." A flatboat was, as described by Donald Davidson, author of a two-volume history of the Tennessee River:

...[a] broad-bottomed, boxlike structure, perhaps with a little rake at the bow. It was steered by a board fastened to a long pole, and was steadied in the current by clumsy, oarlike sweeps on each side, called 'broadhorns'. It was built of green timber sawed from the forest near the stream and put together with wooden pins...The roof might be gabled or round; one early observer described it as being 'like the roof of a carriage'. It covered at least half, or as much as two-thirds, of the boat. The larger flatboats measured up to 20 ft (6.1 m) by 100 ft (30 m) and could carry heavy loads—300 to 400 bales of cotton. The crudest possible type would be a mere log raft, with a shelter of rough boards, but the better boats might be fancied up considerably, with a pump to take care of leakage, and a brick or stone fireplace with a chimney, for cooking and good cheer.

Some flatboats seem to have had sails, which are rarely mentioned in written accounts but are visible in some "illustrations drawn by artists of the day." According to the record books of an 1810s mercantile and shipping business based at the Boatyard (Christianville) near the Long Island of the Tennessee, "Flatboats were normally priced according to length, at 6 shillings (or one dollar) per foot," and "had a steersman and two or three rowmen. Rowmen were paid about two-thirds as much as the steersman." Keelboats were twice the price of a flatboat at $2 per foot.

Generally speaking, wrote historian Richard E. Oglesby in 1970, although romanticized in popular culture with tales of Mike Fink and the legend of the alligator-horse, "The boatmen of the western waters had a strong reputation for lawlessness, but they had come by it honestly." The pledge to the king of Spain in pre-territorial days was a common perjury that often later birthed more troubled children (extortion, piracy, larceny, fraud), "so the boatmen, at least some of them, were unprincipled sharpers, and their brand of lawlessness," nurtured in the ordinaries of Natchez-Under-the-Hill and red-light districts like the Swamp surrounding Girod Street at New Orleans, "does not seem to fit into the categories of practical jokes, exuberant spirits, or an excess of democratic zeal. It was just common criminality. Historian Leland D. Baldwin, writing in 1941, defended the boatmen against these charges, arguing that, "The desire for further business was an incentive toward honesty in conducing their cargoes...whatever their crimes, they retained a certain degree of trustworthiness." Boatmen often lashed their craft together for safety in numbers and so "visiting and bargaining among crews could be carried on conveniently, and frolics and dances were held. Timothy Flint tells of traversing a fleet of eight boats at one time. On one the men were killing hogs; another was laden with apples, cider, nuts, and fruits; a third was a dram shop."

=== Jackson's operations ===
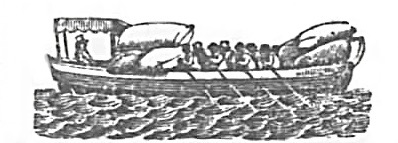
Woodcut etching of a Tennessee River cotton boat, 1829

There is a surviving 1803 contract between a riverman and Jackson's partner John Coffee arranging for a flatboat to depart from Haysborough, Tennessee for New Orleans loaded with 25 cotton bales and 77 hogs, which offers some sense of the scale of Jackson's shipments. In 1803 his firm built 27 boats "for the war department in expectation of difficulty with Spain in Louisiana." One of these boats, 12 ft (3.7 m) across the beam and 45 ft (14 m) long, and apparently never used for its commissioned purpose, was sold to Williamson County merchant John Hardeman on February 23, 1804, for US$45 (equivalent to $967.5 in 2025). Jackson's account books show that in June 1804 "it took his 13 hands 16 days and '20 gallons of whiskey' to travel from Nashville to the mouth of the Cumberland and back."

In the course of the 1806–07 expedition that came to be known as the Burr conspiracy, Aaron Burr ordered five of Jackson's boats (construction of which was probably supervised by John Coffee), picked up two that were ready at Clover Bottom, and set off for the south from Jackson's landing at Stones River, weeks later surrendering himself to authorities at Peter Bruin's house at Bruinsburg. These boats were themselves valuable in the lower Mississippi, which had a shortage of planed lumber; they could be deconstructed and recycled into buildings and raised sidewalks.

Jackson's brother-in-law John Caffery moved his family to the lower Mississippi River valley in 1800 to serve as an "agent" for Jackson's business, offering in newspaper ads to "freight produce to New Orleans and act on his customers' behalf in selling their goods in New Orleans in exchange for 'five per cent on the [sale]'." In October 1800, Caffrey advertised that he would soon "descend the river to New Orleans" in boats that were being constructed at Lancaster's saw-mill at the confluence of Caney Fork and the Cumberland River near present-day Carthage, Tennessee. In 1936 a descendant wrote, "Their home was in Natchez, Miss., where John Caffery was engaged in the mercantile business, in the employ of Andrew Jackson."

As Jackson moved into Muscle Shoals section of the Tennessee River valley in the 1810s and early 1820s, he may well have been involved in freighting there as well. He knew Tennessee River boatmen Malcolm Gilchrist, Isaac Brownlow, and the Meltons. In 1819 Jackson recorded payments made by travelers for the use of a boat to navigate from Melton's Bluff (where he had a plantation) "to mouth of Cypress".

== Salt ==
Buffalo (Bison bison) from The vivaparous quadrupeds of North America by John James Audubon and John Woodhouse Audubon

Jackson had an apparent fascination with commodity salt and at the turn of the 19th century "made serious efforts to become involved in salt mining." Salt resources of the era "commonly took the form of mineral-rich mud or saline springs," which attracted deer and buffalo, and then the Indigenous, and eventually pioneering Whites. Control of these resources was often a point of contention between settlers and Indians. Salt extraction required channeling and boiling down the spring water. This work was mostly conducted by tribal women and enslaved Blacks, who tended open fires and later industrial furnaces.

In 1802 Jackson wrote to Thomas Jefferson, concerned about "Alate attempt at a monopoly of Salt in this Western Country," specifically a salt lick located "within the Indian boundary" in the vicinity of the Wabash River. In the same letter he mentioned a salt resource near "The Ferry at South west Point which brings to the Indians a handsome anual Stipend." In 1803 he sent John Coffee to examine the Illinois Salines. In 1806 he corresponded with Albert Gallatin about salt lands in Indiana Territory.

Jackson was later U.S. negotiator for a treaty with the Chickasaw, a section of which was the cause of the salt lick reserve controversy. In the 1830s, Jackson's old friend and U.S. Senate ally Thomas Hart Benton agitated against domestic salt cartels (e.g. Kanawha salines) that Benton believed were profiteering on domestic salt under tariffs that protected them against foreign competitors.

== See also ==
- Robards–Donelson–Jackson relationship controversy
- Donelson family
- List of violent incidents involving Andrew Jackson
- Legal affairs of Andrew Jackson
- Bibliography of Andrew Jackson
- Carlisle Barracks § 1756–1860
- History of Pittsburgh § Gateway to the West (1763–1799)
- History of slavery in Pennsylvania
- Fighting Butlers
- History of Natchez, Mississippi
- Natchez Trace
- Natchez nabob
- Scotch settlement (Mississippi) § Jefferson County
- Early life and career of Thomas Jefferson
- Early life and career of Abraham Lincoln
- Early life and career of Ulysses S. Grant

== Sources ==
- Abernethy, Thomas Perkins (October 1927). "Andrew Jackson and the Rise of South-Western Democracy". The American Historical Review. 33 (1). American Historical Association. Oxford University Press: 64–77. doi:10.2307/1838111. ISSN 0002-8762. JSTOR 1838111.
- Agee, Phil (September 2022). Debt-Driven Settlerism: Small Farmers and Bankers in the Trans-Appalachian South, 1800–1820 (Thesis). City University of New York (CUNY) Graduate Center.
- Ahern, L. R.; Hunt, R. F. (September 1955). "The Boatyard Store, 1814–1825". Tennessee Historical Quarterly. 14 (3). Tennessee Historical Society: 257–277. ISSN 0040-3261. JSTOR 42621241.
- Allen, Michael (1994) [1990]. Western rivermen, 1763–1861: Ohio and Mississippi boatmen and the myth of the alligator horse (Paperback ed.). Baton Rouge: Louisiana State University Press. ISBN 978-0-8071-1907-5. LCCN 90005860. OCLC 30468725.
- Arnow, Harriette Simpson (December 1960). "The Pioneer Farmer and His Crops in the Cumberland Region". Tennessee Historical Quarterly. XIX (4): 291–327. ISSN 0040-3261. JSTOR 42621803.
- ——— (1961). "Education and The Professions In the Cumberland Region". Tennessee Historical Quarterly. 20 (2). Tennessee Historical Society: 120–158. ISSN 0040-3261. JSTOR 42621528.
- Arthur, John Preston (1914). Western North Carolina: A History from 1730–1913. Raleigh, N.C.: Edwards & Broughton Printing Company. LCCN 87891190. OCLC 475790673. OL 13175978W – via HathiTrust.
- Baldwin, Leland D. (1980) [1941]. The Keelboat Age on Western Waters. Western Pennsylvania Historical Society (Reprint ed.). University of Pittsburgh Press. ISBN 978-0-8229-5319-7. LCCN 41010342.
- Bogan, Dallas R. (1997). Warren County, Ohio and Beyond. Bowie, Maryland: Heritage Books. ISBN 0-7884-0678-7. LCCN 97211841. OCLC 37700686.
- Booraem, Hendrik (2001). Young Hickory: the making of Andrew Jackson. Dallas, Texas: Taylor Trade Publishing. ISBN 978-0-87833-263-2. LCCN 00048820.
- Carey, Bill (2018). Runaways, Coffles and Fancy Girls: A History of Slavery in Tennessee. Nashville, Tennessee: Clearbrook Press. ISBN 978-0-9725680-4-3. LCCN 2018903570. OCLC 1045068878.
- Carson, W. Wallace (June 1920). "Transportation and Traffic on the Ohio and the Mississippi Before the Steamboat". The Mississippi Valley Historical Review. VII (1). Organization of American Historians. Oxford University Press: 26–38. doi:10.2307/1886569. ISSN 0161-391X. JSTOR 1886569. OCLC 1776316.
- Cheathem, Mark R. (2014). Andrew Jackson, Southerner. Baton Rouge, Louisiana: Louisiana State University Press. ISBN 978-0-8071-5099-3. LCCN 2012049695. OCLC 858995561. Project MUSE book 26506.
- Cohen, Kenneth (Winter 2011). "'The Entreaties and Perswasions of our Acquaintance' Gambling and Networks in Early America". Journal of the Early Republic. 31 (4): 599–638. doi:10.1353/jer.2011.0056. ISSN 0275-1275. JSTOR 41261653.
- Cooper, William J. Jr. (2013) [1978]. The South and the Politics of Slavery, 1828–1856 (ebook ed.). Baton Rouge: Louisiana State University Press. ISBN 9780807142653. LCCN 78000751. OCLC 714609691. Project MUSE book 16682.
- Davidson, Donald (1991) [1946]. The Tennessee—Volume One, The Old River: Frontier to Secession. Southern Classics Series. Fitzgerald Rivers of America Collection (Library of Congress). Nashville: J.S. Sanders & Company. ISBN 978-1-879941-01-4.
- DesChamps, Margaret Burr (September 1947). "Early Days in the Cumberland Country". Tennessee Historical Quarterly. VI (3): 195–229. ISSN 0040-3261. JSTOR 42620950.
- Dew, Charles B. (2016). The Making of a Racist: A Southerner Reflects on Family, History, and the Slave Trade. Charlottesville, Virginia: University of Virginia Press. ISBN 978-0-8139-3888-2. LCCN 2015043815. OCLC 956713856.
- Drew, Bettina Lee (December 2001). Master Andrew Jackson: Indian Removal and the Culture of Slavery (Thesis). Yale University. UMI 3030759. ProQuest 3030759.
- Ely, James W. (Winter 1979). "The Legal Practice of Andrew Jackson". Tennessee Historical Quarterly. 38 (4). Tennessee Historical Society: 421–435. ISSN 0040-3261. JSTOR 42626016.
- ——— (Summer 1981). "Andrew Jackson as Tennessee State Court Judge, 1798–1804". Tennessee Historical Quarterly. 40 (2). Tennessee Historical Society: 144–157. ISSN 0040-3261. JSTOR 42626180.
- ———; Brown, Theodore Jr., eds. (1987). Legal Papers of Andrew Jackson. Supplement to the Papers of Andrew Jackson. Knoxville, Tennessee: University of Tennessee Press. ISBN 978-0-87049-355-3. LCCN 82002635. OCLC 17590211.
- Farrell, W. E. (2007). "Andrew Jackson 7th President of the United States and the Jacksons of Ballybay 1803–1824". Clogher Record. 19 (2/3): 202–238. doi:10.2307/27699566. JSTOR 27699566.
- Goodstein, Anita Shafer (1989). Nashville, 1780–1860: From Frontier to City. Gainesville, Florida: University of Florida Press. ISBN 978-0-8130-0940-7. LCCN 89033186. OCLC 19669897.
- Hardeman, Nicholas Perkins (1977). Wilderness Calling: The Hardeman Family in the American Westward Movement, 1750–1900. Knoxville, Tennessee: University of Tennessee Press. ISBN 978-0-87049-194-8. LCCN 76000980. OCLC 2005980 – via Internet Archive.
- Horecny, Elisabeth (October 2024). From Colonial Frontier to a Slave Society: 'Second Slavery' and the Former Backcountry of South Carolina in the Early Republic, 1780–1833 (Ph.D History). University of South Carolina.
- Hsiung, David C. (1991). "The Social World of Middle Tennessee, 1780–1840". In Holden, Robert J. (ed.). Selected Papers from the 1989 and 1990 George Rogers Clark Trans-Appalachian Frontier History Conferences (Online [2011] ed.). Vincennes, Indiana: U.S. National Park Service and Vincennes University. OCLC 28524305.
- Jackson, Andrew (1980). Smith, Sam; Owsley, Harriet (eds.). The Papers of Andrew Jackson: Volume I, 1770–1803. University of Tennessee Press. doi:10.7290/utp7943. ISBN 978-0-87049-219-8.
- ——— (1984). Moser, Harold; Macpherson, Sharon (eds.). The Papers of Andrew Jackson, Volume II, 1804–1813. University of Tennessee Press. doi:10.7290/utp3038. ISBN 978-0-87049-441-3.
- ——— (1994). Moser, Harold; Hoth, David; Hoemann, George (eds.). The Papers of Andrew Jackson: Volume IV, 1816–1820. University of Tennessee Press. doi:10.7290/utp8684. ISBN 978-0-87049-778-0.
- Kegley, Tracy M. (March 1948). "James White Stephenson: Teacher of Andrew Jackson". Tennessee Historical Quarterly. 7 (1): 38–51. ISSN 0040-3261. JSTOR 42620965.
- Kinard, Margaret (March 1949). "Frontier Development of Williamson County". Tennessee Historical Quarterly. VIII (1): 3–33. ISSN 0040-3261. JSTOR 42620999.
- Libby, David J. (2004). Slavery and Frontier Mississippi, 1720–1835. Jackson: University Press of Mississippi. ISBN 978-1-4237-3209-9. LCCN 2003010748. OCLC 62257672.
- Oglesby, Richard E. (1970). "The Western Boatman: Half Horse, Half Myth". In McDermott, John Francis (ed.). Travelers on the western frontier. Southern Illinois University at Edwardsville. Urbana: University of Illinois Press. pp. 252–266. ISBN 978-0-252-00088-1. LCCN 77100375.
- Parton, James (1861a). Life of Andrew Jackson. Vol. I. New York: Mason Brothers. LCCN 11016613. OCLC 864685. OL 14020167M. This article incorporates text from this source, which is in the public domain.
- Perry, B. F. (1859). "William Smith". In O'Neall, John B. (ed.). Biographical Sketches of the Bench and Bar of South Carolina. Vol. I. Greenville, Sept. 3d, 1858. Charleston, South Carolina: S.G. Courtenay & Co. pp. 106–120. LCCN 05041669. OCLC 3312491. IA biographicalsket01onea_0.
- Pessen, Edward (1985) [1969]. Jacksonian America: Society, Personality, and Politics (Rev. ed.). Urbana, Illinois: University of Illinois Press. ISBN 978-0-252-01237-2. LCCN 85001100. OCLC 11783430.
- Pratt, Julius W. (October 1945). "Aaron Burr and the Historians". New York History. 26 (4). Fenimore Art Museum. Cornell University Press: 447–470. ISSN 0146-437X. JSTOR 23149934.
- Remini, Robert V. (1977). Andrew Jackson and the Course of American Empire, 1767–1821. New York, NY: Harper & Row Publishers, Inc. ISBN 978-0-8018-5912-0. OCLC 1145801830.
- Ross, Harvey Lee (1899). The Early Pioneers and Pioneer Events of the State of Illinois Including Personal Recollections of the Writer of Abraham Lincoln, Andrew Jackson and Peter Cartwright, Together With a Brief Autobiography of the Writer. Chicago: Eastman Brothers. LCCN 09030102. OCLC 181327605. OL 7013514M – via HathiTrust.
- Snow, Whitney Adrienne (2008). "Slave Owner, Slave Trader, Gentleman: Slavery and the Rise of Andrew Jackson" (PDF). Journal of East Tennessee History. 80. Knoxville, Tennessee: East Tennessee Historical Society: 47–59. ISSN 1058-2126. OCLC 23044540.
- Skeen, C. Edward (1988). "The Legal Papers of Andrew Jackson Ed. by James W. Ely Jr. and Theodore Brown Jr". Book Reviews. West Tennessee Historical Society Papers. XLII. Memphis, Tennessee: 66–67. ISSN 0361-6215. OCLC 1769643.
- Sparks, W. H. (1870). The Memories of Fifty Years: Containing Brief Biographical Notes of Distinguished Americans and Anecdotes of Remarkable Men. Philadelphia: Claxton, Remsen & Haffelfinger. hdl:loc.gdc/scd0001.00100906478. LCCN 06005624. OCLC 1048818176. OL 23365380M – via HathiTrust, copy digitized by Library of Congress.
- Spence, Richard Douglas (2010). "Samuel Donelson: Young Andrew Jackson's Best Friend". Tennessee Historical Quarterly. 69 (2). Tennessee Historical Society: 106–123. ISSN 0040-3261. JSTOR 42628170.
- Stearns, Susan Gaunt (2024). "7. Cotton and the Americanization of Natchez". Empire of Commerce: The Closing of the Mississippi and the Opening of Atlantic Trade. Jeffersonian America. Charlottesville, Virginia: University of Virginia Press. doi:10.2307/jj.13840496. ISBN 978-0-8139-5125-6. JSTOR jj.13840496. LCCN 2023052273. OCLC 1417600570. Project MUSE book 124327.
- Stewart, David O. (2011). American Emperor: Aaron Burr's Challenge to Jefferson's America. New York: Simon and Schuster. ISBN 978-1-4391-6032-9. LCCN 2011002647. OCLC 892924831.
- Sydnor, Charles S. (1933). Slavery in Mississippi. American Historical Association, Carnegie Corporation of New York. New York: D. Appleton-Century Co. LCCN 33033678. OCLC 1968805.
- Syrett, Harold Coffin (1953). Andrew Jackson: his contribution to the American tradition. Makers of the American tradition series. Indianapolis: Bobbs-Merrill. ISBN 978-0-8371-5802-0. LCCN 53008875. OCLC 971703.
- Thomas, Jane Henry (1897). Old Days in Nashville, Tennessee. Nashville, Tennessee: Publishing house Methodist Episcopal church, South, Barbee & Smith, agents. hdl:loc.gdc/scd0001.00146133502. LCCN 08018615. OCLC 4159540. OL 140000W.
- Webb, Gary Alan (Spring 1984). "The Magness Trials" (PDF). Williamson County Historical Journal. 15. Franklin, Tennessee: 21–34. LCCN 86642787. OCLC 14186085.
- Various; Jackson, Andrew (1926). Bassett, John Spencer (ed.). Correspondence of Andrew Jackson, Volume I, to April 30, 1814. Carnegie Institution of Washington Papers of the Historical Research Department No. 371. Baltimore, Maryland: The Lord Baltimore Press. LCCN 26007292. OCLC 2533564 – via HathiTrust. This article incorporates text from this source, which is in the public domain.
- Walker, Arda (1943). "Andrew Jackson; Planter". The East Tennessee Historical Society's Publications. 15: 19–34. ISSN 0361-6193. LCCN 29013045. OCLC 39989616. FHL 1345525.
