= Pessen =

Pessen is a surname. Notable people with the surname include:

- Edward Pessen (1920–1992), American historian
- Eytan Pessen (born 1961), German-Israeli pianist and voice teacher
