= Johnstonville =

Johnstonville may refer to:

- Johnstonville, California
- Johnstonville, Georgia
- Johnstonville, North Carolina

== See also ==
- Johnsonville (disambiguation)
