= Alexander Gray (North Carolina politician) =

American planter and legislator (1768–1864)

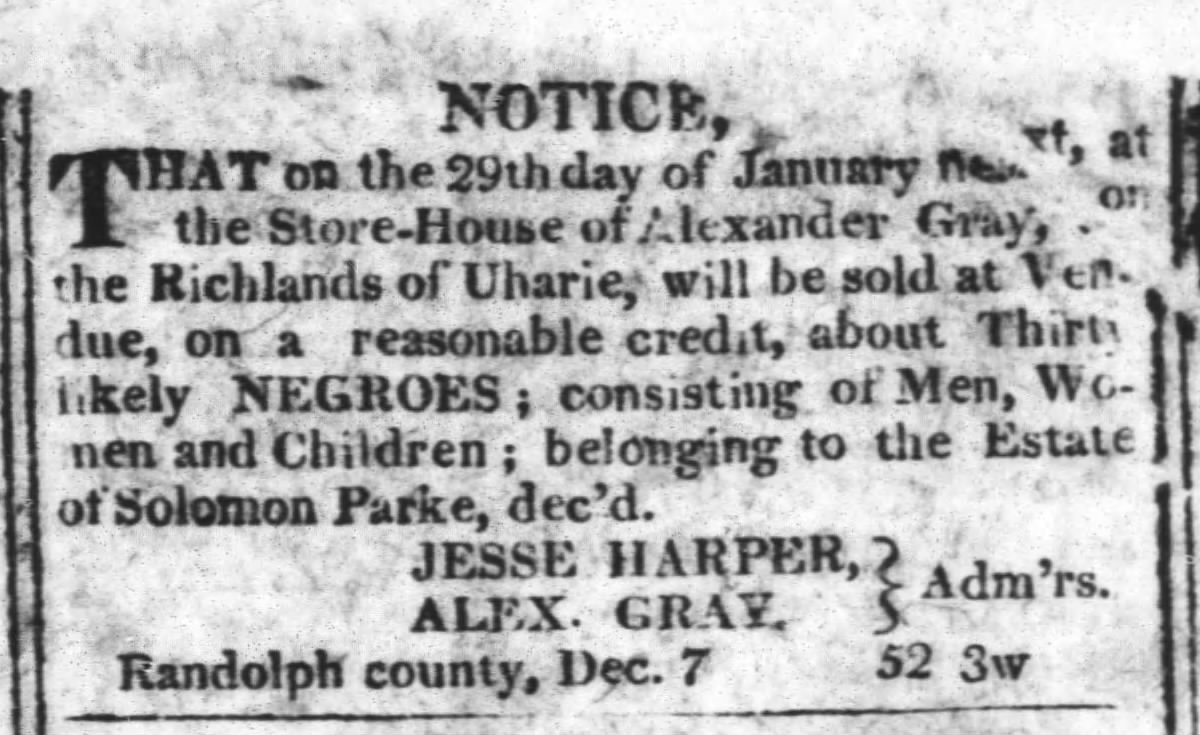
- "NOTICE" Weekly Raleigh Register, December 26, 1817
- Born: August 16, 1768 ?
- Died: July 12, 1864 (aged 95); North Carolina

Alexander Gray (August 16, 1768 – July 12, 1864) was a wealthy planter, North Carolina state legislator, state militia officer, and U.S. Indian agent to the Cherokee. He lived in northwestern quarter of Randolph County, North Carolina, a section known as the "Richlands of the Uwharrie."

== Biography ==
He began working as a merchant and farmer in Randolph County, North Carolina in 1792. In 1793, he was ordered the county court of common pleas to order a set of standard weights and measures from London, for the use of the county government, to be kept at his store in Johnsonville, which was at that time the meeting place of the Randolph county courts. In 1796, the North Carolina Senate appointed him to oversee canals and navigable watercourses in Randolph County. He was first elected to the North Carolina Senate from Randolph County, in 1799. He was elected and served in the North Carolina Senate again from 1804 to 1807. He was elected and served again in 1812. He was elected and served in 1823. He was elected and served again from 1826 to 1828.

He was called Gen. Gray because he was appointed a brigadier general of the North Carolina state militia, beginning in 1810 when the legislature named him head of the sixth brigade of the third division. He was a candidate for the U.S. Congress in 1813 from the district encompassing Randolph County. In 1815, he attempted to muster a brigade at Wadesboro, North Carolina, but notice soon came that the War of 1812 had concluded, under the terms of the Treaty of Ghent. Andrew Erwin of Buncombe County was appointed colonel of Gray's planned brigade.

Gray served a presidential elector for North Carolina in 1816 and 1820. His wife Nancy, mother of a daughter, died at age 38 in 1820.

In 1827, he was appointed, in company with John Cocke of Tennessee and George Lee Davidson of Iredell County to treat with the Cherokee regarding "the cession of all their lands in North Carolina, and so much in Tennessee as will be necessary for facilitating the cutting of a Canal between the Hiwassee and Canasaga rivers." In 1828, on his authority as Indian agent to the Cherokee he reported:

"...the population of the Cherokee Nation in North Carolina is 15,560. There are 147 white men married to Cherokee women, and 68 Cherokee men married to white women. There are 18 Schools in the Nation, and 314 scholars of both sexes; 36 grist mills, 13 saw mills, 762 looms, 2486 spinning wheels, 172 wagons, 2923 ploughs, 7,683 horses, 22,551 black cattle, 16,932 swine, 2,566 sheep, 180 goats, 62 blacksmith shops, 9 stores, 2 tan yards; besides many other items not enumerated. There are likewise several public roads, ferries, and turnpikes in the nation."

Circa 1839 he was reported to be an opponent of Andrew Jackson's presidential administration.

At the time of his death in 1864, he owned over 1300 acres of land and 120 slaves. He was buried in a family cemetery, known as Gen. Gray's Cemetery, in what is now a wooded area near Asheboro, North Carolina.

Local historians have examined claims that he may have been an American interstate slave trader. Gray himself attempted to document some of the local history of the American Revolutionary War. His son Julius A. Gray became a banker who worked for the Confederate States Treasury Department during the American Civil War.

== See also ==
- List of North Carolina slave traders
- Uwharrie Mountains
- Uwharrie River
- David Fanning (loyalist)
