= Williams Chapel =

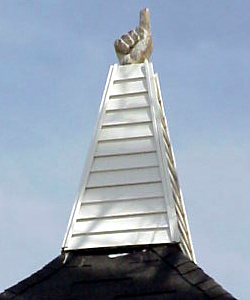
- The steeple
- Williams Chapel
- 40.228538°N 87.486234°W
- Location: Johnsonville, Indiana
- Country: United States
- Denomination: Non-denominational

History
- Founded: 1966

Williams Chapel is a small non-denominational Christian church in the village of Johnsonville in Warren County, Indiana. It is distinctive for the carved wooden hand pointing skyward from its steeple and for its handmade stained glass windows.

The church was built in 1966 by local minister Rev. Grover C. Williams Jr. with help from many others in the community. His wife, Rev. Mildred A. Williams, was the chapel's minister and pastor from its founding in 1966 until her death in 2005, with the exception of seven years in the 1980s when Glenn Wesley of Attica led the congregation. The hand on the steeple was made by Grover Williams at the time the church was built, and was inspired by the steeple of the First Presbyterian Church in Port Gibson, Mississippi. The stained glass windows were made by Mildred Williams in the 1980s.

== Gallery ==
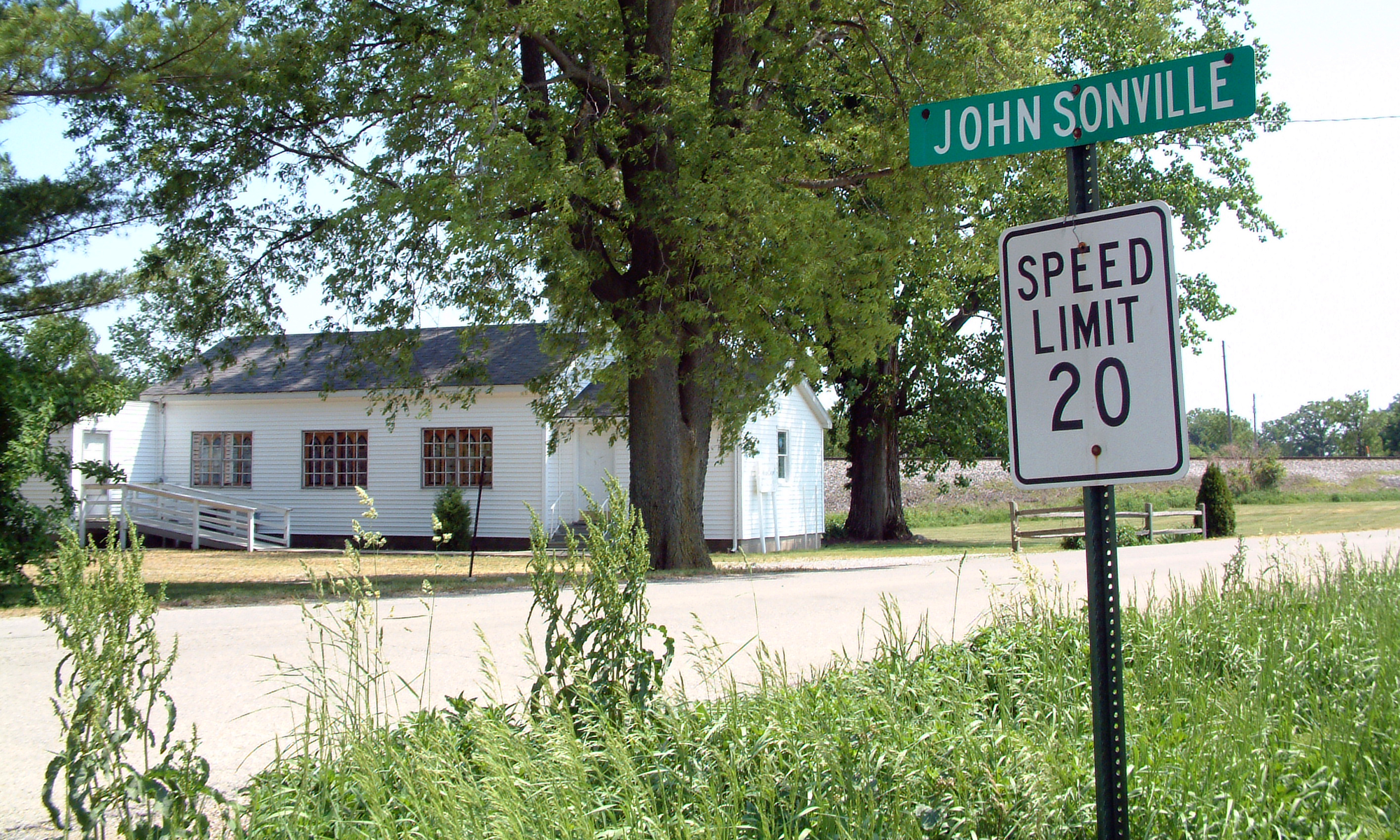
Looking southeast toward the chapel

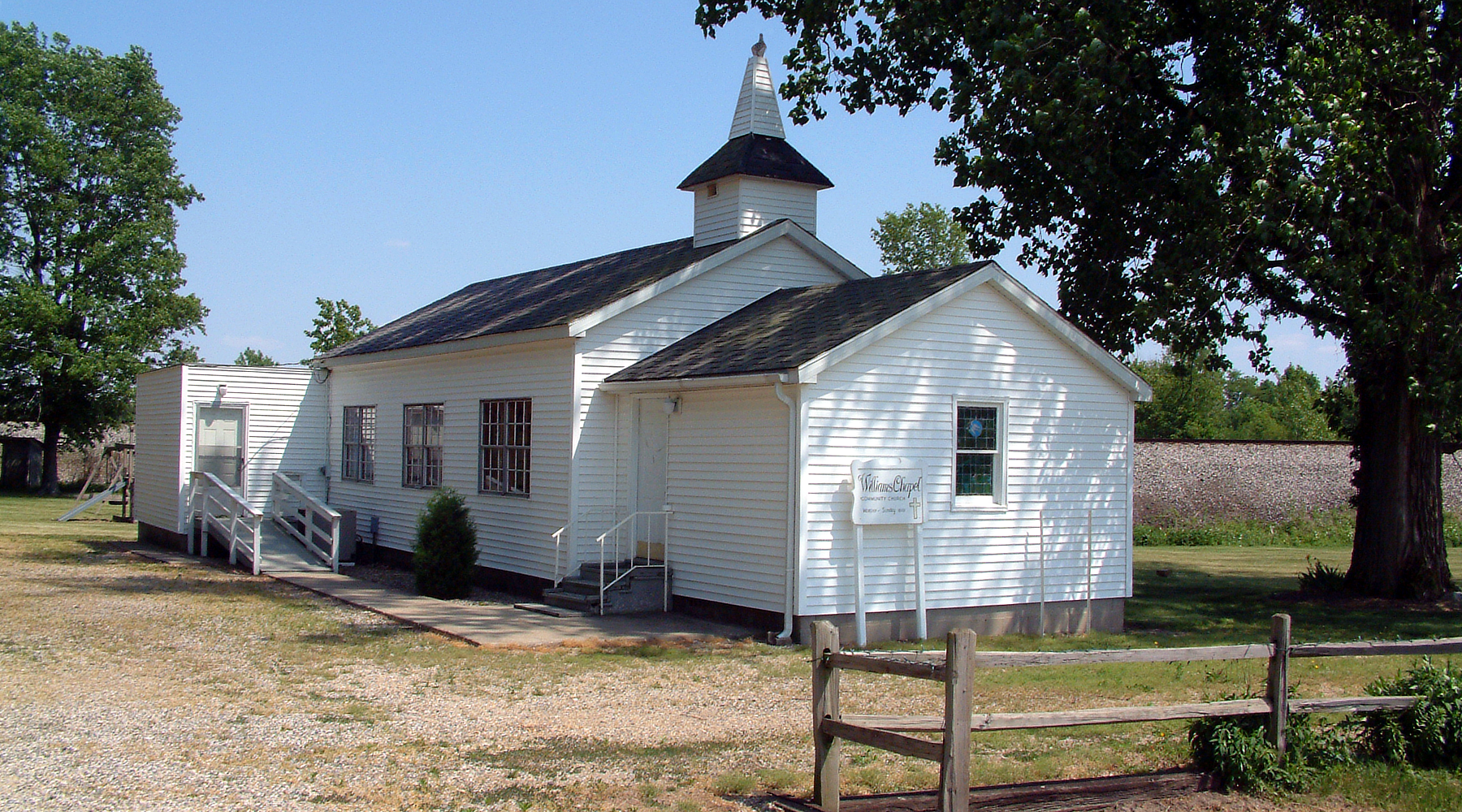
The chapel from the west
