= Chicago, Danville and Vincennes Railroad (Indiana Division) =

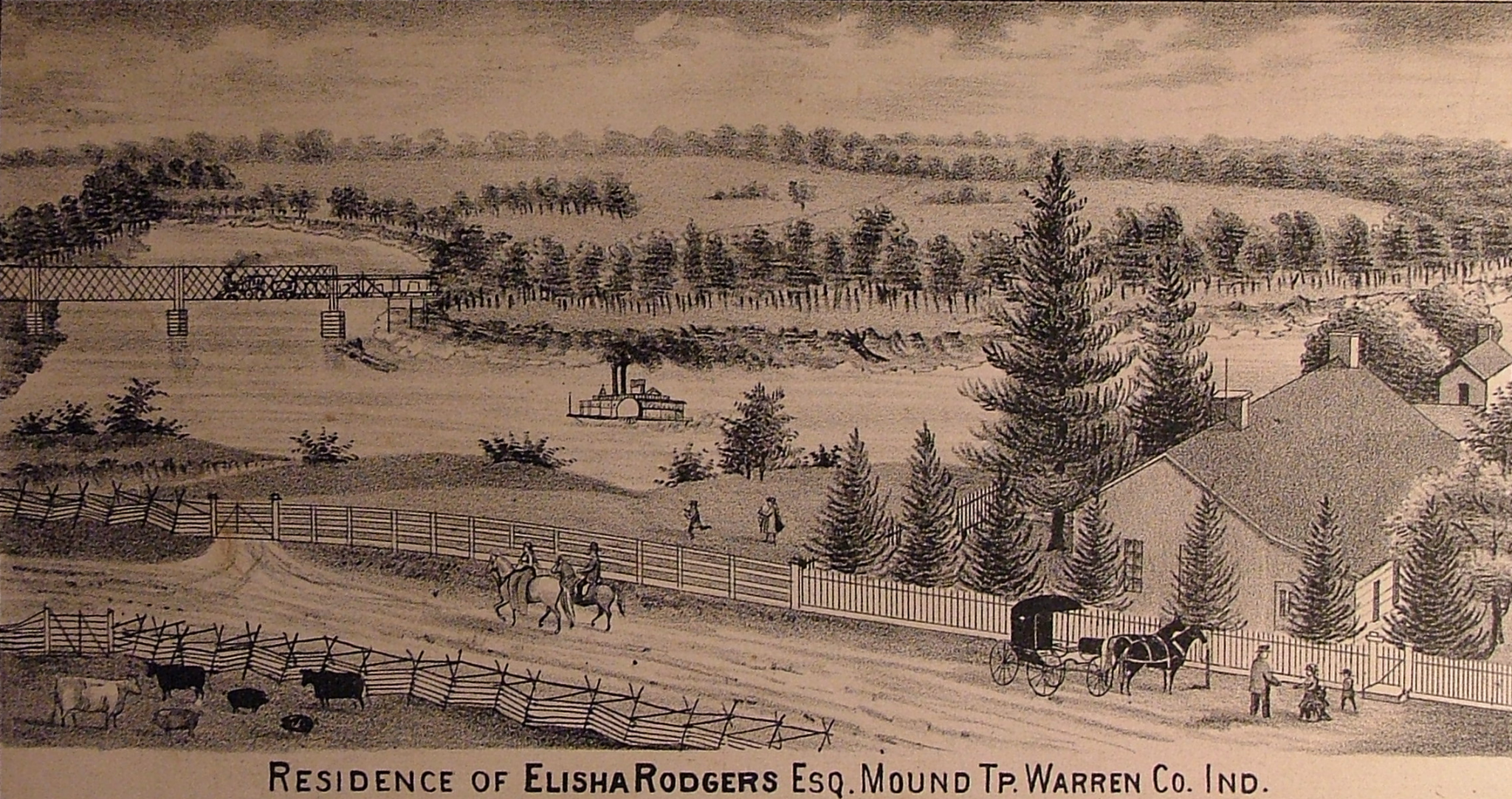
- Drawing from the 1877 Warren County atlas, looking northeast from Baltimore across the Wabash River, with the Pumpkin Vine bridge and train in the background

Overview
- Headquarters: Chicago
- Locale: Eastern Illinois and western Indiana (Bismarck, Johnsonville, Covington, Stringtown)
- Dates of operation: 1873–1879
- Successor: Chicago and Eastern Illinois Railroad

Technical
- Length: 25 miles (40 km)

The Indiana Division or Coal Branch of the Chicago, Danville and Vincennes Railroad (also known as the Pumpkin Vine Railroad) carried coal from mines south of Covington, Indiana, in the 1870s.

== Construction and operation ==
The branch began at Bismarck in Vermilion County, Illinois, and ran southeast across neighboring Warren County, Indiana. It crossed the Wabash River near the river town of Baltimore, then continued southeast to Covington in Fountain County, and then a few miles further south to the coal mines near Snoddy's Mill in the Coal Creek area. These mines were operated by Phelps and Company, and by McClelland and Company. The area was known as Stringtown because it consisted of a series of small settlements; this name is still used locally. Construction began in the second week of June 1872. By August, the portion that ran from the mines north to Covington was completed. The remainder was finished by July 1873.

The line covered a total distance of about 25 miles (40 km) and transported coal for several years in the 1870s. Two trains ran to and from the mines each day. The trip from Bismarck to the coal mines took about 2 hours and 15 minutes, making the average speed about 5.5 miles per hour (8.9 km/h); there were four stations along the way, including Sumner (Johnsonville), Taylor (or Taylor's Switch), a gravel pit, and Covington.

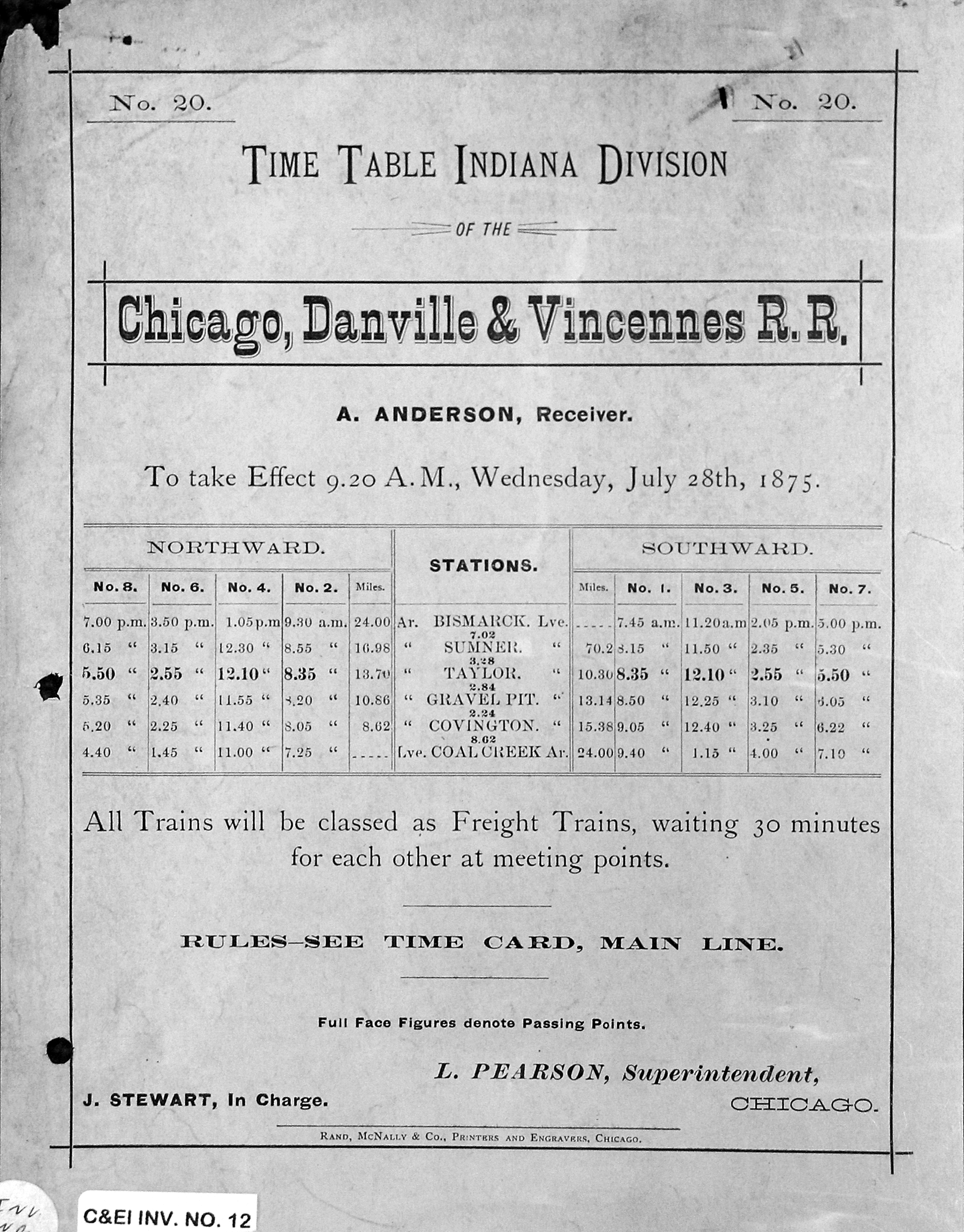
1875 timetable

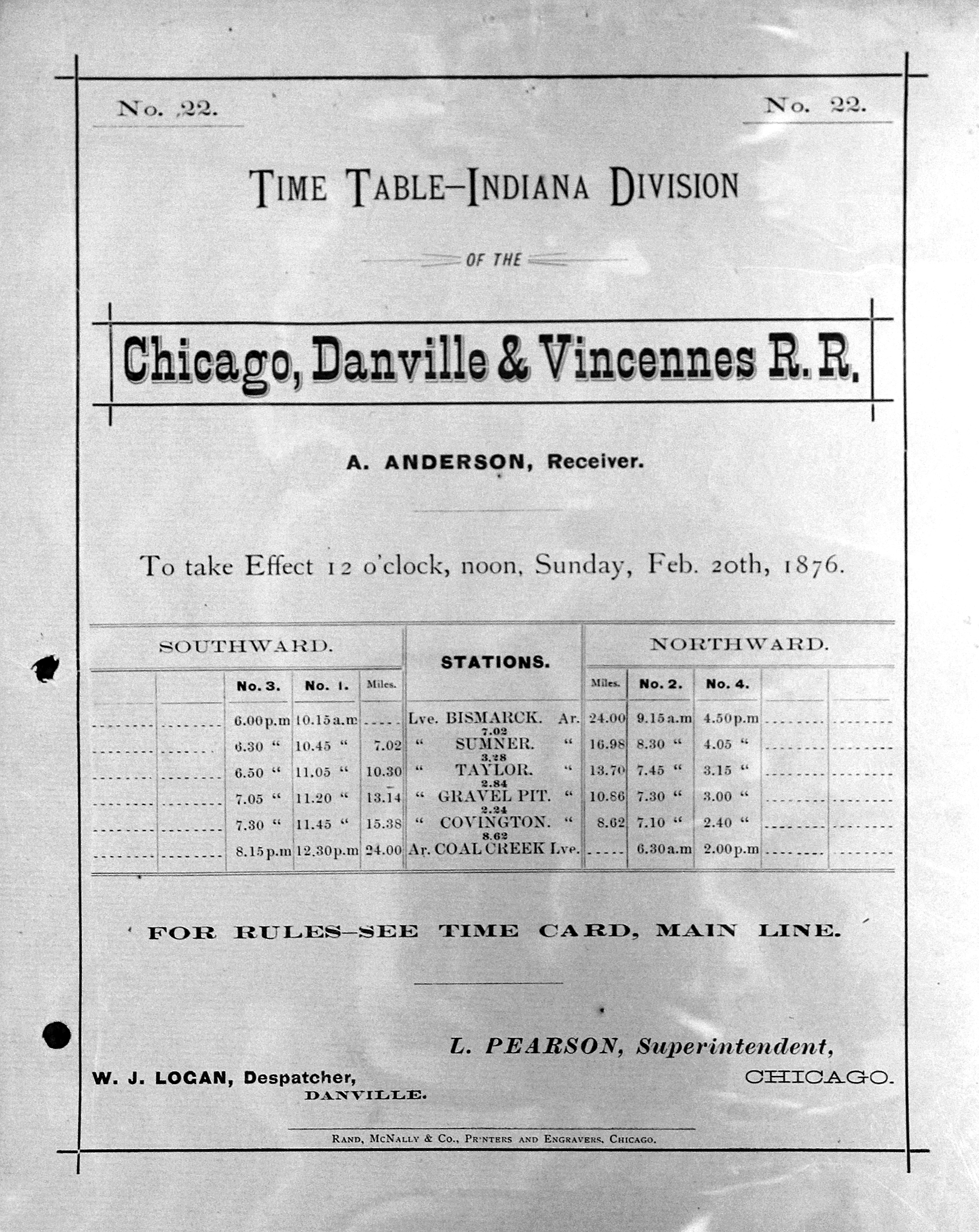
1876 timetable

== Johnsonville ==
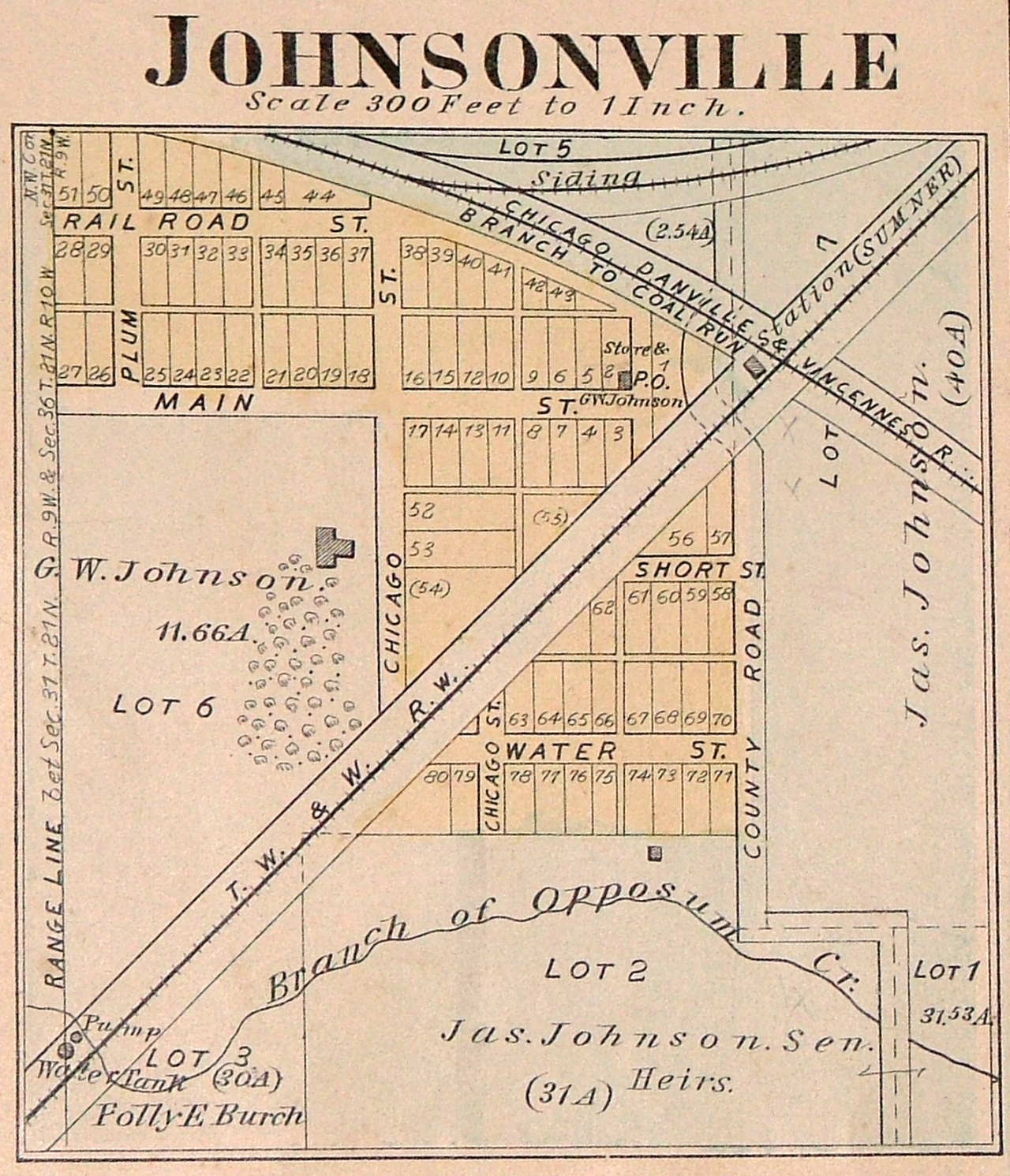
Map of Johnsonville from the 1877 Warren County atlas, showing the coal branch

Sumner Station was located in Warren County near the intersection of this new line with the existing Wabash Railroad. At this point, the Wabash Railroad ran from northeast to southwest, and the new line ran from northwest to southeast. Local landowner G. W. Johnson saw an opportunity and established the town of Johnsonville at this intersection. A post office opened there in 1875.

== Riot and closure ==
In December 1877, a murder took place in Stringtown, and although the culprit was convicted, problems increased between the 90 black and 225 white miners. The following April, five black miners were killed; at the trial in June, fourteen miners were indicted, but were acquitted due to lack of evidence that they were involved, and a riot began. A telegram was sent to Governor James D. Williams, who sent the Wabash Guards to restore order. Fifty shots were fired and four men were killed.

The railroad itself had problems with bankruptcy and strikes; according to an 1881 history, an injunction was to be filed against the railroad, but the presiding judge was away, and "as a result the road was torn up and never rebuilt". In 1877, the Chicago, Danville and Vincennes Railroad, along with two other railroads, was consolidated into the Chicago and Eastern Illinois Railroad. The portion of the line that ran from Covington to Bismarck was closed on June 15, 1879, and the tracks were taken up in 1880.

Coal continued to be mined at Stringtown in the 1880s and was taken north to Covington, then on to Danville via the Indiana, Bloomington and Western Railway. The labor problems at the mine affected its production, and by 1888 the remainder of the line had been taken up. This was the end of the Pumpkin Vine Railroad.

== Unfinished portion ==
The plan had called for this line to continue south from Covington and Snoddy's Mill, into Parke County and past Montezuma, then southeast to Brazil in Clay County. Construction on this portion of the line started, and by 1873, the railroad grade had entered Parke County from the south, moving north along the Raccoon Creek. Some truss bridges were built, but this part of the line was never completed.

== Present day ==
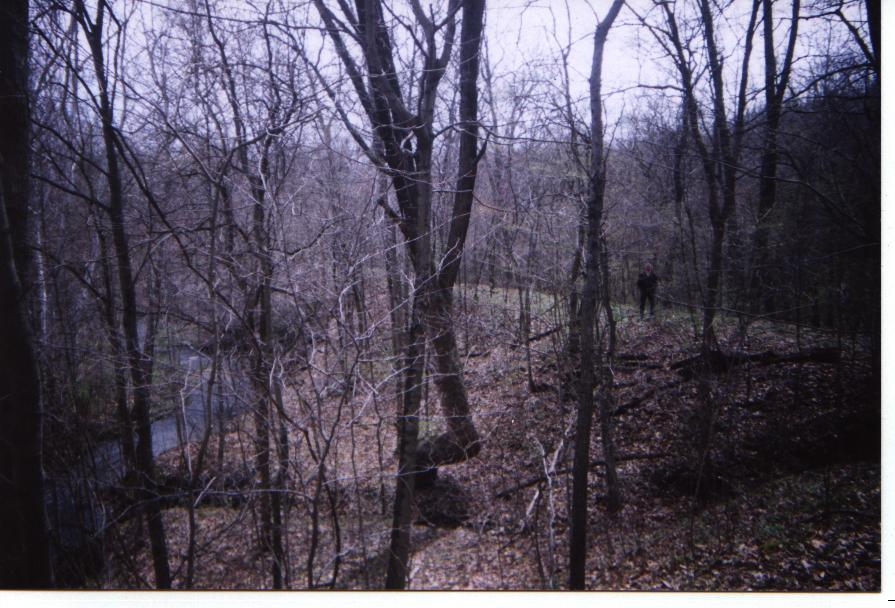
Pumpkin Vine Railroad grade in 2007

There are still several places along the former route where traces of the grade can be seen, and in a few wooded areas small sections of the grade are virtually untouched (though of course grass-covered and with no ties or rails). Portions of the route are visible on satellite images.

== Bibliography ==
- Clifton, Thomas, ed. (1913). Past and Present of Fountain and Warren Counties Indiana. Indianapolis: B. F. Bowen and Company.
