= Johnsonville, Indiana =

- Unincorporated community
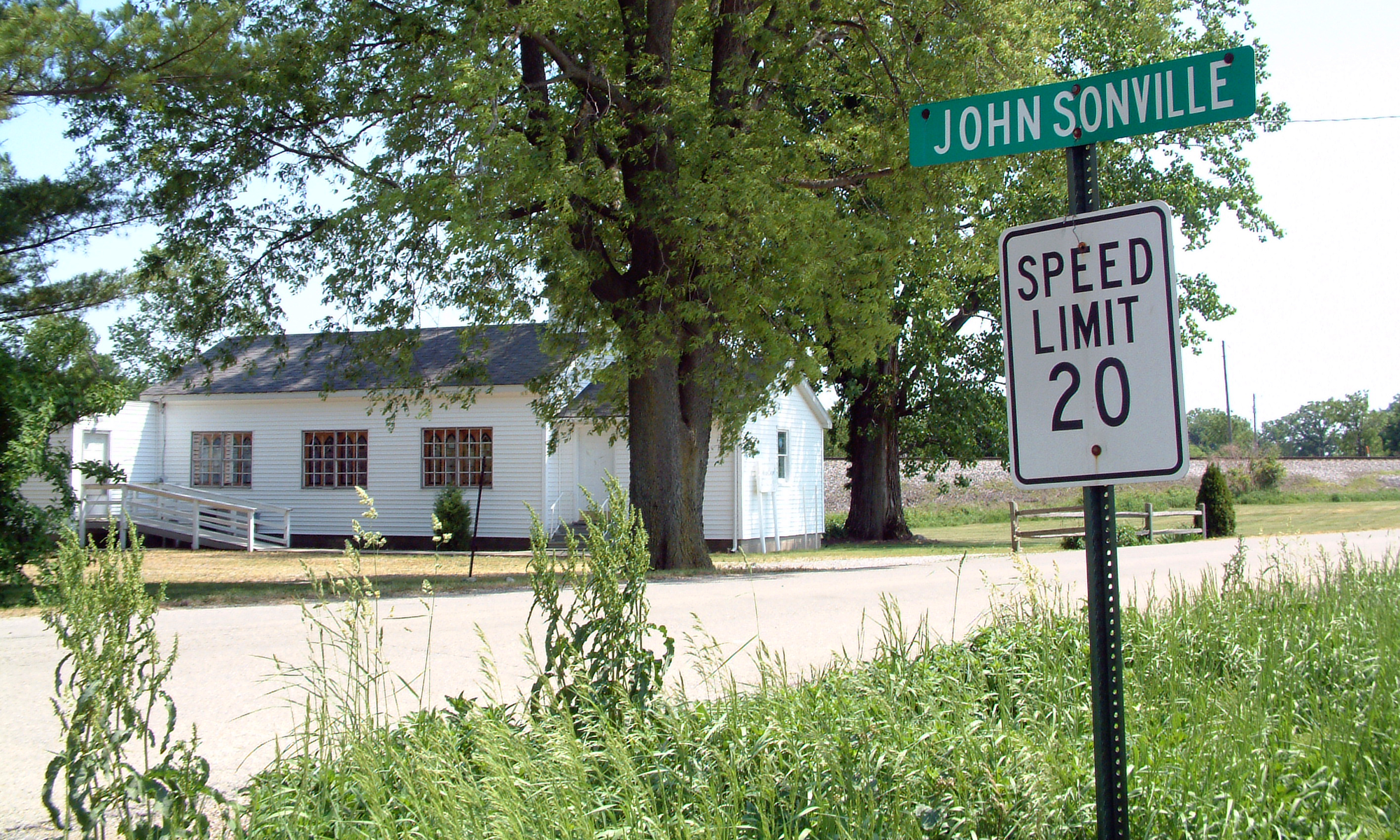
- Looking toward Williams Chapel

- Location within Warren County, Indiana Location within Indiana Location within the United States
- Coordinates: 40°13′39″N 87°29′11″W
- Country: United States
- State: Indiana
- County: Warren
- Township: Steuben
- Founded: 1874
- Founded by: John R. Johnson Sr.
- Elevation: 676 ft (206 m)
- Time zone: UTC-5 (Eastern (EST))
  - Summer (DST): UTC-4 (EDT)
- ZIP code: 47993
- Area code: 765
- GNIS feature ID: 437068

Johnsonville is a small unincorporated community in Steuben Township, Warren County, in the U.S. state of Indiana.

== History ==
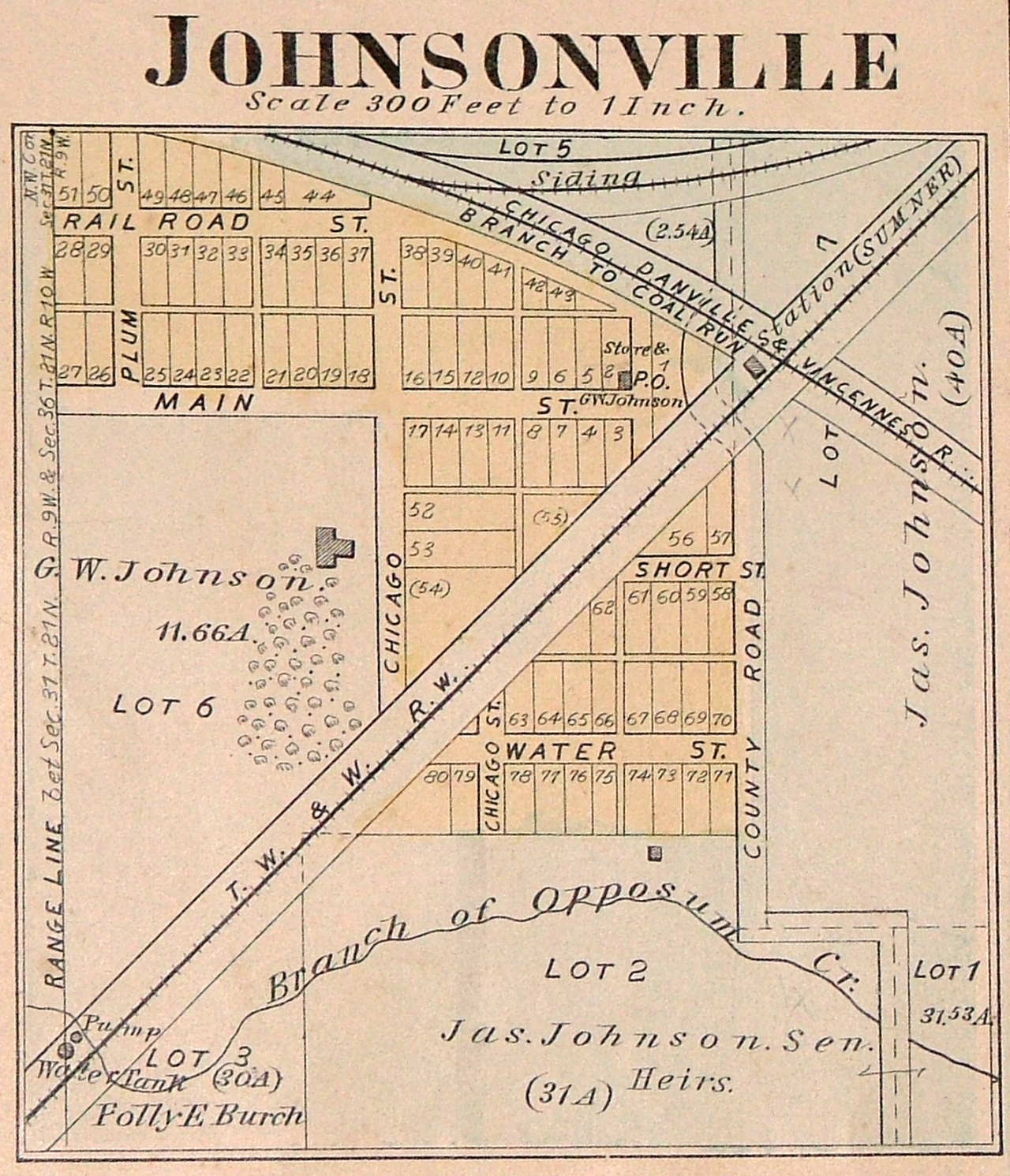
Map from 1877 Warren County atlas

Johnsonville was platted July 8, 1874 by John R. Johnson, Senior, near Sumner Station. A post office was established there on December 2, 1875, with George W. Johnson as postmaster. As of September 1875 there were said to be about 50 people living in the town; there were several businesses including a dry goods store and a tan yard that produced leather. The town also had a druggist, a doctor, a lawyer, a blacksmith, a grain dealer, a railway agent, a tinker, and a boarding-house. As of 1913, the population was about 80.

The town was established at the intersection of two rail lines: the existing Toledo, Wabash and Western Railroad and the new Coal Branch of the Chicago, Danville and Vincennes Railroad (the branch being known as the "Pumpkin Vine" Railroad), which was laid down in 1872. The well-chosen location favored the town's success, but trains had stopped running on the Pumpkin Vine by 1880, just six years after the town was formally established; and when the rails were removed shortly thereafter, the site's importance was diminished, and the town began to dwindle. The post office closed on August 31, 1907.

As of 2007, Johnsonville consists of a non-denominational Christian church and a few residences.

== Geography ==
Johnsonville is located in the southwestern portion of the township, at the T-intersection of County Road 875 West (a paved road) and 600 South (a gravel road). It is about 2.25 miles (3.62 km) east of the Illinois border. Flat, open farmland lies to the north and west, while wooded valleys and hollows lie to the southeast. The Norfolk Southern Railway passes southwest through Johnsonville on its way to Danville, Illinois.
