= Johnsonville (company) =

Sausage company headquartered in Sheboygan Falls, Wisconsin

Johnsonville, LLC
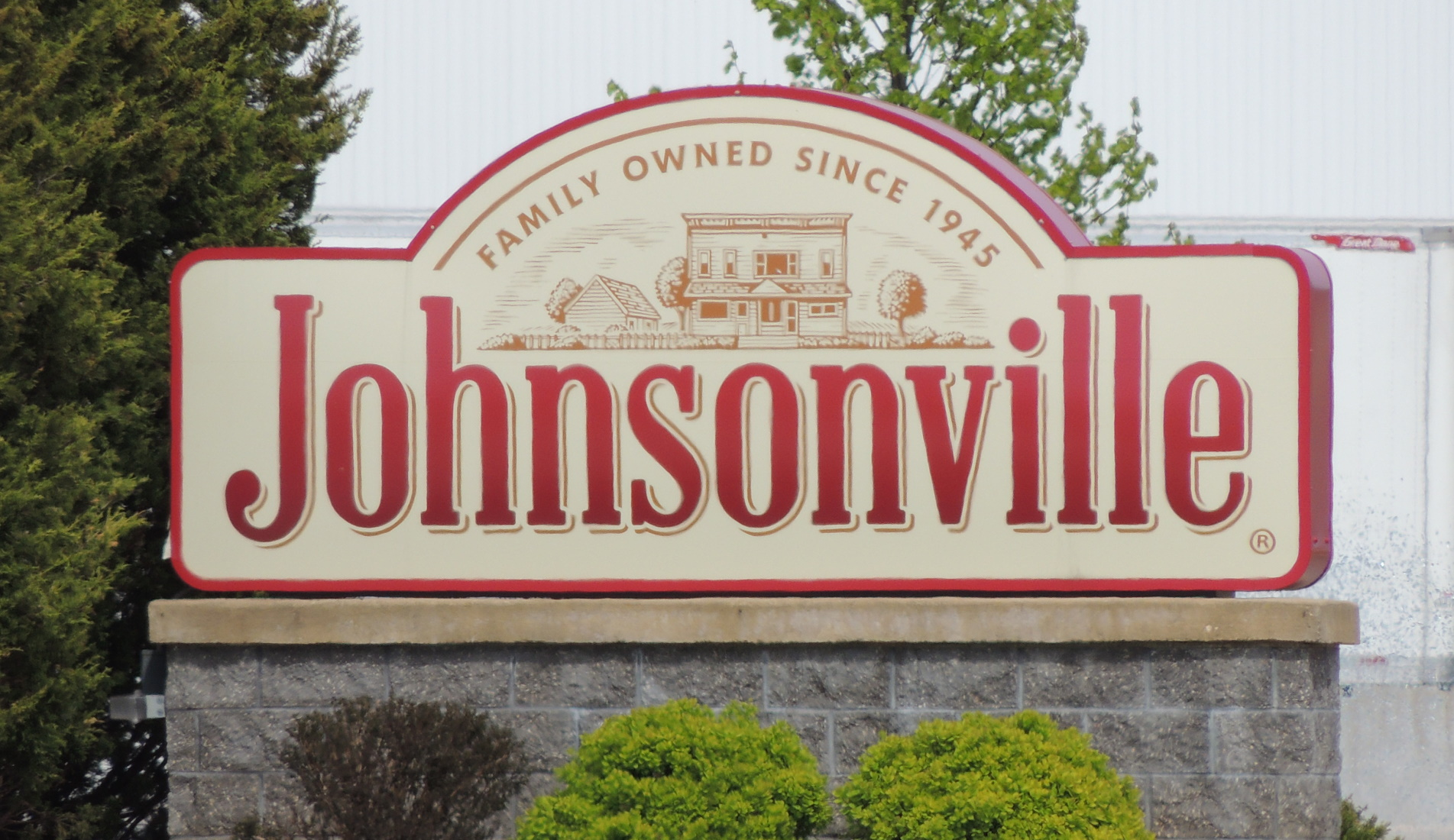
- Type: Private
- Industry: Food processing
- Founded: 1945; 81 years ago
- Founder: Carl Hirsch and Ralph F. and Alice Stayer
- Headquarters: Sheboygan Falls, Wisconsin, U.S.
- Key people: Don Fussner, (CEO)
- Products: Sausage
- Number of employees: 4,000
- Website: johnsonville.com

Johnsonville is a American sausage company headquartered near Sheboygan Falls, Wisconsin. It is one of the largest sausage producers in the United States and the largest sausage brand by revenue in the United States.

== History ==
In 1945, Carl Hirsch and Ralph F. & Alice Stayer, opened a butcher shop and named it after the hometown community of Johnsonville, Wisconsin. Ralph F. Stayer took over the business when Carl Hirsch abruptly died at age 56. Johnsonville is available in more than 45 countries. Privately owned, the company has approximately 4,000 employees, which they refer to as "members."

In 2014, Johnsonville had the most sow harvest capacity in the United States, with the facilities to harvest 3,400 pigs daily.

In 2024, based on a survey of 170,000 U.S.-based workers at American companies, Johnsonville was named among the nation's top midsize employers. Johnsonville also made this list in 2022 and 2023.

In June 2025, competitor Hormel Foods filed a lawsuit against Johnsonville, alleging that the company had illegally obtained sausage recipes and market intel from Hormel.

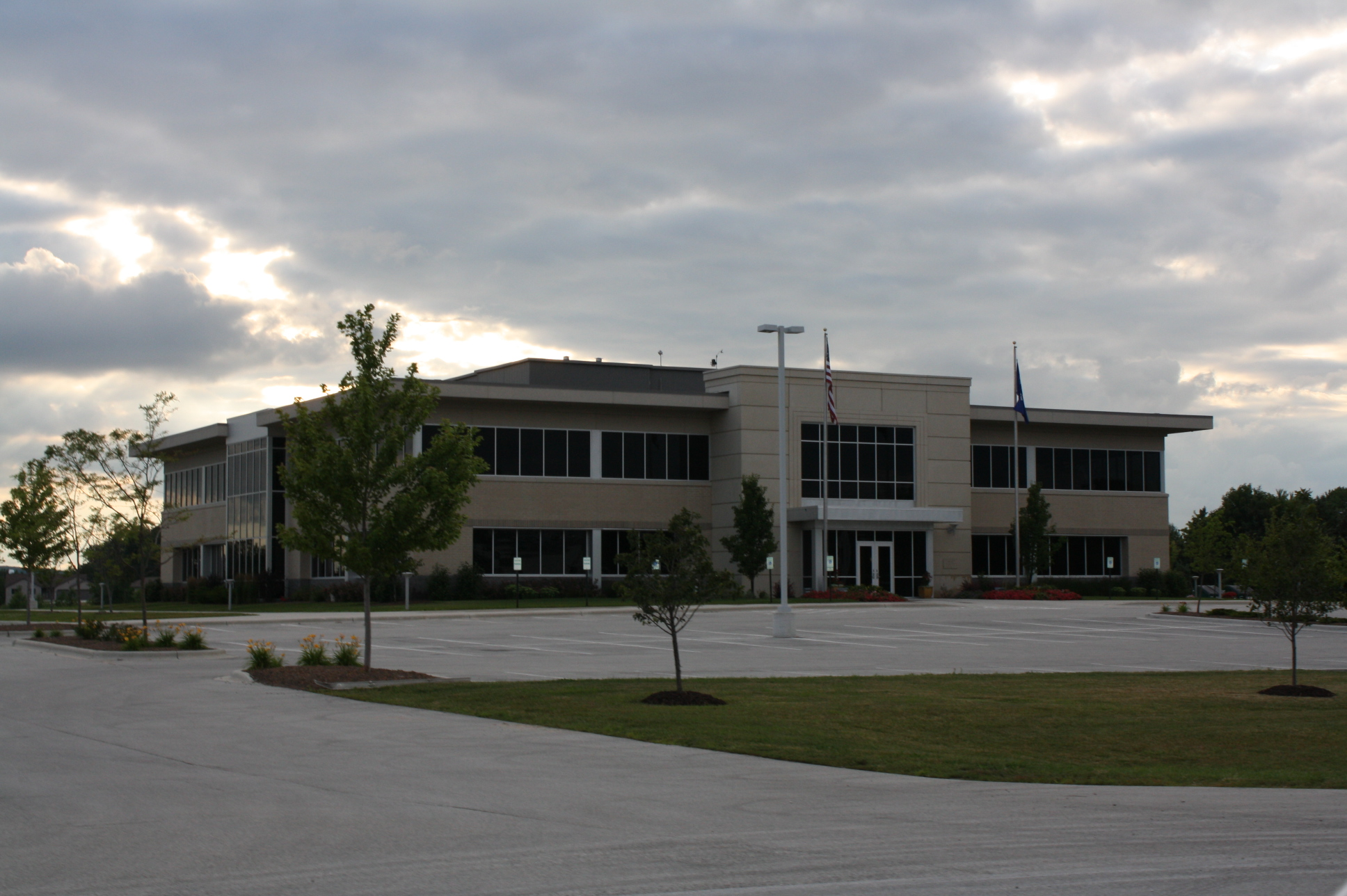
Corporate headquarters

== Products ==
Johnsonville produces over 70 different types of sausage products, including: brats, grillers, Italian sausage, smoked-cooked links, breakfast sausage in fully cooked and fresh varieties, chicken sausage, meatballs and summer sausage.

== Sponsorships ==
The company was the title sponsor for the American Cornhole League from 2017 until 2024.
