= Chicago, Danville and Vincennes Railroad =

American railroad company

Overview
- Headquarters: Chicago
- Locale: Eastern Illinois, from Chicago to Danville
- Dates of operation: 1865–1877
- Successor: Chicago and Eastern Illinois Railroad

Technical
- Length: 131 miles (211 km)

The Chicago, Danville and Vincennes Railroad was a railroad company that served various communities along the eastern border of the U.S. state of Illinois in the 1870s. The original plan called for a line to connect Chicago with Lawrence County, Illinois (across the river from Vincennes, Indiana), via Danville and Paris; it ran from Chicago to Danville before it was consolidated into the Chicago and Eastern Illinois Railroad in 1877.

== History ==
The railroad was granted a charter in 1834, but the company was not begun until much later. In 1865, Chicago resident Joseph E. Young incorporated the company; the incorporation was approved by the Illinois legislature. In 1869, the first mortgage was issued, on a term of 40 years; it provided $2.5 million in bonds at an interest rate of seven percent. Construction began in 1869, and by 1871 a line was completed from Dolton (near Chicago) to Danville. Between these locations it passed through 31 stations and covered a distance of 131 miles (211 km). It supported seven northbound and seven southbound trains each day; some carried freight and others carried passengers. Four of the passenger trains (two southbound and two northbound) only ran between Chicago and Blue Island, a distance of 20 miles (32 km). Travel time for the entire route varied from 6 hours to 7 hours and 15 minutes, making an average speed of approximately 20 miles per hour (32 km/h).

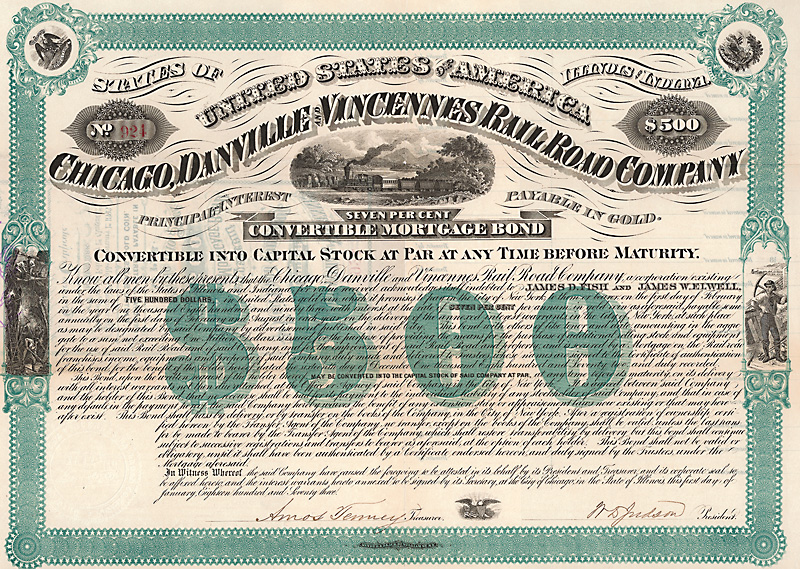
Gold Bond of the Chicago, Danville & Vincennes Railroad Company from the 1st January 1873

The railroad was consolidated with several others in 1872, first with the Rossville and Indiana Railroad Company, then the Attica and Terre Haute Railroad Company, then the Western Railroad Company. In each case, the consolidated company maintained the name "Chicago, Danville and Vincennes Railroad". As a result of these consolidations, the company was enabled to build a coal branch to Brazil, Indiana in Clay County, through Warren, Fountain and Parke Counties. The first portion of this line was constructed as far as the coal mines south of Covington. It was known as the Indiana Division, but was also called the Pumpkin Vine Railroad. It began operation in 1873, but the line never reached Brazil. According to the minutes of a meeting of the Board of Directors, the cost of building this line was substantially more than expected, due partly to the difficulty of crossing the Wabash River between Warren and Fountain Counties.

The company soon began to run into financial difficulties. It failed to pay the interest on its mortgages, and attempted to resolve this by issuing further bonds in 1873. Foreclosure and sale occurred in 1877; the Illinois division sold for $1,450,000, and the Indiana division for $115,000. The railroad, along with two others, was consolidated into the Chicago and Eastern Illinois Railroad on August 28, 1877.

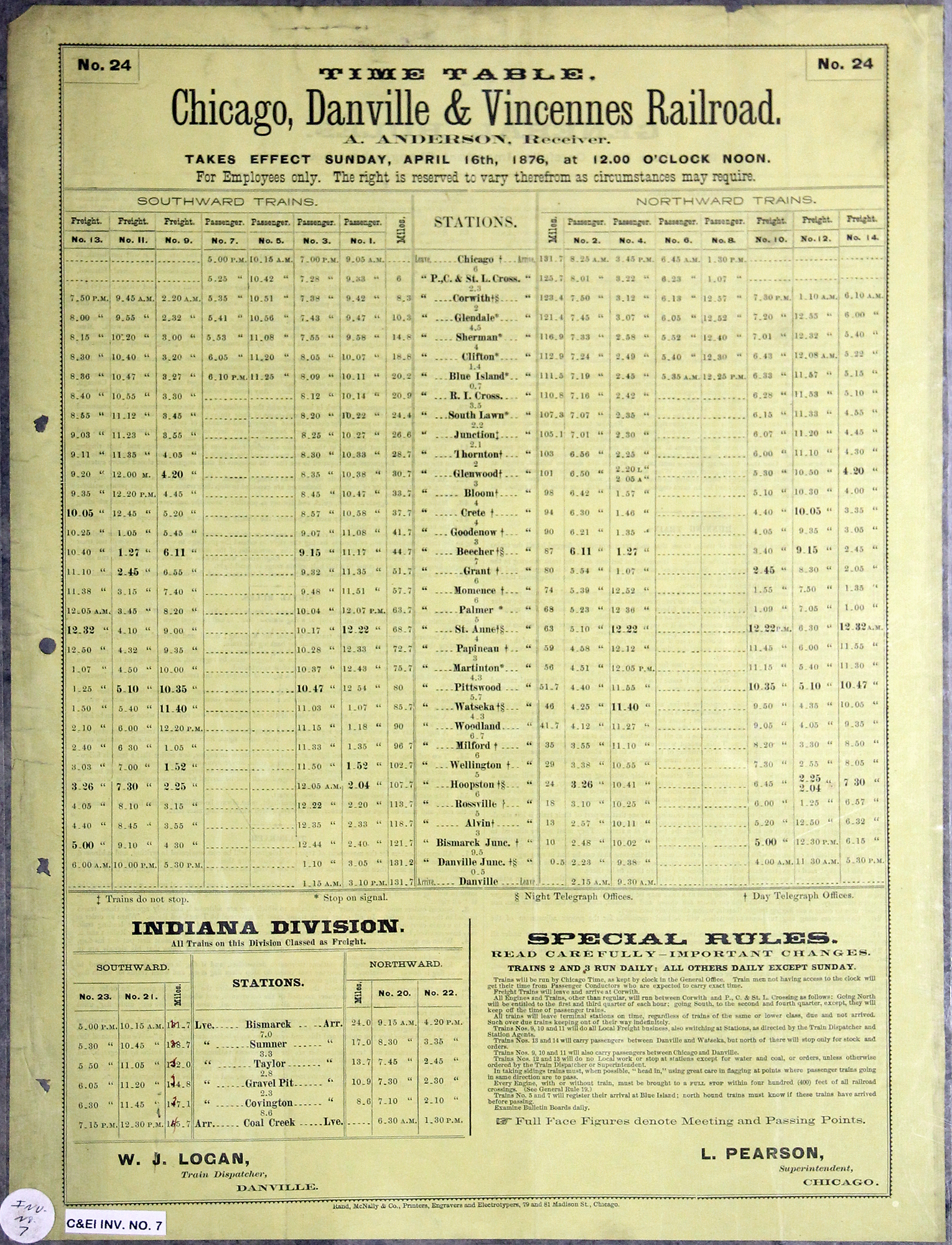
1876 timetable

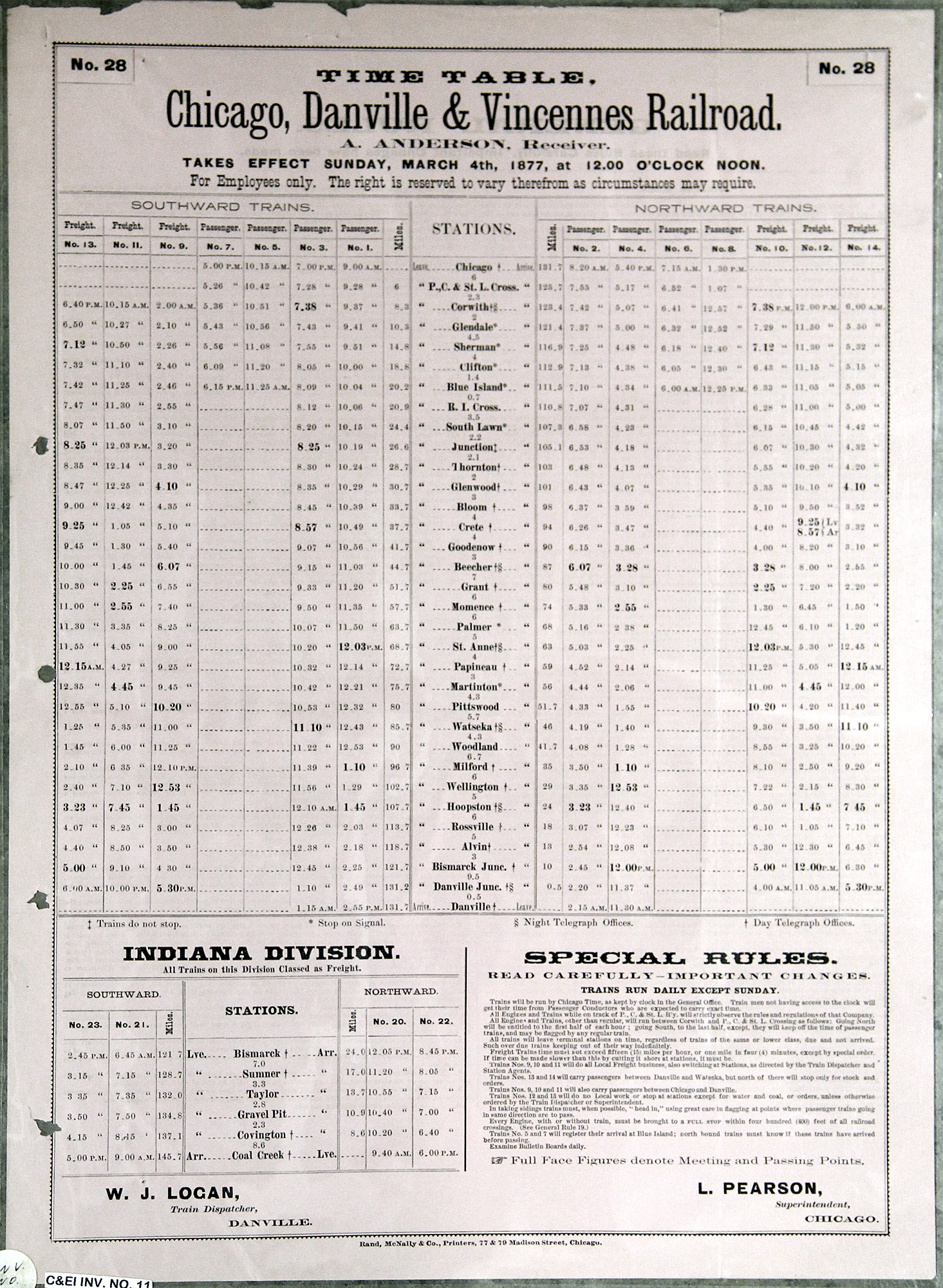
1877 timetable
