= Boatyard Historic District =

Historic district in Tennessee, United States

- U.S. National Register of Historic Places
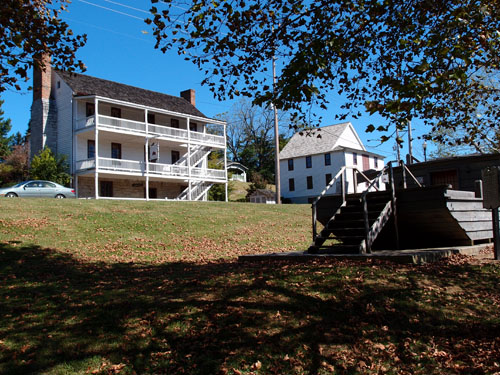

- Location within Tennessee
- Nearest city: Kingsport, Tennessee
- Coordinates: 36°33′02″N 82°36′17″W
- Area: 385 acres (1.56 km^{2})
- Built: 1775
- Architectural style: Late Victorian, Federal
- NRHP reference No.: 73001785
- Added to NRHP: December 12, 1973

The Boatyard Historic District, in Sullivan and Hawkins counties near Kingsport, Tennessee is a 385 acres (1.56 km^{2}) historic district which was listed on the National Register of Historic Places in 1973. The listing included seven contributing buildings, four contributing sites, and a contributing object.

Paraphrasing, it includes area on the north side of the South Fork of the Holston River, area on both sides of the North Fork of the Holston River. It includes the lower end of the Long Island of the Holston (a U.S. National Historical Landmark). It includes most of the land included in the 1802 town of Christianville, all of the land, except the area north of the railroad, included in the 1818 town of Rossville, the Christian's Fort area; and the Rotherwood area. <end paraphrasing>

Architecture: Late Victorian, Federal

Historic function: Domestic; Transportation; Defense; Commerce/trade Historic subfunction: Department Store; Water-related; Single Dwelling; Fortification; Road-related; Battle Site
