= Johnsonville, Wisconsin =

Johnsonville
- Unincorporated community
- Location within the state of Wisconsin
- Coordinates: 43°47′54″N 87°54′34″W
- Country: United States
- State: Wisconsin
- County: Sheboygan
- Time zone: UTC-6 (Central (CST))
  - Summer (DST): UTC-5 (CDT)
- Area code: 920

Johnsonville (also Schnapsville, Whiskeyville) is an unincorporated community located in the Town of Sheboygan Falls in Sheboygan County, Wisconsin, United States.
