= Edward Pessen =

Edward Pessen (1920–1992) was an American historian.

== Life ==
Edward Pessen was born to a working-class Jewish immigrant family in New York City. After army service Pessen completed undergraduate education (in 1947) and gained a PhD (in 1954) from Columbia University. He taught at several universities, ending as professor of history at the graduate school of the City University of New York before retiring to south Florida where he taught his final class, a senior seminar on the Cold War, as an adjunct professor at Florida International University. He was a founder of the Society for Historians of the Early American Republic, and was the society's president in 1985–6.

== Works ==
- The social philosophies of early American leaders of labor, 1954
- Most uncommon Jacksonians: the radical leaders of the early labor movement, 1967
- New perspectives on Jacksonian parties and politics, 1969
- Jacksonian America: society, personality, and politics, 1969
- Riches, class, and power before the Civil War, 1973
- Three centuries of social mobility in America, 1974
- Jacksonian panorama, 1976
- The Many-faceted Jacksonian era: new interpretations, 1977
- The log cabin myth: the social backgrounds of the presidents, 1984
