= Johnstonville, North Carolina =

Extinct settlement

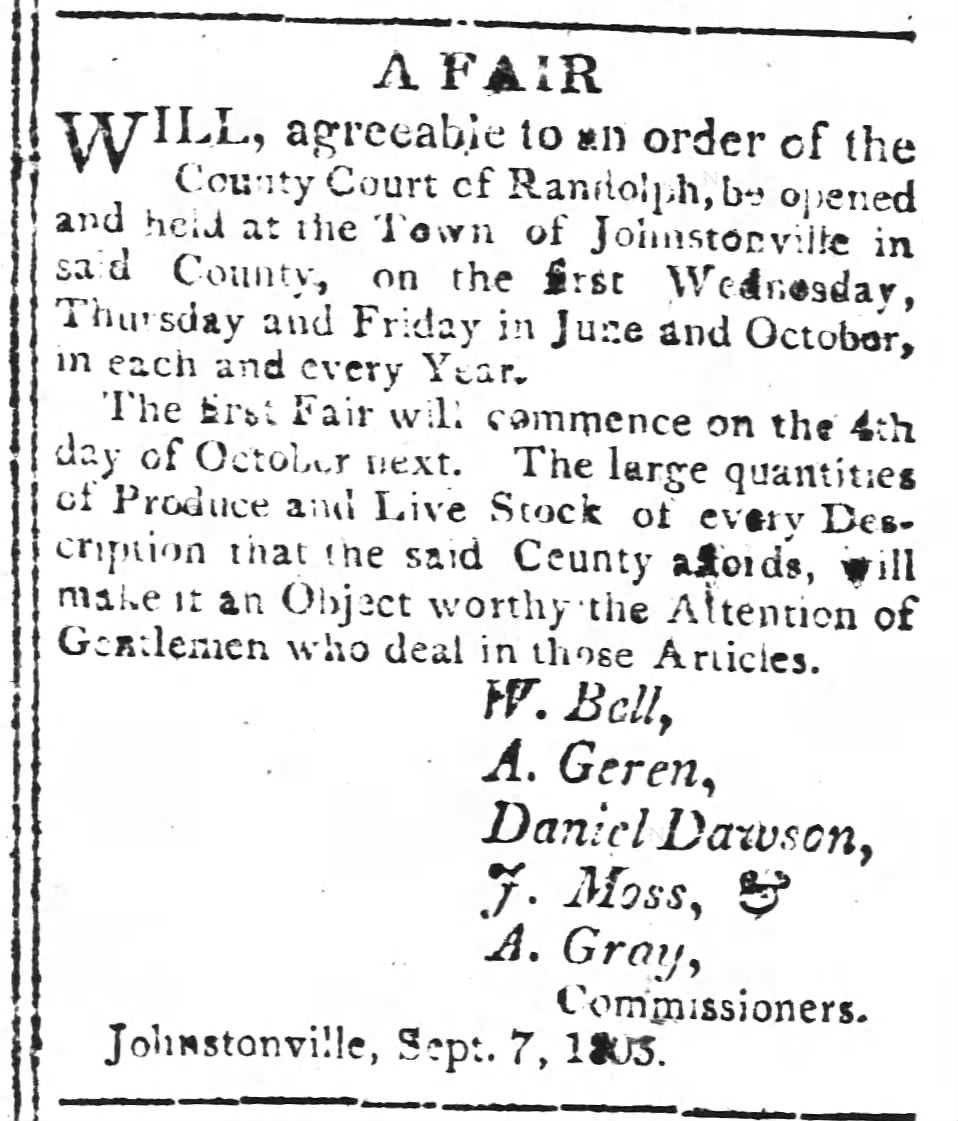
"A FAIR" Raleigh Register, October 7, 1805

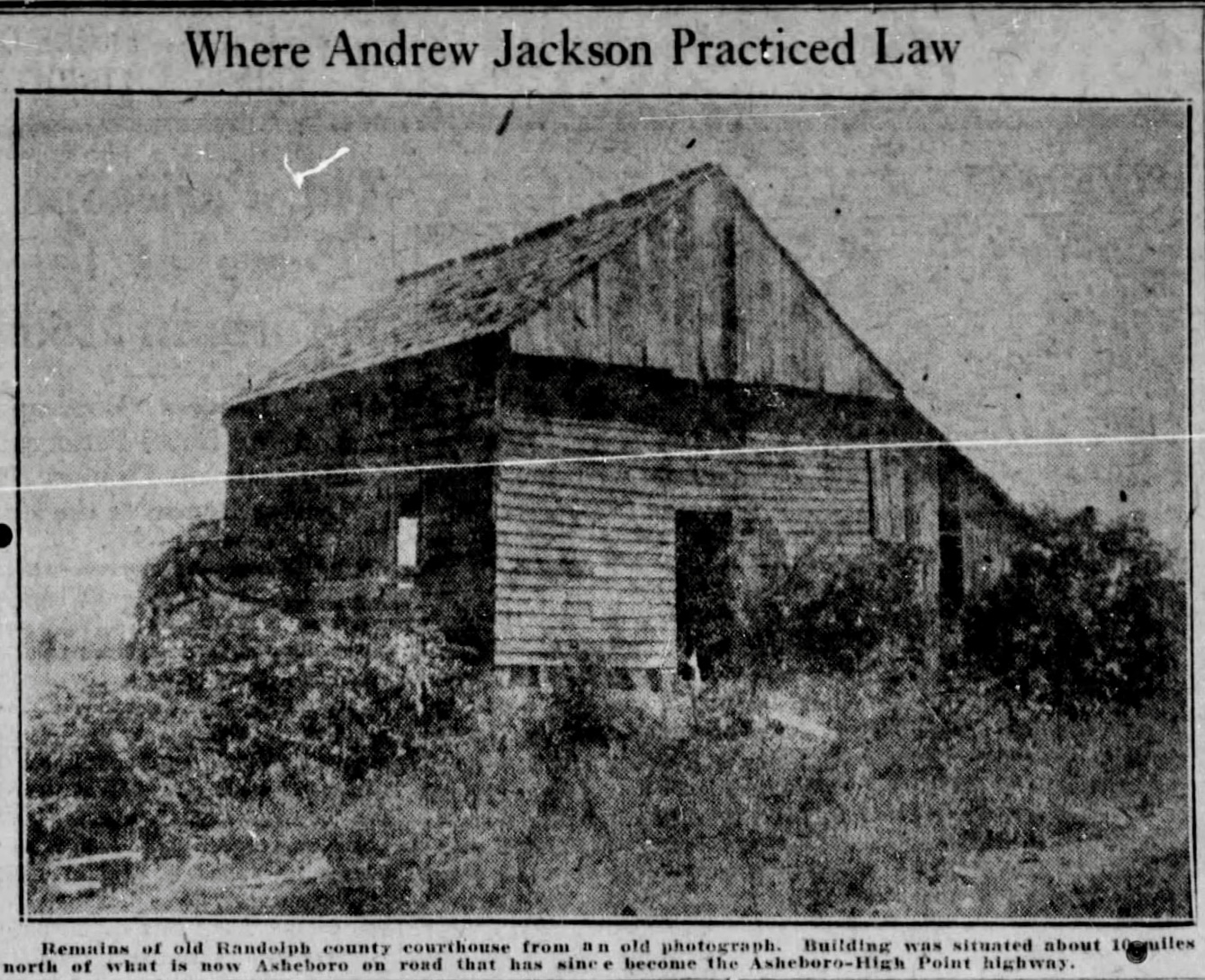
Randolph County (North Carolina) courthouse at Johnsonville, North Carolina, photographed prior to 1876 demolition ("Where Andrew Jackson practiced law" Greensboro Daily News, North Carolina, August 9, 1925)

Johnstonville, North Carolina (frequently also Johnsonville) is an extinct settlement of Randolph County, North Carolina, United States. Johnstonville stood about 2 mi (3.2 km) west of Randleman, on old U.S. 311, "about where the WGHP Fox8 transmission towers stand" as of 2024. Johnstonville was one of 64 North Carolina ghost towns documented by a legislative research commission in the 1980s.

== History ==
Prior to the organization of the United States, the spot was called Cross Roads, and stood at the intersection of the Indian Trading Path and the Cape Fear Road or Old Moravian Road. These roads carried traffic from Virginia and the Winston-Salem area of North Carolina.

Johnstonville was reportedly named for North Carolina governor Samuel Johnston. Located 9 mi (14 km) northwest of Asheboro, the county courts met there, quarterly, for roughly 15 years during the late 18th century. The courthouse building and other public buildings were constructed on a five-acre tract assigned for the purpose of serving as a county seat. Construction on the "quaint two-story, hip-roof house" courthouse began in 1784. The courthouse was built out of "nails made in a smith-shop near the place, and the plank were sawed by hand." The courthouse was in use beginning in March 1786. Future U.S. president and then newly credentialed lawyer Andrew Jackson presented himself as a new member of the bar at the Johnsonville court on December 11, 1787. He was also present March 1788. From 1789 Randolph County was part of the Superior Court District of Salisbury, based out of Salisbury.

The county seat was relocated to Asheboro in 1798. The old wooden courthouse building, demolished in 1876, was located at "Brown's crossroads about 10 mi (16 km) north of what is now Asheboro and at the junction of the Salisbury–HilIsboro and Salem–Fayetteville roads. The site is about 100 yd (91 m) off what is now the Asheboro-High Point highway."

Because it stood at a crossroads and was host to the courts, the settlement grew quickly, and "streets were opened, about 75 lots were purchased and improved, and besides the public buildings, there were stores, hotels, bar rooms, smith shops, wood shops, shoe shops, hatter shops," etc. One of the stores was managed by Alexander Gray. In early days there was a Society of Friends meetinghouse in the vicinity. A weekly stagecoach served the town. The county fair, which was "held there for many years," was famed for its horse races, foot races, and shooting contests.

The Fayetteville and Western plank road, one of the products of the plank road craze of the 1850s, passed through Johnsonville. The 129 mi (208 km) road started at Fayetteville, ran through Johnsonville, Carthage, Asheboro, High Point, and Salem, and ended in Bethania, with toll gates placed every 11 mi (18 km).

== Sources ==
- Blair, J. A. (1890). Reminiscences of Randolph County. Greensboro, North Carolina: Reece & Elam, book and job printers. OCLC 6408982.
