= List of cemeteries in Warren County, Indiana =

This is a list of cemeteries in Warren County, Indiana.

Name	Coordinates	Township	GNIS ID	Notes
Adams	40°19′47.28″N 87°13′55.38″W	Warren		
Armstrong	40°25′39.65″N 87°6′46.89″W	Medina		Established in 1848 and located just west of Armstrong Chapel. George D. Wagner, Indiana state representative elected in 1856 and a colonel during the Civil War, is buried here.
Baltimore	40°9′58.59″N 87°26′45.92″W	Mound	430468	Located on West Baltimore Hill Road, next to Rodgers. The town of Baltimore was located near here in the 1800s.
Bartlett	40°23′6″N 87°19′01″W	Liberty	430544	Defunct
Bethel	40°21′8.17″N 87°14′40.53″W	Warren	430897	Located approximately 1 mile (1.6 km) east of Indiana State Road 55, on the north side of County Road 250 North.
Brier / County Farm	40°21′37.61″N 87°19′48.22″W	Liberty	431521	
Briscoe / Keyes	40°24′51.66″N 87°20′59.47″W	Pine	431534	Located just northeast of the site of the defunct town of Brisco.
Bussell / Jones	40°27′34.7″N 87°19′15.83″W	Pine	437086	Located near the county meridian, on the south side of Indiana State Road 26 west of Pine Village. Stones here date from 1837 to 1961.
Carbondale	40°21′36.29″N 87°20′53.34″W	Liberty		
Cronkhite	40°14′7.29″N 87°27′13.98″W	Steuben		Defunct
Davis / Kochert	40°24′19.8″N 87°7′20.89″W	Medina	433347	
Goodwine	40°18′59.76″N 87°20′42.87″W	Liberty	435176	
Gopher Hill	40°11′7.75″N 87°29′23.63″W	Kent	435216	
Gray	40°26′28.79″N 87°17′15.82″W	Pine	435365	
Highland	40°17′34.56″N 87°16′56.67″W	Washington	436156	Located on the northeast side of Williamsport.
Hillside	40°17′28.89″N 87°16′49.57″W	Washington	436224	Located on the northeast side of Williamsport, just to the southeast and across the railroad from Highland Cemetery. James Frank Hanly, Governor of Indiana from 1905 to 1909, is buried here.
Hiser	40°10′39.41″N 87°31′33.95″W	Kent		Defunct
Hooker	40°26′57.19″N 87°18′57.86″W	Pine	436406	
Independence	40.347513°N 87.177715°W	Warren	436724	Located just to the north-northwest of the town of Independence. Zachariah Cicott, the county's first non-indigenous settler, is buried here.
Irish Catholic	40°14′0.05″N 87°27′57.37″W	Steuben		This Irish Catholic cemetery contains 42 marked graves and is the burial place of many of the Irish who had once worked on the railroads and had later worshiped at the Catholic Church at Marshfield.
James	40°22′52.13″N 87°13′9.70″W	Warren	436920	
Jordan	40°22′1.21″N 87°30′25.05″W	Jordan	437111	The earliest marker here is dated 1850.
Kester	40°19′38.98″N 87°17′2.54″W	Liberty	437273	
Locust Grove	40°26′14.26″N 87°26′8.09″W	Prairie		Located about 2 miles (3.2 km) northeast of the town of Tab and was established in 1830. Locust Grove Church was built just north of this cemetery in 1893.
Lyons	40°12′25.76″N 87°24′34.87″W	Steuben	438442	Lyons Cemetery was in use from 1839 through 1932.
Masonic	40°11′3.40″N 87°30′27.77″W	Kent	439492	Sometimes incorrect listed as "Mosonic".
McCabe	40°19′25.37″N 87°19′12.94″W	Liberty	438780	
Mitchel	40°20′44.76″N 87°21′29.26″W	Liberty		
Mound	40°25′4.10″N 87°12′21.94″W	Adams	439511	
Old Gopher Hill / Butterfield	40°10′46.33″N 87°30′33.99″W	Kent		Defunct. Approximately 30 graves were here, including one or two of William Henry Harrison's soldiers and members of the Butterfield family. This cemetery was destroyed in the 1920s.
Owens	40°17′14.36″N 87°20′16.71″W	Washington	440799	
Pine Village	40°26′55.51″N 87°15′28.03″W	Adams		
Pond Grove	40°28′2.92″N 87°5′47.83″W	Medina	441427	
Quaker	40°23′46.04″N 87°14′38.38″W	Adams	441684	
Rainsville	40°24′41.05″N 87°18′53.72″W	Pine	441749	
Redwood	40°16′48.61″N 87°26′0.91″W	Steuben	441842	
Robb / Baumgartner	40°16′46.67″N 87°19′12.07″W	Washington	442133	Stones here date back to 1831.
Rodgers	40°9′58.45″N 87°26′42.64″W	Mound	442243	Located on West Baltimore Hill Road, next to Baltimore. Sometimes incorrectly listed as "Roger".
Shanklin Hill	40°15′1.22″N 87°24′52.87″W	Pike	443283	This cemetery, and the hilly road upon which it is located, is sometimes incorrectly listed as "Shankland Hill".
Sisson	40°14′21.25″N 87°28′41.61″W	Steuben		Defunct
Tomlinson	40°14′25.18″N 87°28′19.33″W	Steuben		
Union-Harman	40°24′36.92″N 87°11′46.50″W	Adams	435742	
Upper Mound	40°8′32.64″N 87°25′23.42″W	Mound	445169	
Van Reed	40°23′30″N 87°21′04″W	Pine	445217	
West Lebanon	40°15′25.31″N 87°22′41.45″W	Pike	445781	Located on the southeast edge of the town of West Lebanon, this cemetery holds the grave of a Revolutionary War soldier named Richard Biddlecomb, along with a group of Civil War veterans in a circle surrounding a flag pole, the focus of the annual Memorial Day service.
