= Locust Grove, Warren County, Indiana =

Locust Grove
- Ghost town
- Location in Warren County
- Coordinates: 40°26′26″N 87°26′5″W
- Country: United States
- State: Indiana
- County: Warren
- Township: Prairie
- Time zone: UTC-5 (Eastern (EST))
  - Summer (DST): UTC-4 (EDT)
- ZIP code: 47917
- Area code: 765

Locust Grove was a small town (now extinct) in Prairie Township, Warren County, in the U.S. state of Indiana, located three miles northeast of Tab. A 1913 history describes the town's population as "less than a hundred", but all that remains at the site is the Locust Grove Church, Locust Grove Cemetery and a few homes.

== Geography ==
Locust Grove is located at the intersection of County Roads 850 N and 600 W. It sits in open farmland on a low, broad hill.
