= Walnut Grove, Warren County, Indiana =

Walnut Grove
- Ghost town
- Location in Warren County
- Coordinates: 40°24′40″N 87°24′56″W
- Country: United States
- State: Indiana
- County: Warren
- Township: Steuben
- Time zone: UTC-5 (Eastern (EST))
  - Summer (DST): UTC-4 (EDT)
- ZIP code: 47993
- Area code: 765

Walnut Grove was a small town (now extinct) in Prairie Township, Warren County, Indiana, located three miles east of Tab. A 1913 history describes the town's population as about 50.

== History ==
A post office was once established at Walnut Grove in 1872, and remained in operation until it was discontinued in 1900.

== Geography ==
Walnut Grove is located in flat, open farmland at the intersection of County Roads 650 North and 500 West.
