= Baltimore Cemetery =

Baltimore Cemetery may refer to:

- Baltimore Cemetery, at the site of the historic town of Baltimore, Indiana; a cemetery in Warren County, Indiana
- Baltimore Cemetery, in Berea, Baltimore, Maryland
- Baltimore National Cemetery, in Baltimore, Maryland
- Bohemian National Cemetery (Baltimore, Maryland)
