= Seeger Memorial Junior-Senior High School =

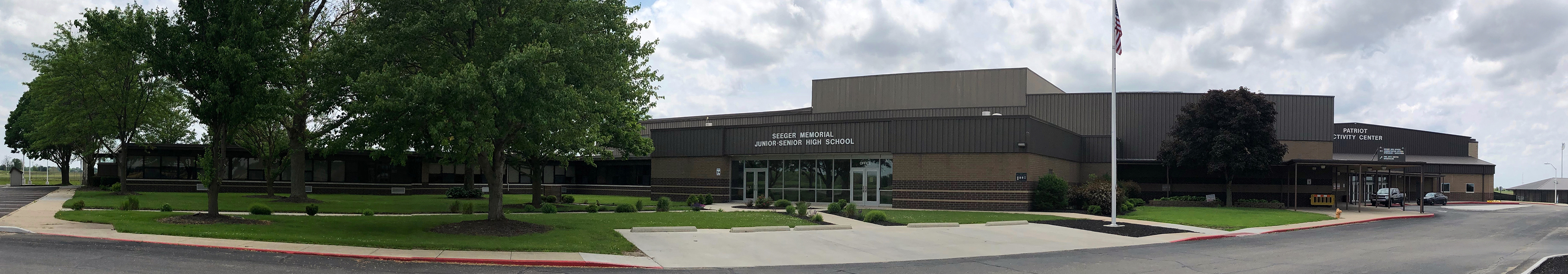

Location
- 1222 South State Road 263; West Lebanon, Warren County, Indiana 47991; United States
- 40.2984°N 87.3881°W

Information
- Type: Public
- Established: 1957
- Locale: Rural
- School district: Metropolitan School District of Warren County
- Principal: Zach Cotten
- Teaching staff: 39.50 (on a FTE basis)
- Grades: 7-12
- Enrollment: 606 (2023-2024)
- Student to teacher ratio: 15.34
- Colors: Scarlet, Navy and White
- Athletics conference: Wabash River Conference
- Nickname: Patriots
- Feeder schools: Pine Village Elementary, Warren Central Elementary, Williamsport Elementary
- Website: Official Website

Seeger Memorial Junior-Senior High School is the single high school and middle school serving Warren County, Indiana, and is located a mile and a half north of the town of West Lebanon. It is administered by the Metropolitan School District of Warren County in Williamsport.

== History ==
Seeger High School was established in 1957 through a $250,000 donation from local grain dealer and broker Ura Seeger; classes began in the fall of 1959. The school's original mascot was the Indian, and its colors red and grey, but in 1973 due to the consolidation of Pine Village, Williamsport, and Seeger High Schools, the mascot was changed to the Patriot and the colors to red, white and blue. Gary McMillen became the consolidated school's first principal. He was followed by Steve Lee, Dr. Roy Stroud, Richard Schelsky, Gary Kiger, Dan Nelson, Rob Beckett, and Zach Cotten.

== Demographics ==
The demographic breakdown of the 568 students enrolled in 2013-14 was:

- Male - 53.7%
- Female - 46.3%
- Native American/Alaskan - 0%
- Asian/Pacific islanders - 0.5%
- Black - 0.2%
- Hispanic - 0.7%
- White - 98.2%
- Multiracial - 0.4%

39.3% of the students were eligible for free or reduced lunch.

== Athletics ==
The Seeger Patriots compete in the Wabash River Conference. The school colors are scarlet, navy blue and white. The following IHSAA sanctioned sports are available:

•Baseball (boys) •Cheerleading (girls & boys) •Basketball (girls & boys) •Cross country (girls & boys) •Football (boys) (state champions, 2004) •Golf (girls & boys) •Softball (girls) •Swimming (girls & boys) •Tennis (girls & boys) •Track (girls & boys) •Volleyball (girls) •Wrestling (boys)

== Notable alumni ==
- Stephanie White (1995) - WNBA player and head coach

== See also ==
- List of high schools in Indiana
