= Warren County, Indiana =

County in Indiana, United States

- County
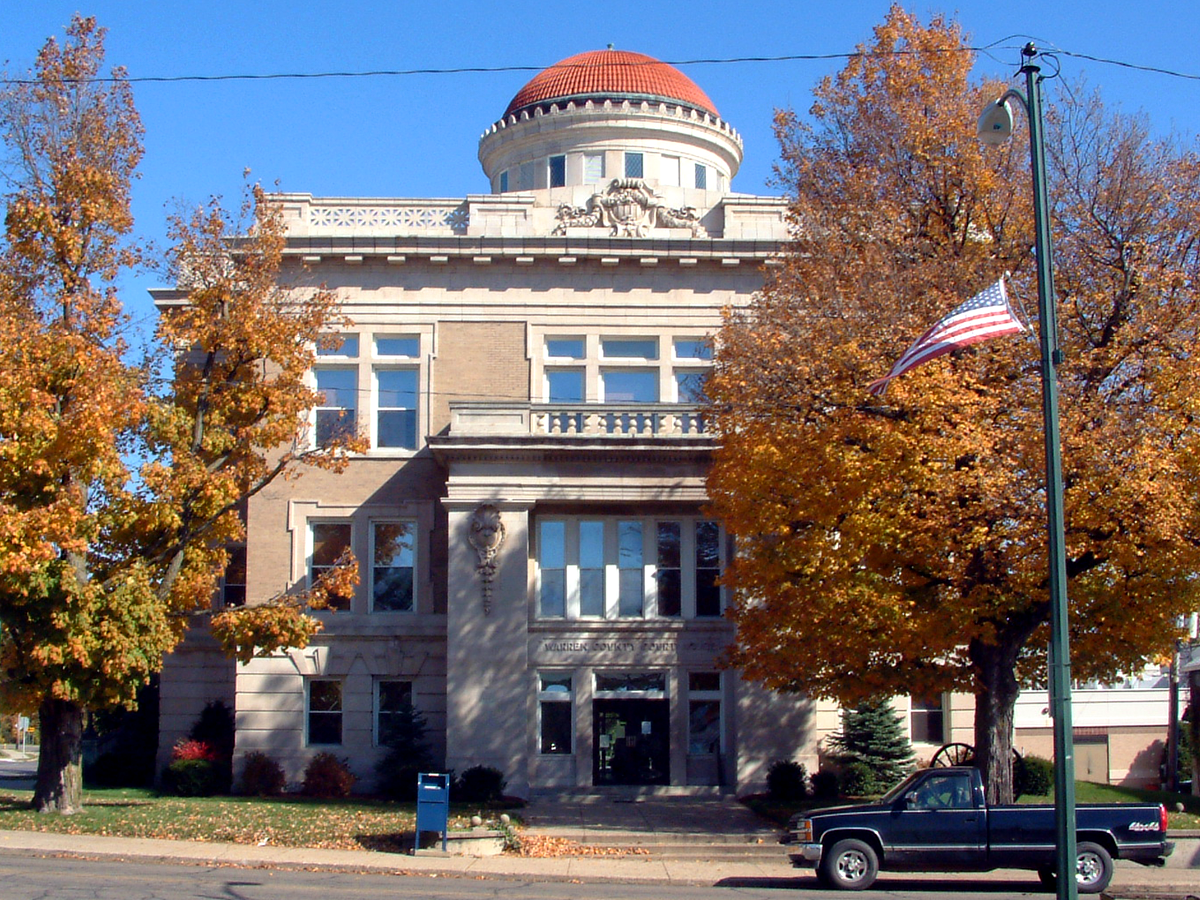
- Warren County Courthouse in Williamsport

- Location within the U.S. state of Indiana
- Coordinates: 40°21′N 87°22′W
- Country: United States
- State: Indiana
- Founded: March 1, 1827
- Named for: Joseph Warren
- Seat: Williamsport
- Largest town: Williamsport

Area
  - Total: 366.40 sq mi (949.0 km^{2})
  - Land: 364.68 sq mi (944.5 km^{2})
  - Water: 1.72 sq mi (4.5 km^{2}) 0.47%

Population (2020)
  - Total: 8,440
  - Estimate (2025): 8,474 ▲
  - Density: 23.1/sq mi (8.94/km^{2})
- Time zone: UTC−5 (Eastern)
  - Summer (DST): UTC−4 (EDT)
- Congressional district: 4th
- Website: www.warrencounty.in.gov
- Indiana county number 86

Warren County is a county in the U.S. state of Indiana. It lies in the western part of the state between the Illinois state line and the Wabash River. According to the 2020 census, it had a population of 8,440. Its county seat is Williamsport.

Before the arrival of non-indigenous settlers in the early 19th century, the area was inhabited by several Native American tribes. The county was officially established in 1827 and was the 55th county to be formed in Indiana.

It is one of the most rural counties in the state, with the third-smallest population and the lowest population density at about 23 inhabitants per square mile (8.9/km^{2}). The county has four incorporated towns with a total population of about 3,100, as well as many small unincorporated communities. The county is divided into 12 townships which provide local services.

Much of the land in the county is given over to agriculture, especially on the open prairie in the northern and western parts; the county's farmland is among the most productive in the state. Nearer the river along the southeastern border, the land has many hills, valleys, and tributary streams and is more heavily wooded. Agriculture, manufacturing, government, education, and health care each provide substantial portions of the jobs in the county. Four Indiana state roads cross the county, as do two U.S. Routes and one major railroad line.

== History ==
In the centuries before the arrival of European settlers, the area that became Warren County was on the boundary between the Miami and Kickapoo tribes. By the late 18th century, many Miami had moved further south; most of Indiana north of the Wabash was then occupied by the Potawatomi people. The first non-indigenous settler in the area was probably Zachariah Cicott, a French-Canadian who first traded with the Kickapoo and Potawatomi people around 1802. When General William Henry Harrison took an army from Vincennes to the Battle of Tippecanoe in late 1811, Cicott served as a scout; the trail taken by Harrison's army passed through the area that later became Warren County on its way to and from the battle site in Tippecanoe County. Following the War of 1812, Cicott resumed his trading on the Wabash; the state of Indiana was established in 1816, and Cicott built a log house in 1817 at the location where he later founded the town of Independence. Other settlers came to the area, but probably not until around 1822.

The county was established on March 1, 1827, by the Indiana General Assembly. It was named for Joseph Warren, who was killed in 1775 at the Battle of Bunker Hill, in which he fought as a private because his commission as a general had not yet taken effect. The short-lived town of Warrenton was the original Warren County seat, chosen by commissioners in March 1828; the next year an act was passed calling for the seat to be relocated, and in June 1829 it was moved to Williamsport.

The first county courthouse was a log house in Warrenton that belonged to (and was occupied by) Enoch Farmer, one of the county's earliest settlers. When the county seat moved to Williamsport, a log house belonging to the town's founder, William Harrison, served this purpose for several years. The first purpose-built courthouse was completed in 1835 at a cost of $2,000; (Note: A $2,000 capital expense in 1835 would be roughly equivalent to $1,030,000 in 2009.) in 1872, it was replaced with a new building that cost $48,000. (Note: A $48,000 capital expense in 1872 would be roughly equivalent to $11,300,000 in 2009.) The third courthouse was built in 1886, in a new section of town that grew around the newly constructed railroad. That building burned in 1907, and the fourth and current Warren County courthouse was completed on the same site in 1908 at a cost of $115,000. (Note: A $115,000 capital expense in 1908 would be roughly equivalent to $15,500,000 in 2009.)

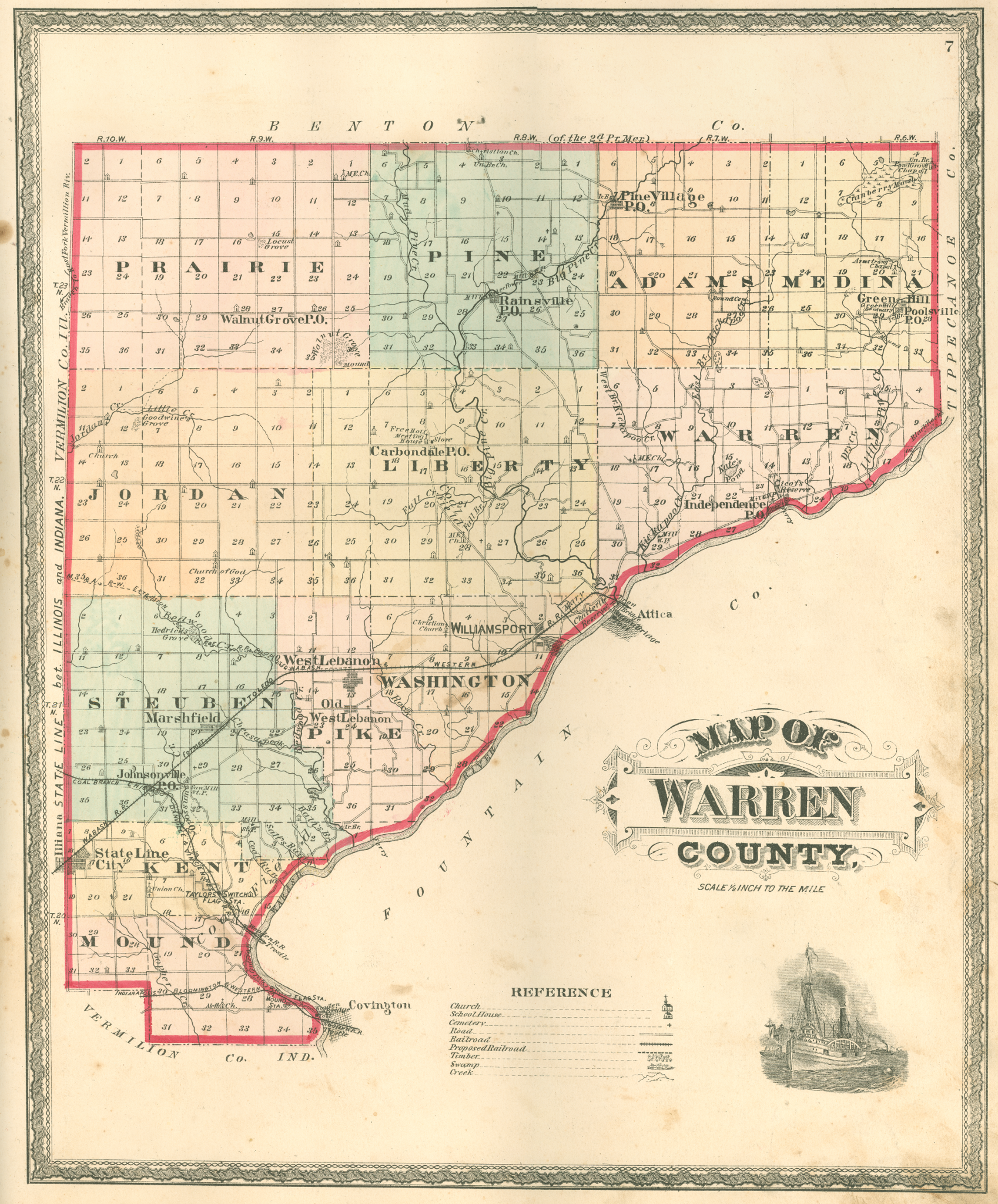
Map of Warren County from an 1877 county atlas

As the 19th century progressed, the United States government's Indian removal policy pushed Native American tribes west of the Mississippi River. In 1830, the Indian Removal Act was signed into law, and though that act did not directly address the Potawatomi people of Indiana, it led to several additional treaties that resulted in their removal. In what came to be known as the Potawatomi Trail of Death, about 860 Potawatomi Indians who had refused to leave were forced to move from Indiana to Kansas. On September 14, 1838, the group camped near Williamsport, and on September 15 they camped in the southwestern part of the county before moving into Illinois. Before reaching their destination in Kansas, over 40 of them had died, many of them children; two children died and were buried at the second Warren County campsite.

When the county was established, the Wabash River was vital to transportation and shipping. Zachariah Cicott traded up and down the river, and cities like Attica, Perrysville, Baltimore and Williamsport were founded near the river's banks and flourished because of it. In the 1840s, the Wabash and Erie Canal began to operate and provided even broader shipping opportunities, but the canal favored towns which were on the "right side" of the river; the canal was on the Fountain County side, and towns like Baltimore dwindled as a result. Some towns, such as Williamsport and Perrysville, managed to participate in canal traffic through the use of side-cuts that brought traffic from the canal across the river. When railroads were constructed starting in the 1850s, they in turn began to render the canals obsolete and allowed trade to reach towns that lacked water connections. The canal continued to be used through the early 1870s.

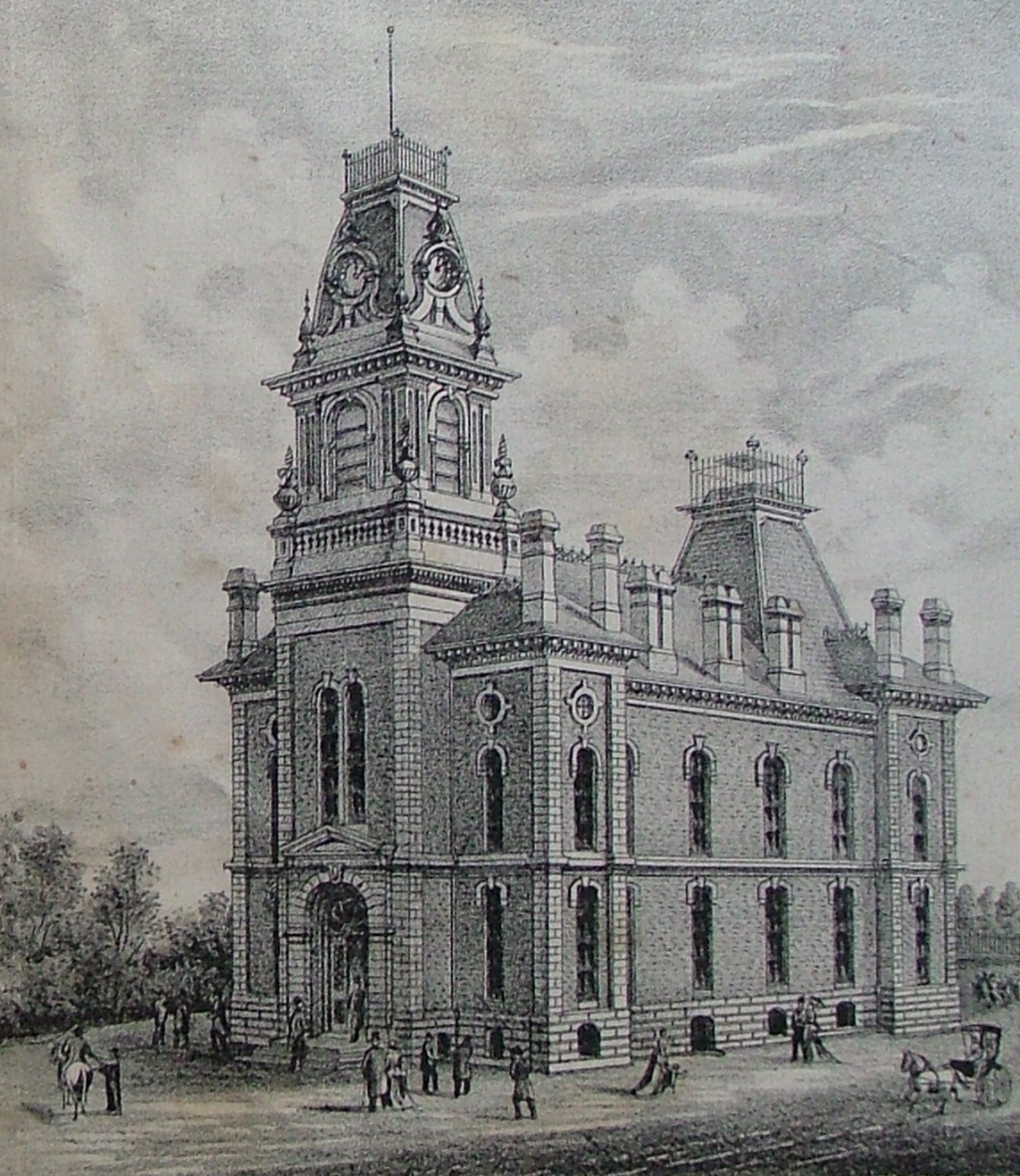
An 1877 drawing of the second purpose-built courthouse

The first trains to run in Warren County operated on portions of the Toledo, Wabash and Western Railway (later the Wabash Railroad) in 1856. The railroad entered the county near Williamsport and was built westward, reaching the western border at State Line City by 1857. West Lebanon was the only other settlement near the railroad's path, but the line bypassed it by about a mile; the town subsequently moved northward to be nearer the station. In 1869 the Indianapolis, Bloomington and Western Railway was built across Mound Township in the southern part of the county. A few years later, in 1872, a branch of the Chicago, Danville and Vincennes Railroad (known as the "Pumpkin Vine Railroad") was built from Bismarck, Illinois, southeast through Warren County; it was built specifically to carry coal from the mines south of Covington. A labor riot at the mines in the late 1870s interrupted the flow of coal, and this combined with the poor financial state of the railroad led to the removal of most of the track by 1880; the remaining portion was removed a few years later. At about this time, in the early 1880s, the Chicago and Indiana Coal Railroad began operating a north–south line through the county. It became part of the Chicago and Eastern Illinois Railroad but was abandoned in 1920 due to financial difficulties; a new company operated the line as the Chicago, Attica and Southern Railroad starting in 1921, but financial problems affected the new company as well and the rails were removed in 1946. Another line, part of the New York Central Railroad, was built through the area in 1903; locally, it ran northeast from Danville into Warren County, then turned north through the small towns of Sloan and Stewart and continued north into Benton County. In the 1970s it became part of Penn Central, then Conrail; operations on the line ceased in the 1990s and the tracks were removed, though a portion running north from Stewart remained and became the Bee Line Railroad which serves the grain processing facility in Stewart.

The Wabash Cannonball was a passenger train that ran on the Wabash Railroad between Detroit, Michigan and Saint Louis, Missouri, starting in 1949. On September 19, 1964, the southbound Cannonball struck a truck loaded with concrete blocks at a crossing in Johnsonville. The driver of the truck was killed instantly, but although the train derailed, no other people died. On the train, the driver and fireman were severely injured when the engine caught fire, and about half of the 50 passengers were injured. Over 1,000 feet (300 m) of track was torn out, and the damage was estimated at over $500,000. The last run of the Cannonball was in 1969.

After peaking in the late 19th century, the county's population declined during the 20th, in common with much of the rural Midwest. The widespread adoption of the automobile in the 1920s undercut small-town businesses, which were threatened further by the Great Depression of the 1930s. World War II and the economic revival of the late 1940s and 1950s drew people to better jobs in growing regional cities, and this further diminished small towns. The population shrank again in the 1980s due largely to the effects of the "farm crisis" of low crop prices, high farmer debt and other economic causes.

The first county fair involved both Fountain and Warren counties and was held in Independence on September 6 and 7, 1853. In following years, the fair was held in Fountain County, and participation by Warren County farmers diminished. In 1856, farmers in the northern part of the county held a fair just east of Pine Village, and this continued each year through 1864. West Lebanon became the next site of the county fair, and it ran successfully through 1883; the fairgrounds just to the northwest of town were well-developed. Later, the fair was held at the county seat of Williamsport, and this continues through the present day; it is now a 4H fair.

One location in the county, near the small town of Kramer, once had an international reputation: the Hotel Mudlavia. Built in 1890 at a cost of $250,000, (Note: A $250,000 capital expense in 1890 would be roughly equivalent to $47,000,000 in 2009.) it drew guests from around the world to nearby natural springs that were said to have healing qualities. People such as James Whitcomb Riley, John L. Sullivan and Harry Lauder are known to have stayed at the hotel, which burned down in 1920. Later, water from the springs was bottled and sold by Indianapolis-based Cameron Springs company, which was acquired by the Perrier Group of America in 2000 for about $10.5 million. As of 2008 the water was still being sold and was marketed under a variety of names.

== Geography ==
Map of Warren County, showing townships and settlements

The Wabash River, coming out of Tippecanoe County to the east, defines the southeastern border of the county; the terrain here is hilly and wooded areas are common. Fountain County lies across the river. By contrast, the northwest region consists mainly of flat prairie farmland; this continues in Benton County to the north. Along the western side of the county is the border with Vermilion County, Illinois. The small southern border is shared with the north end of the similarly named Indiana county of Vermillion. The state capital of Indianapolis lies about 70 miles (110 km) to the southeast.

The highest free-falling waterfall in the state, Williamsport Falls, is located in downtown Williamsport; a stream named Fall Creek flows through the town and falls 90 feet (27 m) over a sandstone ledge less than 1,000 feet (300 m) from the county courthouse. Northeast of Independence is the Black Rock Barrens Nature Preserve, a rare siltstone glade area that, with the adjacent Weiler-Leopold Nature Reserve, supports a diversity of flora including sessile trillium, phlox and wild hyacinth in the moist lowlands and serviceberry, rue anemone, birdsfoot violet and yellow pimpernel on the drier slopes. Big Pine Creek is the county's largest waterway after the Wabash River, and 10.5-mile (16.9 km) segment of it is designated by the Indiana Department of Natural Resources as a state natural and scenic river and passes near Fall Creek Gorge Nature Preserve, an area of cascades and potholes.

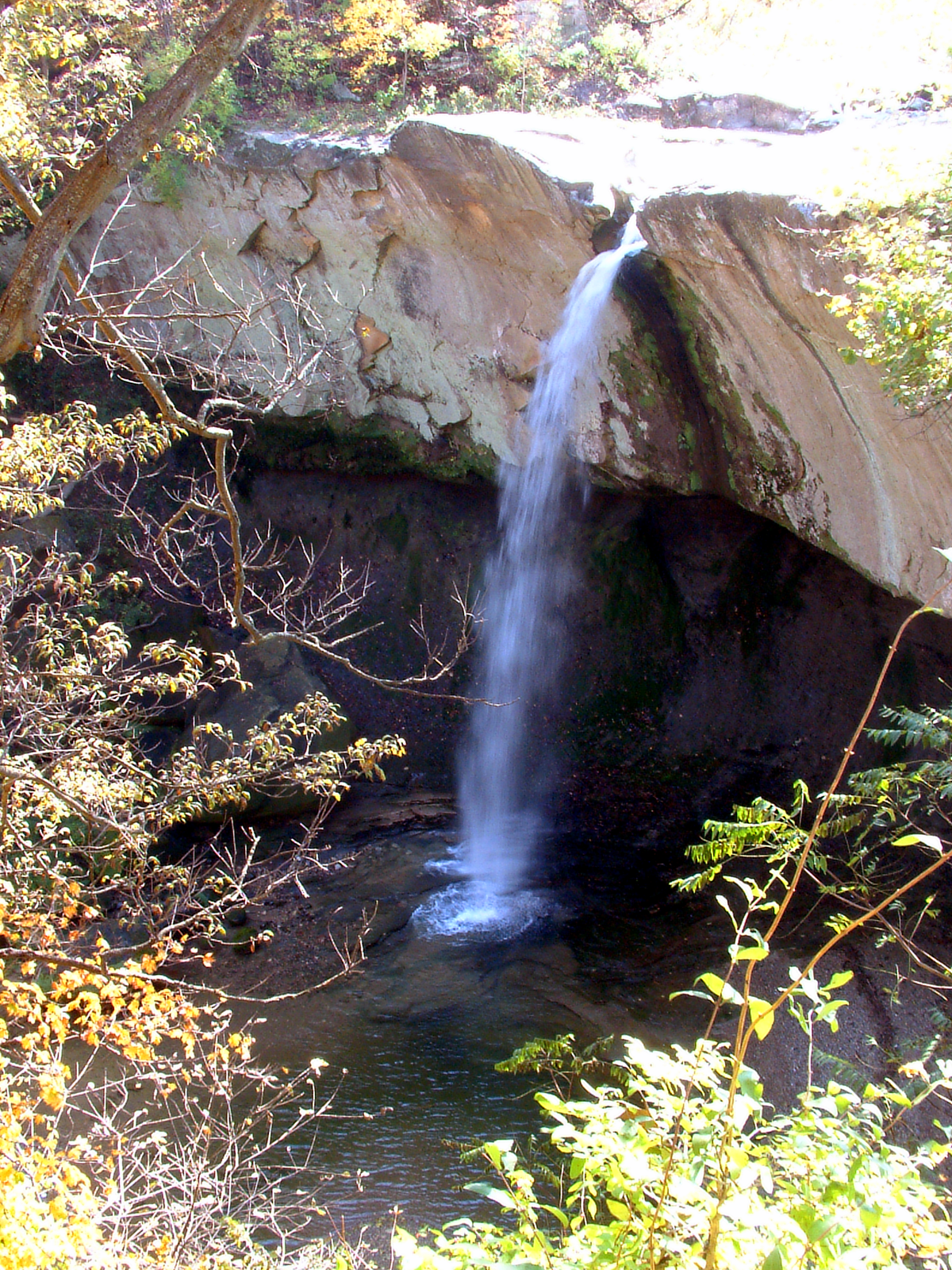
Williamsport Falls

According to the 2010 census, the county has a total area of 366.40 square miles (949.0 km^{2}), of which 364.68 square miles (944.5 km^{2}) (or 99.53%) is land and 1.72 square miles (4.5 km^{2}) (or 0.47%) is water. Elevations in the county range from 480 feet (150 m) above sea level where the Wabash River enters Vermillion County to 830 feet (250 m) in northeastern Prairie Township. The landscape consists mostly of flat or gently sloping moraine overlaying silty and loamy glacial till, except along the Wabash River where sand, gravel, sandstone and shale are exposed. Various forms of silt loam constitute most of the county's soil and are conducive to agriculture. Forests cover about 14% of the county, mainly around major waterways, and consist principally of deciduous hardwoods among which maple–beech and oak–hickory forests are the most common. The only coal mines in the county are located in the southeastern part of Steuben Township, near the Wabash River.

When the county was formed in 1827, it was divided into four townships: Medina, Warren, Pike and Mound. Over the following decades, many changes were made to the township borders and eight new townships were created. Pine and Washington were the first of these, in March 1830; Steuben followed in 1834. Liberty was formed in 1843, Adams in 1848, then Jordan in 1850. Kent and Prairie were the last to be created, in 1864. As of 2010, Prairie Township, at 5.4 inhabitants per square mile (2.1/km^{2}), has the lowest population density; it covers more area than any of the other townships—nearly 50 square miles (130 km^{2})—and contains no incorporated towns. The highest density is in Washington Township, which has 120 inhabitants per square mile (46/km^{2}); it includes Williamsport, the county's largest town, and covers only about 20 square miles (52 km^{2}).

There are four incorporated towns in the county. The largest is Williamsport, which is on the western banks of the Wabash River in the eastern part of the county, just downstream of Attica (which is on the east side of the river in Fountain County); in 2010, its population was 1,898—nearly one-fourth of the county's total. West Lebanon is about 5 miles (8.0 km) west of Williamsport on State Road 28, with a population of 723. The town of Pine Village lies about 11 miles (18 km) to the north of Williamsport where State Road 55 intersects State Road 26, near the northern edge of the county; 217 people live in Pine Village. State Line City is in the southwestern part of the county and shares its western border with the Illinois state line. A small Illinois community named Illiana lies immediately on the west side of the county road which runs along the state border (and which is also a street between the two communities). State Line City is the smallest of the towns, with a population of 143.

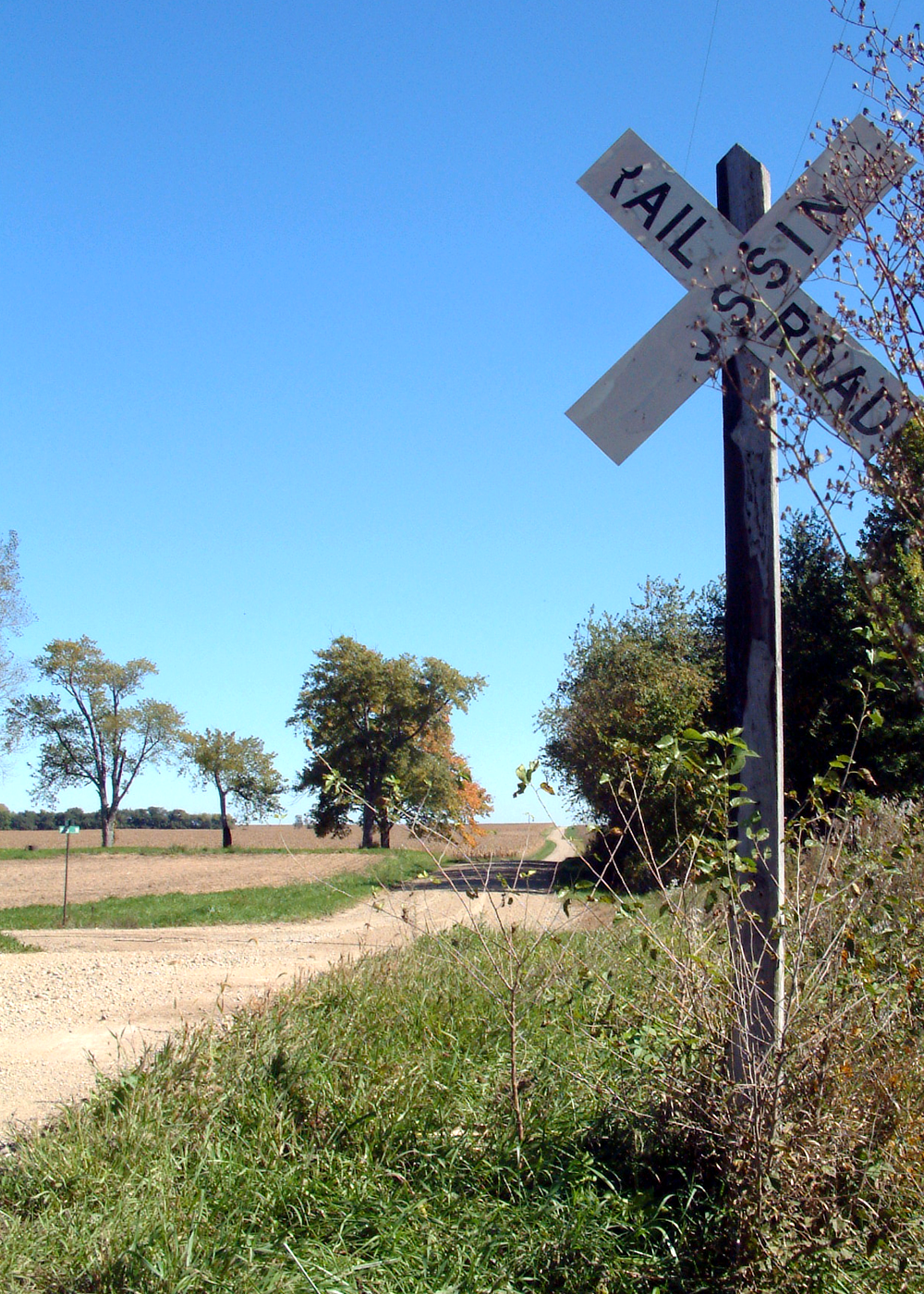
Railroad crossing sign at Sloan

In addition to the incorporated towns, there are over a dozen small unincorporated communities in Warren County that are historical centers of activity. Now they consist mostly of dwellings, though several have churches and some still have small businesses. The small settlements of Hedrick, Pence and Stewart are in Jordan Township; Stewart consists of a grain processing facility and a single residence. In Steuben Township, Johnsonville has a church and a handful of residences. Marshfield has an automotive body repair shop, a grain elevator and a church. Independence, platted in 1832, is located on the site of a trading post set up by Zachariah Cicott. He is buried in a cemetery in Warren Township, just north of town. The township included the small settlement of Winthrop. Liberty Township has three unincorporated communities: Carbondale, Judyville and Kramer (near the site of the Mudlavia Hotel). Several townships contain only a single settlement. Foster is the only one in Mound Township and has a motel and several houses. In the northeast corner of the county, Green Hill is Medina Township's only settlement. Tab is the only settlement in Prairie Township; most of this township is agricultural, and a large grain processing facility is Tab's only remaining business. Pine Township's only community is Rainsville.

Some settlements did not survive. The river town of Baltimore thrived and was a major center of trade until the river was overshadowed by the railroad for purposes of trade and transportation; a single house, built long after the town's heyday, is all that remains. Warrenton had a promising start as the first county seat, but it began to wane after the seat moved, and today no trace is left. Chesapeake was the first settlement in Steuben Township, but it faded away so early that even an 1883 county history has little to say on the subject. Brisco was never large, though it did have a school house from the 1850s through the 1920s. It likewise disappeared by the end of the 20th century. Chatterton had a school, a store and a post office, but it has disappeared even though the name continues to appear on maps. Other communities were planned but did not develop. Dresser was never much more than a collection of houses, though it did have a post office for a few years around the turn of the 20th century. The settlements of Kickapoo, Locust Grove, Sloan and Walnut Grove were similar in this respect. Point Pleasant never developed much beyond the founder's residence and a liquor store, and was later described as a "paper town".

Overview of townships
Township	Established year	Area mi^{2}	Area km^{2}	Population 2010	Places (incorporated in bold)	Extinct places
Adams	1848	27.03	70.01	512	**Pine Village**	Chatterton
Jordan	1850	40.53	104.98	247	Hedrick, Pence, Stewart	
Kent	1864	14.10	36.51	428	**State Line City**	
Liberty	1843	44.00	113.95	896	Carbondale, Judyville, Kramer	
Medina	1827	27.15	70.33	457	Green Hill	
Mound	1827	16.79	43.48	418	Foster	Baltimore
Pike	1827	17.57	45.51	1,221	**West Lebanon**	
Pine	1830	36.09	93.48	481	Rainsville	Brisco, Point Pleasant
Prairie	1864	47.80	123.81	257	Tab	Locust Grove, Walnut Grove
Steuben	1834	39.60	102.57	487	Johnsonville, Marshfield	Chesapeake, Dresser, Sloan
Warren	1827	36.42	94.33	806	Independence, Winthrop	Warrenton, Kickapoo
Washington	1830	19.51	50.53	2,298	**Williamsport**	
Warren County	1827	366.60	949.49	8,508		

== Climate and weather ==
Indiana

Climate chart (precipitation, max. and min. temperature)
J	F	M	A	M	J	J	A	S	O	N	D
2.5 18 34	2.3 21 40	3.4 31 51	3.9 40 62	4.5 50 73	4.2 59 82	4.2 63 85	3.9 61 83	3.1 53 77	3 42 65	3.4 33 51	3.1 23 39
- █ Average max. and min. temperatures in °F
- █ Precipitation totals in inches
- Source: Indiana State Climate Office
Metric conversion
J	F	M	A	M	J	J	A	S	O	N	D
63 −8 1	58 −6 4	85 −1 10	99 4 17	113 10 23	106 15 28	107 17 30	99 16 28	79 12 25	77 6 19	87 1 11	80 −5 4
- █ Average max. and min. temperatures in °C
- █ Precipitation totals in mm

Warren County is in the humid continental climate region of the United States, as is most of Indiana. Its Köppen climate classification is Dfa, meaning that it is cold, has no dry season, and has a hot summer. From 1971 to 2000, average temperatures in Indiana have ranged from a low of 26 °F (−3 °C) in January to a high of 74.3 °F (23.5 °C) in July, although a record low of −33 °F (−36 °C) was recorded in 1887 and a record high of 116 °F (47 °C) was recorded in 1936. Average monthly precipitation has ranged from 2.27 inches (58 mm) inches in February to 4.46 inches (113 mm) inches in May.

On April 17, 1922, a tornado touched down in Warren County. The town of Hedrick in southern Jordan Township was almost entirely destroyed, along with other buildings in the vicinity of the town, and several people were killed. From 1950 through 2009, ten tornadoes were reported in Warren County; none resulted in any deaths or injuries, but the total estimated property damage was over $3 million.

Warren County was affected by the Great Blizzard of 1978 which covered several states and was the worst blizzard on record for Indiana; in late January, a record of snowfall of over 20 inches (51 cm) fell locally, and high winds resulted in snowdrifts as high as 10 feet (3.0 m). Local schools were closed for up to seventeen days, and some residents were snowbound for as many as five days.

== Transportation ==
There are no interstate highways in Warren County, although Interstate 74 passes less than half a mile (800m) from the southern border. About 20 miles (32 km) of federal highways and 86 miles (138 km) of state highways cross the county, as do about 550 miles (890 km) of county roads. Of these, roughly a third are paved and the rest are topped with crushed gravel or packed dirt.

U.S. Route 41 enters from Benton County to the north and runs through the center of Warren County, veering to the east and crossing the Wabash River between Williamsport and Attica before continuing south. U.S. Route 136 passes through the far southern part of the county on its route between Covington and Danville, Illinois.

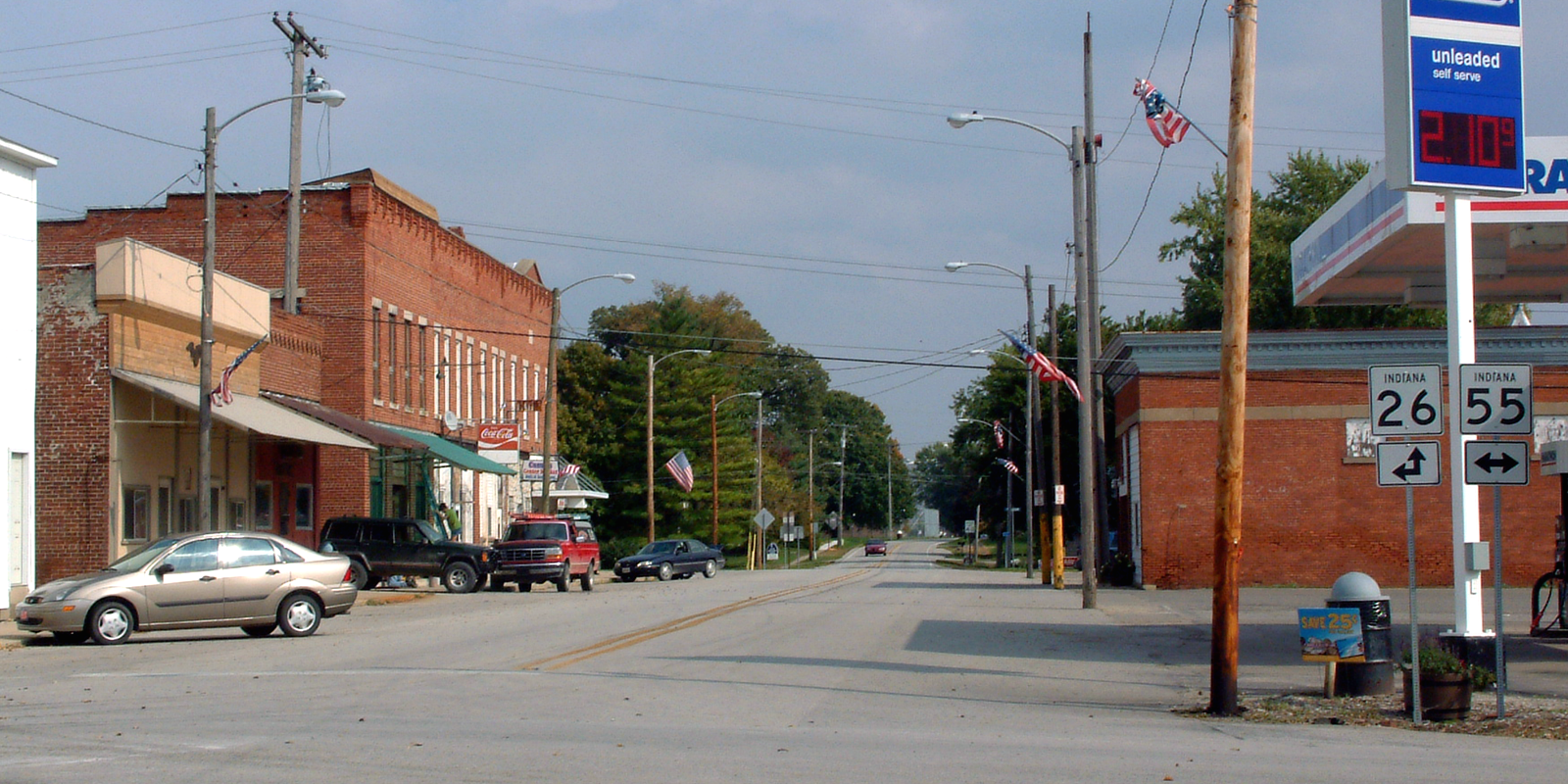
The corner of State Roads 26 and 55 in Pine Village

In the northern part of the county, Indiana State Road 26 begins at the Illinois border and passes through the town of Pine Village, where it intersects State Road 55 on its way from Oxford in the north to Attica in the south; State Road 26 continues east through Lafayette and on to the Ohio border. Likewise, State Road 28 runs across the state from Illinois to Ohio; it connects West Lebanon with Williamsport and continues east through Attica.

The four-lane divided State Road 63 runs south from its northern terminus at U.S. Route 41 near the center of the county; both reach Terre Haute about 60 miles (97 km) to the south, but while Route 41 crosses to the east side of the river, State Road 63 remains on the west side. Construction on the current State Road 63, which replaced the older two-lane road and streamlined its route, began in the late 1960s and was completed by the early 1980s. The current two-lane State Road 263 is a part of the original route of State Road 63 and forms a 13-mile (21 km) business route that leaves its parent route, passes through West Lebanon and along the river, then rejoins its parent near the south edge of the county. A small portion of State Road 352 lies in the far northwestern corner of the county, following the county and state border north from State Road 26 for only about 1 mile (1.6 km) before leaving Warren County and entering Benton County on its way through the small town of Ambia.

A Norfolk Southern Railway route connecting Danville, Illinois, with the city of Lafayette is the county's busiest rail line, carrying about 45 freight trains each day. It enters Warren County at State Line City and passes northeast through the communities of Johnsonville, Marshfield, West Lebanon and Williamsport before exiting the county at Attica. Two short-line railroads operate less frequently. The Bee Line Railroad is used principally for agricultural transportation and runs approximately 10 miles (16 km) from Stewart north through Tab and into southern Benton County where it joins the Kankakee, Beaverville and Southern. The 6-mile (10 km) Vermilion Valley Railroad serves the Flex-N-Gate factory near Covington and runs west from the plant through the town of Foster to meet a CSX line in Danville.

The nearest airport is the small Vermilion Regional Airport, located 4 nautical miles (7.4 km; 4.6 mi) northeast of Danville, Illinois. Purdue University Airport is Indiana's second busiest airport and is operated by Purdue University in neighboring Tippecanoe County to the northeast. Indianapolis International Airport is located about 90 miles (140 km) to the southeast.

== Economy ==
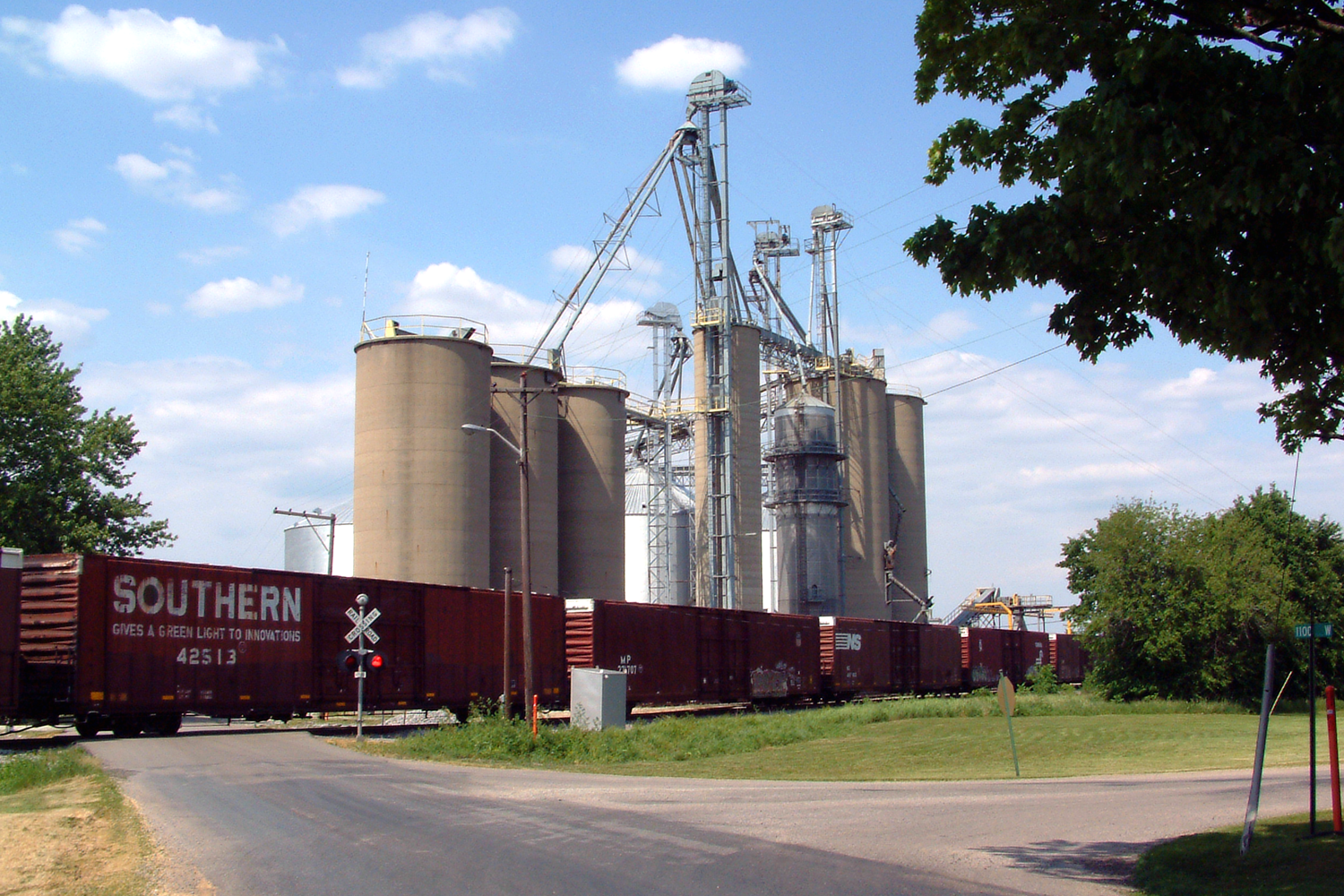
A Norfolk Southern train passing the grain elevators in State Line

Warren County's economy is supported by a labor force of approximately 4,815 workers with an unemployment rate in July 2010 of 8.8%. Farming is a significant part of the economy, employing approximately 14% of the county's workers and supporting grain elevators in most towns. In some cases, the elevator is the town's only formal business. The county's farmland is highly productive and is among the top 10% of Indiana counties in terms of crop yield per acre. In 2009, 94,700 acres (38,300 ha) of corn was planted and 93,100 acres (37,700 ha) acres harvested, yielding an average of 187 bushels per acre (11.7 metric tons per hectare) for a total corn production of 17.4 million bushels (441,980 metric tons). Approximately 72,000 acres (29,000 ha) of soybeans were planted, yielding 55 bushels per acre (3.7 metric tons per hectare) for a total of 3.96 million bushels (107,774 metric tons). Farmers also grew small amounts of hay (3,700 acres (1,500 ha)) and winter wheat, and held 3,600 head of cattle. Roughly 86% of the county's 234,413 acres (94,864 ha) is cropland.

About 14% of the labor force works in the government sector for state and county services and schools; in the non-government sector, manufacturing is the largest industry at about 17% of the labor force. The county has several industrial employers. Flex-N-Gate, an automobile parts assembly and warehouse facility, occupies the 750-acre (300 ha) former Olin factory complex west of Covington. In Williamsport, industry includes TMF Center, which manufactures parts for construction equipment and trucking; GL Technologies, which procures industrial tooling; and Kuri-Tec, which manufactures industrial hoses and accessories. Tru-Flex Metal Hose in West Lebanon has made stripwound and corrugated flexible metal hose since 1962; Dyna-Fab, also in West Lebanon, specializes in metal stampings and weldments. St. Vincent Hospital and a nursing home in Williamsport are also important local employers; 9.8% of the county's jobs relate to health care and social services.

Larger local economies in the more populous counties to the east and west offer additional employment and commerce, particularly in the cities of Lafayette and West Lafayette in Tippecanoe County and the city of Danville in Vermilion County, Illinois.

Electricity in the county comes from three providers. Duke Energy and the Warren County Rural Electric Membership Cooperative (REMC) serve most of the county, while the northern edge of the county receives power from NIPSCO.

== Education and health care ==
There are three school districts with territory in the county: Metropolitan School District of Warren County, Benton Community School Corporation, and Covington Community School Corporation. The four public schools within the county limits are administered by the Warren County Metropolitan school district. There is one junior–senior school in that system: Seeger Memorial Junior-Senior High School north of West Lebanon, which was built in 1957 as part of the school consolidation effort. Seeger had an enrollment of 557 students during the 2014–15 school year and graduated 90 students the previous year. Warren Central Elementary School is co-located with Seeger and served 305 students during the 2014–15 school year, while Williamsport Elementary School served 168 students and Pine Village Elementary School served 117 students.

There are no colleges or universities within Warren County, but there are several in nearby counties. Purdue University is a major undergraduate and graduate land-grant university in West Lafayette, approximately 20 miles (32 km) northeast in Tippecanoe County. The University of Illinois at Urbana–Champaign, another major research land-grant university, is about 50 miles (80 km) to the west. Ivy Tech Community College of Indiana has 23 campuses throughout the state; the closest to Warren County is in Lafayette. Danville Area Community College is a public two-year college located in neighboring Vermilion County, Illinois, about 20 miles (32 km) southwest of Williamsport. Indiana State University is located about 60 miles south of West Lebanon, in Terre Haute, IN. ISU is one of the Princeton Review's "Best in the Midwest," and holds Carnegie classification as a research/doctoral university.

The towns of Williamsport and West Lebanon both have public libraries. The Williamsport-Washington Township Public Library was built in 2002 and replaced the town's 1917 Carnegie library; the West Lebanon-Pike Township Public Library is housed in the original 1916 Carnegie building, which was expanded in 2006.

The county's single hospital is St. Vincent Williamsport Hospital, a 16-bed acute care facility operated by Indianapolis-based St. Vincent Health. The hospital includes a 24-hour emergency medical service and ambulance service. Williamsport also has a nursing home that provides health care and rehabilitation services primarily for seniors.

== Notable people ==
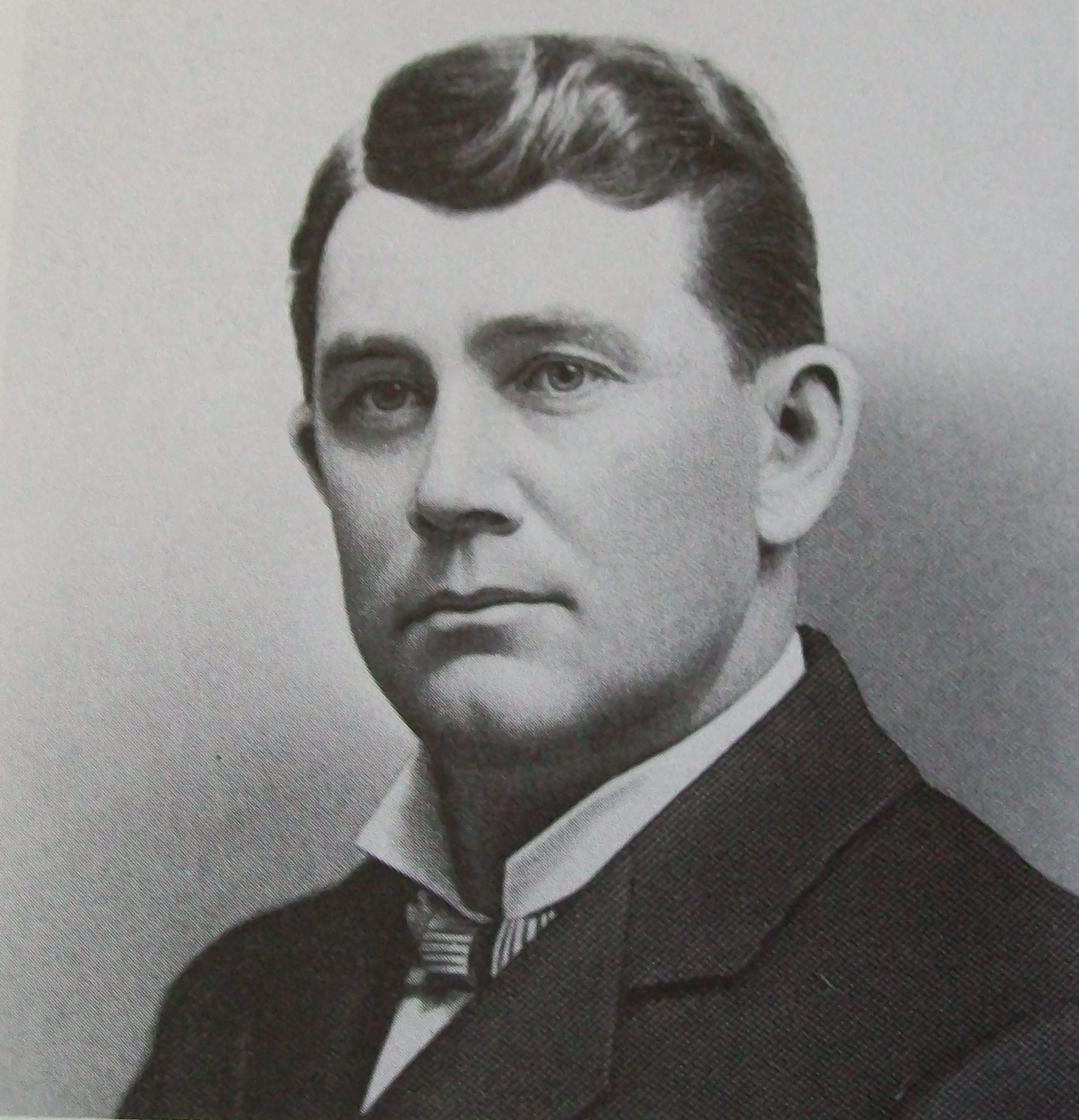
J. Frank Hanly in 1908

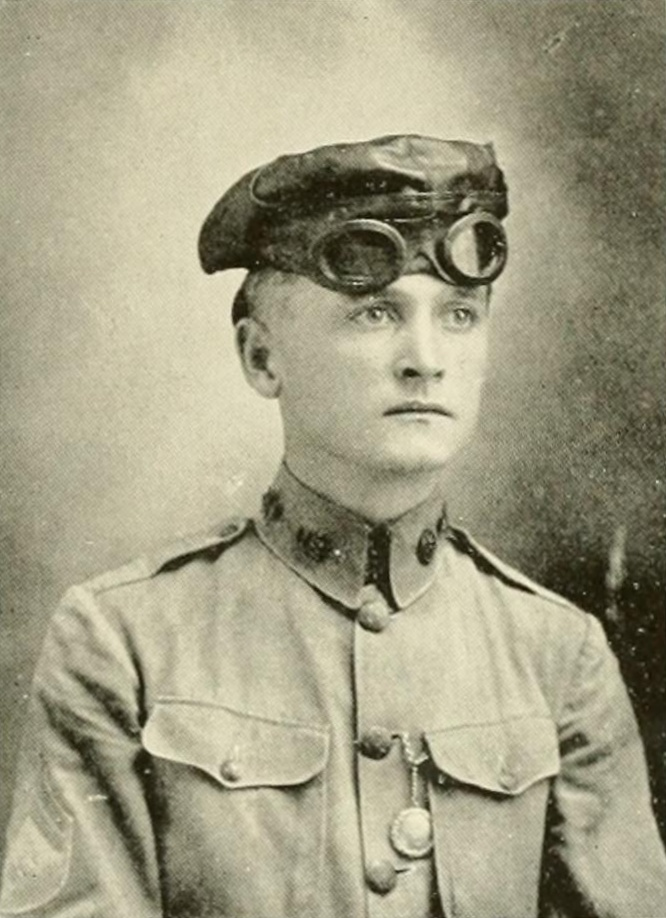
Vernon Burge in 1913

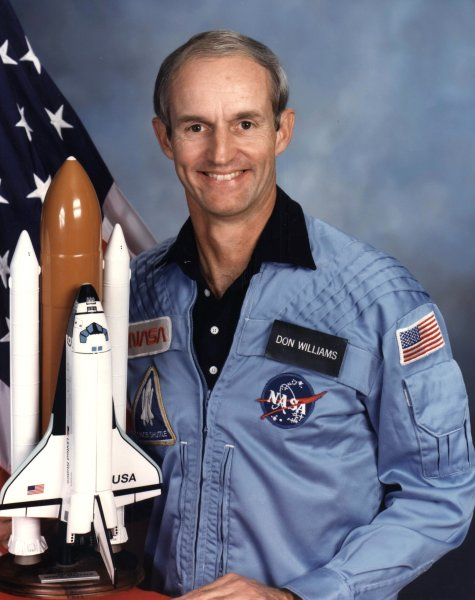
Donald E. Williams

George D. Wagner was raised on a farm near Green Hill in Medina Township, where his family moved when he was four years old. As an adult he became a prosperous farmer; in 1856 he was elected to the Indiana House of Representatives, and he later served in the Indiana Senate. He fought in the Civil War on the Union side and was promoted to brigadier general in 1863. After the war, he moved to Williamsport and practiced law; he died in 1869 at age 39 and is buried in Armstrong Cemetery north of Green Hill, near the farm where he was raised.

James Frank Hanly was born in Champaign County, Illinois in 1863. He moved to Warren County in 1879 and worked as a school teacher from 1881 to 1889, when he joined a local law office. He entered politics and served as Governor of Indiana from 1905 to 1909. He was a strong supporter of prohibition and lectured widely on the subject after his time as governor. While traveling to such a lecture in 1920, he died in an automobile accident in Ohio and is buried at Hillside Cemetery on the northeast side of Williamsport.

Fremont Goodwine was born in West Lafayette in 1857. He attended Purdue University and was part of the original freshman class in 1874, graduating in 1878. He became a teacher, and later lived in Williamsport and served as the superintendent of education for Warren County, starting in 1887. He was elected to a seat in the state senate in 1897 and continued there for 12 years; he served as President pro tem of the senate for one session. He died in 1956 at the age of 99.

Albert Lee Stephens Sr. was born in State Line City in 1874. He studied law in California and set up a private practice there, and later served in several legal positions before becoming a judge in 1919. In 1935 he was nominated by Franklin D. Roosevelt to serve as a United States District Court judge in California. Two years later Roosevelt nominated him to a new seat as judge in the United States Court of Appeals for the Ninth Circuit, and in 1957 he became chief judge. He died while still serving in 1965, at age 91.

Vernon Burge attended school in West Lebanon, where his father worked as a blacksmith. After graduation, he enlisted in the United States Army in 1907 and was assigned to the Balloon Attachment of the Signal Corps. He later became part of the first United States military aviation unit, and in 1912 he became the first American enlisted man to be certified as a military pilot.

Like George Wagner, Donald E. Williams grew up in Green Hill. He studied mechanical engineering at Purdue University, served as a pilot during the Vietnam War, then as a test pilot, and became a NASA astronaut in 1979; he flew on two Space Shuttle missions in the 1980s.

Stephanie White-McCarty attended Seeger Memorial High School and was named 1995 Indiana Miss Basketball after setting a state scoring record while playing on the Seeger team. She went on to be part of Purdue University's first NCAA women's basketball championship team in 1999, then began a five-year career in the Women's National Basketball Association. She is currently the head coach of the Vanderbilt Commodores women's basketball team.

== Media ==
The first newspaper in the county was The Wabash Commercial, which was printed in Williamsport and started publication in the 1850s. A new owner changed the name to The Warren Republican in 1854, the same year that the Republican Party was formed. It had several different owners until 1870; it was then published by a single owner for the next 40 years. Another paper called The Warren Review was started in 1891 and also had several owners until the two papers combined in 1914 as The Review Republican, which is now billed as "Warren County's only newspaper". It is now owned by Community Media Group which produces newspapers and other print distribution products in six states. West Lebanon also had several newspapers which began publication around the time of the Civil War. The most recent was The Gazette, which was printed from the late 1800s into the early 1900s; before this there were several other papers printed under several different names as owners changed. As of 1912, Pine Village had a newspaper called the Sentinel-News. The Neighbor is a weekly paper serving Fountain and Warren counties.

The nearest major television market area is based in Indianapolis. The smaller Lafayette market area is closer and includes several broadcast stations that can be received in much of Warren County; the Champaign, Illinois market area is closer to the southwestern portions of the county and is also in broadcast range. There are no radio stations based in Warren County, but several nearby areas have AM and FM stations that are in broadcast range. This includes Lafayette and Terre Haute in Indiana, and Danville and Champaign-Urbana in Illinois.

== Government ==
United States presidential election results for Warren County, Indiana
Year	Republican		Democratic		Third party(ies)	
Year	No.	%	No.	%	No.	%
1888	1,847	63.32%	1,017	34.86%	53	1.82%
1892	1,849	63.28%	979	33.50%	94	3.22%
1896	2,045	64.27%	1,100	34.57%	37	1.16%
1900	2,167	64.59%	1,117	33.29%	71	2.12%
1904	2,208	66.77%	964	29.15%	135	4.08%
1908	2,092	65.09%	1,045	32.51%	77	2.40%
1912	1,183	41.36%	872	30.49%	805	28.15%
1916	1,823	61.67%	1,011	34.20%	122	4.13%
1920	3,337	70.89%	1,311	27.85%	59	1.25%
1924	3,035	69.66%	1,150	26.39%	172	3.95%
1928	2,644	68.57%	1,188	30.81%	24	0.62%
1932	2,223	48.92%	2,256	49.65%	65	1.43%
1936	2,780	55.10%	2,242	44.44%	23	0.46%
1940	2,999	60.71%	1,927	39.01%	14	0.28%
1944	2,870	64.73%	1,555	35.07%	9	0.20%
1948	2,444	63.17%	1,391	35.95%	34	0.88%
1952	3,191	70.16%	1,332	29.29%	25	0.55%
1956	2,979	67.61%	1,408	31.96%	19	0.43%
1960	2,870	64.29%	1,574	35.26%	20	0.45%
1964	2,154	48.68%	2,261	51.10%	10	0.23%
1968	2,475	57.00%	1,375	31.67%	492	11.33%
1972	2,746	69.96%	1,164	29.66%	15	0.38%
1976	2,377	55.13%	1,906	44.20%	29	0.67%
1980	2,665	64.11%	1,287	30.96%	205	4.93%
1984	2,525	65.38%	1,309	33.89%	28	0.73%
1988	2,243	59.04%	1,542	40.59%	14	0.37%
1992	1,601	40.00%	1,367	34.15%	1,035	25.86%
1996	1,678	46.01%	1,394	38.22%	575	15.77%
2000	2,218	58.86%	1,471	39.04%	79	2.10%
2004	2,565	64.77%	1,356	34.24%	39	0.98%
2008	2,166	54.18%	1,755	43.90%	77	1.93%
2012	2,377	62.55%	1,324	34.84%	99	2.61%
2016	2,898	73.31%	839	21.22%	216	5.46%
2020	3,401	76.03%	974	21.78%	98	2.19%
2024	3,402	77.85%	898	20.55%	70	1.60%

The county government is a constitutional body granted specific powers by the Constitution of Indiana and the Indiana Code. The seven-member county council is the legislative branch of the county government and controls all spending and revenue collection. Representatives are elected from county districts. The council members serve four-year terms and are responsible for setting salaries, the annual budget and special spending. The council also has limited authority to impose local taxes, in the form of an income and property tax that is subject to state level approval, excise taxes and service taxes. In 2010, the county budgeted approximately $2.2 million for the district's schools and $2.8 million for other county operations and services, for a total annual budget of approximately $5 million.

The executive body of the county consists of a board of commissioners. The three commissioners are elected from county districts in staggered four-year terms. The commissioners are charged with executing the acts legislated by the council, collecting revenue, and managing the day-to-day functions of the county government.

The Warren Circuit Court serves as a trial court of general jurisdiction. It hears original disputes in civil, criminal, probate, juvenile, traffic and small claims cases. In most cases, court decisions can be appealed to the Indiana Court of Appeals or Supreme Court. The judge is elected to a term of six years, and is assisted by a clerk who is elected to a term of four years.

The county has several other elected offices, including sheriff, coroner, auditor, treasurer, recorder, surveyor and circuit court clerk. Each of these elected officers serves a term of four years and oversees a different part of county government. Members elected to county government positions are required to declare party affiliations and be residents of the county.

Each of the townships has a trustee who administers rural fire protection and ambulance service, provides poor relief and manages cemetery care, among other duties. The trustee is assisted in these duties by a three-member township board. The trustees and board members are elected to four-year terms.

Based on 2000 census results, Warren County is part of Indiana's 8th congressional district. Most of the county is in the 38th Indiana Senate district; the exceptions are Warren and Washington townships, which are in the 23rd. The western portion of the county is in the 42nd Indiana House of Representatives district; the eastern townships of Adams, Medina and Warren are in the 26th.

== Demographics ==
Historical population
Census	Pop.	Note	%±
1830	2,861		—
1840	5,656		97.7%
1850	7,387		30.6%
1860	10,057		36.1%
1870	10,204		1.5%
1880	11,497		12.7%
1890	10,955		−4.7%
1900	11,371		3.8%
1910	10,899		−4.2%
1920	9,699		−11.0%
1930	9,167		−5.5%
1940	9,055		−1.2%
1950	8,535		−5.7%
1960	8,545		0.1%
1970	8,705		1.9%
1980	8,976		3.1%
1990	8,176		−8.9%
2000	8,419		3.0%
2010	8,508		1.1%
2020	8,440		−0.8%
2025 (est.)	8,474	▲	0.4%
U.S. Decennial Census; 1790–1960 1900–1990; 1990–2000 2010–2020

=== Racial and ethnic composition ===
Warren County, Indiana – Racial and ethnic composition Note: the US Census treats Hispanic/Latino as an ethnic category. This table excludes Latinos from the racial categories and assigns them to a separate category. Hispanics/Latinos may be of any race.
Race / Ethnicity (NH = Non-Hispanic)	Pop 1980	Pop 1990	Pop 2000	Pop 2010	Pop 2020	% 1980	% 1990	% 2000	% 2010	% 2020
White alone (NH)	8,920	8,121	8,318	8,321	8,018	99.38%	99.33%	98.80%	97.80%	95.00%
Black or African American alone (NH)	3	1	7	10	7	0.03%	0.01%	0.08%	0.12%	0.08%
Native American or Alaska Native alone (NH)	10	16	12	13	7	0.11%	0.20%	0.14%	0.15%	0.08%
Asian alone (NH)	8	15	15	36	26	0.09%	0.18%	0.18%	0.42%	0.31%
Native Hawaiian or Pacific Islander alone (NH)	x	x	2	6	0	x	x	0.02%	0.07%	0.00%
Other race alone (NH)	6	0	0	3	11	0.07%	0.00%	0.00%	0.04%	0.13%
Mixed race or Multiracial (NH)	x	x	28	49	178	x	x	0.33%	0.58%	2.11%
Hispanic or Latino (any race)	29	23	37	70	193	0.32%	0.28%	0.44%	0.82%	2.29%
Total	8,976	8,176	8,419	8,508	8,440	100.00%	100.00%	100.00%	100.00%	100.00%

=== 2020 census ===
As of the 2020 census, the county had a population of 8,440. The median age was 44.1 years. 22.7% of residents were under the age of 18 and 20.5% of residents were 65 years of age or older. For every 100 females there were 102.4 males, and for every 100 females age 18 and over there were 101.4 males age 18 and over.

The racial makeup of the county was 95.5% White, 0.1% Black or African American, 0.1% American Indian and Alaska Native, 0.3% Asian, <0.1% Native Hawaiian and Pacific Islander, 0.9% from some other race, and 3.0% from two or more races. Hispanic or Latino residents of any race comprised 2.3% of the population.

<0.1% of residents lived in urban areas, while 100.0% lived in rural areas.

There were 3,333 households in the county, of which 30.5% had children under the age of 18 living in them. Of all households, 58.6% were married-couple households, 16.9% were households with a male householder and no spouse or partner present, and 18.8% were households with a female householder and no spouse or partner present. About 23.2% of all households were made up of individuals and 11.4% had someone living alone who was 65 years of age or older.

There were 3,659 housing units, of which 8.9% were vacant. Among occupied housing units, 81.2% were owner-occupied and 18.8% were renter-occupied. The homeowner vacancy rate was 1.7% and the rental vacancy rate was 9.6%.

=== 2010 census ===
As of the 2010 United States census, there were 8,508 people, 3,337 households, and 2,416 families residing in the county. The population density was 23.3 inhabitants per square mile (9.0/km^{2}). There were 3,680 housing units at an average density of 10.1 per square mile (3.9/km^{2}). The racial makeup of the county was 98.3% white, 0.1% black or African American, 0.2% Native American, 0.4% Asian, 0.1% Pacific Islander, 0.2% from other races, and 0.7% from two or more races. Those of Hispanic or Latino origin made up 0.8% of the population. In terms of ancestry, 27.7% were German, 11.3% were English, 10.9% were Irish, and 9.2% were American.

There were 3,337 households, of which 31.7% had children under the age of 18 living with them, 59.4% were married couples living together, 8.3% had a female householder with no husband present, and 27.6% were non-families. 23.1% of all households were made up of individuals, and 11.0% had someone living alone who was 65 years of age or older. The average household size was 2.52 and the average family size was 2.94. The median age was 42.4 years.

The median income for a household in the county was $49,238, and the median income for a family was $57,990. Males had a median income of $46,731 versus $31,064 for females. The per capita income for the county was $23,670. About 6.9% of families and 8.8% of the population were below the poverty line, including 13.9% of those under age 18 and 6.3% of those age 65 or over.

== See also ==
- National Register of Historic Places listings in Warren County, Indiana
