= The Review Republican =

Newspaper

- The 16 November 2006 front page of The Review Republican
- Type: Weekly newspaper
- Format: Broadsheet
- Owner(s): Community Media Group
- Publisher: Twin States Publishing
- Founded: 1854
- Website: reviewrepublican.com

The Review Republican is a weekly newspaper serving Warren, Fountain and Benton counties in Indiana. It is published weekly, on Thursdays.

== History ==
The Review Republican was formed on October 22, 1914, as a merger between two other newspapers — the Warren Review and the Warren Republican.

- The Warren Republican began on December 6, 1854, a continuation of the earlier Wabash Commercial which was a Whig Party journal and Williamsport's first newspaper when it began in 1848.
- The Warren Review was a Republican Party-oriented journal in Williamsport first published on January 1, 1891, by Thomas A. Clifton, who formerly operated the Veedersburg Reporter in Fountain County, Indiana.

The first editor of the new, consolidated paper was Review owner John H. Stephenson. The paper was purchased around 1921 by Isaac W. Cripe, whose son Herbert became sole owner on October 4, 1941, upon his father's death. Herbert's wife Florence later became coeditor and copublisher. On April 1, 1980, the Cripes sold the paper to Fall Creek Publications, Inc., headed by Arthur A. Allen. Allen sold the paper to Mary Ann Akers in 1981. Akers owned the paper until 2003, when she sold out to Community Media Group.
