= Winthrop, Indiana =

- Unincorporated community
- Location within Warren County, Indiana Location within Indiana Location within the United States
- Coordinates: 40°22′12″N 87°14′02″W
- Country: United States
- State: Indiana
- County: Warren
- Township: Warren
- Founded: 1884
- Founder: Jacob M. Rhode
- Elevation: 682 ft (208 m)
- Time zone: UTC-5 (Eastern (EST))
  - Summer (DST): UTC-4 (EDT)
- ZIP code: 47993
- Area code: 765
- GNIS feature ID: 446200

Winthrop is a small unincorporated community in Warren Township, Warren County, in the U.S. state of Indiana.

== History ==
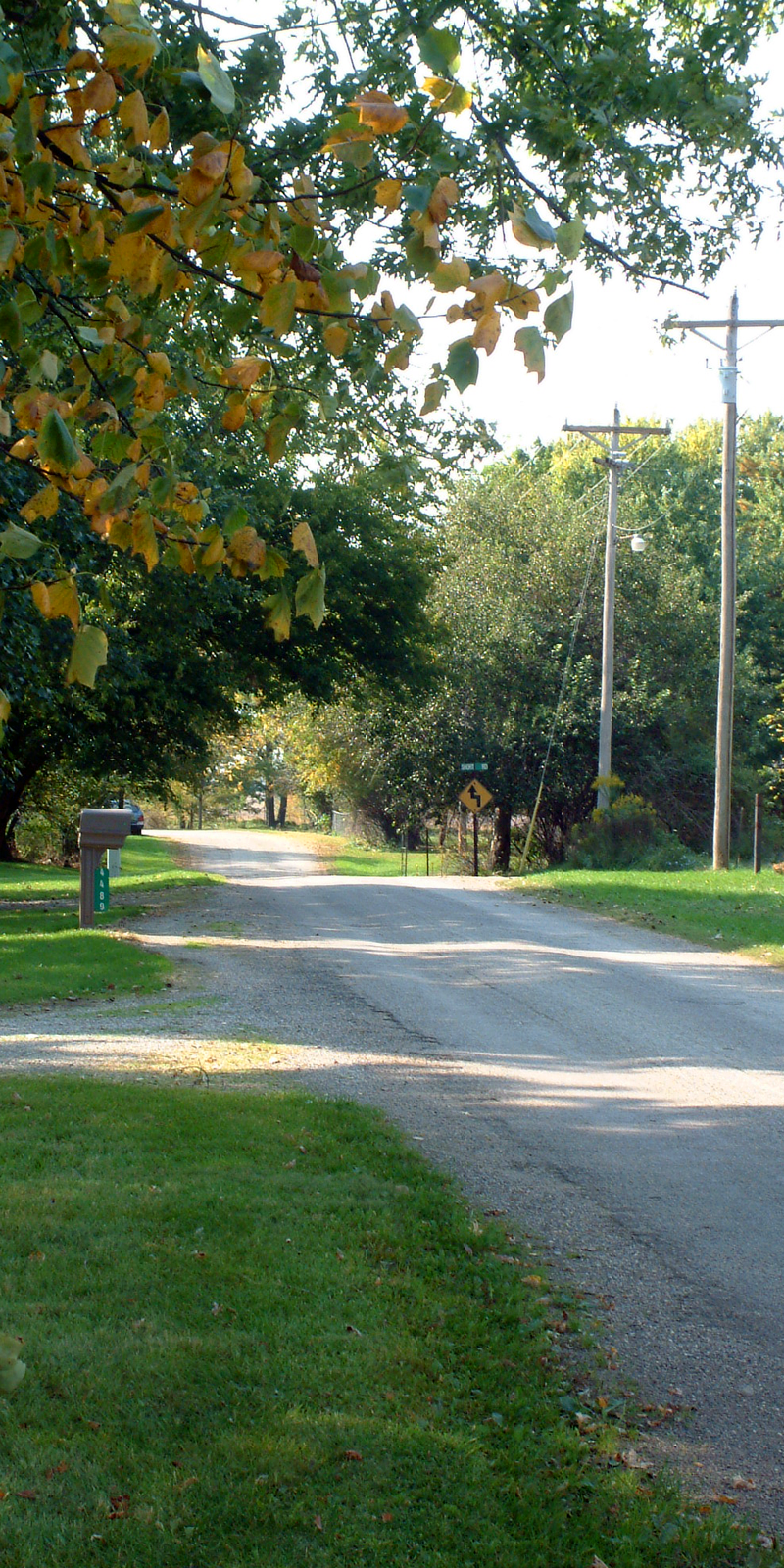
Looking west into Winthrop

Winthrop was platted on March 3, 1884, by farmer Jacob Morgan Rhode (d. February 8, 1919); the name probably comes from a personal name. A north–south line of the Chicago and Eastern Illinois Railroad known as the "Coal Road" served the town in the late 19th and early 20th centuries. Operated after 1922 as the Chicago, Attica and Southern Railroad, it deteriorated in the 1930s and was scrapped around 1945. Few traces of the route remain.

== Geography ==
Winthrop is located about 1.5 miles (2.4 km) east of Indiana State Road 55 and about 6.5 miles (10.5 km) north of the county seat of Williamsport, at an elevation of approximately 680 feet. The West Fork of Kickapoo Creek flows to the west and south of town.
