= Prairie Township, Warren County, Indiana =

Prairie Township
- Township
- Location of Prairie Township in Warren County

- Location of Indiana in the United States
- Coordinates: 40°26′28″N 87°27′23″W
- Country: United States
- State: Indiana
- County: Warren
- Established: 1864

Government
  - Type: Indiana township

Area
  - Total: 47.66 sq mi (123.4 km^{2})
  - Land: 47.66 sq mi (123.4 km^{2})
  - Water: 0 sq mi (0 km^{2}) 0%
- Elevation: 728 ft (222 m)

Population (2020)
  - Total: 230
  - Density: 4.8/sq mi (1.9/km^{2})
- Time zone: UTC-5 (Eastern (EST))
  - Summer (DST): UTC-4 (EDT)
- Area code: 765
- GNIS feature ID: 453772

Prairie Township is one of twelve townships in Warren County, Indiana, United States. According to the 2020 census, its population was 230 and it contained 110 housing units; the population density is the lowest of any township in the county, at 6.1 inhabitants per square mile (2.4/km^{2}).

Historical population
Census	Pop.	Note	%±
1890	763		—
1900	826		8.3%
1910	792		−4.1%
1920	801		1.1%
1930	838		4.6%
1940	742		−11.5%
1950	667		−10.1%
1960	583		−12.6%
1970	397		−31.9%
1980	396		−0.3%
1990	318		−19.7%
2000	290		−8.8%
2010	257		−11.4%
2020	230		−10.5%
Source: US Decennial Census

== History ==
Prairie Township was formed in 1864 out of a portion of Pine Township.

== Geography ==
According to the 2010 census, the township has a total area of 47.66 square miles (123.4 km^{2}), all land. It is almost entirely agricultural and contains a single town, Tab. Two other small communities in the eastern part of the township, Locust Grove and Walnut Grove, dwindled away during the 20th century and are now extinct.

Map of Prairie Township

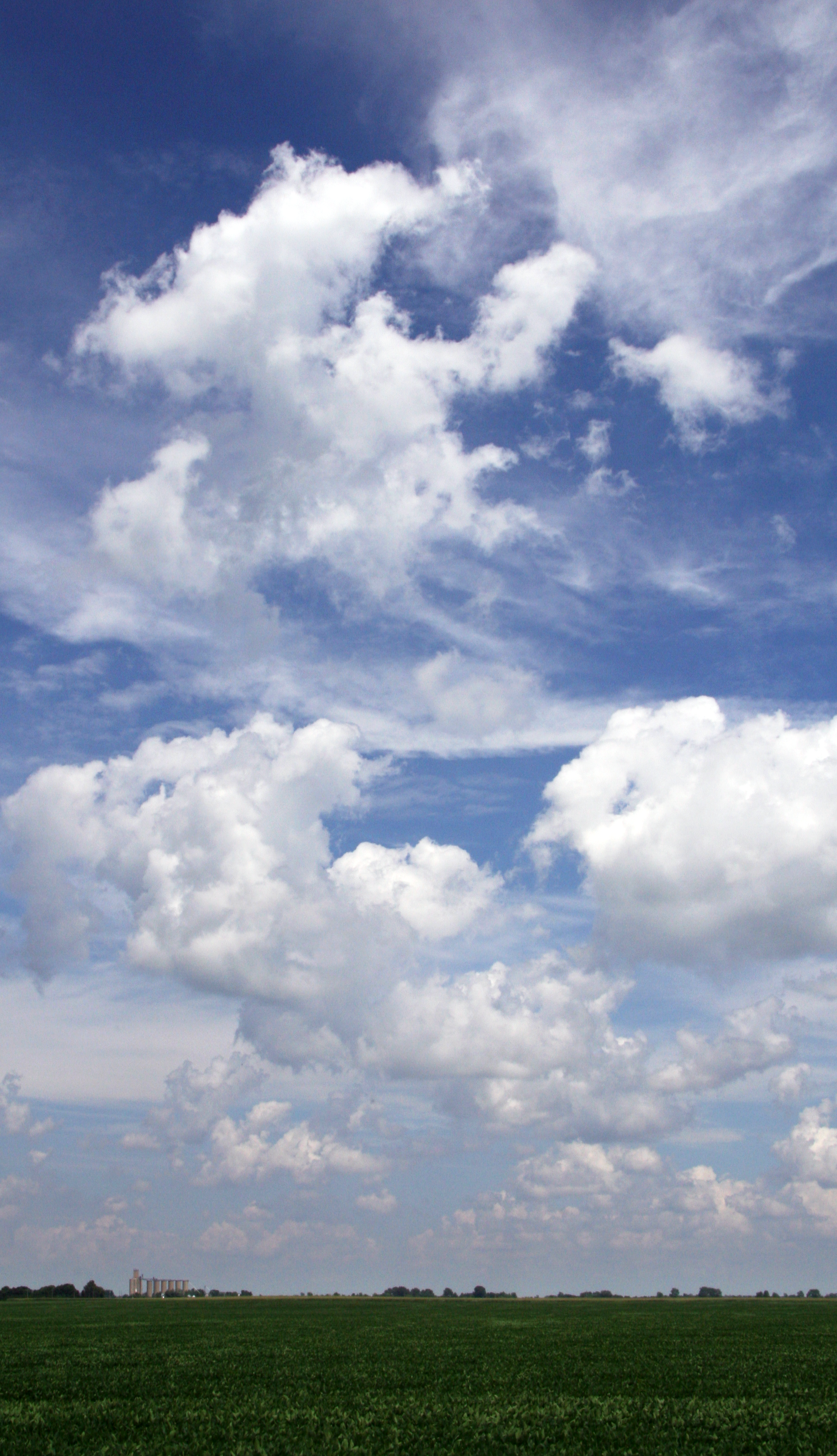
Cloudscape over fields near Tab

=== Transportation ===
U.S. Route 41 runs along a portion of the township's eastern border, starting at the northeastern corner and going south for about 1 mile (1.6 km) before veering to the east. Indiana State Road 26 runs from the Illinois state line and across the northern part of the township, reaching U.S. Route 41 at the eastern border. Indiana State Road 352 leaves State Road 26 at the western border and runs north for about 1 mile (1.6 km) before leaving the township (and the county) on its way through the small town of Ambia in Benton County. The township contains Dalton Airport.

== Education ==
Most of Prairie township lies in the Benton Community School Corporation, and the southern portion of Prairie Township is part of the Metropolitan School District of Warren County.

== Government ==
Prairie Township has a trustee who administers rural fire protection and ambulance service, provides relief to the poor, manages cemetery care, and performs farm assessment, among other duties. The trustee is assisted in these duties by a three-member township board. The trustees and board members are elected to four-year terms.

Prairie Township is part of Indiana's 8th congressional district, Indiana House of Representatives District 42, and Indiana State Senate District 38.
