= Kickapoo, Indiana =

- Ghost town
- Location in Warren County
- Coordinates: 40°19′48″N 87°13′59″W
- Country: United States
- State: Indiana
- County: Warren
- Township: Warren
- Time zone: UTC-5 (Eastern (EST))
  - Summer (DST): UTC-4 (EDT)
- ZIP code: 47918
- Area code: 765

Kickapoo was a small town (now extinct) in Warren Township, Warren County, in the U.S. state of Indiana.

== History ==
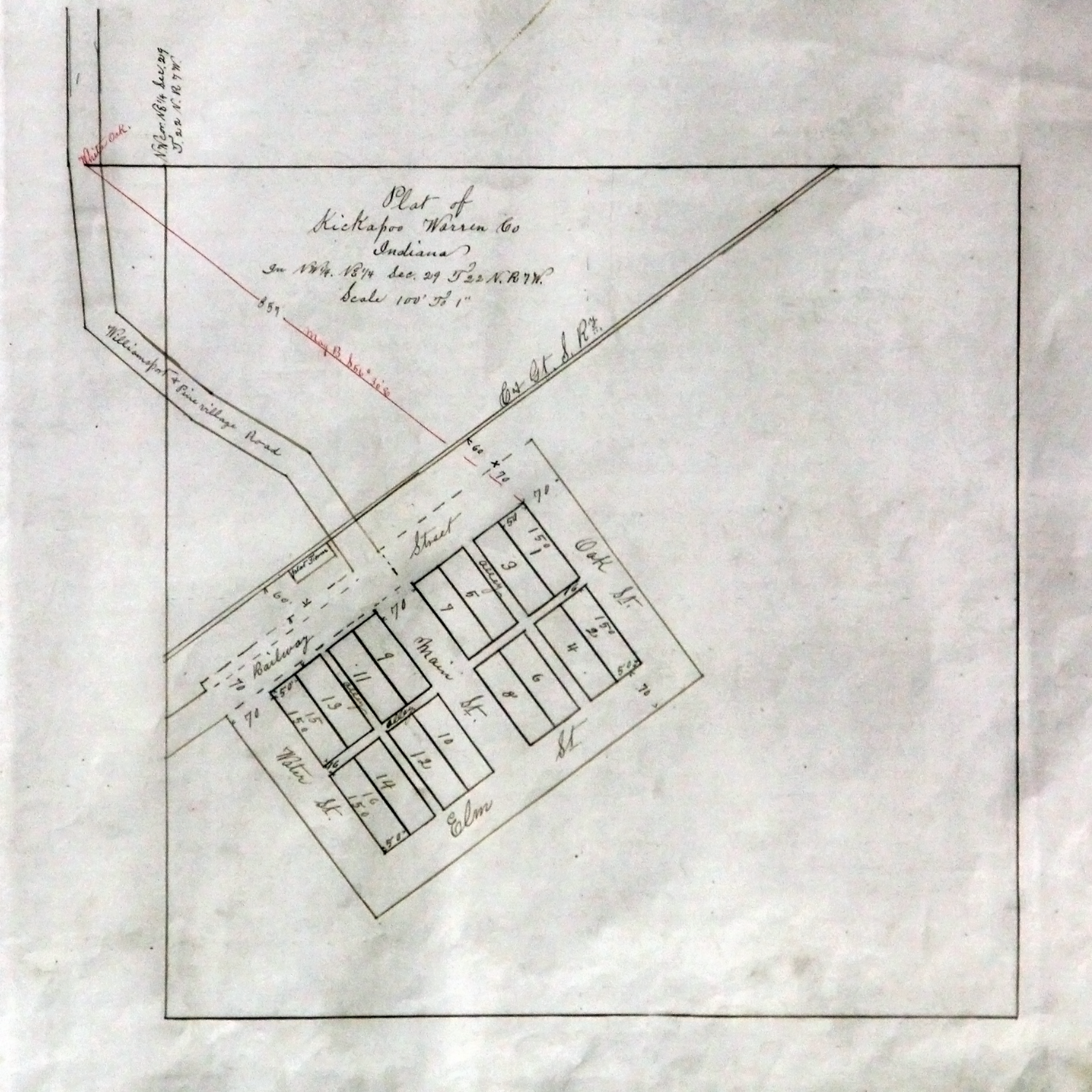
Kickapoo's 1885 plat

Platted by Lewis Davisson on February 2, 1885, the town was served by the newly constructed Chicago and Great Southern Railway. The town never grew substantially and is described in a 1913 history as having "a small population".

== Geography ==
Kickapoo was located in section 29, township 22, range 7 west, along what is now Kickapoo Road (County Road 425 E). Kickapoo Creek flows past the site and meets the Wabash River about a mile to the south.
