= Dresser, Indiana =

- Ghost town
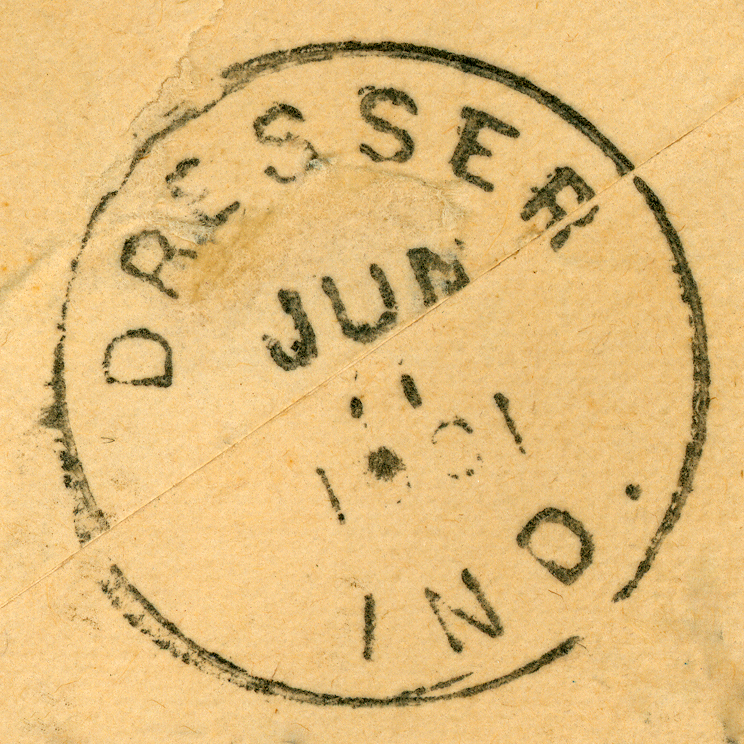
- Postmark from the Dresser post office

- Location in Warren County
- Coordinates: 40°11′56″N 87°26′59″W
- Country: United States
- State: Indiana
- County: Warren
- Township: Steuben
- Time zone: UTC-5 (Eastern (EST))
  - Summer (DST): UTC-4 (EDT)
- ZIP code: 47993
- Area code: 765

Dresser was a small town in Steuben Township, Warren County, in the U.S. state of Indiana. It was founded shortly before the turn of the 20th century and consisted of several residences and a post office. The post office operated only from 1899 to 1903. The town was named after Paul Dresser, the American songwriter who wrote "On the Banks of the Wabash, Far Away" (which became Indiana's state song); Harvey Porter Layton, the first postmaster, had met Dresser at the Hotel Mudlavia and was so impressed with the man that he named the town after him.

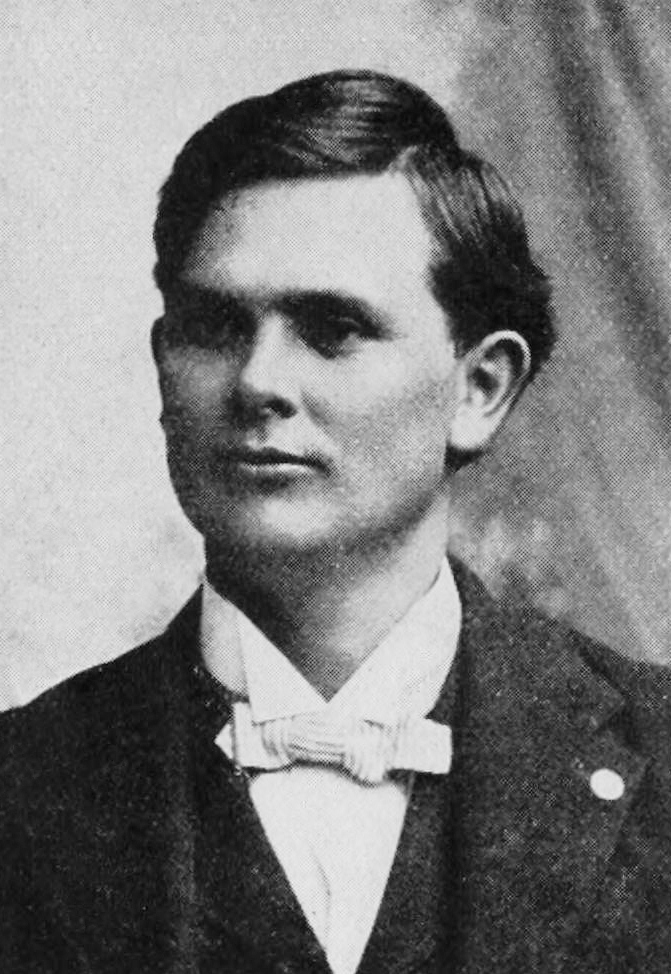
Harvey Porter Layton
