= Indiana State Road 263 =

State highway in Indiana, United States

State Road 263
- SR 263 highlighted in red

Route information
- Maintained by INDOT
- Length: 12.913 mi (20.781 km)

Major junctions
- South end: SR 63 near Covington
- North end: SR 63 north of West Lebanon

Location
- Country: United States
- State: Indiana
- Counties: Warren

Highway system
- Indiana State Highway System; Interstate; US; State; Scenic
← SR 262	→ SR 264

State Road 263 is a business route of State Road 63 which runs through West Lebanon in Warren County, covering a distance of about 13 miles (21 km). It is an undivided two-lane surface road for its entire length.

== Route description ==
At the south end, State Road 263 leaves State Road 63 less than a mile north of U.S. Route 136. It passes under the Vermilion Valley Railroad after about a quarter of a mile, and for the next several miles it runs northeast through wooded country, staying within a mile of the Wabash River to the east and passing through the defunct river town of Baltimore. It then leaves the river and strikes north toward the town of West Lebanon, passing through some hilly and wooded country as it ascends from the river.

Upon reaching the south edge of West Lebanon (the portion locally known as "Old Town"), State Road 263 is concurrent with High Street; it crosses a Norfolk Southern railway in the north part of town and intersects State Road 28 at the north edge of town. The remaining portion of the highway runs through open country and passes just to the east of Seeger Memorial Junior-Senior High School and Warren Central Elementary School, and finally rejoins State Road 63 about a mile further north, just beyond Division Road.

== History ==
State Road 263 is a portion of the original route of State Road 63. The new four-lane divided highway was constructed to the west in the early 1970s and was often called "New 63" by residents of the area; the resulting business route officially named State Road 263 was often called "Old 63". Some locals still use these names.

== Major intersections ==
The entire route is in Warren County.

Location	mi	km	Destinations	Notes
Mound Township	0.000	0.000	SR 63	Southern terminus of SR 263
West Lebanon	10.178	16.380	SR 28 – Williamsport	
Liberty Township	12.913	20.781	SR 63	Northern terminus of SR 263
1.000 mi = 1.609 km; 1.000 km = 0.621 mi
