= Baltimore, Indiana =

- Ghost town
- Location in Warren County
- Coordinates: 40°09′57″N 87°26′31″W
- Country: United States
- State: Indiana
- County: Warren
- Township: Mound
- Time zone: UTC-5 (Eastern (EST))
  - Summer (DST): UTC-4 (EDT)
- ZIP code: 47932
- Area code: 765

Baltimore was a small town built on the western banks of the Wabash River in Mound Township, Warren County, in the U.S. state of Indiana.

== History ==
Baltimore was laid out in November 1829 by William Willmeth and Samuel Hill. It flourished for several years, and the population reached 70. In 1830, Samuel Hill had a stock of merchandise worth $2500 at his establishment, which was the largest stock in the county at the time. A post office was established in 1833, and remained in operation until it was discontinued in 1865. Another store was opened by Samuel Wetzel in 1839. When the Wabash and Erie Canal was completed on the opposite side of the river in the 1840s, the community dwindled. A single brick house built in the 1880s is the last remaining structure of Baltimore.

== Geography ==
Baltimore was located along State Road 263 near its intersection with County Road 1025 South. Baltimore Cemetery and Rodgers Cemetery lie about a quarter mile to the west.
