= Medina Township, Warren County, Indiana =

Medina Township
- Township
- Location of Medina Township in Warren County

- Location of Indiana in the United States
- Coordinates: 40°26′12″N 87°08′27″W
- Country: United States
- State: Indiana
- County: Warren

Government
  - Type: Indiana township

Area
  - Total: 27.07 sq mi (70.1 km^{2})
  - Land: 26.84 sq mi (69.5 km^{2})
  - Water: 0.23 sq mi (0.60 km^{2}) 0.85%
- Elevation: 696 ft (212 m)

Population (2020)
  - Total: 510
  - Density: 19/sq mi (7.3/km^{2})
- Time zone: UTC-5 (Eastern (EST))
  - Summer (DST): UTC-4 (EDT)
- Area code: 765
- GNIS feature ID: 453617

Medina Township is one of twelve townships in Warren County, Indiana, United States. According to the 2020 census, its population was 510 and it contained 200 housing units.

Historical population
Census	Pop.	Note	%±
1890	700		—
1900	637		−9.0%
1910	580		−8.9%
1920	561		−3.3%
1930	492		−12.3%
1940	473		−3.9%
1950	479		1.3%
1960	445		−7.1%
1970	403		−9.4%
1980	381		−5.5%
1990	371		−2.6%
2000	452		21.8%
2010	457		1.1%
2020	510		11.6%
Source: US Decennial Census

== History ==
Medina Township was one of the original four created when the county was organized in 1827.

== Geography ==
According to the 2010 census, the township has a total area of 27.07 square miles (70.1 km^{2}), of which 26.84 square miles (69.5 km^{2}) (or 99.15%) is land and 0.23 square miles (0.60 km^{2}) (or 0.85%) is water. It contains one town, Green Hill, which is in the southeast part of the township. The stream of Armstrong Creek runs through this township.

Map of Medina Township

=== Cemeteries ===
The township contains Armstrong Chapel Cemetery, Davis Cemetery, and Pond Grove Cemetery.

=== Transportation ===
Indiana State Road 26 runs across the north part of the township from west to east, connecting Pine Village (in neighboring Adams Township to the west) with Lafayette to the east.

== Education ==
Medina Township is part of the Benton Community School Corporation.

== Government ==
Medina Township has a trustee who administers rural fire protection and ambulance service, provides relief to the poor, manages cemetery care, and performs farm assessment, among other duties. The trustee is assisted in these duties by a three-member township board. The trustees and board members are elected to four-year terms.

Medina Township is part of Indiana's 8th congressional district, Indiana House of Representatives District 26, and Indiana State Senate District 38.
