= Marshfield, Indiana =

Census-designated place in Warren County, Indiana, United States

Marshfield
- Census-designated place
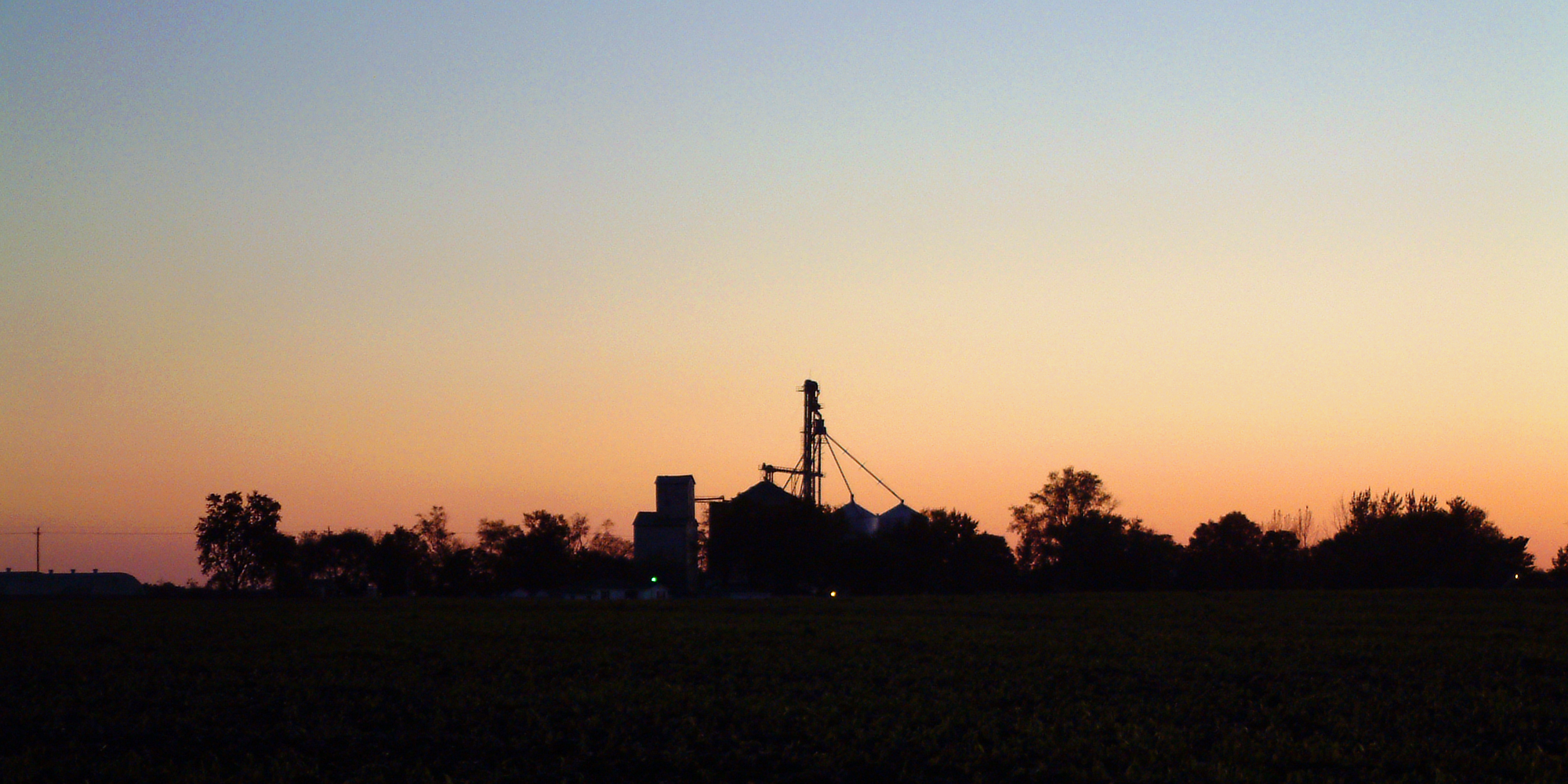
- Looking southwest toward town at dusk

- Location within Warren County, Indiana Location within Indiana Location within the United States
- Coordinates: 40°15′02″N 87°27′07″W
- Country: United States
- State: Indiana
- County: Warren
- Township: Steuben
- Founded: 1857
- Named for: Marshfield, Massachusetts

Area
  - Total: 0.16 sq mi (0.41 km^{2})
  - Land: 0.16 sq mi (0.41 km^{2})
- Elevation: 692 ft (211 m)

Population (2020)
  - Total: 41
  - Density: 256.8/sq mi (99.15/km^{2})
- Time zone: UTC-5 (Eastern (EST))
  - Summer (DST): UTC-4 (EDT)
- ZIP code: 47993
- Area code: 765
- GNIS feature ID: 2806525

Marshfield is a census-designated place in Steuben Township, Warren County, Indiana, United States. As of the 2020 census, Marshfield had a population of 41.

== History ==
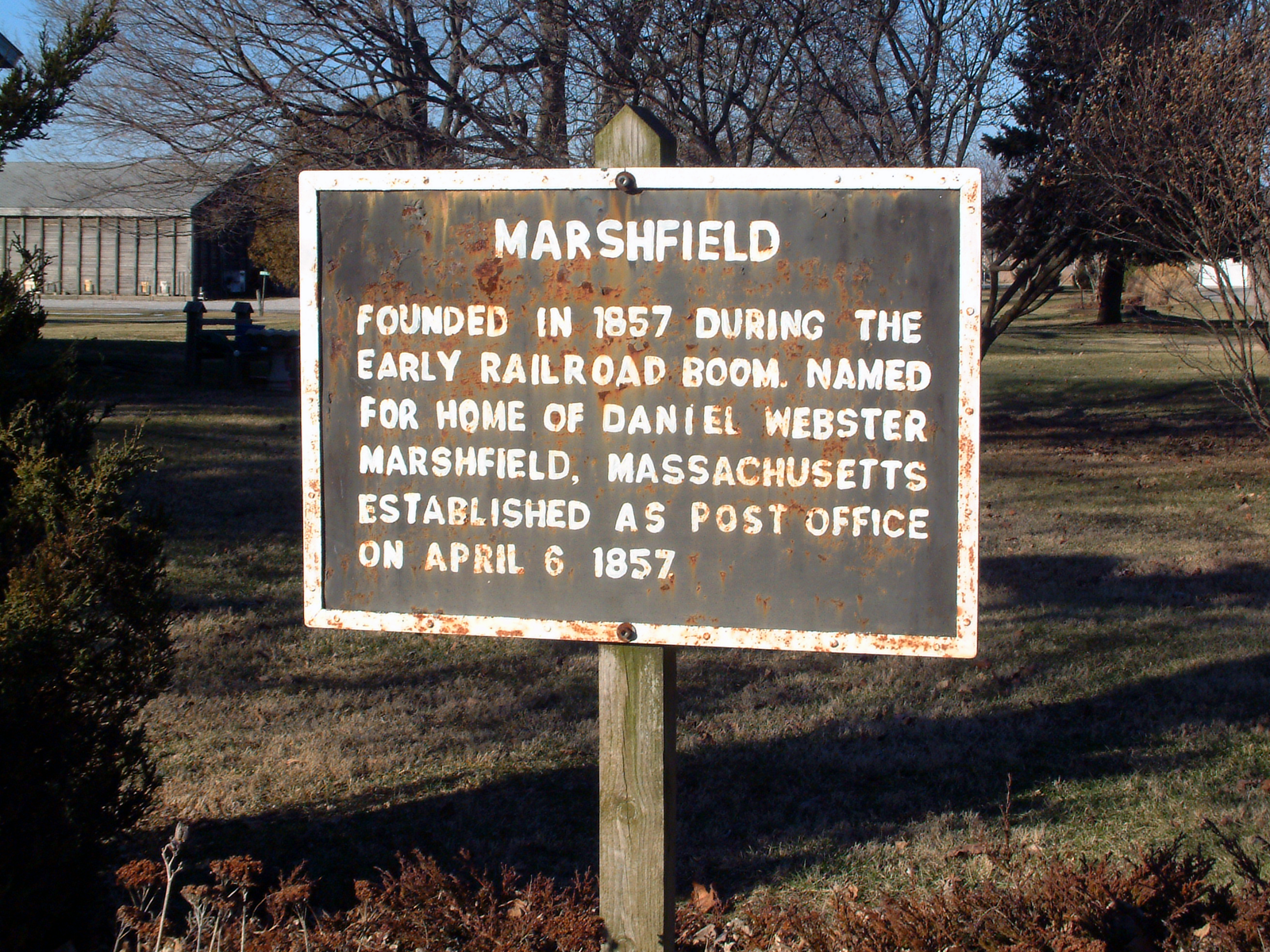
Historical marker on State Avenue

The town of Marshfield was platted on May 22, 1857, and named for Marshfield, Massachusetts, the home of statesman Daniel Webster. A post office was established on April 6, 1857, which operated until 1989. In 1870, the population was 150 and, by 1900, it had grown to 250. In the late 1800s, the town had a dry goods store, a hotel, three churches, three saloons, two blacksmith shops, a grain warehouse, a wagon and carriage manufactory, a grocery store, a drug store and three physicians.

In 2007, Marshfield consisted of a number of private residences, a grain elevator, a church and a body shop.

== Geography ==
Marshfield is located in open farmland on County Road 450 South, about 1.75 miles (2.82 km) west of State Road 63, at an elevation of 699 feet (213 m). Chesapeake Creek begins just east of town, and an early village named Chesapeake once stood about 2 miles (3.2 km) to the east. A Norfolk Southern Railway line runs along the east side of town, from Danville, Illinois, in the southwest to Lafayette in the northeast; the line carries about 45 freight trains per day.

== Demographics ==
Historical population
Census	Pop.	Note	%±
2020	41		—
U.S. Decennial Census

== Education ==
It is in the Metropolitan School District of Warren County.

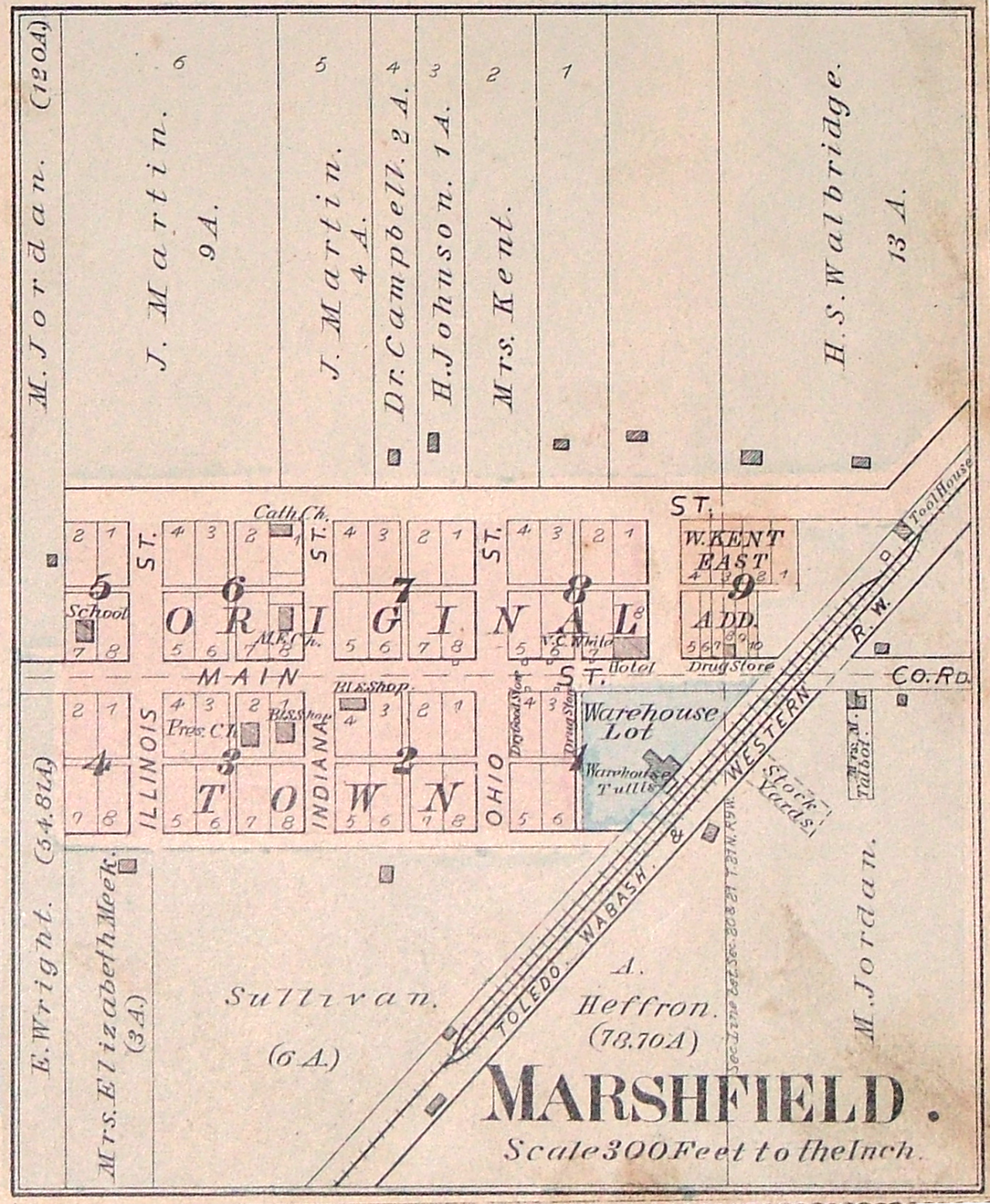
Map from 1877 Warren County Atlas

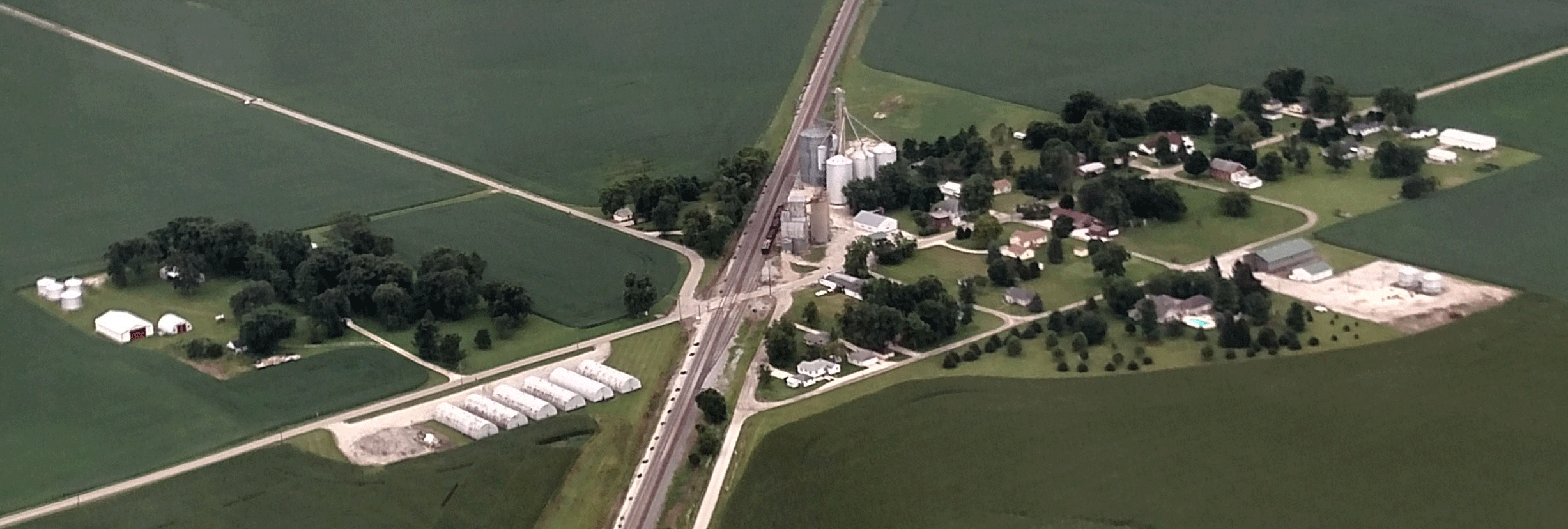
Aerial view looking to the southwest

== See also ==
- List of census-designated places in Indiana
