= Metropolitan School District of Warren County =

School district in Indiana

Coordinates: 40.2872°N 87.2938°W

Location
- Warren County, Indiana United States

District information
- Type: Public
- Grades: KG-12
- Established: January 1973
- Superintendent: Ralph Shrader
- Schools: 4

Students and staff
- Students: 1257
- Teachers: 91
- Student–teacher ratio: 13.8:1

Other information
- Website: msdwarco.k12.in.us

The Metropolitan School District of Warren County administers the one high school/middle school and three elementary schools in Warren County, Indiana. Its offices are located in the county seat of Williamsport. During the 2009–10 school year, it served 1,257 students.

The district boundary includes the majority of, but not all of, the county.

== History ==
After winning approval in the fall 1972 election, the MSD of Warren County was formed in January 1973 through the merger of two other school districts. These were Warren Central Consolidation which included the schools at West Lebanon, Marshfield, State Line, Judyville and Kramer, and Warren Community Schools which administered schools at Pine Village and Williamsport. John Robert "Bob" Johnson, Seeger High School principal, became superintendent of the new consolidated district. Its offices were established in the former REMC building at 101 North Monroe Street. Superintendent Bob Johnson retired in 1987 and was replaced by Roy Stroud, who was assistant superintendent. The 1988 Williamsport fire damaged the building to such an extent that it had to be demolished. The district's current offices were constructed on the site in 1989. Stroud served as superintendent for 14 years and was replaced by Terry Roderick when he retired as superintendent in 2001. Stroud continued to serve several years as the Lilly Grant administrator. Superintendent Stroud and Tom Polf (History teacher, guidance counselor, and coach) were the last two employees to retire from MSD who were there when the consolidation occurred in 1972. Both had served 42 years each.

== Schools ==
- Seeger Memorial Junior-Senior High School
- Pine Village Elementary School
- Warren Central Elementary School
- Williamsport Elementary School
