= Tab, Indiana =

- Unincorporated community and Census-designated place
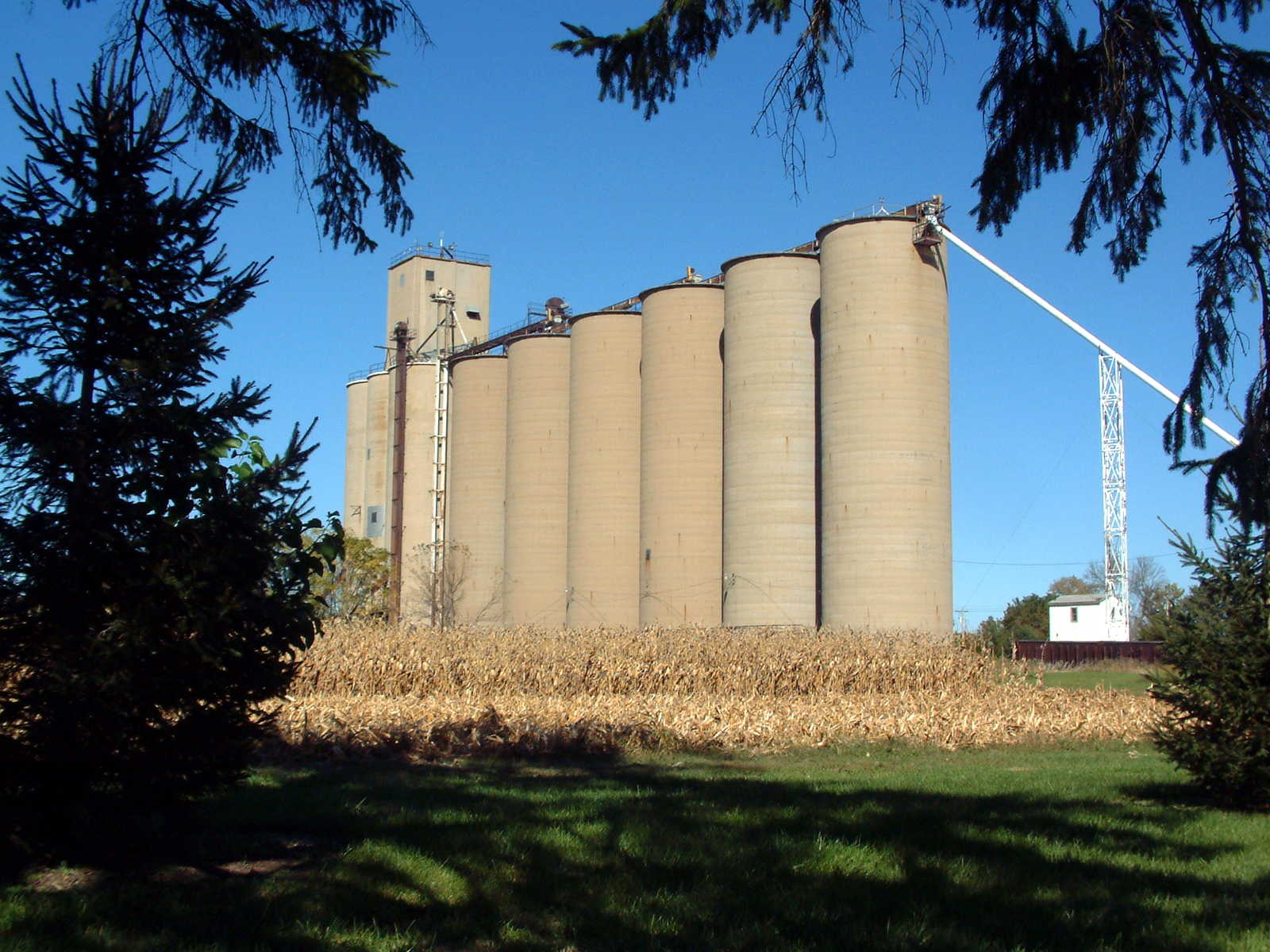
- Grain elevator in Tab

- Location within Warren County, Indiana Location within Indiana Location within the United States
- Coordinates: 40°24′54″N 87°28′38″W
- Country: United States
- State: Indiana
- County: Warren
- Township: Prairie
- Founded: 1905
- Founder: Harrison "Tab" Goodwine

Area
  - Total: 0.24 sq mi (0.61 km^{2})
  - Land: 0.23 sq mi (0.60 km^{2})
- Elevation: 719 ft (219 m)

Population (2020)
  - Total: 36
  - Density: 153.6/sq mi (59.32/km^{2})
- Time zone: UTC-5 (Eastern (EST))
  - Summer (DST): UTC-4 (EDT)
- ZIP code: 47993
- Area code: 765
- GNIS feature ID: 2806569

Tab is an unincorporated community in Warren County, Indiana, United States. Its only current business or service is the Tabor Grain Company (a subsidiary of Archer Daniels Midland) which operates the town's grain elevators. The present population of Tab is 36 as of the 2020 census

== History ==
The town was platted on November 25, 1905, by Harrison "Tab" Goodwine, who donated land for the town and the railroad. A post office was established in Tab on April 8, 1907, and closed on April 30, 1955.

Tab was home to a number of businesses in the early 20th century, including a hotel, lumberyard, hardware store, bank, blacksmith, barber shop, pool hall, telephone office, auto repair shop, two grocery stores and a Standard Oil bulk plant. There was also a train station, plus livestock pens for those animals being shipped. An annual Fall Festival used to be held which featured sack races, tug-of-war, baseball, hog-calling contests and competitions for who could harness and unharness a team of horses the fastest.

== Geography ==
Tab is located in the northwestern part of the county at the intersection of County Road 650 North and the Bee Line Railroad. Jordan Creek begins a few miles northeast of town and flows past Tab to the east.

== Demographics ==
Historical population
Census	Pop.	Note	%±
2020	36		—
U.S. Decennial Census

== Education ==
It is in the Benton Community School Corporation.
