= Timeline of Warren County, Indiana history =

This article is a timeline of Warren County, Indiana history.

== 19th century ==
=== 1800s ===
- c.1802 – Zachariah Cicott arrives to trade with local Indian tribes. Cicott is considered the first European to enter the area that will become Warren County.

=== 1810s ===
- 1811 November – William Henry Harrison leads an army through the county to the Battle of Tippecanoe, guided by Cicott.
- 1816 December 11 – Indiana is admitted to the Union.

=== 1820s ===
- 1827 March 1 – Warren County established by the Indiana General Assembly.
- 1827 November 6 – The county is divided into four townships: Mound, Pike, Warren, and Medina.
- 1828 March – Warrenton selected as the Warren County seat.
- 1828 July 8 – Warrenton platted by Luther Tillotson.
- 1828 December 11 – Williamsport platted by William Harrison and Perrin Kent.
- 1829 – Baltimore established along the Wabash River.
- 1829 June – Williamsport becomes the county seat.
- 1829 September 28 – Williamsport post office established.

=== 1830s ===
- 1830 March – Washington Township formed.
- 1830 July 14 – Failed town of Point Pleasant platted by John H. Bartlett.
- 1830 September – West Lebanon platted by Ebenezer Purviance, John G. Jemison and Andrew Fleming.
- 1831 November – First Warren County jail completed.
- 1832 March 5 – Brothers William B. Bailey and Horatio Bailey plat the town of Milford (later known as Green Hill).
- 1832 October 5 – Independence platted by Zachariah Cicott.
- 1832 December 26 – West Lebanon post office established.
- 1833 April 16 – Rainsville platted by Isaac Rains.
- 1834 March – Steuben Township formed.
- 1834 March 24 – Independence post office established.
- 1834 June – First purpose-built courthouse completed.
- 1836 February 5 – Rainsville post office established.
- 1837 December 2 – Poolesville post office established at Milford (Green Hill).
- 1838 September 14 – The Potawatomi Trail of Death camps near Williamsport.
- 1838 September 15 – The Potawatomi Trail of Death camps in what later became Kent Township.

=== 1840s ===
- 1848 – Adams Township formed.
- 1849 Fall – New Warren County jail completed.

=== 1850s ===
- 1850 – Jordan Township formed.
- 1850 – Zachariah Cicott dies and is buried in Independence.
- 1851 – Pine Village laid out by Isaac and John R. Metsker.
- 1853 September 6–7 – The first county fair is held at Independence.
- 1854 March – Williamsport incorporated.
- 1857 – Wabash Railroad completed through the county.
- 1857 April 6 – Marshfield post office established.
- 1857 May 22 – Marshfield platted.
- 1857 June 29 – State Line City platted by Robert Casement.

=== 1860s ===
- 1861 February 11 – President-elect Abraham Lincoln delivers a brief speech in State Line.
- 1864 September – Kent Township formed.
- 1869 – Green Hill incorporated.
- 1869 – West Lebanon incorporated.
- 1869 – Indianapolis, Bloomington and Western Railway is constructed across Mound Township.

=== 1870s ===
- 1872 June – Pumpkin Vine Railroad construction begins.
- 1872 December – Second courthouse completed.
- 1873 July – Pumpkin Vine Railroad construction completed.
- 1874 July 8 – Johnsonville platted by John R. Johnson, Senior.
- 1875 December 2 – Johnsonville post office established.
- 1879 – James Frank Hanly, later the Governor of Indiana, moves to Williamsport at age 16.
- 1879 – Portion of Pumpkin Vine Railroad north of Covington is closed.

=== 1880s ===
- 1880 – Warren County portion of Pumpkin Vine Railroad is taken up.
- 1881 July 31 – Hedrick platted by Parmenas G. Smith and G. W. Compton.
- 1884 March 3 – Winthrop platted by Jacob Morgan Rhode.
- 1885 February 2 – Kickapoo platted by Lewis Davisson.
- 1885 November 5 – Cameron Springs post office established.
- 1886 – The county's third courthouse is constructed.
- 1889 June 12 – Cameron Springs renamed to Indiana Mineral Springs.
- 1889 – James Frank Hanly is admitted to the bar and joins a law office in Williamsport.

=== 1890s ===
- 1890 December 25 – Hotel at the Indiana Mineral Springs (later called Hotel Mudlavia) is opened by H. L. Kramer.

== 20th century ==
=== 1900s ===
- 1900 September – State Line's grain elevator burns.
- 1901 March 23 – Indiana Mineral Springs (formerly Cameron Springs) renamed to Kramer.
- 1902 September – Pence established by Frank R. Pence.
- 1903 February 9 – Judyville platted by John F. Judy.
- 1903 October 12 – Pence post office established.
- 1903 October 1 – Judyville post office established.
- 1904 September 15 – Rainsville post office closes.
- 1905 January 9 – Williamsport resident Frank Hanly begins his four-year term as state governor.
- 1905 November 25 – Tab platted by Harrison "Tab" Goodwine.
- 1907 January 20 – The county's third courthouse building burns.
- 1907 April 8 – Tab post office established.
- 1907 August 31 – Johnsonville post office closes.
- 1907 October – Construction begins on the fourth (and current) courthouse.

=== 1910s ===
- 1912 – Vernon Burge becomes the first American enlisted man to be certified as a pilot.
- 1914 June 18 – Sloan post office established.
- 1916 – West Lebanon's Carnegie library opens.
- 1917 – Williamsport's Carnegie library opens.

=== 1920s ===
- 1920 February 29 – Hotel Mudlavia is destroyed by fire.
- 1922 April 17 – A tornado decimates Hedrick.
- 1922 October – The Chicago, Attica and Southern Railroad is incorporated.

=== 1930s ===
- 1932 December – State Line's grain elevator burns.

=== 1940s ===
- 1941 November 29 – Sloan post office closes.
- 1945 – The Chicago, Attica and Southern Railroad is scrapped.

=== 1950s ===
- 1950 January 31 – Independence post office closes.
- 1955 April 30 – Tab post office closes.
- 1957 April 5 – Pence post office closes.
- 1959 – Classes begin at the newly constructed Seeger Memorial Junior-Senior High School north of West Lebanon, replacing several other older high schools in the county.

=== 1960s ===
- 1961 January 6 – Judyville post office closes.
- 1964 September 19 – Wabash Cannonball passenger train collides with a truck at a Johnsonville crossing and derails.

=== 1970s ===
- 1973 Fall – Seeger High School adopts the Patriot as its mascot, replacing the Indian.
- 1978 January – The Great Blizzard of 1978 hits Warren County and closes schools for seventeen days.

=== 1980s ===
- 1984 – State Line's grain elevator burns.
- 1985 April 12 – Green Hill native Donald E. Williams makes his first space flight as pilot of the Space Shuttle Discovery (STS-51-D).
- 1988 July 4 – Fire destroys several buildings in Williamsport along the east side Monroe Street south of the court house, including the offices of the school district. The fire is later ruled arson and the suspect convicted.
- 1989 – Marshfield post office closes.
- 1989 October 18 – Donald Williams flies aboard the Space Shuttle Atlantis (STS-34) and assists in the deployment of the Galileo spacecraft.

=== 1990s ===
- 1995 – Stephanie White of the Seeger basketball team is named Indiana Miss Basketball.

== 21st century ==
=== 2000s ===
- 2001 August 1 – An accidental fire destroys the home of Judyville founder John F. Judy.
- 2002 – Newly constructed Williamsport-Washington Township Public Library opens.
- 2004 – Seeger High School wins the Indiana Class 1A State Football Championship.
- 2006 October 8 – Fire severely damages the Williamsport-Washington Township Public Library.
- 2007 Fall – Renovated Williamsport-Washington Township Public Library reopens.

=== 2010s ===
- 2011 January 26 – Fire destroys a row of buildings in West Lebanon, along the west side of High Street between First and North streets.
