= National Register of Historic Places listings in Warren County, Indiana =

Location of Warren County in Indiana

This is a list of the National Register of Historic Places listings in Warren County, Indiana.

This is intended to be a complete list of the properties on the National Register of Historic Places in Warren County, Indiana, United States. Latitude and longitude coordinates are provided for many National Register properties; these locations may be seen together in a map.

There are four properties listed on the National Register in the county.

Properties and districts located in incorporated areas display the name of the municipality, while properties and districts in unincorporated areas display the name of their civil township. Properties and districts split between multiple jurisdictions display the names of all jurisdictions.

This National Park Service list is complete through NPS recent listings posted December 19, 2025.

== Current listings ==
	Name on the Register	Image	Date listed	Location	City or town	Description
1	Andrew Brier House	Andrew Brier House	August 14, 1986 (#86001617)	Old U.S. Route 41 at Carbondale; 40°21′32″N 87°20′52″W	Liberty Township	
2	Kent House and Hitchens House	Kent House and Hitchens House	March 1, 1984 (#84001719)	500 Main and 303 Lincoln Sts. 40°16′54″N 87°17′20″W	Williamsport	
3	Van Reed Farmstead	Van Reed Farmstead	September 14, 2015 (#15000601)	5322 Old U.S. Route 41; 40°23′38″N 87°21′12″W	Pine Township	
4	Warren County Courthouse	Warren County Courthouse	March 19, 2008 (#08000195)	125 Monroe St. 40°17′17″N 87°17′39″W	Williamsport	

== See also ==
- List of National Historic Landmarks in Indiana
- National Register of Historic Places listings in Indiana
- Listings in neighboring counties: Benton, Fountain, Tippecanoe, Vermilion (IL), Vermillion
- List of Indiana state historical markers in Warren County
