= Mudlavia Springs, Indiana =

- Ghost town
- Location in Warren County
- Coordinates: 40°20′18″N 87°17′34″W
- Country: United States
- State: Indiana
- County: Warren
- Township: Liberty
- Elevation: 564 ft (172 m)
- Time zone: UTC-5 (Eastern (EST))
  - Summer (DST): UTC-4 (EDT)
- ZIP code: 47918
- Area code: 765
- GNIS feature ID: 439860

Mudlavia Springs is an extinct town that was located in Liberty Township in Warren County, Indiana, west of the town of Kramer. It was once home to the former Hotel Mudlavia.

Even though the community no longer exists, it is still cited by the USGS.

== Geography ==
Mudlavia Springs was located at 40°20′18″N 87°17′34″W, near the intersection of what is now Moores Hill Road and Hunter Hill Road with County Road 150 North, less than half a mile west of the town of Kramer. Big Pine Creek flows just west of the site.
