= List of Indiana state historical markers in Warren County =

Location of Warren County in Indiana

This is a list of the Indiana state historical markers in Warren County.

This is intended to be a complete list of the official state historical markers placed in Warren County, Indiana, United States by the Indiana Historical Bureau. The locations of the historical markers and their latitude and longitude coordinates are included below when available, along with their names, years of placement, and topics as recorded by the Historical Bureau. There are 2 historical markers located in Warren County.

== Historical markers ==
Marker title	Image	Year placed	Location	Topics
Williamsport, Warren County		1992	Warren County Courthouse lawn in Williamsport; 40°17′17″N 87°17′38″W	Historic District, Neighborhoods, and Towns, Politics
Pine Village Football		2002	State Road 55 at the fire station in Pine Village; 40°26′56.6″N 87°15′16″W	Sports

== See also ==
- List of Indiana state historical markers
- National Register of Historic Places listings in Warren County, Indiana
