= Brisco, Indiana =

- Ghost town
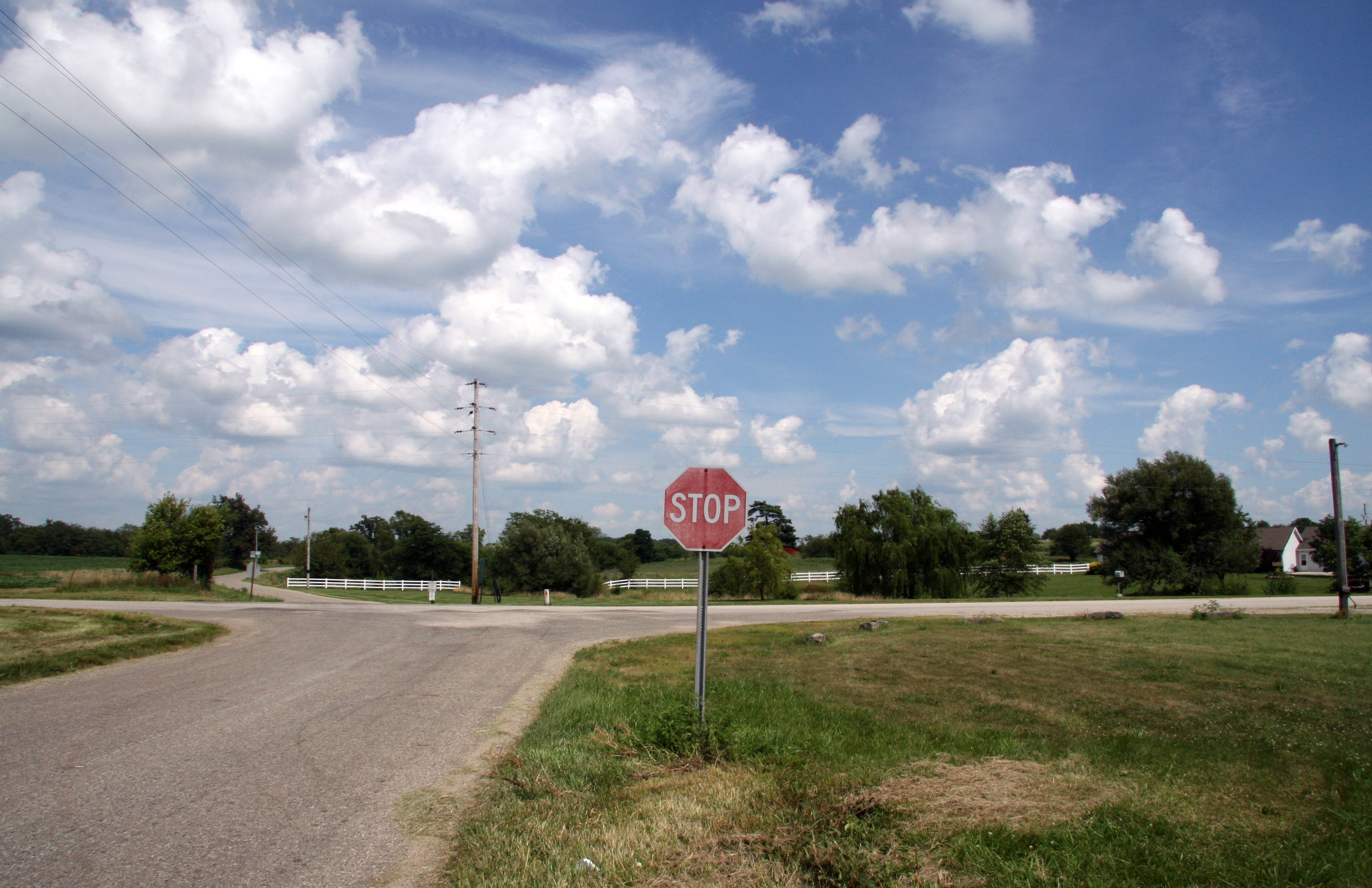
- Looking east toward the site of Brisco

- Brisco's location in Warren County
- Coordinates: 40°24′40″N 87°21′30″W
- Country: United States
- State: Indiana
- County: Warren
- Township: Pine
- Elevation: 679 ft (207 m)
- Time zone: UTC-5 (Eastern (EST))
  - Summer (DST): UTC-4 (EDT)
- ZIP code: 47993
- Area code: 765
- GNIS feature ID: 431533

Brisco (or Briscoe) was a small town in Pine Township, Warren County, in the U.S. state of Indiana. It began in the 1850s and gained a one-room school in 1856, which operated until 1929. In 1930 the school building became a general store run for more than 50 years by local resident Jim Marquess. Never more than a tiny hamlet, Brisco almost entirely disappeared during the 20th century. A cemetery northeast of town still bears the name.

== Geography ==
Brisco is located along Old US 41, about a quarter mile east of the intersection of County Road 650 North with U.S. Route 41 and roughly 9 miles north-northwest of the county seat of Williamsport. Mud Pine Creek flows just east of the site.
