= Chatterton, Indiana =

- Ghost town
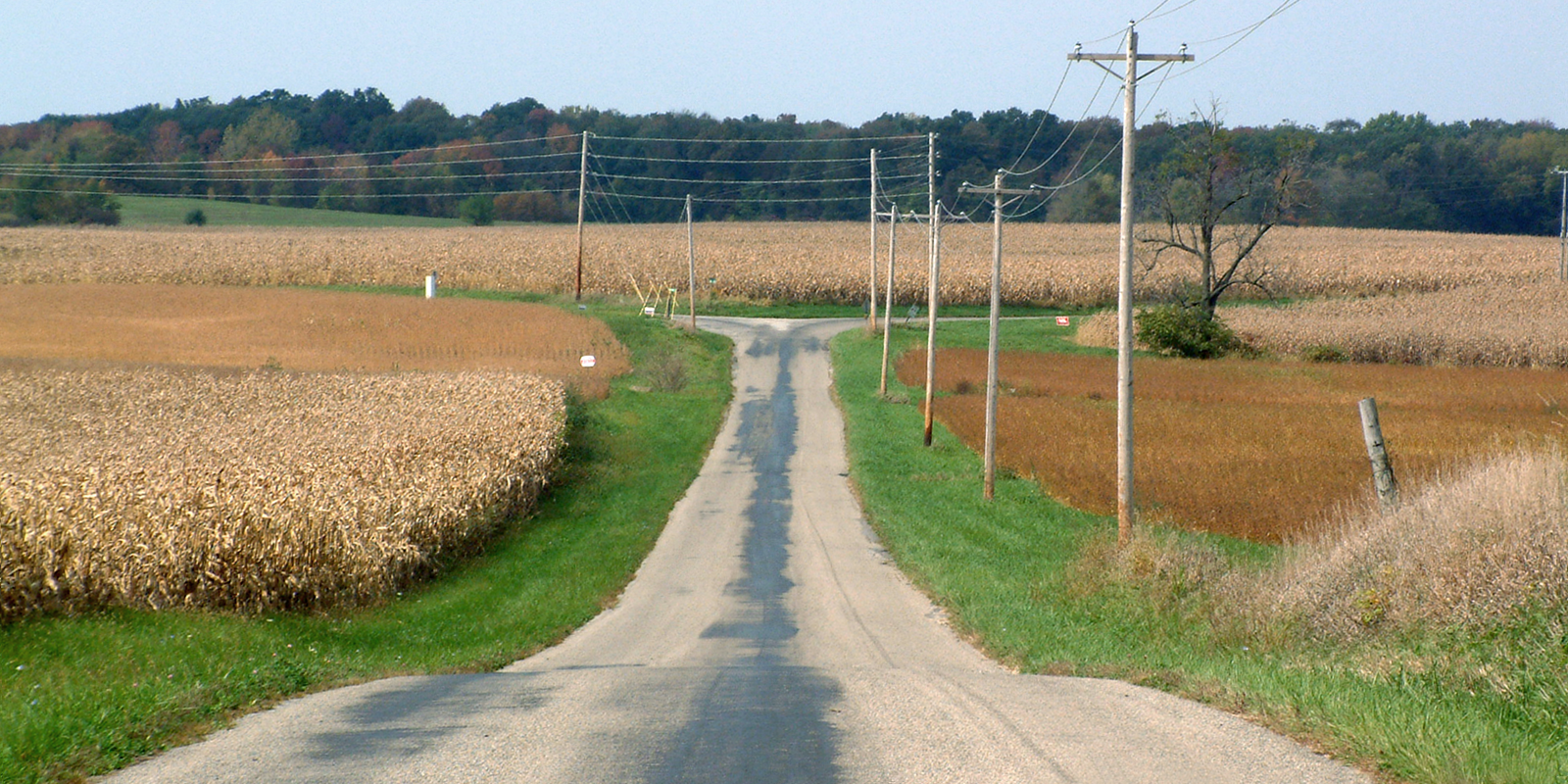
- Looking toward present-day Chatterton

- Chatterton's location in Warren County
- Coordinates: 40°24′13″N 87°14′23″W
- Country: United States
- State: Indiana
- County: Warren
- Township: Adams
- Elevation: 709 ft (216 m)
- Time zone: UTC-5 (Eastern (EST))
  - Summer (DST): UTC-4 (EDT)
- ZIP code: 47975
- Area code: 765
- GNIS feature ID: 432436

Chatterton was a small town in Adams Township, Warren County, in the U.S. state of Indiana. It was founded in 1896 and included a school, a general store, and a post office that operated from 1900 to 1906. Though it has since dwindled away completely, the location of the town persists on county maps, and is cited by the USGS.

== Geography ==
Chatterton was located about 3 miles (4.8 km) south of Pine Village.
