= Hooker Corner, Indiana =

- Ghost town
- Location in Warren County
- Coordinates: 40°27′17″N 87°18′59″W
- Country: United States
- State: Indiana
- County: Warren
- Township: Pine
- Elevation: 738 ft (225 m)
- Time zone: UTC-5 (Eastern (EST))
  - Summer (DST): UTC-4 (EDT)
- ZIP code: 47975
- Area code: 765
- GNIS feature ID: 436407

Hooker Corner is an extinct town that was located in Pine Township in Warren County, Indiana, west of the town of Pine Village.

A few buildings in the community exist, and it is still cited by the USGS.

== Geography ==
Hooker Corner is located near the intersection of Rainsville Road and State Road 26, approximately three-and-a-half miles west of Pine Village.
