= Kent Township, Warren County, Indiana =

Kent Township
- Township
- Location of Kent Township in Warren County

- Location of Indiana in the United States
- Coordinates: 40°11′44″N 87°28′32″W
- Country: United States
- State: Indiana
- County: Warren

Government
  - Type: Indiana township

Area
  - Total: 14.11 sq mi (36.5 km^{2})
  - Land: 14 sq mi (36 km^{2})
  - Water: 0.11 sq mi (0.28 km^{2}) 0.78%
- Elevation: 692 ft (211 m)

Population (2020)
  - Total: 452
  - Density: 32/sq mi (12/km^{2})
- Time zone: UTC-5 (Eastern (EST))
  - Summer (DST): UTC-4 (EDT)
- ZIP Code: 47993
- Area code: 765
- GNIS feature ID: 453524

Kent Township is one of twelve townships in Warren County, Indiana, United States. According to the 2020 census, its population was 452 and it contained 189 housing units.

Historical population
Census	Pop.	Note	%±
1890	629		—
1900	615		−2.2%
1910	540		−12.2%
1920	466		−13.7%
1930	414		−11.2%
1940	435		5.1%
1950	372		−14.5%
1960	398		7.0%
1970	387		−2.8%
1980	504		30.2%
1990	467		−7.3%
2000	421		−9.9%
2010	428		1.7%
2020	452		5.6%
Source: US Decennial Census

== History ==
Kent Township was created in September 1864 from a section of Mound Township.

== Geography ==
According to the 2010 census, the township has a total area of 14.11 square miles (36.5 km^{2}), of which 14 square miles (36 km^{2}) (or 99.22%) is land and 0.11 square miles (0.28 km^{2}) (or 0.78%) is water. It contains one town, State Line City, which is in the far western part of the township next to the Indiana / Illinois border.

Map of Kent Township

=== Cemeteries ===
The township contains Gopher Hill Cemetery and Masonic Cemetery.

=== Transportation ===
Both Indiana State Road 63 and Indiana State Road 263 pass through the eastern part of the township from north to south.

A Norfolk Southern Railway line enters the township from Danville, Illinois and passes through State Line City, continuing northeast toward the county seat of Williamsport.

== Education ==
Kent Township is part of the Metropolitan School District of Warren County.

== Government ==
Kent Township has a trustee who administers rural fire protection and ambulance service, provides poor relief, manages cemetery care, and performs farm assessment, among other duties. The trustee is assisted in these duties by a three-member township board. The trustees and board members are elected to four-year terms.

Kent Township is part of Indiana's 8th congressional district, Indiana House of Representatives District 42, and Indiana State Senate District 38.
