= Andrew Brier House =

Historic house in Indiana, United States

- U.S. National Register of Historic Places
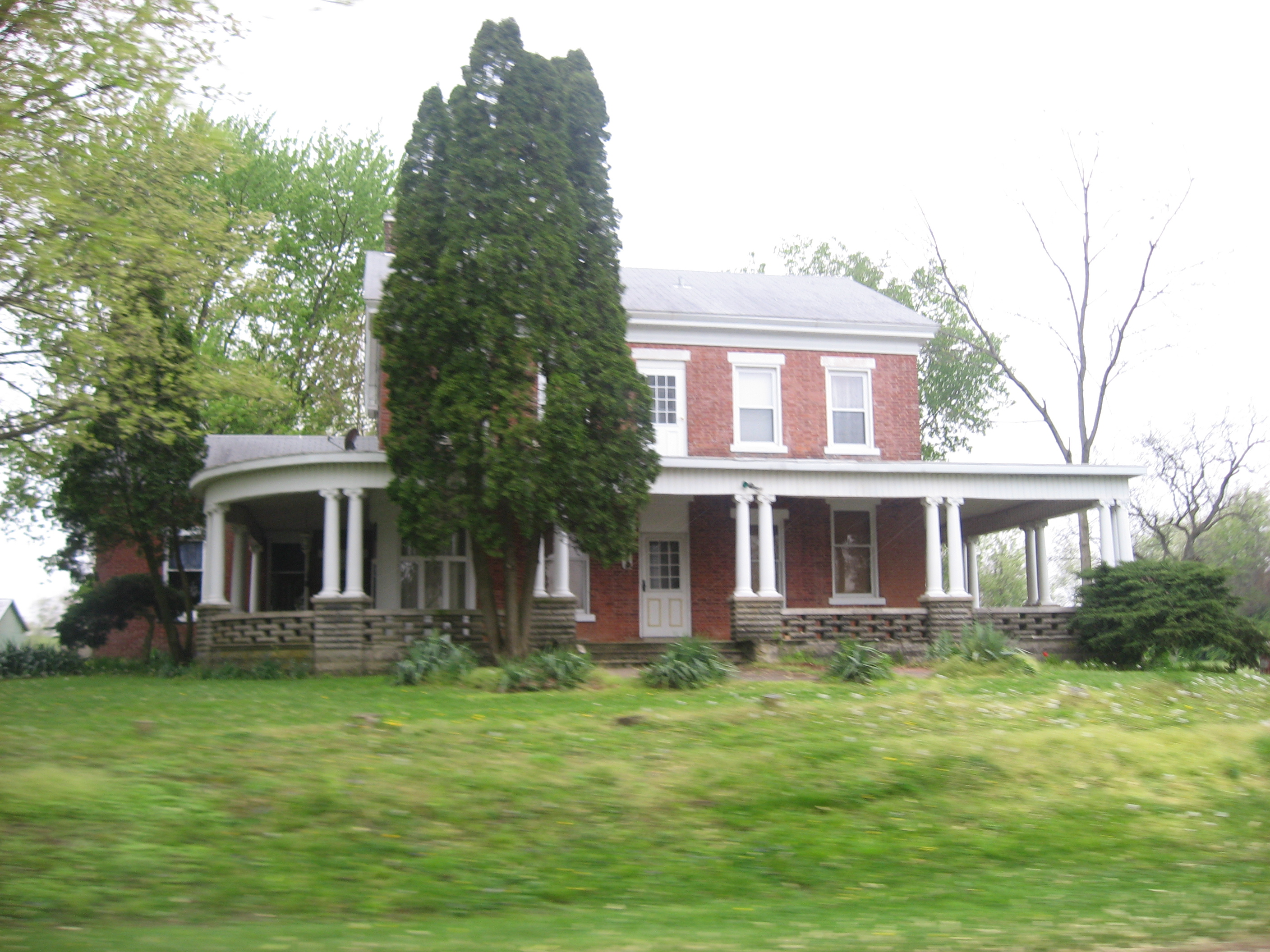
- Andrew Brier House, April 2012

- Location within Warren County, Indiana Location within Indiana Location within the United States
- Location: Old Hwy. 41 at Carbondale, Indiana
- Coordinates: 40°21′32″N 87°20′52″W
- Area: 2.4 acres (0.97 ha)
- Built: 1855
- Architectural style: Greek Revival
- NRHP reference No.: 86001617
- Added to NRHP: August 14, 1986

Andrew Brier House, also known as the Brier-Butler House, is a historic home located in Liberty Township, Warren County, Indiana. It was built in 1855, and is a 2 1/2-story, Greek Revival style brick dwelling with a rear wing. It has a gable roof and a large wraparound porch added at a later date. Also on the property are the contributing large gambrel roofed barn, ceramic silo, corn crib, garage, and pole barn.

It was listed on the National Register of Historic Places in 1986.
