= Pine Township, Warren County, Indiana =

Pine Township
- Township
- Location of Pine Township in Warren County

- Location of Indiana in the United States
- Coordinates: 40°25′40″N 87°19′12″W
- Country: United States
- State: Indiana
- County: Warren
- Established: March 1830

Government
  - Type: Indiana township

Area
  - Total: 36.16 sq mi (93.7 km^{2})
  - Land: 36.15 sq mi (93.6 km^{2})
  - Water: 0.01 sq mi (0.026 km^{2}) 0.03%
- Elevation: 679 ft (207 m)

Population (2020)
  - Total: 499
  - Density: 13.8/sq mi (5.33/km^{2})
- Time zone: UTC-5 (Eastern (EST))
  - Summer (DST): UTC-4 (EDT)
- Area code: 765
- GNIS feature ID: 453740

Pine Township is one of twelve townships in Warren County, Indiana, United States. According to the 2020 census, its population was 499 and it contained 223 housing units.

Historical population
Census	Pop.	Note	%±
1890	876		—
1900	851		−2.9%
1910	712		−16.3%
1920	644		−9.6%
1930	563		−12.6%
1940	641		13.9%
1950	569		−11.2%
1960	578		1.6%
1970	489		−15.4%
1980	442		−9.6%
1990	446		0.9%
2000	436		−2.2%
2010	481		10.3%
2020	499		3.7%
Source: US Decennial Census

== History ==
Pine Township was established in March 1830. There were originally four townships in the county; Pine and Washington were the first two new townships to be created.

Van Reed Farmstead was listed on the National Register of Historic Places in 2015.

== Geography ==
According to the 2010 census, the township has a total area of 36.16 square miles (93.7 km^{2}), of which 36.15 square miles (93.6 km^{2}) (or 99.97%) is land and 0.01 square miles (0.026 km^{2}) (or 0.03%) is water. Its only town is Rainsville, though a tiny hamlet named Brisco once existed to its west. Other extinct towns include Hooker Corner, Point Pleasant and Rocky Ford. The streams of Mud Pine Creek, Spring Branch and Stoney Creek run through this township.

Map of Pine Township

=== Cemeteries ===
The township contains these six cemeteries: Brisco, Gray, Hooker, Jones, Rainsville and Van Reed.

=== Transportation ===
U.S. Route 41 runs from north to south in the far western part of the township on its way to Attica. Indiana State Road 26 winds its way across the north part of the township on its route from the Illinois state line to Pine Village.

== Education ==
Pine Township is part of the Metropolitan School District of Warren County.

== Government ==
Pine Township has a trustee who administers rural fire protection and ambulance service, provides relief to the poor, manages cemetery care, and performs farm assessment, among other duties. The trustee is assisted in these duties by a three-member township board. The trustees and board members are elected to four-year terms.

Pine Township is part of Indiana's 8th congressional district, Indiana House of Representatives District 42, and Indiana State Senate District 38.
