= Point Pleasant, Indiana =

- Ghost town
- Location in Warren County
- Coordinates: 40°23′50″N 87°19′48″W
- Country: United States
- State: Indiana
- County: Warren
- Township: Steuben
- Time zone: UTC-5 (Eastern (EST))
  - Summer (DST): UTC-4 (EDT)
- Area code: 765

Point Pleasant was a small village (now extinct) in Pine Township, Warren County, Indiana, located about a mile and a half southwest of Rainsville near the confluence of Big Pine Creek and Mud Pine Creek, a site currently known as Rocky Ford. It was laid out by one John H. Bartlett and platted July 14, 1830, but never grew, and consisted only of Bartlett's residence, a liquor store and perhaps a saw mill. An 1883 county history describes Point Pleasant, but notes that "this was a paper town only."

== Geography ==
Point Pleasant is located in the northwest half of the northeast quarter of section 33, township 23, range 8.
