= Rainsville, Indiana =

- Unincorporated community and Census-designated place
- Location within Warren County, Indiana Location within Indiana Location within the United States
- Coordinates: 40°24′51″N 87°18′57″W
- Country: United States
- State: Indiana
- County: Warren
- Township: Pine
- Founded: 1833
- Founder: Isaac Rains

Area
  - Total: 0.20 sq mi (0.53 km^{2})
  - Land: 0.20 sq mi (0.53 km^{2})
- Elevation: 679 ft (207 m)

Population (2020)
  - Total: 28
  - Density: 135.8/sq mi (52.45/km^{2})
- Time zone: UTC-5 (Eastern (EST))
  - Summer (DST): UTC-4 (EDT)
- ZIP code: 47918
- Area code: 765
- GNIS feature ID: 2806548

Rainsville is a small unincorporated community in Pine Township, Warren County, in the U.S. state of Indiana. As of the 2020 census, Rainsville had a population of 28.

== History ==
Rainsville was platted on April 16, 1833, by Isaac Rains, who had built a mill here the previous year; the town was named for him. A post office was established on February 5, 1836, and closed on September 15, 1904.

== Geography ==
Rainsville is located 4 miles (6.4 km) southwest of Pine Village and 2.5 miles (4.0 km) east of U.S. Route 41. Big Pine Creek flows from Pine Village, around the north side of the town, and continues to the southwest.

== Demographics ==
Historical population
Census	Pop.	Note	%±
2020	28		—
U.S. Decennial Census

== Education ==
It is in the Metropolitan School District of Warren County.

== Gallery ==
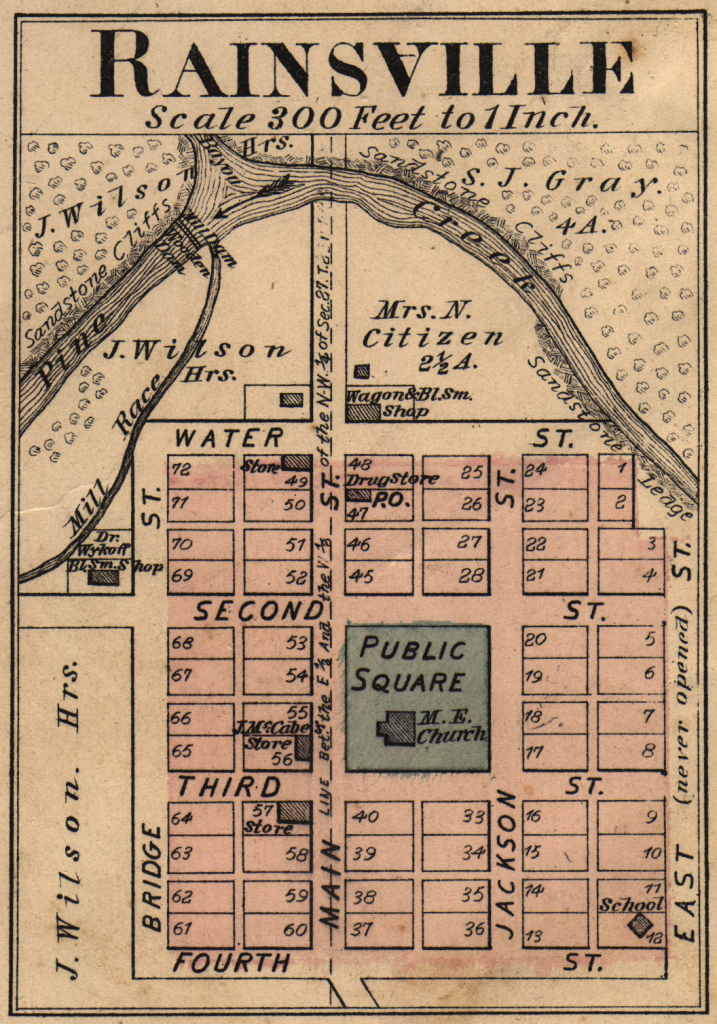
Map from 1877 atlas

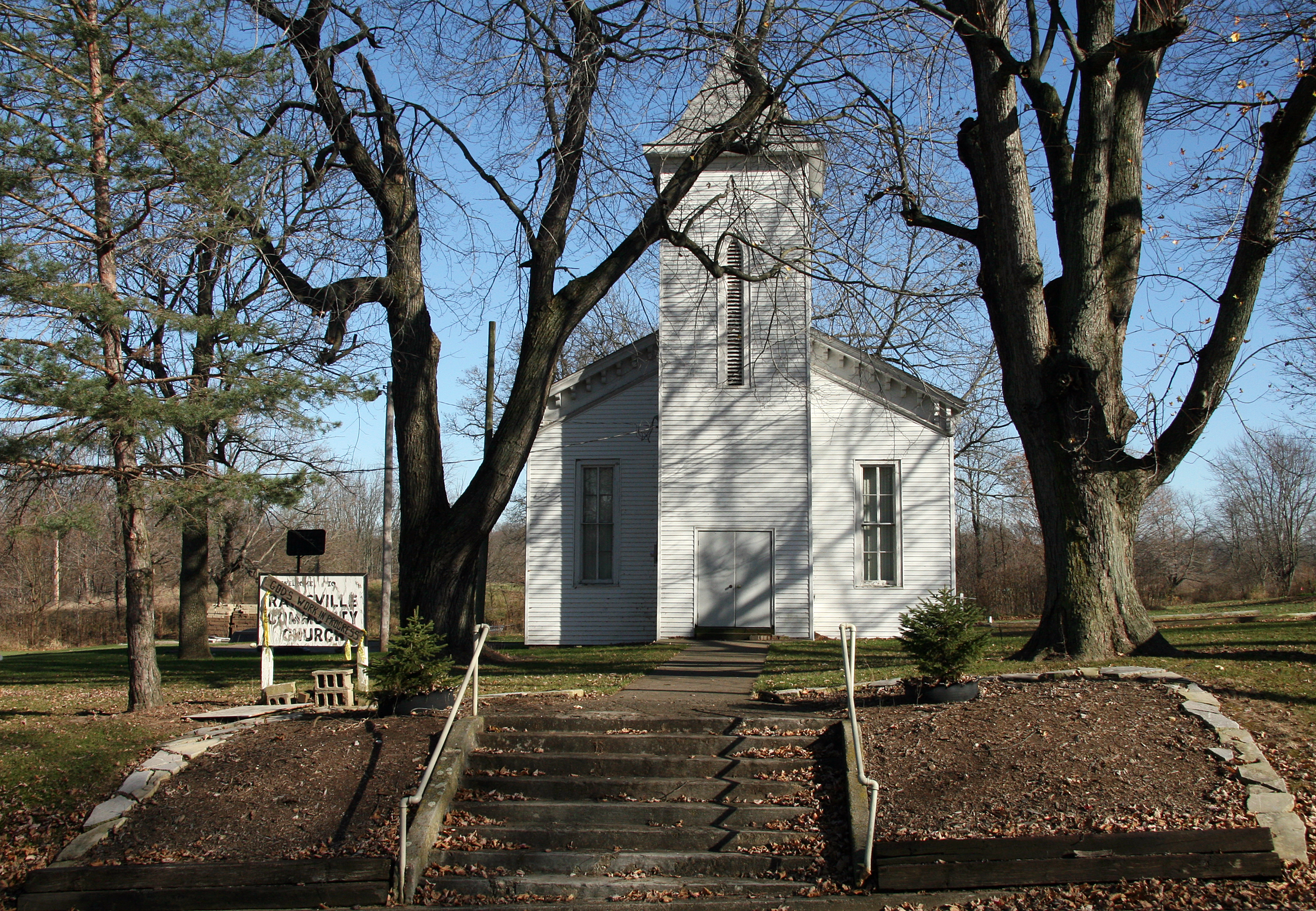
Rainsville Community Church

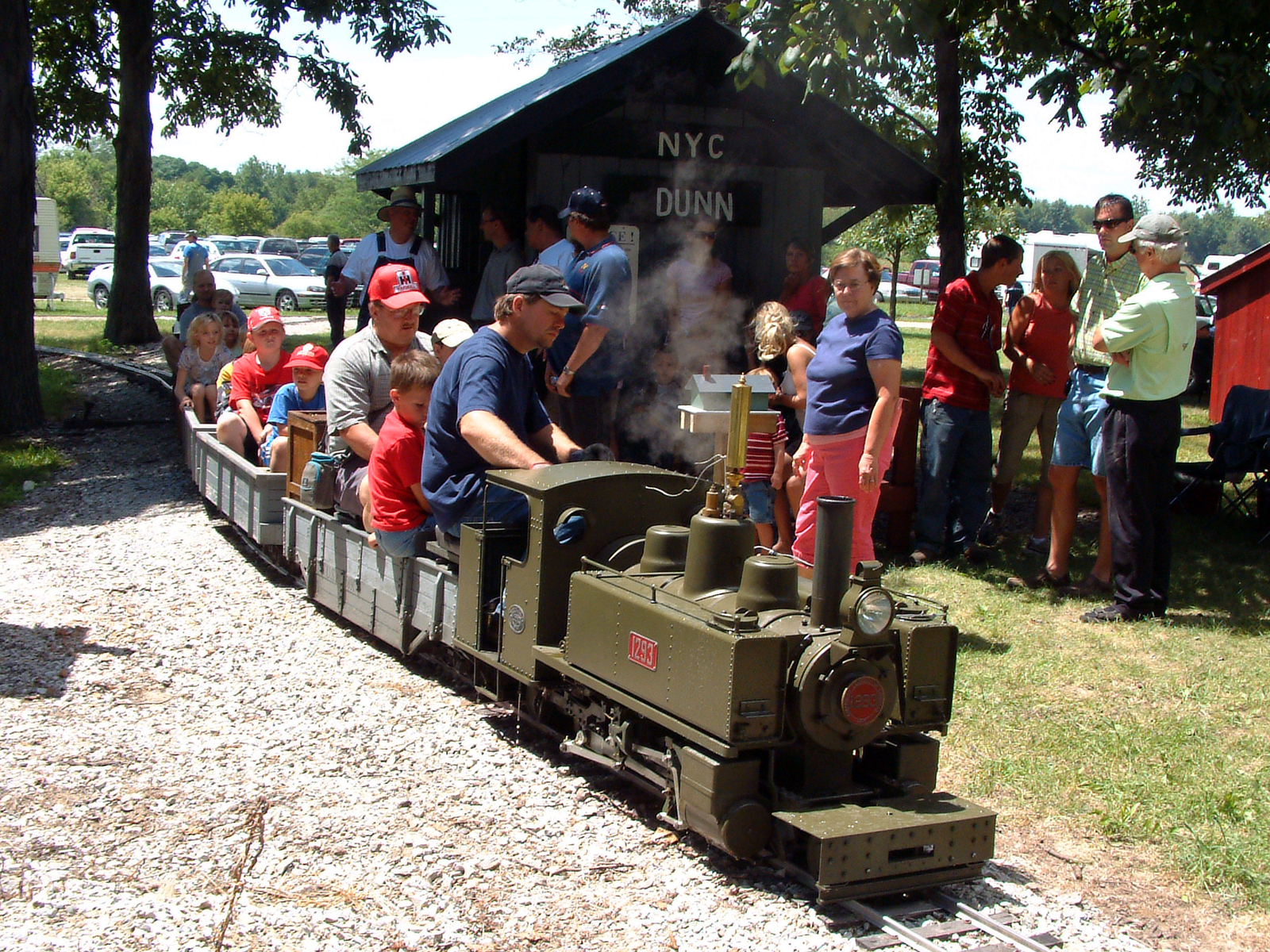
A miniature passenger train at the Illiana Antique Power Exhibition, one mile west of Rainsville.
