= Indiana State Road 154 =

State highway in Indiana, United States

State Road 154
- SR 154 highlighted in red

Route information
- Maintained by INDOT
- Length: 13.181 mi (21.213 km)

Major junctions
- West end: IL border near Hutsonville, IL
- SR 63 at Graysville
- East end: US 41 / US 150 at Sullivan

Location
- Country: United States
- State: Indiana
- Counties: Sullivan

Highway system
- Indiana State Highway System; Interstate; US; State; Scenic
← SR 152	→ SR 156

State Road 154, in the U.S. state of Indiana, is a short two-lane east–west highway located in western Sullivan County.

== Route description ==
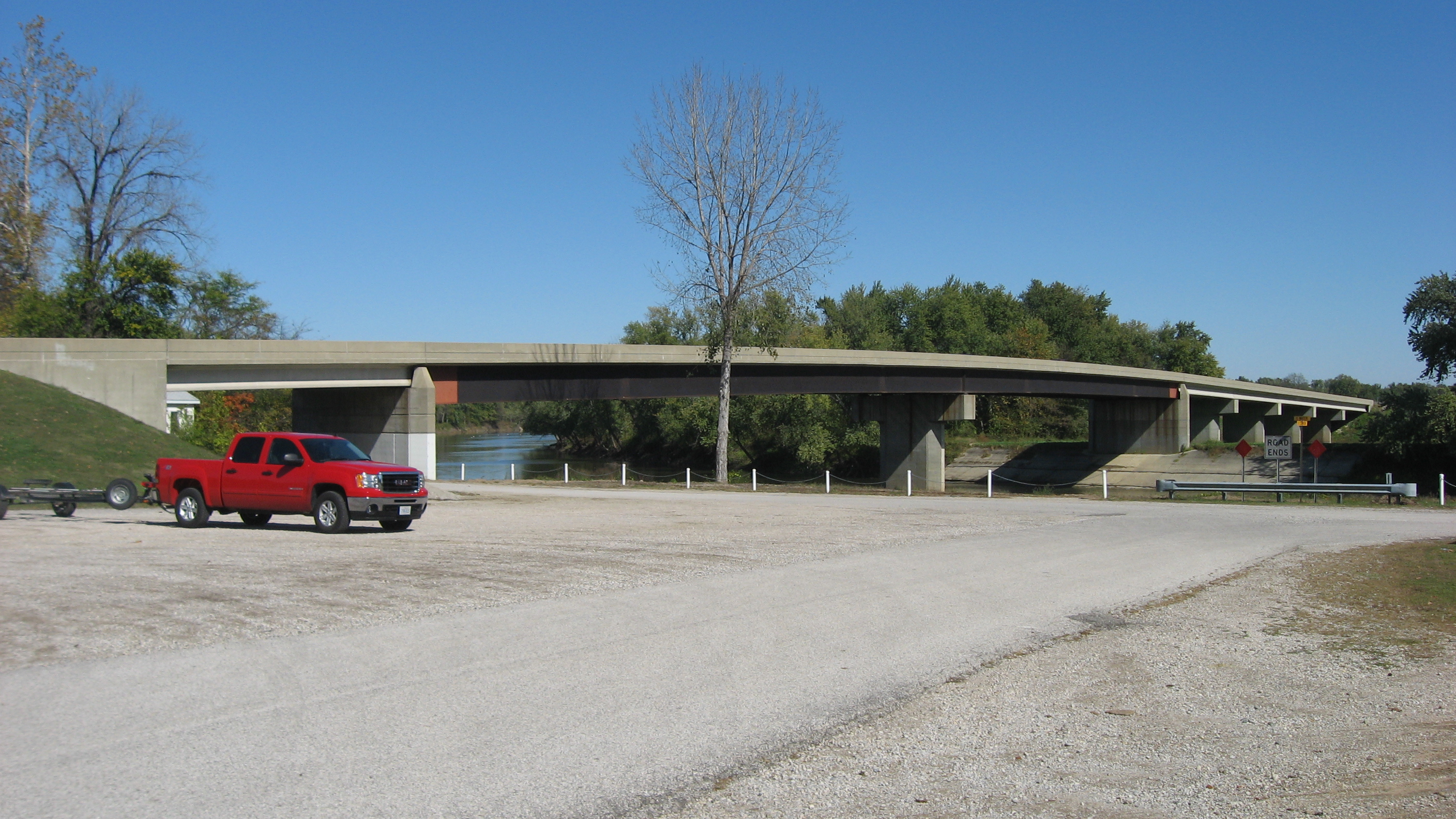
Wabash River bridge

State Road 154 begins at the Wabash River bridge across from Hutsonville, Illinois, and runs eastward through Graysville, where it crosses State Road 63. It ends where it meets U.S. Route 41 just west of Sullivan.

== Major intersections ==
County	Location	mi	km	Destinations	Notes
Crawford	Hutsonville	0.000	0.000	Clover Street	Western terminus of SR 154 at the Illinois border
Wabash River		0.008	0.013		
Sullivan	Graysville	5.728	9.218	SR 63 – Merom, Terre Haute	
Sullivan	Sullivan	13.181	21.213	US 41 / US 150 – Vincennes, Terre Haute	Eastern terminus of SR 154
1.000 mi = 1.609 km; 1.000 km = 0.621 mi
