= Van Reed Farmstead =

- U.S. National Register of Historic Places
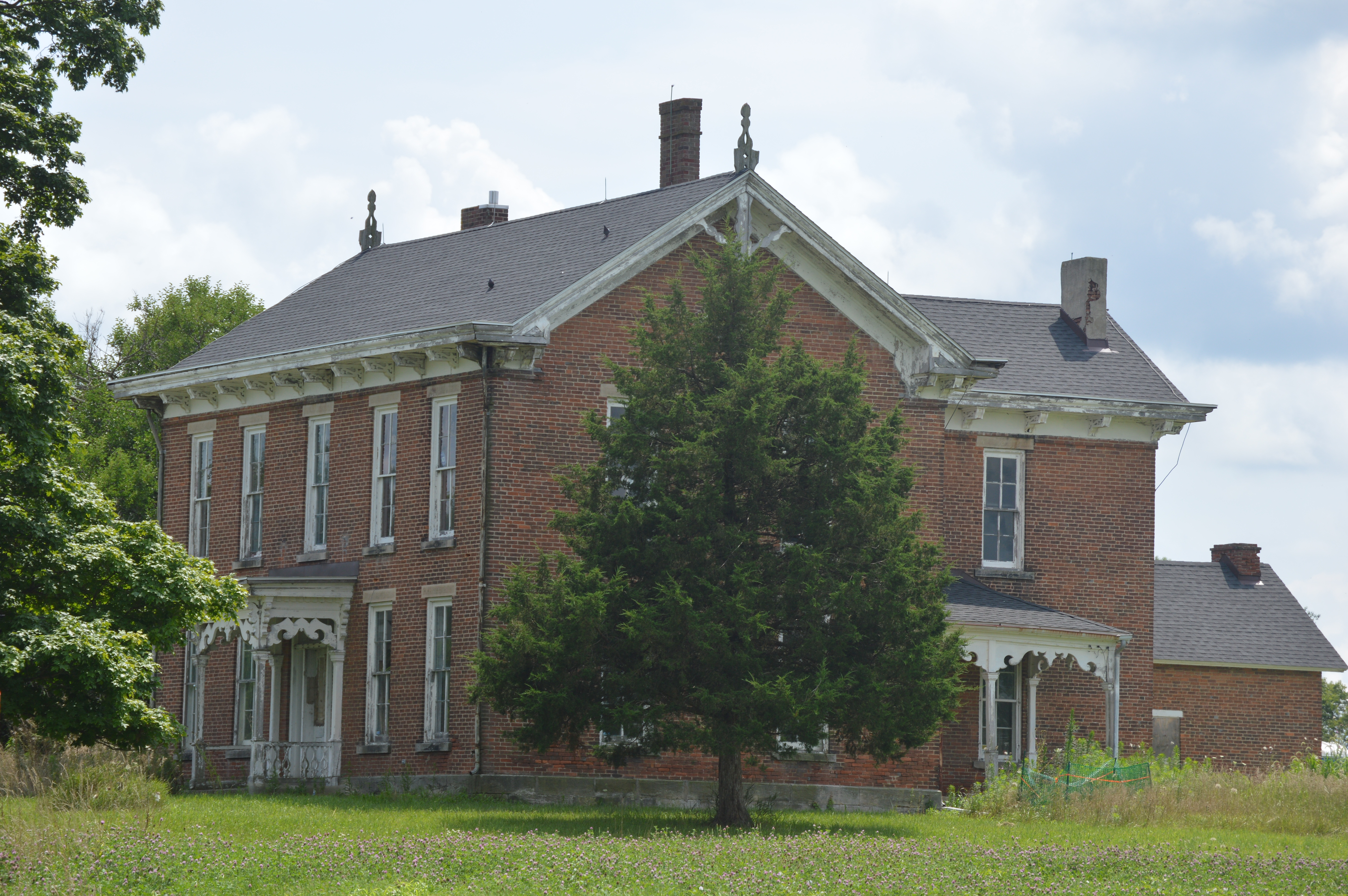
- Front and northern side

- Location within Warren County, Indiana Location within Indiana Location within the United States
- Location: 5322 Old U.S. Route 41, Pine Township, Warren County, Indiana
- Coordinates: 40°23′38″N 87°21′12″W
- Area: 2.4 acres (0.97 ha)
- Built: 1855
- Architectural style: Greek Revival
- NRHP reference No.: 15000601
- Added to NRHP: September 14, 2015

Van Reed Farmstead is a historic home and farm located in Pine Township, Warren County, Indiana. The farmhouse was built in 1856, and is a large two-story, double pile Greek Revival style brick dwelling. It has a cut stone foundation and a two-story rear wing. Also on the property are the contributing summer kitchen (1856), two well pits (1856), and a Sweitzer barn (1856).

It was listed on the National Register of Historic Places in 2015.
