= Liberty Township, Warren County, Indiana =

Liberty Township
- Township
- Location of Liberty Township in Warren County

- Location of Indiana in the United States
- Coordinates: 40°20′36″N 87°19′40″W
- Country: United States
- State: Indiana
- County: Warren

Government
  - Type: Indiana township

Area
  - Total: 44.02 sq mi (114.0 km^{2})
  - Land: 44 sq mi (110 km^{2})
  - Water: 0.02 sq mi (0.052 km^{2}) 0.05%
- Elevation: 679 ft (207 m)

Population (2020)
  - Total: 861
  - Density: 20/sq mi (7.6/km^{2})
- Time zone: UTC-5 (Eastern (EST))
  - Summer (DST): UTC-4 (EDT)
- Area code: 765
- GNIS feature ID: 453565

Liberty Township is one of twelve townships in Warren County, Indiana, United States. According to the 2020 census, its population was 861 and it contained 370 housing units.

Historical population
Census	Pop.	Note	%±
1890	1,239		—
1900	1,365		10.2%
1910	1,408		3.2%
1920	1,126		−20.0%
1930	1,033		−8.3%
1940	1,057		2.3%
1950	935		−11.5%
1960	912		−2.5%
1970	866		−5.0%
1980	811		−6.4%
1990	680		−16.2%
2000	850		25.0%
2010	896		5.4%
2020	861		−3.9%
Source: US Decennial Census

== History ==
Liberty Township was formed in March 1843.

The Andrew Brier House was listed on the National Register of Historic Places in 1986.

== Geography ==
According to the 2010 census, the township has a total area of 44.02 square miles (114.0 km^{2}), of which 44 square miles (110 km^{2}) (or 99.95%) is land and 0.02 square miles (0.052 km^{2}) (or 0.05%) is water. It contains the Potholes at Fall Creek Gorge, a scenic natural location owned and maintained by the Nature Conservancy. Big Pine Creek enters the township from Adams Township to the north and winds to the southeast, briefly entering Warren Township before emptying into the Wabash River near Attica. The stream of Fall Creek also runs through this township.

The north end of the county seat of Williamsport extends into the southeast corner of the township. In addition, there are three small unincorporated towns in the township. Carbondale is located just north of the point where State Road 63 begins at U.S. Route 41. Judyville is about 2 miles (3.2 km) west of Carbondale, near the western border of the township. Kramer is located about 3 miles (4.8 km) east-southeast of Carbondale, near the site of the Hotel Mudlavia. The settlement of Five Points is now defunct, but existed along the present-day route of U.S. Route 41 in the southeastern part of the township.

Map of Liberty Township

=== Cemeteries ===
The township contains these five cemeteries: Bartlett, Brier, Goodwine, Kester and McCabe.

=== Transportation ===
U.S. Route 41 enters the township from the north and makes its way to the southeast toward Attica. Indiana State Road 63 begins at U.S. 41 near the middle of the township, and heads to the southwest; Indiana State Road 263 leaves State Road 63 about 3 miles (4.8 km) to the southwest and goes south through West Lebanon, re-joining its parent at the south end of the county. Indiana State Road 28 passes into the southeast corner of the township from Williamsport and leaves on its way to Attica. Indiana State Road 55 runs along the township's eastern border on its way from Attica in the south to Pine Village in the north.

== Education ==
Liberty Township is part of the Metropolitan School District of Warren County.

== Government ==
Liberty Township has a trustee who administers rural fire protection and ambulance service, provides relief to the poor, manages cemetery care, and performs farm assessment, among other duties. The trustee is assisted in these duties by a three-member township board. The trustees and board members are elected to four-year terms.

Liberty Township is part of Indiana's 4th congressional district, Indiana House of Representatives District 42, and Indiana State Senate District 38.
