= Judyville, Indiana =

- Unincorporated community and Census-designated place
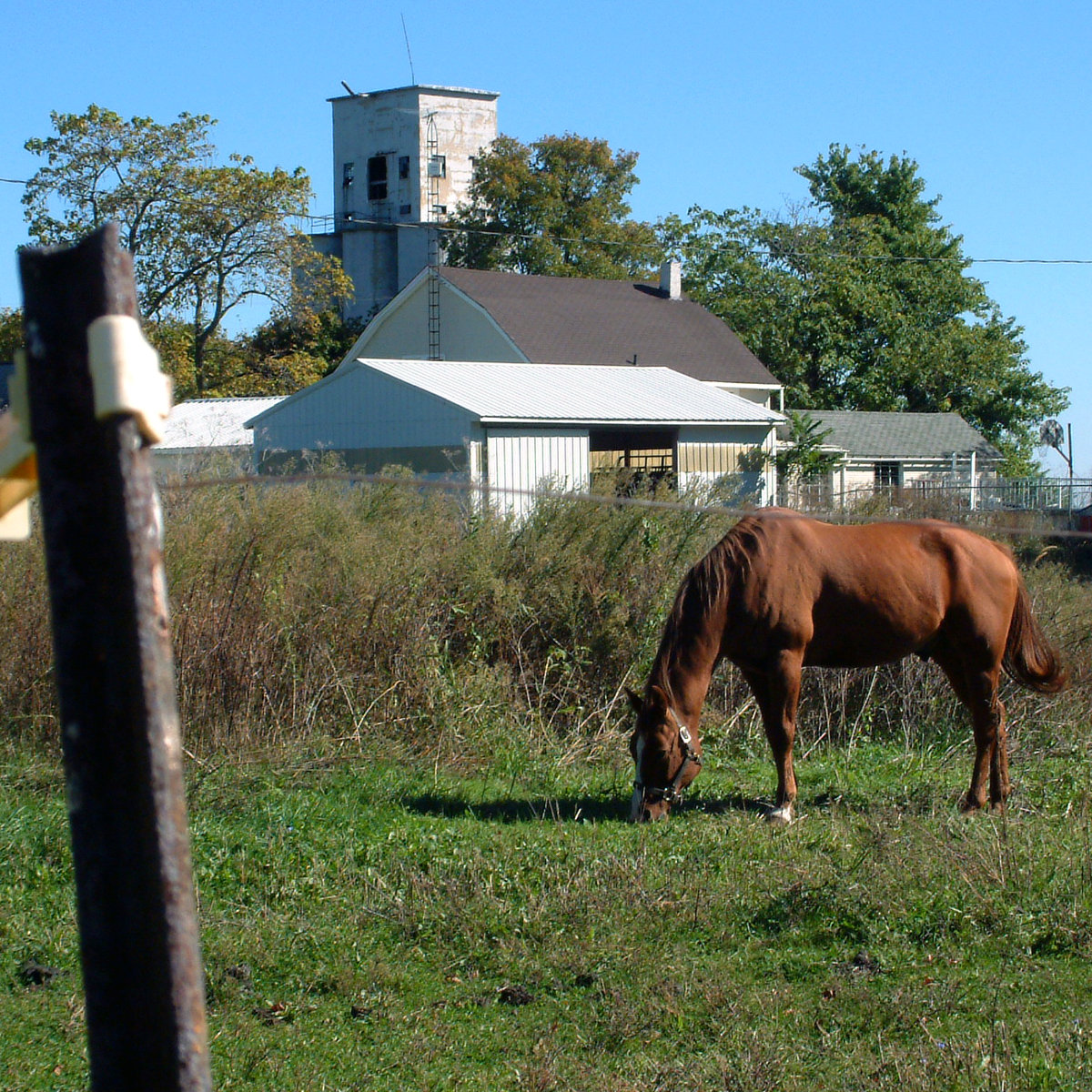
- Looking toward the Judyville grain elevator

- Location within Warren County, Indiana Location within Indiana Location within the United States
- Coordinates: 40°21′30″N 87°23′49″W
- Country: United States
- State: Indiana
- County: Warren
- Township: Liberty
- Founded: 1903
- Founded by: John F. Judy

Area
  - Total: 0.13 sq mi (0.33 km^{2})
  - Land: 0.13 sq mi (0.33 km^{2})
- Elevation: 764 ft (233 m)

Population (2020)
  - Total: 38
  - Density: 296.7/sq mi (114.56/km^{2})
- Time zone: UTC-5 (Eastern (EST))
  - Summer (DST): UTC-4 (EDT)
- ZIP code: 47993
- Area code: 765
- GNIS feature ID: 2806506

Judyville is a small unincorporated community in Liberty Township, Warren County, in the U.S. state of Indiana. As of the 2020 census, Judyville had a population of 38.

== History ==
Judyville's founder John Finley Judy, born in Ohio on 18 March 1856, arrived in Warren County in 1867 with his parents Skillman and Sarah. (The Judy surname was an anglicization of the German Tschudi.) John attended high school in Attica and afterwards taught school for several years. In 1881 he invested the money he earned from teaching into cattle, then leveraged the profits to establish himself as a farmer and an entrepreneur. The subjects of Judy's enterprises were diverse and included livestock, vehicles, farming equipment, groceries, dry goods and various supplies, blacksmithing, undertaking, grain elevators and real estate.

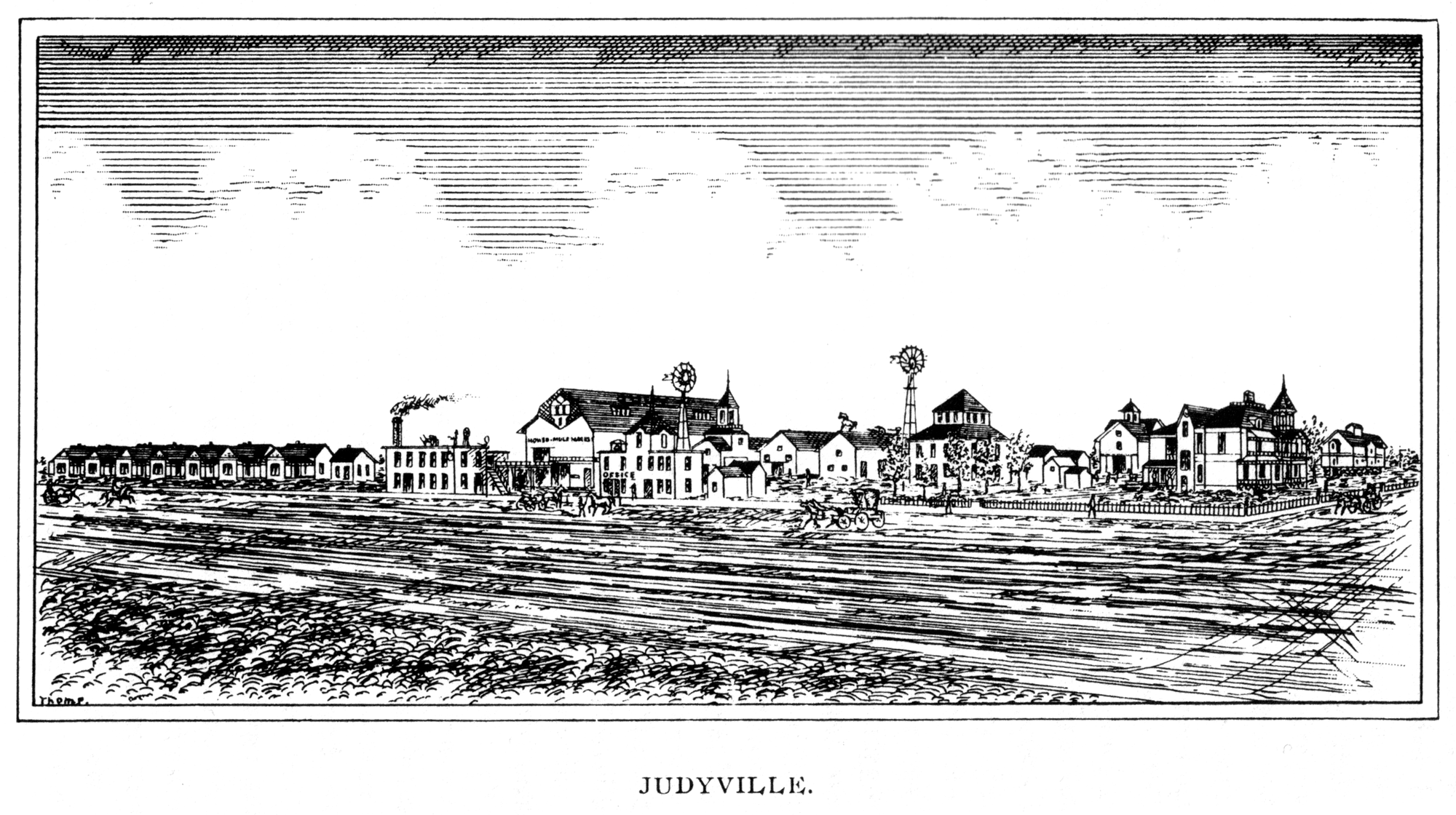
A sketch of Judyville in the late 19th century

By the turn of the century, Judy's farm in Liberty Township (already known by that time as Judyville) had become an industrial village containing "six barns, one of them being the largest in Warren County, thirteen dwelling houses, a hotel, an office building and numerous outbuildings ... provided with telephonic communication, there being ten distinct lines of operation.". The site being remote, Judy convinced the Chicago and Eastern Illinois Railroad to build an eight-mile-long rail line to his farm from their trunk in Vermilion County, Illinois, and also minted a limited form of currency known as "Judy Money" which was accepted both in the village and throughout the Warren County area.

On 9 February 1903, John Judy officially platted the town of Judyville. The town gained a post office on 1 October 1903, with John's son Ole Ruppert Judy as the first postmaster. It operated until 6 January 1961. John married Matilda Ann Hunter on 16 December 1877 and died 12 October 1931. His home in Judyville stood for many years, but was accidentally destroyed by fire on 1 August 2001 while being remodeled.

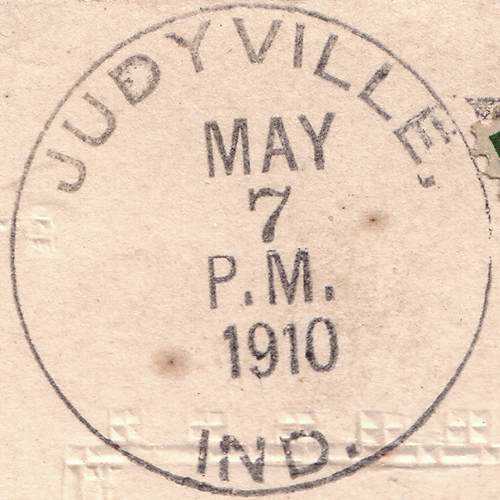
A 1910 postmark

The commerce and industry that once flourished at Judyville faded during the 20th century, in common with the decline of many rural Midwestern communities. The town is now entirely residential.

== Geography ==
Judyville is located along the western border of the township, about 7 miles (11 km) northwest of the county seat of Williamsport in fertile farmland and sits on a gentle rise with an elevation of approximately 770 feet. Spring Branch creek starts just to the north of town, and Fall Creek, which flows over Indiana's tallest waterfall in Williamsport, starts to its south. The town is located on County Road 300 North, a quarter-mile east of County Road 425 West.

== Demographics ==
Historical population
Census	Pop.	Note	%±
2020	38		—
U.S. Decennial Census

== Education ==
It is in the Metropolitan School District of Warren County.
