= Adams Township, Warren County, Indiana =

Township in Indiana, United States

Adams Township
- Township
- Location of Adams Township in Warren County

- Location of Indiana in the United States
- Coordinates: 40°26′28″N 87°14′41″W
- Country: United States
- State: Indiana
- County: Warren
- Named for: John Quincy Adams

Government
  - Type: Indiana township

Area
  - Total: 26.99 sq mi (69.9 km^{2})
  - Land: 26.99 sq mi (69.9 km^{2})
  - Water: 0 sq mi (0 km^{2})
- Elevation: 720 ft (220 m)

Population (2020)
  - Total: 535
  - Density: 19.8/sq mi (7.65/km^{2})
- Time zone: UTC-5 (Eastern (EST))
  - Summer (DST): UTC-4 (EDT)
- Area code: 765
- GNIS feature ID: 453082

Adams Township is one of twelve townships in Warren County, Indiana. According to the 2020 census, its population was 535 and it contained 243 housing units.

Historical population
Census	Pop.	Note	%±
1890	792		—
1900	893		12.8%
1910	945		5.8%
1920	859		−9.1%
1930	797		−7.2%
1940	778		−2.4%
1950	780		0.3%
1960	712		−8.7%
1970	679		−4.6%
1980	578		−14.9%
1990	493		−14.7%
2000	561		13.8%
2010	512		−8.7%
2020	535		4.5%
Source: US Decennial Census

== History ==
Adams Township was formed in 1848 and was named after the sixth president of the United States, John Quincy Adams.

== Geography ==
According to the 2010 census, the township has a total area of 26.99 square miles (69.9 km^{2}), all land. Its only town is Pine Village in the northwest part of the township, though a tiny hamlet named Chatterton stood southeast of Pine Village in the early part of the 20th century.

Big Pine Creek enters the township from Benton County to the north and passes just to the northwest of Pine Village and continues southwest, emptying into the Wabash River near Attica.

Map of Adams Township

=== Cemeteries ===
The township contains three cemeteries. Mound (or Round) Cemetery is about 4 miles southeast of Pine Village and is in the form of a mound about 30 feet (9.1 m) high; county roads 700 N and 600 E intersect here and form a circle around the mound. Harman Cemetery is less than a mile further to the southeast. Quaker Cemetery is southwest of Chatterton.

=== Transportation ===
Two highways, Indiana State Road 26 and Indiana State Road 55, intersect in Pine Village; State Road 26 begins at the Illinois border and continues east to Lafayette in Tippecanoe County, while State Road 55 enters from Attica to the south and continues north to Oxford in neighboring Benton County.

== Education ==
Adams Township is part of the Metropolitan School District of Warren County. It contains one of the three elementary schools in the county, located in Pine Village.

== Government ==
Adams Township has a trustee who administers rural fire protection and ambulance service, provides relief to the poor, manages cemetery care, and performs farm assessment, among other duties. The trustee is assisted in these duties by a three-member township board. The trustees and board members are elected to four-year terms.

Adams Township is part of Indiana's 8th congressional district, Indiana House of Representatives District 26, and Indiana State Senate District 38.
