= Carbondale, Indiana =

- Unincorporated community
- Location within Warren County, Indiana Location within Indiana Location within the United States
- Coordinates: 40°21′36″N 87°20′52″W
- Country: United States
- State: Indiana
- County: Warren
- Township: Liberty
- Elevation: 689 ft (210 m)
- Time zone: UTC-5 (Eastern (EST))
  - Summer (DST): UTC-4 (EDT)
- ZIP code: 47993
- Area code: 765
- GNIS feature ID: 432124

Carbondale is an unincorporated community in Liberty Township, Warren County, in the U.S. state of Indiana.

== History ==
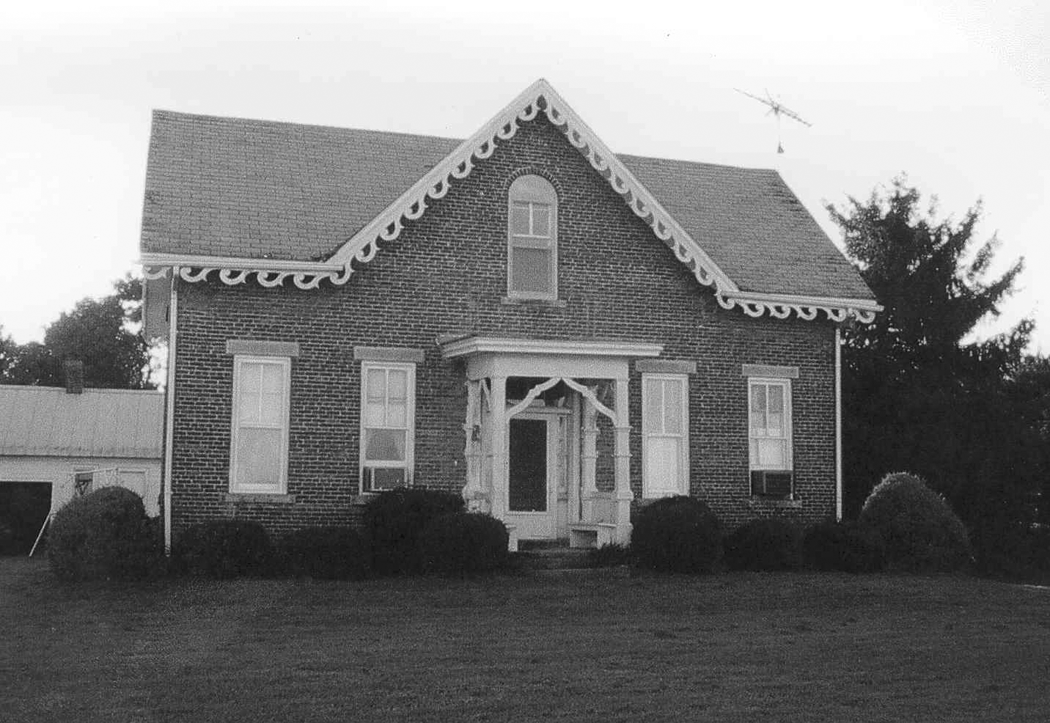
The Nelson Burr home near Carbondale, built in 1857

Carbondale was known as Clark's Cross Roads at least as early as 1846; later it was called Free Hall. The discovery of coal in the town's vicinity led to the current name being applied in 1873. The first house was built here in 1854 by John Thompson; another was built the next year by Andrew Brier, and a church was constructed in 1867.

A post office was established in 1855 under the name Clark's Cross Roads, and was discontinued in 1858. In 1873, another post office was established with the name Carbondale but was also discontinued, in 1904.

== Geography ==
Carbondale is located just east of the intersection of U.S. Route 41 and State Road 63, about 6 miles north-northwest of the county seat of Williamsport. The scenic Big Pine Creek flows about a mile and a half east of town.
