= State Line City, Indiana =

- Town
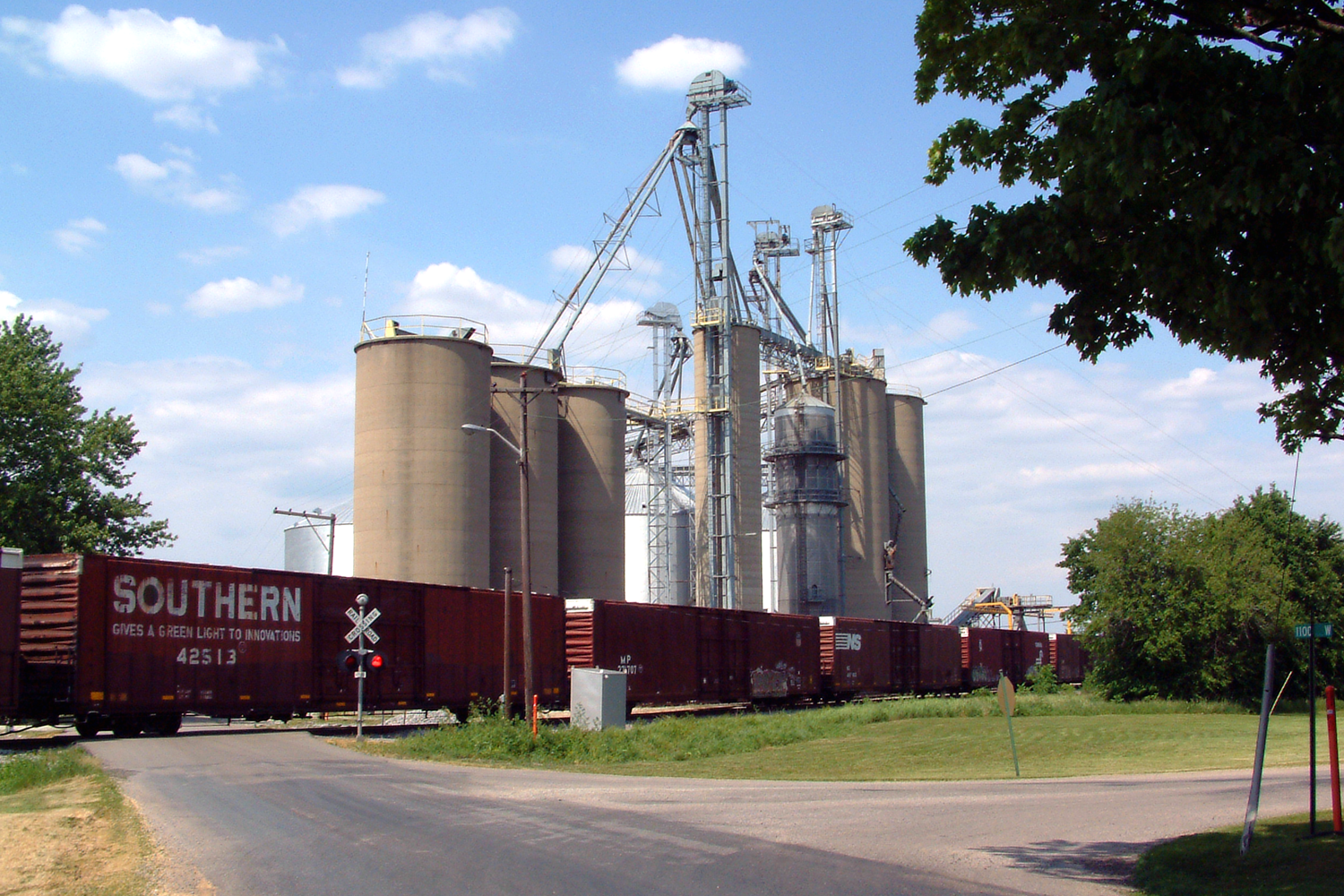
- A freight train passing State Line's grain elevators

- Location within Warren County, Indiana Location within Indiana Location within the United States
- Coordinates: 40°11′50″N 87°31′37″W
- Country: United States
- State: Indiana
- County: Warren
- Township: Kent
- Founded: 1857

Area
  - Total: 0.14 sq mi (0.36 km^{2})
  - Land: 0.14 sq mi (0.36 km^{2})
  - Water: 0 sq mi (0.00 km^{2})
- Elevation: 719 ft (219 m)

Population (2020)
  - Total: 120
  - Density: 862.3/sq mi (332.94/km^{2})
- Time zone: UTC-5 (Eastern (EST))
  - Summer (DST): UTC-4 (EDT)
- ZIP code: 47982
- Area code: 765
- FIPS code: 18-72764
- GNIS feature ID: 2397679

State Line City is a town in Kent Township, Warren County, Indiana, United States, situated along the state's boundary with Illinois. As of the 2020 census, the population was 120.

== History ==
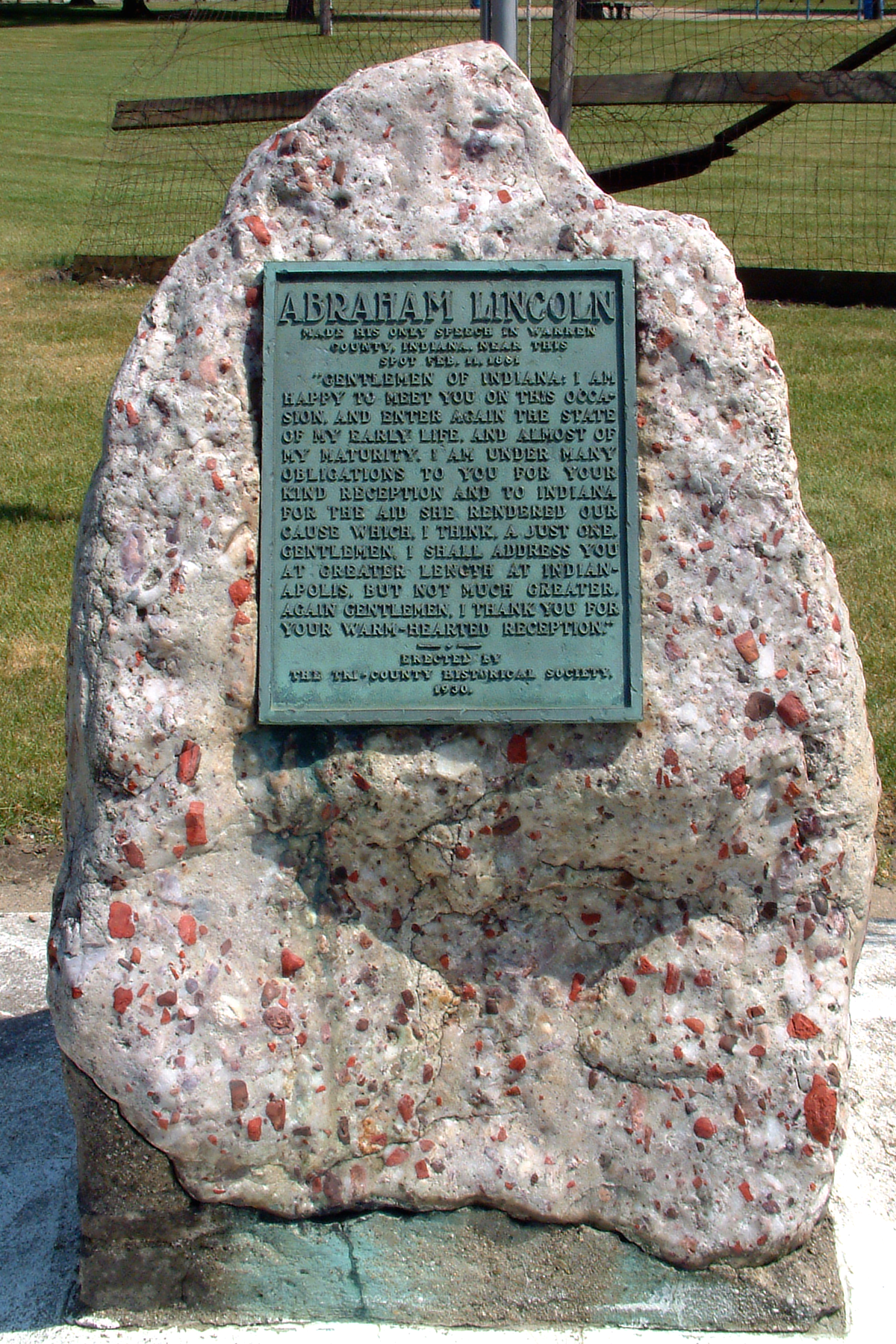
A marker commemorates Lincoln's speech.

In the mid-1850s, two large railway lines converged on the Indiana-Illinois state line – the narrow-gauge Toledo, Wabash and Western Railway (later the Wabash Railroad), whose route from the east crossed Warren County and reached the state line in October 1856, and the standard-gauge Great Western Railroad, which shortly thereafter reached the state line from the west. State Line City was platted on June 29, 1857, by Robert Casement at the convergence of these two railroads. The city flourished, and within 10 years had reached a population of approximately 550, but because of the drinking and carousing of the numerous railroaders it gained an unsavory reputation.

On February 11, 1861, Abraham Lincoln stopped in State Line on his way from Springfield, Illinois, to Washington, D.C., for his inauguration. He dined at the Frazier Eating House, then gave a short speech to a crowd in the public square before resuming his journey. A historical marker on the site commemorates the event, and records the words which Lincoln spoke:

Gentlemen of Indiana: I am happy to meet you on this occasion, and enter again the state of my early life, and almost of my maturity. I am under many obligations to you for your kind reception and to Indiana for the aid she rendered our cause which, I think, a just one. Gentlemen, I shall address you at greater length at Indianapolis, but not much greater. Again, gentlemen, I thank you for your warm-hearted reception.

The town's post office was established in July 1857, with Robert Casement as the first postmaster, and continues to operate today from a newer building on Woodard Street. Grain elevators were erected in the fall of 1857, but fires in September 1900, December 1932 and June 1984 each completely destroyed the structures, which were subsequently rebuilt. State Line's grain elevators are currently operated by Archer Daniels Midland of Decatur, Illinois, and see considerable activity during harvest time. The town's other large business is a fertilizer and agricultural sales facility northeast of town, built in 1975 and currently operated by Westland Co-Op.

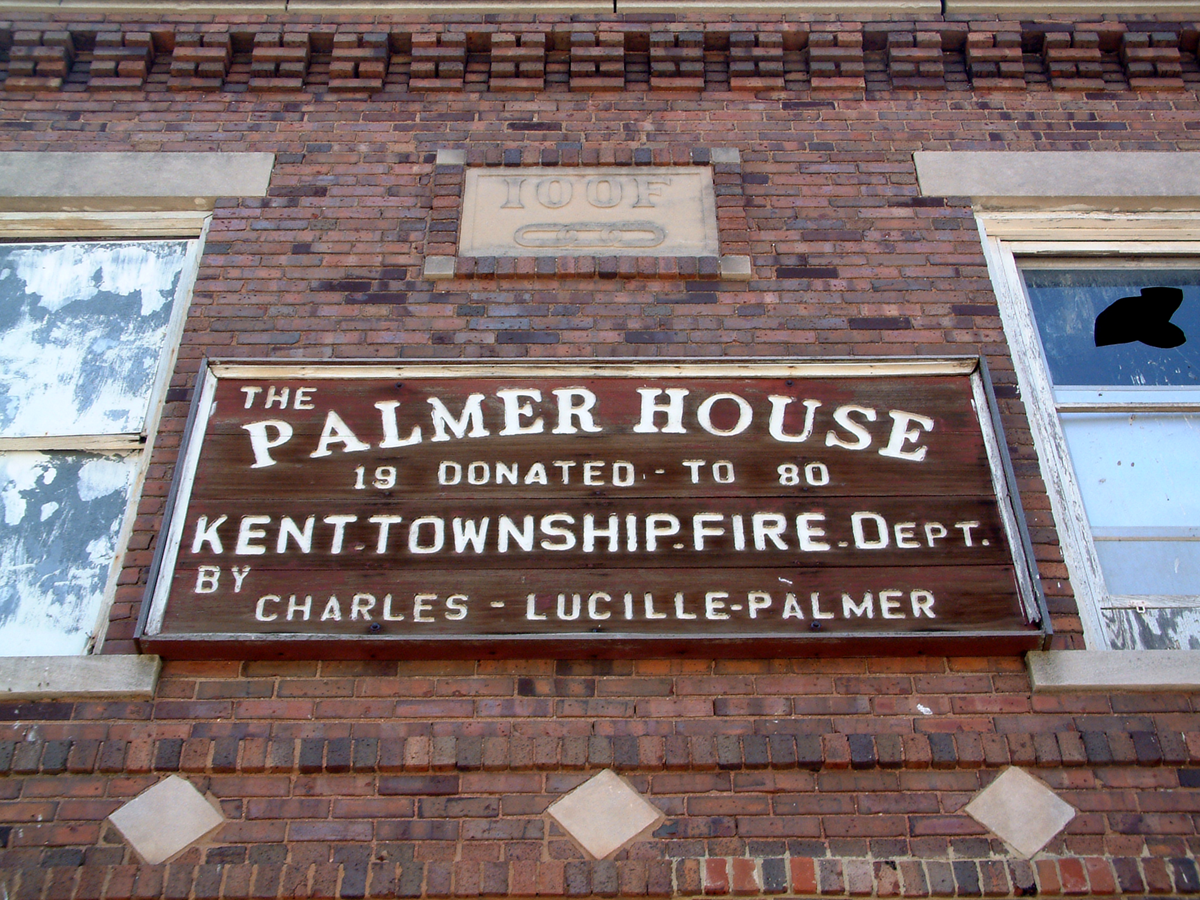
The Palmer House, originally an Odd Fellows hall

Other establishments in State Line include the Kent Township Fire Department, formed in 1978, which took over local fire protection responsibilities from the West Lebanon Fire Department; in 2000, however, the department merged back with West Lebanon, which now maintains the State Line fire station. The KTFD sponsored for a number of years an annual town festival called the State Line Fun Days, but this is no longer held.

As of 2007, State Line has one active church: the State Line Christian Church, built in 1868. Rev. Gerald Burt has been the pastor there since 1972. The Church of the Nazarene (built around 1860 as a Presbyterian church and purchased for use as a Nazarene church in 1929) and the Methodist Church (built in 1863–4) were both disbanded due to low attendance in the 1990s and have since been turned into homes. Rev. Jim Kessler was the last pastor at the Nazarene church.

== Geography ==
Map of State Line City

State Line City is located in the southwestern part of the county in open farm land along the border with Illinois, five miles northeast of the city of Danville, Illinois. According to the 2010 census, State Line City has a total area of 0.14 square miles (0.36 km^{2}), all land.

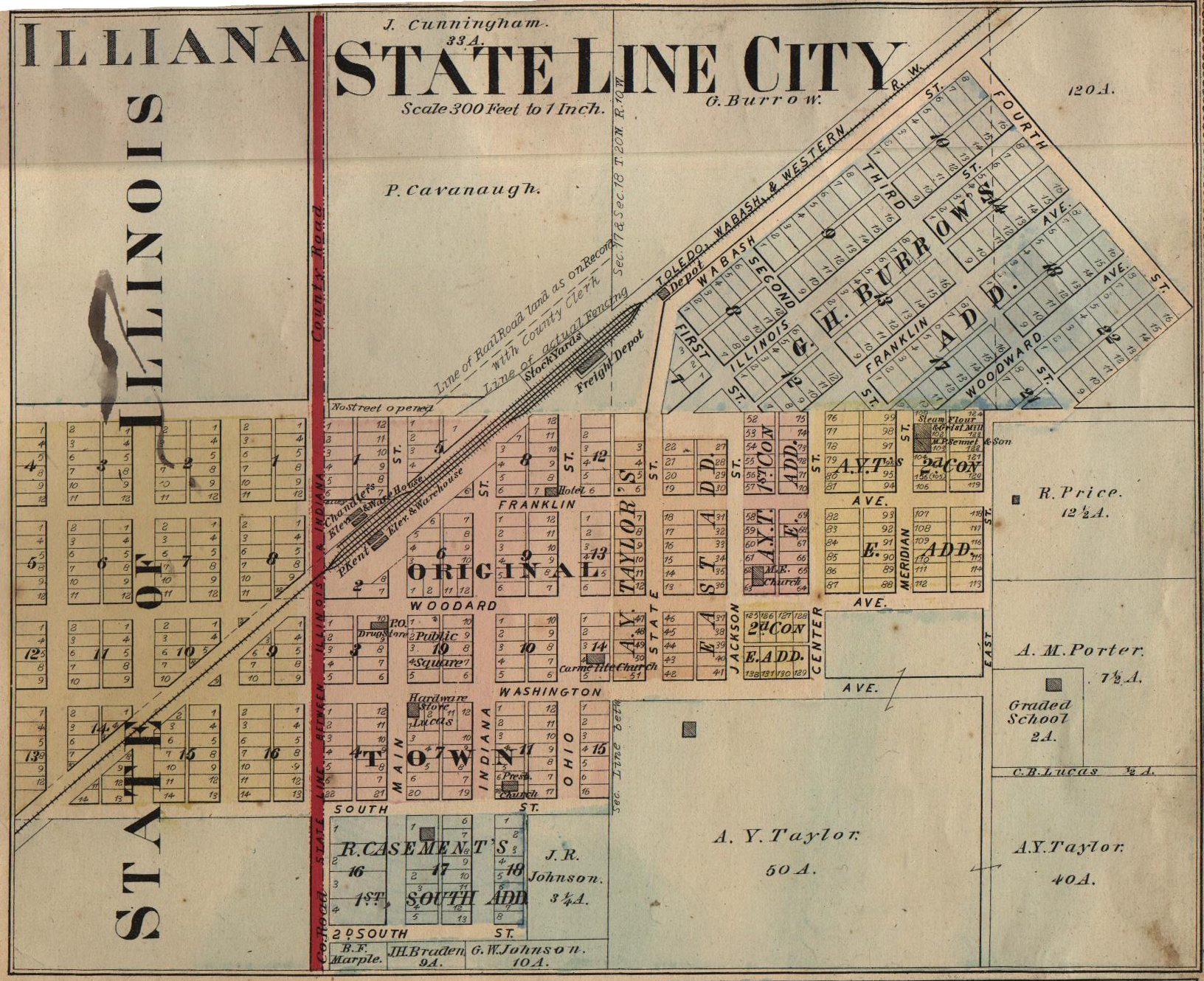
Map from 1877 atlas

The Norfolk Southern Railway runs southwest through town. For many years the famous Wabash Cannon Ball ran on the line (then owned by the Wabash Railway), passing through town twice a day on its route from St. Louis to Detroit and back. The Wabash Railway merged in the mid-1960s with the Norfolk and Western Railway, which in turn merged with Southern Railway in the 1980s to become Norfolk Southern, officially bringing an end to the Wabash name.

The section of the community west of the state line is Illiana.

== Demographics ==
Historical population
Census	Pop.	Note	%±
1880	268		—
1890	201		−25.0%
1900	174		−13.4%
1910	194		11.5%
1920	178		−8.2%
1930	165		−7.3%
1940	157		−4.8%
1950	152		−3.2%
1960	171		12.5%
1970	176		2.9%
1980	233		32.4%
1990	182		−21.9%
2000	141		−22.5%
2010	143		1.4%
2020	120		−16.1%
U.S. Decennial Census

As of the 2010 United States census, there were 143 people, 60 households, and 41 families residing here. The population density was 1,027.6 inhabitants per square mile (396.8/km^{2}). There were 70 housing units at an average density of 503.0 per square mile (194.2/km^{2}). The racial makeup was 98.6% white, 0.7% black or African American, 0.0% from other races, and 0.7% from two or more races. Those of Hispanic or Latino origin made up 0.7% of the population. In terms of ancestry, 32.8% were German, 13.9% were Swedish, 11.5% were Irish, 9.8% were American, and 9.8% were English.

Of the 60 households, 26.7% had children under the age of 18 living with them, 55.0% were married couples living together, 8.3% had a female householder with no husband present, 31.7% were non-families, and 28.3% of all households were made up of individuals. The average household size was 2.38 and the average family size was 2.85. The median age was 46.1 years.

The median income for a household was $48,750 and the median income for a family was $62,083. Males had a median income of $58,750 versus $36,250 for females. The per capita income for was $26,957. About 17.4% of families and 17.2% of the population were below the poverty line, including 0.0% of those under age 18 and 0.0% of those age 65 or over.

== Education ==
It is in the Metropolitan School District of Warren County.
