= Indiana State Road 63 =

Highway in Indiana

State Road 63
- SR 63 highlighted in red; the gap represents the relinquished portion

Route information
- Maintained by INDOT
- Length: 79.555 mi (128.031 km)
- Existed: 1970s–present

Major junctions
- South end: SR 58 in Merom
- SR 246 in Prairie Creek; US 150 in Terre Haute; US 41 in Terre Haute; US 36 near Montezuma; I-74 near Covington; US 136 near Covington
- North end: US 41 in Carbondale

Location
- Country: United States
- State: Indiana
- Counties: Sullivan, Vigo, Vermillion, Warren

Highway system
- Indiana State Highway System; Interstate; US; State; Scenic
← SR 62	→ I-64

State Road 63 (SR 63) in the U.S. state of Indiana is a north–south route in the western portion of the state. Until mid-2008, it covered a distance of just over 96 miles (154 km), but now is a discontinuous route. For 63 miles (101 km), from the city of Terre Haute until it rejoins U.S. Route 41 (US 41) near Carbondale, it is a four-lane divided highway and replaces US 41 as the major north–south artery in this portion of the state.

== Route description ==
Only the divided highway section of SR 63 from US 41 in Terre Haute to US 41 north of Attica is included as a part of the National Highway System (NHS), a network of highways identified as being most important for the economy, mobility and defense of the nation. The highway is maintained by the Indiana Department of Transportation (INDOT) like all other state roads and US highways in the state. The department tracks the traffic volumes along all state highways as a part of its maintenance responsibilities using a metric called average annual daily traffic (AADT). This measurement is a calculation of the traffic level along a segment of roadway for any average day of the year. In 2010, INDOT figured that lowest traffic levels were the 700 vehicles and 40 commercial vehicles used the highway daily near the southern terminus. The peak traffic volumes were 14,900 vehicles and 1,980 commercial vehicles AADT along the section of SR 63 immediately north of the US 41 in Terre Haute.

=== Southern section ===
SR 63 starts in the small town of Merom in Sullivan County at the western terminus of SR 58. The highway heads east from the southern terminus on Poplar Street and takes a sharp curve heading due north. The road heads north on Fifth Street leaving Merorn and the highway becomes a narrow two-lane rural highway. The road passes through farmland with a few houses along the way towards Prairie Creek. The highway passes through an intersection with SR 154. North of SR 154, the route begins to turn more northeasterly, before turning due north again. The road has an intersection with the western terminus of SR 48. The northern terminus of the southern section of SR 63 is at an all-way stop with the western terminus of SR 246.

=== Northern section ===
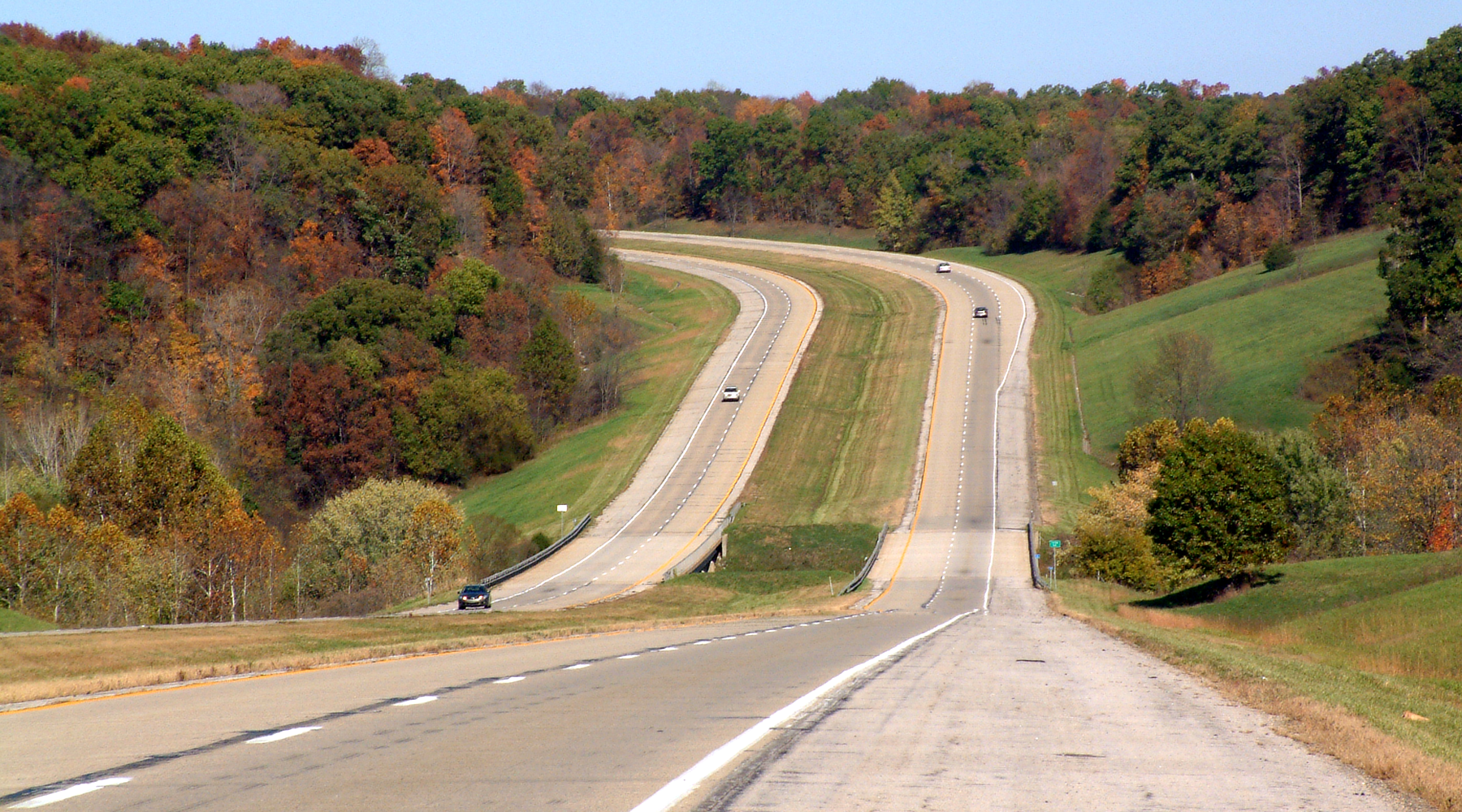
Looking north along State Road 63 north of U.S. Route 136

The southern terminus of the northern section is at an interchange with US 41, just north of the traffic light at Maple Avenue in Terre Haute. The highway heads northwest as a four-lane expressway, paralleling the west bank of the Wabash River. The expressway passes through rural farmland and woodland, with a few houses. The route curves north-northeast near a traffic light at SR 163, then bypasses Clinton and curves back north. North of Clinton the expressway passes by the Clinton Airport and a folded-diamond interchange at US 36. The route turns northwest bypassing Newport, followed by an intersection with the north terminus SR 71. After SR 71, the road heads north and has an intersection at SR 234, just east of Cayuga. The highway has an interchange with Interstate 74 and a diamond interchange with US 136, just west of Covington. North of the interchange at US 136, the road has an intersection with SR 263, also known as old SR 63. The expressway has an intersection at SR 28, northwest of West Lebanon. The road has another intersection with SR 263 and then ends at an interchange with US 41. At its northern terminus, it rejoins US 41 in northern Warren County, near the small town of Carbondale. At this point, US 41 once again becomes a four-lane divided highway, taking over from SR 63.

== History ==
Before 1973, the state road from US 41 in Terre Haute to US 41 north of West Lebanon was two-lanes. In 1973, the State of Indiana began to build a four-lane divided highway in this area, the rest of the road stayed two-lanes. The expressway was completed in 1978, and some of the old route was designated as SR 263, to serve the towns bypassed. The road was one section until 2008 when the State of Indiana decommissioned the section from SR 246 south of Terre Haute to US 41 at the north end of Terre Haute.

== Major intersections ==
County	Location	mi	km	Destinations	Notes
Sullivan	Merom	0.000	0.000	SR 58 east – Carlisle	Southern terminus of SR 63; Western terminus of SR 58
Sullivan	Turman Township	4.336	6.978	SR 154 – Sullivan	
Sullivan	Fairbanks Township	10.664	17.162	SR 48 east – Shelburn	
Vigo	Prairie Creek Township	16.318	26.261	SR 246 east – Clay City	Northern end of state maintenance
Vigo	Terre Haute			US 150 east (Ohio Street)	
Vigo	Terre Haute			US 150 east (Cherry Street)	
Vigo	Terre Haute	16.319	26.263	US 41 – Rockville, Evansville Maple Avenue	Southern end of state maintenance
Vermillion	Clinton	28.236	45.441	SR 163	
Vermillion	Montezuma	38.263– 38.616	61.578– 62.146	US 36 – Rockville, Decatur IL.	
Vermillion	Vermillion Township	46.471	74.788	SR 71 south	
Vermillion	Cayuga	50.013	80.488	SR 234	
Vermillion	Highland Township	56.977	91.696	SR 32	
Vermillion	Highland Township	61.533– 61.691	99.028– 99.282	I-74 – Indianapolis, Peoria IL.	Exit number 4 on I-74
Warren	Mound Township	62.740– 62.143	100.970– 100.009	US 136 – Covington, Danville IL.	
Warren	Mound Township	63.647	102.430	SR 263 north	Southern terminus of SR 263
Warren	Pike Township	73.209	117.818	SR 28 – West Lebanon	
Warren	Liberty Township	76.101	122.473	SR 263 south	Northern terminus of SR 263
Warren	Liberty Township	79.555	128.031	US 41 north – Chicago	Northern terminus of SR 63; northbound SR 63 can only access northbound US 41, and US 41 northbound cannot access SR 63. US 41 southbound can access southbound SR 63.
1.000 mi = 1.609 km; 1.000 km = 0.621 mi
