= U.S. Route 41 in Indiana =

Section of U.S. Highway in Indiana, United States

U.S. Route 41
- US 41 highlighted in red

Route information
- Maintained by INDOT
- Length: 279.817 mi (450.322 km)
- Existed: October 1, 1926–present

Major junctions
- South end: US 41 at the Kentucky state line in Evansville
- I-69 in Evansville; I-64 near Inglefield; US 50 / US 150 in Vincennes; I-70 / US 40 in Terre Haute; I-74 near Veedersburg; I-80 / I-94 / US 6 in Hammond; I-90 / Indiana Toll Road in Hammond
- North end: US 12 / US 20 / US 41 at the Illinois state line in Whiting

Location
- Country: United States
- State: Indiana
- Counties: Vanderburgh, Gibson, Knox, Sullivan, Vigo, Parke, Fountain, Warren, Benton, Newton, Lake

Highway system
- United States Numbered Highway System; List; Special; Divided; Indiana State Highway System; Interstate; US; State; Scenic
← US 40	→ SR 42

U.S. Route 41 (US 41) in the state of Indiana is a north–south US Highway that is parallel to the Illinois state line. It enters the state south of Evansville as a four-lane divided highway passing around Vincennes and traveling north to Terre Haute. In Terre Haute, it is known as 3rd Street. North of Terre Haute, it hooks east and becomes a two-lane surface road. Those wanting to stay on a four-lane divided highway can use State Road 63 to the west. It passes through Rockville, Veedersburg, and Attica before returning to a four-lane divided highway when SR 63 terminates in Warren County. It remains a four-lane divided highway until Lake County, where it becomes a main road known as Indianapolis Boulevard. It overlaps US 12 and US 20 in Hammond and exits Indiana into the South Side of Chicago.

== Route description ==
US Route 41 is a largely rural road in western Indiana. It begins by crossing the Ohio River using the Bi-State Vietnam Gold Star Bridges, commonly known as "The Twin Bridges", from Henderson, Kentucky, into Evansville. Through Evansville, US 41 is again a standard arterial roadway with traffic lights and urban congestion. North of Evansville, the road becomes a rural four-lane non-Interstate-standard highway. The highway reaches Interstate 64, then has three interchanges as it passes Princeton, including one dedicated to traffic coming into and out of Toyota Motor Manufacturing Indiana, ending with SR 64 on Princeton's west side addition as it heads north towards Vincennes.

South of Vincennes, US 41 turns into an Interstate-standard freeway and bypasses the east side of Vincennes with interchanges and grade separations. In the middle of this bypass there is a three-level stack interchange with US 50 and US 150 eastbound, headed for Washington, Indiana; Cincinnati, Ohio; and Louisville, Kentucky. US 50 splits to the west in the city, heading for Lawrenceville, Illinois, and St. Louis, Missouri, while US 41 and US 150 continue north.

North of Vincennes, the expressway turns into a four-lane divided highway, a relatively older pre–Interstate-era highway coated with asphalt and a narrow median. US 41 and US 150 pass through Sullivan before entering Terre Haute. US 150 leaves the concurrency in the south end of the city, headed west towards Danville and Moline, Illinois, while US 41 continues north through Terre Haute. Through town, US 41 is an urban arterial road with traffic lights. It approaches an interchange with Interstate 70, then passes by Honey Creek Mall and Indiana State University.

North of Terre Haute, SR 63 splits to the northwest as a four-lane highway towards Clinton. US 41 heads northeast as a rural two-lane US Highway, passing through the communities of Rockville and Bloomingdale. The road reaches Interstate 74 at Veedersburg, where it briefly divides into a four-lane highway. US 41 again reduces to a two-lane highway and continues north, going past Rob Roy and Attica. Past Attica, US 41 turns northwest and rejoins the four-lane highway near Kramer at the northern terminus of SR 63.

US 41 continues northbound as a divided highway with a few crossovers at SR 26, SR 352 at Boswell, and SR 18. Past SR 63, US 41 has an interchange with US 52 eastbound, which heads southeast towards Lafayette and Indianapolis as a four-lane divided rural highway. US 52 westbound joins with US 41 heading north towards Kentland In 2008, a wind farm was built next to the highway near Earl Park.

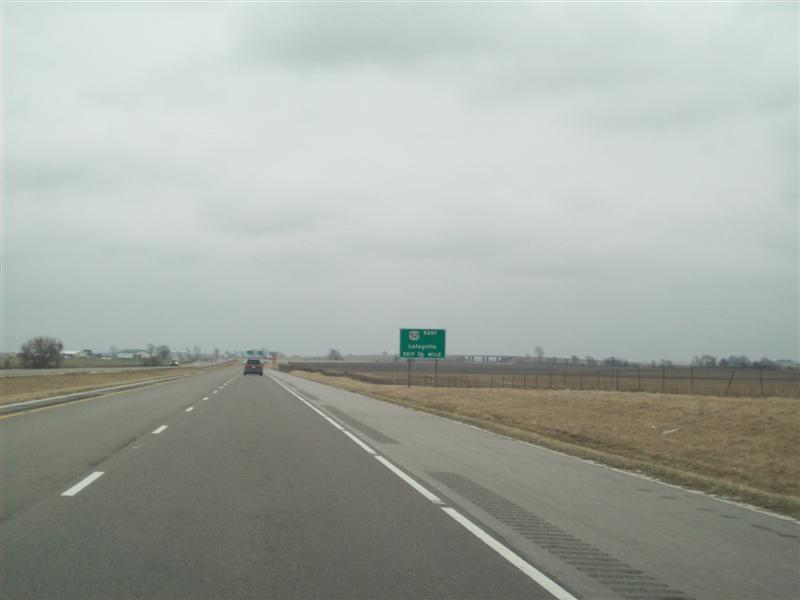
US 41/52 interchange

In Kentland, the road junctions with US 24. US 52 westbound leaves the concurrency here with US 24, heading for Watseka, Kankakee, and Peoria, all in Illinois, while US 24 east heads to Logansport and Huntington. US 41 becomes a four-lane divided US highway past this junction. It is relatively an older divided highway with a narrow median. This highway used to be a two-lane route. One side of the highway is rolling and wavy, while the other half of the highway is built flat and to more modern standards. This portion of the route is mainly asphalt. According to the Indiana Department of Transportation (INDOT), the twinning of US 41 in Indiana was begun in 1951, with construction progressing from south to north.

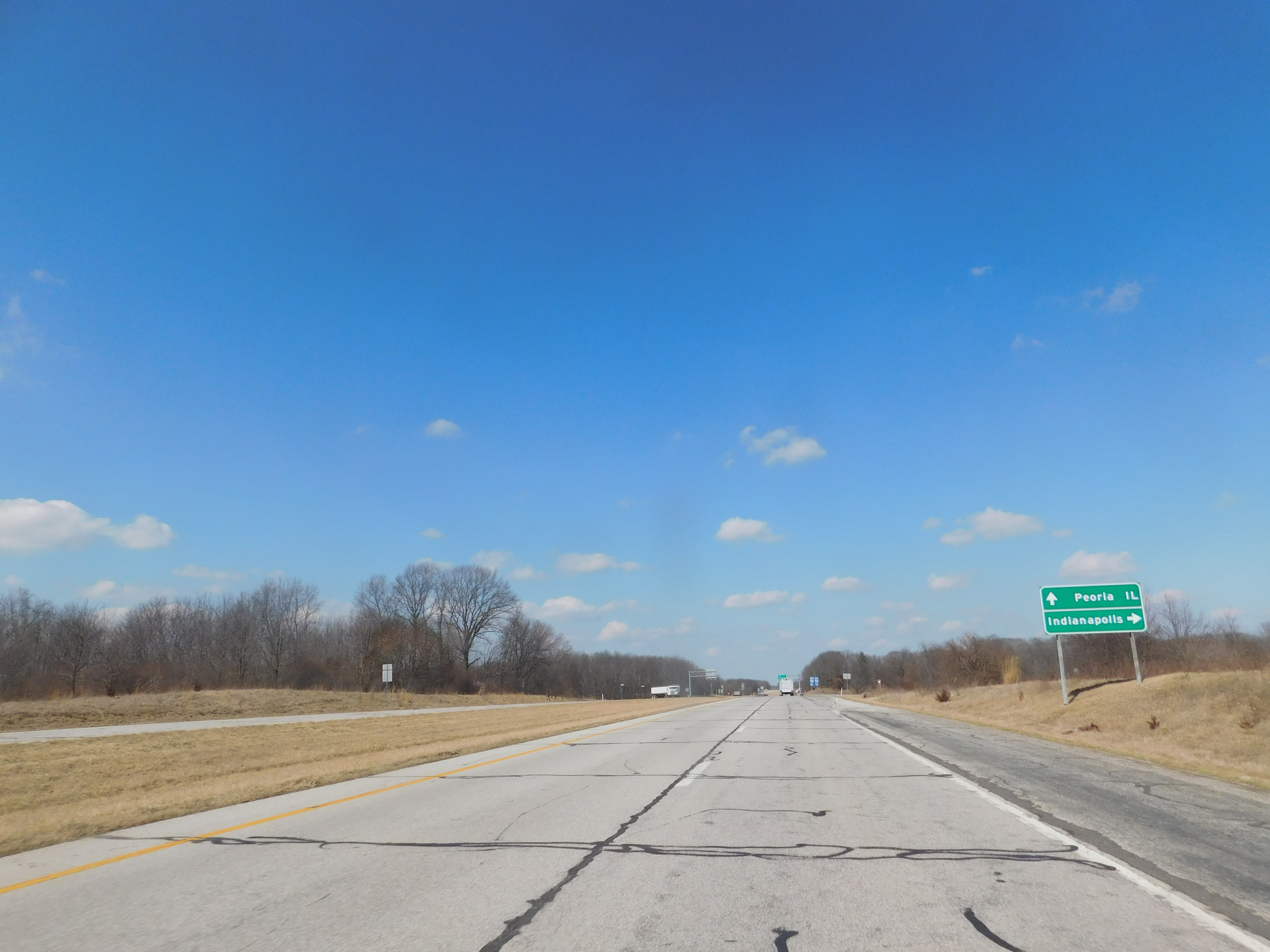
US 41 north at I-74 in Veedersburg

Up until the mid-1990s, many older styled bridges existed on the route, including a 1930s-era truss bridge across the Kankakee River in Schneider and some pre-Interstate-era concrete bridges at the railroad overpass near Morocco and the Iroquois River bridge. All of these bridges have since been updated to INDOT's latest standards using concrete latex overlays and new concrete bridge decks.

Traffic volumes on this section of highway are relatively low and many intersections contain 1940s- and 1950s-era former gas stations, diners, and businesses associated with the highway before I-65 was built in the early 1960s. Many of these businesses have been converted to new uses, such as used car dealerships and offices, while some have been abandoned. US 41 is sometimes considered an alternate to Interstate 65 due to its low traffic volumes.

From Kentland, US 41 passes through the towns and villages of Ade, Enos, Lake Village, and Schneider, before entering Cedar Lake. Once in Cedar Lake, US 41 becomes an undivided four-lane arterial road. The road passes through the bedroom communities of St. John, Schererville, and Highland. Entering the urban core of Northwest Indiana, the route goes through Hammond, briefly overlapping I-80/I-94/US 6. In Whiting, the highway joins US 12/US 20 before exiting Indiana and entering Illinois in Chicago.

In total, US 41 covers nearly 280 miles (450 km) from Evansville on the south end to Whiting in the north.

== History ==
The alignment was designated as SR 10, until it was rerouted as US 41 on October 1, 1926.

== Major junctions ==
County	Location	mi	km	Destinations	Notes
Vanderburgh	Evansville	0.000	0.000	US 41 south – Henderson	Continuation into Kentucky
Vanderburgh	Evansville	0.462– 1.667	0.744– 2.683	I-69 north – Indianapolis	Exit 0 on I-69
Vanderburgh	Evansville	3.738	6.016	SR 62 west / SR 66 east / Lloyd Expressway	Southern end of SR 62/SR 66 concurrency; interchange
Vanderburgh	Evansville	4.820	7.757	SR 62 east / Morgan Avenue – Boonville	Northern end of SR 62 concurrency
Vanderburgh	Evansville	5.326	8.571	SR 66 west / Diamond Avenue	Northern end of SR 66 concurrency; interchange
Vanderburgh	Evansville	8.904	14.330	SR 57 north – Regional Airport, Washington	Southern terminus of SR 57
Vanderburgh–Gibson county line	Scott–Johnson township line	16.728– 17.220	26.921– 27.713	I-64 – Louisville, St. Louis	Exit 25 on I-64
Gibson	Haubstadt	19.062	30.677	SR 68 – Haubstadt, Dale	
Gibson	Fort Branch	23.253	37.422	SR 168 – Owensville, Mackey	
Gibson	Union Township	24.765	39.855	CR 550 South – Toyota	Interchange
Gibson	Patoka Township	27.422	44.131	Princeton	Interchange; access via CR 300
Gibson	Princeton	30.989	49.872	SR 64 – Princeton, Mt. Carmel	Interchange
Gibson	Hazleton	39.824	64.091	SR 56 east – Hazleton, Petersburg	Western terminus of SR 56
Knox	Decker	43.622	70.203	SR 241 north – Decker	Southern terminus of SR 241
Knox	Vincennes	52.292	84.156	SR 441 north	Southern end of freeway bypass of Vincennes
Knox	Vincennes	53.655	86.349	Hart Street	Interchange
Knox	Vincennes	55.309	89.011	US 50 east / US 150 east – Washington	Southern end of US 50/US 150 concurrency
Knox	Vincennes	56.491	90.913	US 50 west to SR 61 (Sixth Street) – Lawrenceville	Northern end of US 50 concurrency; interchange; northern end of Vincennes freeway bypass overlap
Knox	Vincennes	57.968	93.290	SR 67 north – Bicknell	Southern terminus of SR 67
Knox	Emison	64.497	103.798	SR 550 east – Bruceville, Wheatland	Western terminus of SR 550
Sullivan	Carlisle	76.320	122.825	SR 58 – Merom, Carlisle	
Sullivan	Sullivan	84.066	135.291	SR 54 east – Dugger, Linton	Western terminus of SR 54
Sullivan	Sullivan	86.224	138.764	SR 154 west / West Wolfe Street – Graysville, Sullivan	Western terminus of SR 154
Sullivan	Shelburn	92.349	148.621	SR 48 – Hymera, Jasonville	
Vigo	Pimento	98.537	158.580	SR 246	
Vigo	Terre Haute	105.120	169.174	SR 641 (McDaniel Road)	SR 641 only partially complete to I-70
Vigo	Terre Haute	109.696– 109.836	176.539– 176.764	I-70 / US 40 – Terre Haute, Indianapolis, St. Louis	Exit 7 on I-70
Vigo	Terre Haute	112.165	180.512	US 150 west (Cherry Street)	Northern end of US 150 concurrency
Vigo	Terre Haute	114.052	183.549	SR 63 north – Clinton, Chicago	Southern terminus of SR 63; Y-interchange with indirect access to northbound US 41 via Maple Avenue
Parke	Florida Township	126.568– 126.630	203.691– 203.791	SR 163 west – Clinton	Eastern terminus of SR 163
Parke	Rockville	137.792	221.755	US 36 (West Ohio Street) – Danville, Montezuma, Raccoon Lake State Recreation Area	
Parke	Penn–Washington township line	143.703	231.268	SR 236 east – Marshall	Western terminus of SR 236
Parke	Penn Township	145.768	234.591	SR 47 north – Turkey Run State Park, Crawfordsville	Southern terminus of SR 47
Fountain	Millcreek Township	152.354	245.190	SR 234 – Cayuga, Jamestown	
Fountain	Millcreek Township	157.563	253.573	SR 32 – Perrysville, Crawfordsville	
Fountain	Veedersburg	161.790	260.376	US 136 east – Crawfordsville	Southern end of US 136 concurrency
Fountain	Veedersburg	162.428	261.403	US 136 west – Danville	Northern end of US 136 concurrency
Fountain	Veedersburg	163.093– 163.240	262.473– 262.709	I-74 – Indianapolis, Peoria	Exit 15 on I-74
Fountain	Shawnee Township	170.902	275.040	SR 55 south – Newtown	Southern end of SR 55 concurrency
Fountain	Attica	174.793	281.302	SR 28 east	Southeastern end of SR 28 concurrency
Warren	Washington–Liberty– Warren township tripoint	176.095	283.397	SR 55 north	Northern end of SR 55 concurrency
Warren	Liberty Township	177.531	285.708	SR 28 west – Williamsport	Northwestern end of SR 28 concurrency
Warren	Carbondale	182.711	294.045	SR 63 south – Terre Haute, Evansville	Northern terminus of SR 63; no direct access to SR 63 south from US 41 north (access via W CR 200 North)
Warren	Pine Township	189.737	305.352	SR 26 east	Southern end of SR 26 concurrency
Warren	Prairie Township	190.291	306.244	SR 26 west – Hoopeston	Northern end of SR 26 concurrency
Benton	Boswell	194.366	312.802	SR 352	
Benton	Parish Grove–Center township line	201.334	324.016	SR 18 – Fowler	
Benton	Richland Township	203.795– 204.452	327.976– 329.034	US 52 east – Lafayette	Southern end of the US 52 concurrency
Newton	Kentland	212.737	342.367	US 24 / US 52 west – Watseka, Remington	Northern end of the US 52 concurrency
Newton	Ade	219.548	353.328	SR 16 east	Western terminus of SR 16
Newton	Morocco	224.696	361.613	SR 114 east	Western terminus of SR 114; intersection is a J-turn
Newton	Enos	230.006	370.159	SR 14 east to I-65	Western terminus of SR 14
Newton	Lake Village	239.142	384.862	SR 10	
Lake	West Creek Township	246.766	397.131	SR 2 west	Southern end of SR 2 concurrency
Lake	West Creek Township	249.388	401.351	SR 2 east – Lowell	Northern end of SR 2 concurrency
Lake	St. John	258.436	415.912	US 231 south – Crown Point, Lake County Fairgrounds	Northern terminus of US 231
Lake	Schererville	263.323	423.777	US 30	
Lake	Hammond	269.142	433.142	I-80 east / I-94 east / US 6 east (Borman Expressway) / SR 152 north (Indianapolis Boulevard)	Eastern end of I-80/I-94/US 6 concurrency; exit 2 on I-80/I-94; southern terminus of SR 152
Lake	Hammond	270.640	435.553	I-80 west / I-94 west / US 6 west (Borman Expressway) to I-294 – Chicago	Western end of I-80/I-94/US 6 concurrency; exit 1 on I-80/I-94
Lake	Hammond	275.017– 275.423	442.597– 443.250	I-90 Toll / Indiana Toll Road	Exit 5 on I-90 / Toll Road
Lake	Hammond	276.365	444.766	SR 912 (Cline Avenue) – Chicago	
Lake	Hammond	278.504	448.209	US 12 east / US 20 east / LMCT (Indianapolis Boulevard south)	Southern end of US 12/US 20 concurrency
Lake	Hammond	279.453– 279.760	449.736– 450.230	I-90 Toll east / Indiana Toll Road east to I-80 / I-94	Exit 0 on I-90 / Toll Road
Lake	Hammond	279.817	450.322	US 12 west / US 20 west / US 41 north / LMCT (Indianapolis Boulevard) – Chicago	Continuation into Illinois
1.000 mi = 1.609 km; 1.000 km = 0.621 mi: Concurrency terminus; Incomplete access; Tolled

== See also ==
- U.S. Route 31 in Indiana
- Indiana State Road 241
- Indiana State Road 441
- Indiana State Road 641

U.S. Route 41
Previous state: Kentucky	Indiana	Next state: Illinois
