= Warren County Courthouse (Indiana) =

- U.S. National Register of Historic Places
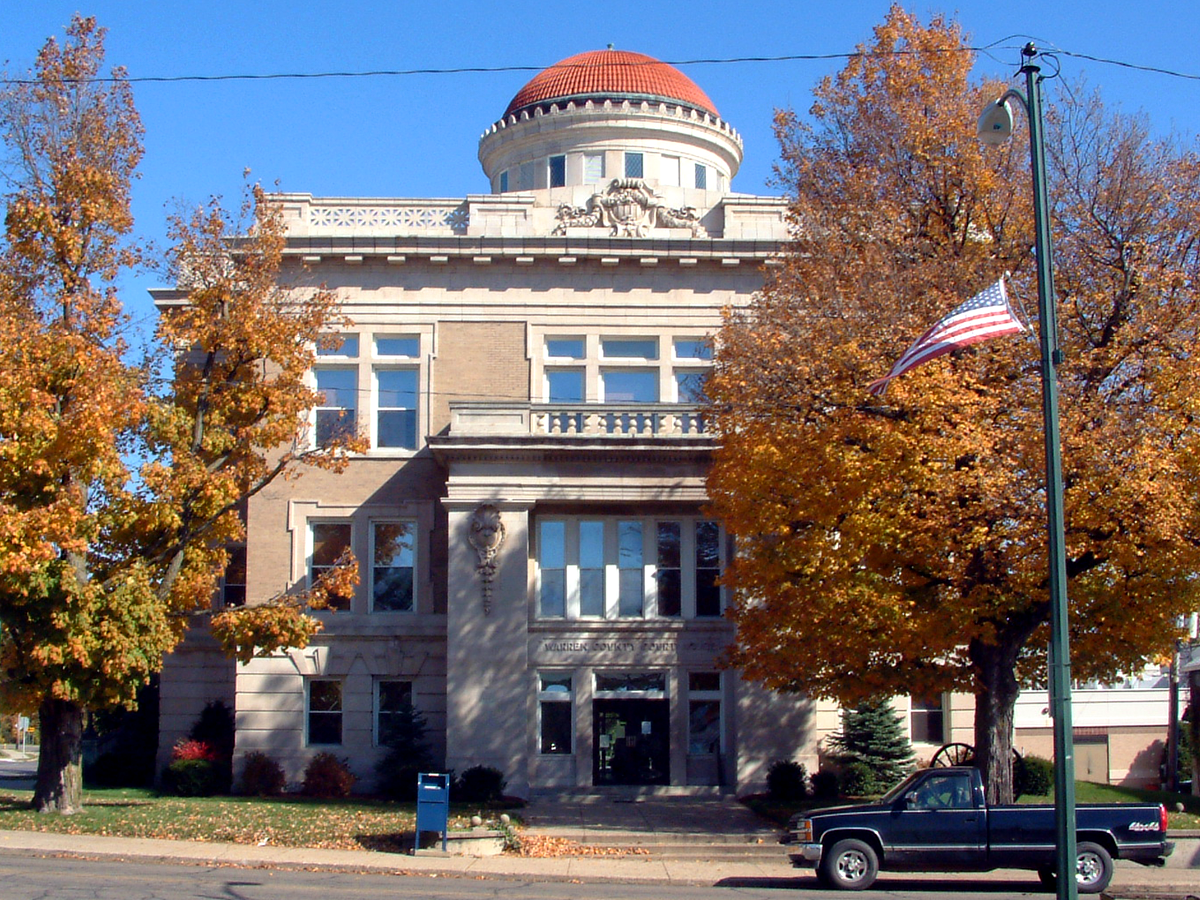

- Location within Warren County, Indiana Location within Indiana Location within the United States
- Location: 125 North Monroe Street, Williamsport, Indiana
- Coordinates: 40°17′17″N 87°17′39″W
- Area: less than one acre
- Built: 1908
- Architect: J. W. Royer
- NRHP reference No.: 08000195
- Added to NRHP: March 19, 2008

The Warren County Courthouse is a stone building constructed in 1908 in Williamsport, Indiana. It was added to the National Register of Historic Places on March 19, 2008.

== History ==
At the first Warren County seat of Warrenton, a log house owned (and occupied) by Enoch Farmer was used for general court and county purposes. When the county seat was moved to Williamsport, a log house belonging to the town's proprietor, William Harrison, served as the courthouse starting in July 1829. In 1832, plans were made for a new building, and in July of that year the construction bid was won by E. W. Jones and Seth Flowers. The new building was to be made of brick, 40 feet (12 m) square and 23 feet (7.0 m) high, and was to be completed by August 1833; but various problems delayed this until mid-1834. The cost of construction was about $2000. (Note: A $2,000 capital expense in 1835 would be roughly equivalent to $1,030,000 in 2009.) In 1835 the building was strengthened and improved.

In 1870 a specially-appointed committee determined that the old building was unsafe, and plans were begun to replace it; but opposition to the plan delayed progress until early 1871. The plans called for a new brick building to be constructed in what is now known as "Old Town", the original portion of Williamsport that was on the shores of the Wabash River. The firm of Hays and Evans of Bloomington, Illinois was awarded the job with a bid of $48,400. (Note: A $48,000 capital expense in 1872 would be roughly equivalent to $11,300,000 in 2009.) The county did not have sufficient funds for the project, so $10,000 worth of county bonds were issued. The new courthouse was accepted in December 1872.

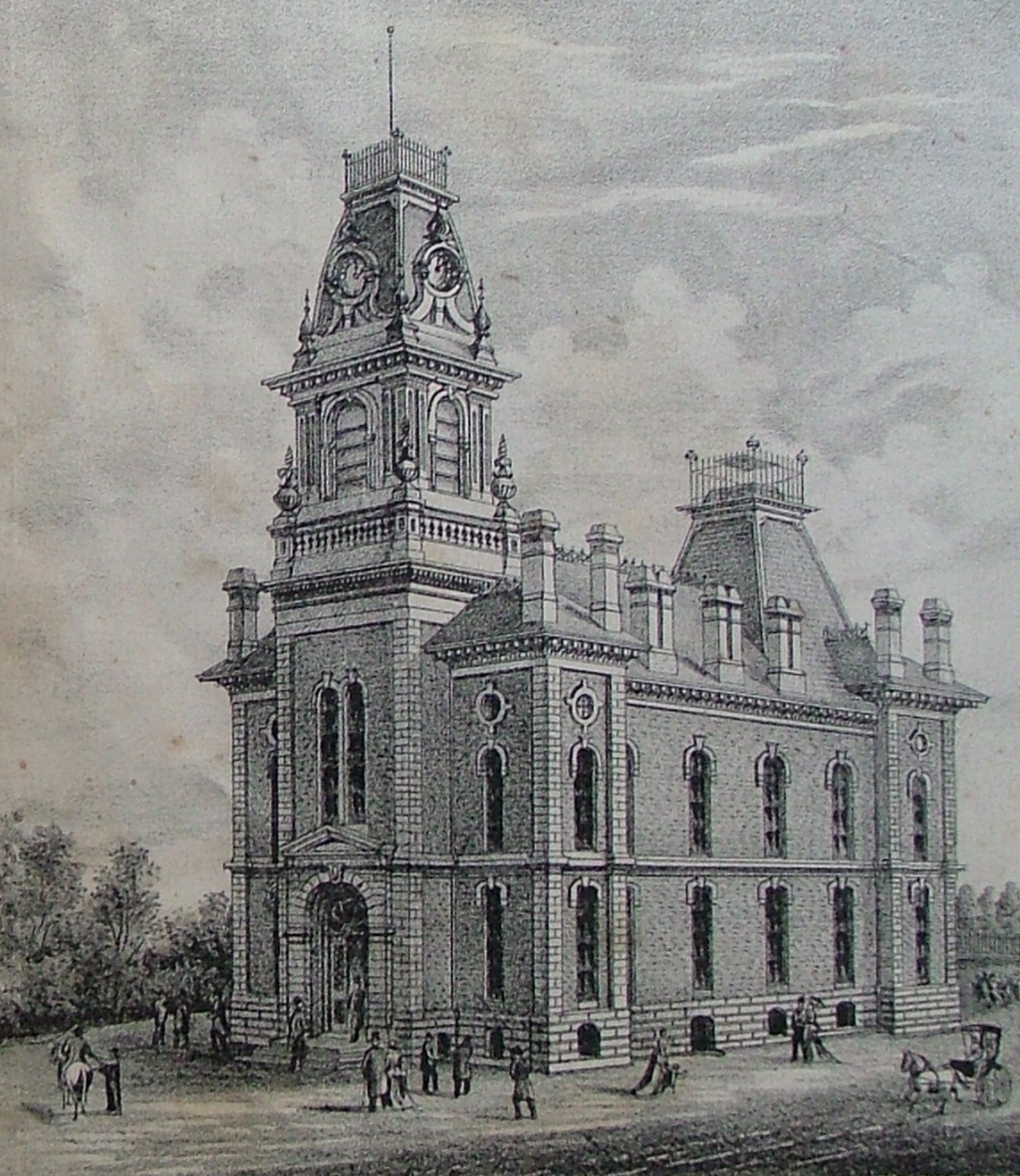
Warren County Courthouse in 1877

In 1886 it was torn down and rebuilt as the third courthouse on the current site, in the newer portion of town that had developed because of the railroad. This courthouse had a 155-foot tower. Early on the morning of Sunday, January 20, 1907, the building caught fire and was largely destroyed, though most of the records were saved.

The current courthouse was designed by J. W. Royer of Urbana, Illinois and was constructed by Frank Jahn of Champaign, Illinois and L. N. Cope of Decatur, Illinois at a cost of $115,000. (Note: A $115,000 capital expense in 1908 would be roughly equivalent to $15,500,000 in 2009.) Following the fire of January 1907, construction of the new building was under way by October, during the term of Governor Frank Hanly. It was built primarily of stone, with stairs made of iron and marble. The county purchased two large brass cannons from the United States Government and placed them outside the building, where they still remain.
