= Kramer, Indiana =

- Unincorporated community and Census-designated place
- Location within Warren County, Indiana Location within Indiana Location within the United States
- Coordinates: 40°20′20″N 87°17′06″W
- Country: United States
- State: Indiana
- County: Warren
- Township: Liberty
- Founded: 1885
- Named for: Harry L. Kramer

Area
  - Total: 0.35 sq mi (0.90 km^{2})
  - Land: 0.35 sq mi (0.90 km^{2})
- Elevation: 663 ft (202 m)

Population (2020)
  - Total: 86
  - Density: 246.6/sq mi (95.21/km^{2})
- Time zone: UTC-5 (Eastern (EST))
  - Summer (DST): UTC-4 (EDT)
- ZIP code: 47993
- Area code: 765
- GNIS feature ID: 2806511

Kramer is a small unincorporated community in Liberty Township, Warren County, in the U.S. state of Indiana. As of the 2020 census, Kramer had a population of 86.

== History ==
On November 5, 1885, a post office was established called Cameron Springs, named for its first postmaster William Cameron. On June 12, 1889, the name was changed to Indiana Mineral Springs, and on March 23, 1901, it was changed again to Kramer, for the Henry L. Kramer who built the nearby resort Hotel Mudlavia. Mudlavia offered treatments that took advantage of the local mineral springs, which were believed to have therapeutic properties.

Indianapolis-based bottled water company Cameron Springs drew on the water's reputation to help market its product. Perrier Group of America acquired Cameron Springs for approximately $10.5 million in June 2000.

== Geography ==
Kramer is located about 3.5 miles (5.6 km) north of the county seat of Williamsport, and is surrounded by wooded hills and gullies that lead down to Big Pine Creek less than half a mile to the west.

== Demographics ==
Historical population
Census	Pop.	Note	%±
2020	86		—
U.S. Decennial Census

== Education ==
It is in the Metropolitan School District of Warren County.
