= Hotel Mudlavia =

Hotel and spa in Indiana, US

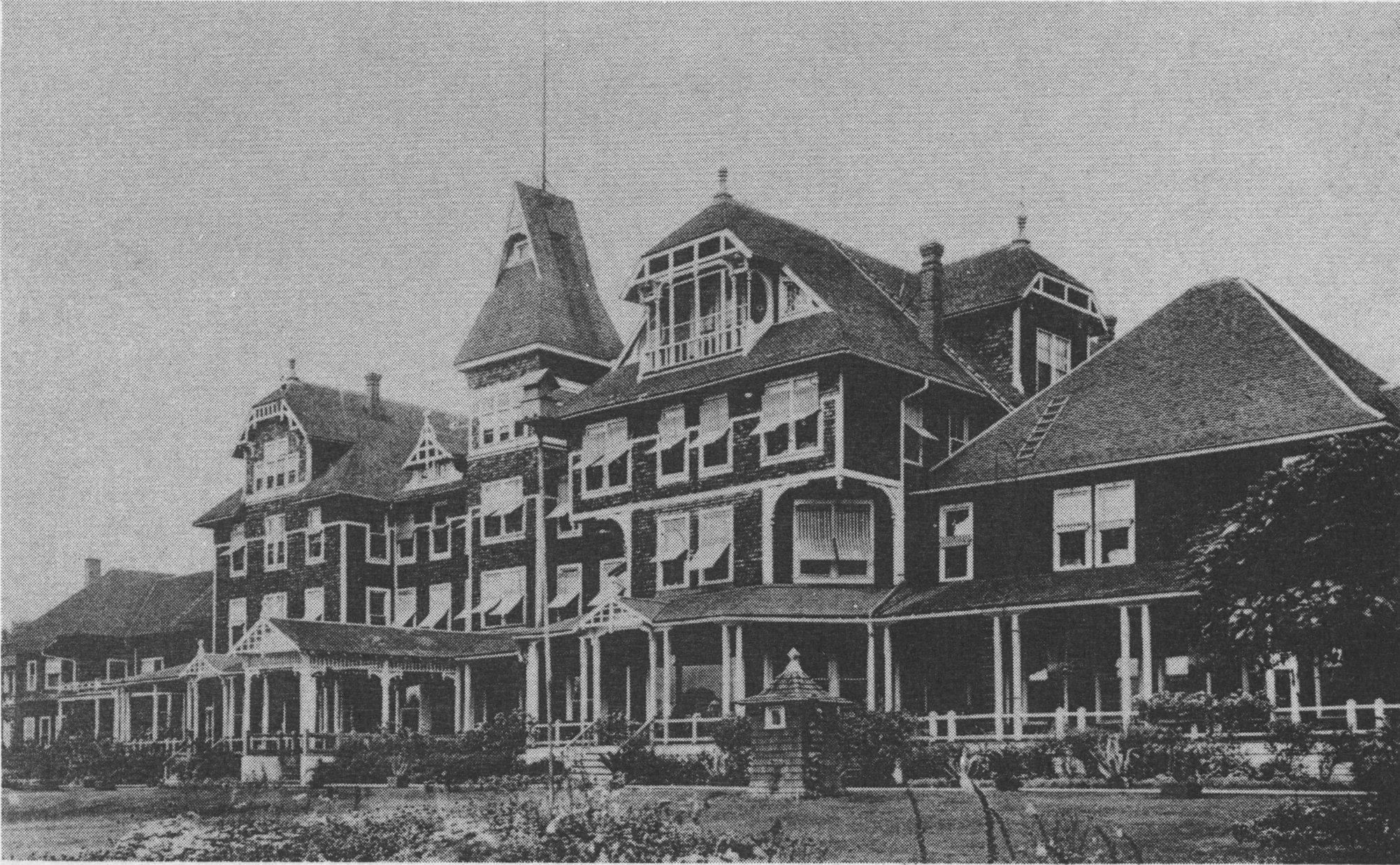
The original Mudlavia Hotel

Hotel Mudlavia (commonly referred to simply as Mudlavia, and originally named the Indiana Springs Company) was a hotel and spa built on the site of a natural spring near the town of Kramer in Warren County, Indiana, US. The spring was discovered by Samuel Story, a Civil War soldier who, in August 1884, was reputed to have been working in the mud digging a drainage ditch. He drank water from the spring and discovered that his rheumatism symptoms gradually disappeared.

Harry L. Kramer developed the concept and opened the hotel on December 25, 1890, at a cost of $250,000. (Note: A $250,000 capital expense in 1890 would be roughly equivalent to $47,000,000 in 2009.) It served guests for many years and drew visitors from around the world including such famous people as John L. Sullivan, James Bingham, James Whitcomb Riley, Harry Lauder, Captain Jack Crawford and Paul Dresser. The building was destroyed by fire on February 29, 1920.

A smaller building was constructed and was operated as a rest home for the elderly and later a restaurant called "Pleasant Valley Lodge". That burned in 1968. After Pleasant Valley Lodge closed, another owner returned the building to its original name of Mudlavia Lodge and operated until it burned in 1974.

Water from the springs was bottled and distributed commercially by the Indianapolis-based Cameron Springs company, which was acquired by the Perrier Group of America in 2000 for about $10.5 million. As of 2008, the water was still being sold and was marketed by a variety of companies under different names.
