= Pine Village, Indiana =

- Town
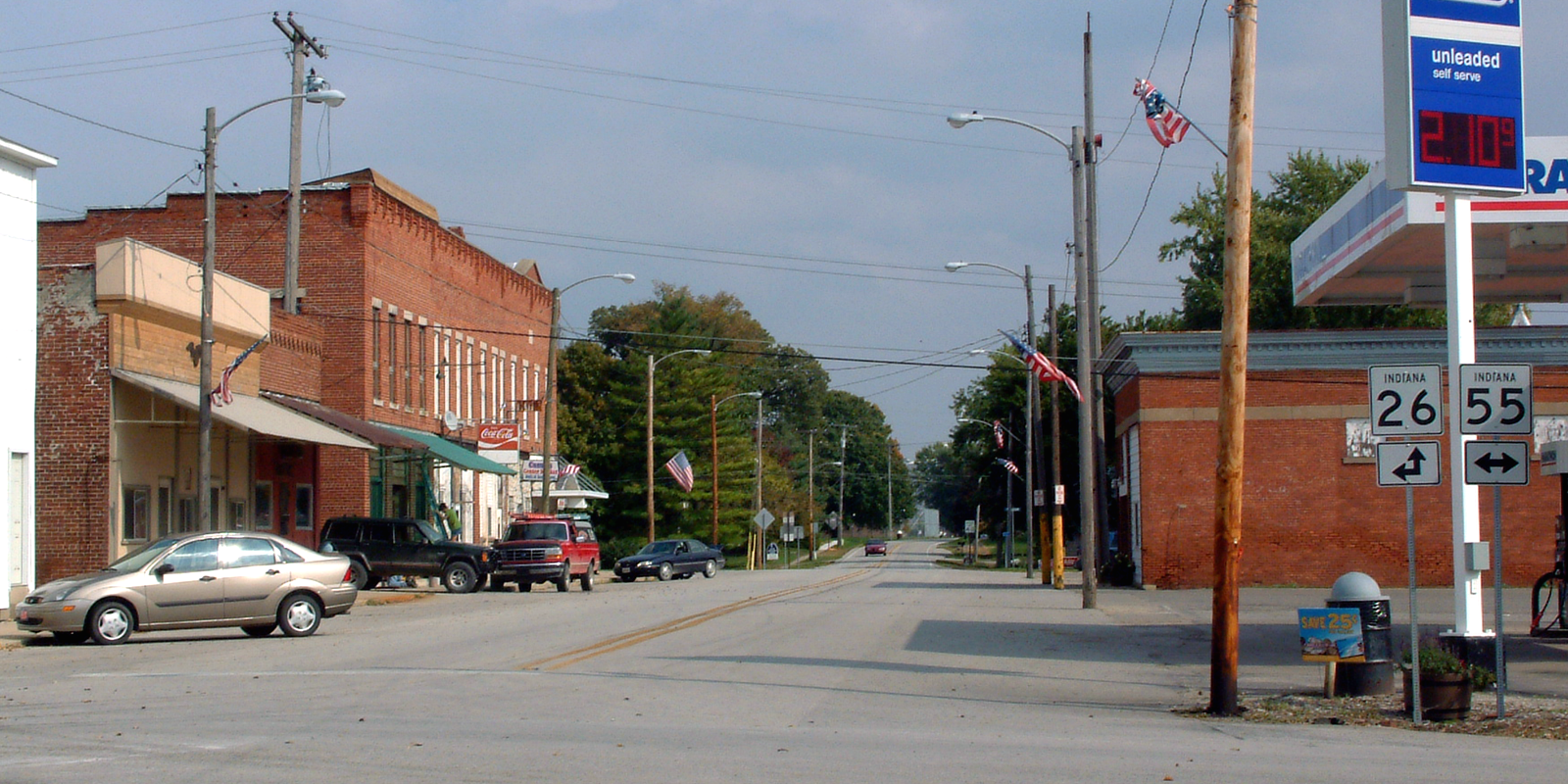
- Lafayette Street at the intersection of 26 and 55

- Logo

- Location within Warren County, Indiana Location within Indiana Location within the United States
- Coordinates: 40°26′58″N 87°15′12″W
- Country: United States
- State: Indiana
- County: Warren
- Township: Adams
- Founded: 1851
- Founded by: Isaac and John Metsker
- Named after: Big Pine Creek

Area
  - Total: 0.12 sq mi (0.31 km^{2})
  - Land: 0.12 sq mi (0.31 km^{2})
  - Water: 0 sq mi (0.00 km^{2})
- Elevation: 689 ft (210 m)

Population (2020)
  - Total: 212
  - Density: 1,761.4/sq mi (680.07/km^{2})
- Time zone: UTC-5 (Eastern (EST))
  - Summer (DST): UTC-4 (EDT)
- ZIP code: 47975
- Area code: 765
- FIPS code: 18-60084
- GNIS feature ID: 2396857
- Website: pinevillage.in.gov

Pine Village is a town in Adams Township, Warren County, in the U.S. state of Indiana. The population was 212 at the 2020 census.

== History ==
The town was founded at the location of a trading post called Pine Village, which may have been named for a lone pine tree that stood on the bluff of Pine Creek, or it may have been named for the creek itself. The town was laid out in 1851 by Isaac and John R. Metsker, and the plat map was made by county surveyor Perrin Kent. The Methodist Church was already there; it was built several years earlier.

The post office at Pine Village has been in operation since 1854.

=== Rail service ===
Rail service reached the town in the 1870s. The year 1883 witnessed the completion of a north–south Chicago and Great Southern Railway (later the Chicago and Indiana Coal Railway) line between Attica and Fair Oaks, some 50 miles (80 km) to the north. The line was later part of the Chicago and Eastern Illinois Railroad. It came to be known as the "Coal Road" for the large quantities of coal transported along it. When the C&EI floundered in the early 1920s, Charles F. Propst purchased the Coal Road and in October 1922 incorporated it as the Chicago, Attica and Southern Railroad. The CA&S was placed in receivership on August 5, 1931, and incremental abandonment occurred over subsequent years. The line through Pine Village was scrapped in the fall of 1945, and the rails were pulled up using a Belgian horse and a block and tackle.

=== Professional football ===
During the mid-1910s, Pine Village hosted a prominent professional football team.

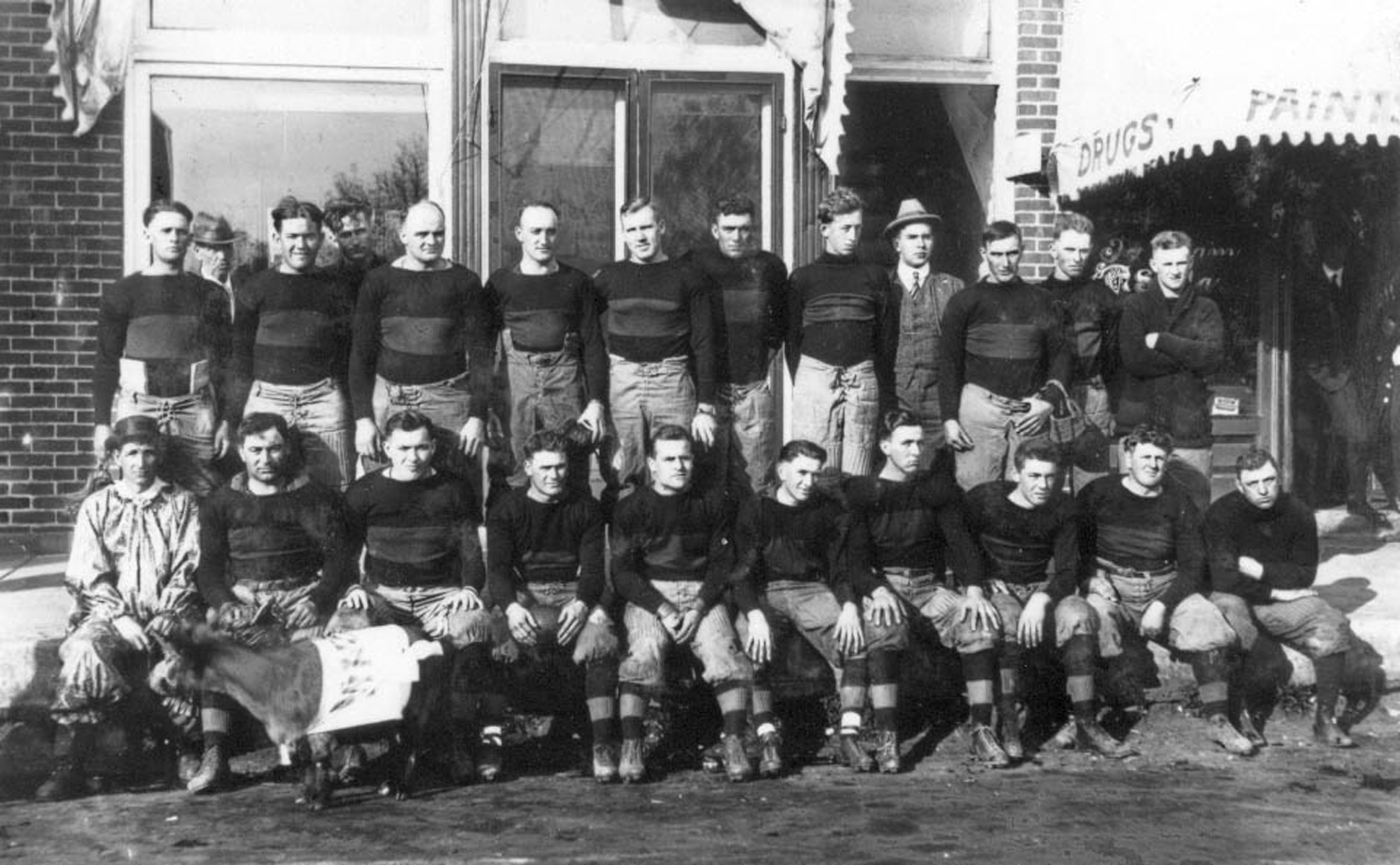
The football team of 1915

== Geography ==
Map of Pine Village

Pine Village is located at the intersection of State Road 55 and State Road 26, near Big Pine Creek. It is about 20 miles (32 km) west of Lafayette and about 14 miles (23 km) east of the Illinois border. According to the 2010 census, Pine Village has a total area of 0.12 square miles (0.31 km^{2}), all land.

The area on the east side of Pine Village near the railroad, consisting of a grain elevator and some homes, was known as Oklahoma and is located at 40°26′59″N 87°14′42″W.

== Demographics ==
Historical population
Census	Pop.	Note	%±
1900	279		—
1910	352		26.2%
1920	301		−14.5%
1930	323		7.3%
1940	303		−6.2%
1950	311		2.6%
1960	309		−0.6%
1970	291		−5.8%
1980	257		−11.7%
1990	134		−47.9%
2000	255		90.3%
2010	217		−14.9%
2020	212		−2.3%
U.S. Decennial Census

As of the 2010 United States census, there were 143 people, 60 households, and 41 families residing here. The population density was 1,027.6 inhabitants per square mile (396.8/km^{2}). There were 70 housing units at an average density of 503.0 per square mile (194.2/km^{2}). The racial makeup was 98.6% white, 0.7% black or African American, 0.0% from other races, and 0.7% from two or more races. Those of Hispanic or Latino origin made up 0.7% of the population. In terms of ancestry, 32.8% were German, 13.9% were Swedish, 11.5% were Irish, 9.8% were American, and 9.8% were English.

Of the 60 households, 26.7% had children under the age of 18 living with them, 55.0% were married couples living together, 8.3% had a female householder with no husband present, 31.7% were non-families, and 28.3% of all households were made up of individuals. The average household size was 2.38 and the average family size was 2.85. The median age was 46.1 years.

The median income for a household was $48,750 and the median income for a family was $62,083. Males had a median income of $58,750 versus $36,250 for females. The per capita income for was $26,957. About 17.4% of families and 17.2% of the population were below the poverty line, including 0.0% of those under age 18 and 0.0% of those age 65 or over.

== Education ==
It is in the Metropolitan School District of Warren County.
