= U.S. Route 136 in Indiana =

Segment of American highway

U.S. Route 136
- US 136 highlighted in red

Route information
- Maintained by INDOT
- Length: 74.930 mi (120.588 km)

Major junctions
- West end: US 136 near Foster
- SR 63 in Foster; US 41 in Veedersburg; US 231 in Crawfordsville
- East end: I-74 / I-465 in Speedway

Location
- Country: United States
- State: Indiana
- Counties: Vermillion, Warren, Fountain, Montgomery, Boone, Hendricks, Marion

Highway system
- United States Numbered Highway System; List; Special; Divided; Indiana State Highway System; Interstate; US; State; Scenic
← SR 135	→ SR 140

U.S. Route 136 (US 136) is a part of the United States Numbered Highway that runs from Edison, Nebraska, to Speedway, Indiana. In Indiana, it is part of the Indiana State Road system that enters between Danville, Illinois, and Foster, Indiana. The 75.30 miles (121.2 km) of US 136 that lie within Indiana serve as a major conduit. Some sections of the highway are listed on the National Highway System. Various sections are rural two-lane highway and urbanized four-lane divided highways. The easternmost community along the highway is Speedway, near Indianapolis.

US 136 passes through farm fields and woodlands, and along the central part of Indiana. The highway was first designated as a US Highway in 1932. It replaced the original State Road 33 designation of the highway that dated back to the formation of the Indiana state road system. SR 33 ran from the Illinois to Crawfordsville. US 136 also replaced the second designation of the highway, State Road 34 from the Illinois state line to Crawfordsville to Brownsburg and ended in Indianapolis.

== Route description ==
US 136 enters Indiana from Illinois heading due east, before turning northeast. The highway turns back due east and has an interchange at State Road 63 (SR 63). East of SR 63 the road passes over the Wabash River and enters Covington. While in Covington the route turns south passing through residential properties, as a two-lane highway. Before leaving Covington the highway turns southeasterly, passing through farmland. Between Covington and Veedersburg the highway passes over Interstate 74 (I–74). The road enters Veedersburg and begins a short concurrency with US 41, heading due south. US 136 leaves US 41 turning due east, before turning southeasterly. The highway has a short concurrency with SR 25 in Waynetown. East of Waynetown the route heads toward Crawfordsville passing through farmland, with a few houses. The highway enters Crawfordsville from the northwest as a two-lane highway, passing through mainly residential. The road curves due east having a traffic light at US 231. This traffic light is also the western end of the SR 32 and SR 47 concurrences. The concurrency with both state roads end when US 136 turns southeasterly and the state roads keeping heading easterly. The highway heads southeasterly as a two-lane highway, passing through farmland with some woodlands mix in. The route enters Brownsburg at a traffic light with SR 267. After Brownsburg the highway crosses the CSX Railroad tracks. Before entering Marion County the route passes by the Lucas Oil Raceway. After the raceway the highway enters Marion County and the town of Clermont. When the route enters Marion the local name becomes Crawfordsville Road. The road leaves Clermont and enters Indianapolis, as a four-lane divided highway, passing through mainly commercial properties. The road enters the town of Speedway and has an interchange with I–74 and I–465. US 136 ends at this interchange and Crawfordsville Road continues in an east-southeasterly direction, as a city street. Crawfordsville Road ends at Sixteenth Street, near the Indianapolis Motor Speedway.

The only segment of US 136 that is included as a part of the National Highway System (NHS) is the segment concurrent with US 231. The NHS is a network of highways that are identified as being most important for the economy, mobility and defense of the nation. The highway is maintained by the Indiana Department of Transportation (INDOT) like all other U.S. Highways in the state. The department tracks the traffic volumes along all state highways as a part of its maintenance responsibilities using a metric called average annual daily traffic (AADT). This measurement is a calculation of the traffic level along a segment of roadway for any average day of the year. In 2010, INDOT figured that lowest traffic levels were the 1,200 vehicles and 60 commercial vehicles used the highway daily between New Ross and Jamestown. The peak traffic volumes were 21,350 vehicles and 1,090 commercial vehicles AADT along the section of US 136 at the eastern terminus of US 136.

== History ==
State Road 34
- Location: Illinois state line near Foster to Indianapolis
- Existed: 1926–1950

In 1918, SR 33 was commission along what is now US 136, from Illinois state line to Crawfordsville. The route was extended southeast to Indianapolis and the number changed to SR 34 on October 1, 1926 Also in that year the first section was paved, from Illinois state line to Veedersburg. By 1928 the eastern part of the road from Crawfordsville to Indianapolis was paved, leaving only between Veedersburg and Crawfordsville unpaved. In 1931, the highway was paved between Veedersburg and Crawfordsville. SR 34 was renumbered US 136 in 1950. U.S. 136 met its parent route, U.S. 36 at the intersection of Dr. Martin Luther King, Jr. and 16th Streets. The highway had the eastern terminus moved from downtown Indianapolis to Speedway in 1991, at an interchange with I–74 and I–465.

== Major intersections ==
County	Location	mi	km	Destinations	Notes
Vermillion	Highland Township	0.000	0.000	US 136 west – Danville	Illinois state line
Warren	Mound Township	4.629	7.450	SR 63 – Terre Haute	
Fountain	Veedersburg	16.269	26.182	US 41 north – Williamsport	Northern end of US 41 concurrency
Fountain	Veedersburg	16.906	27.208	US 41 south – Terre Haute	Southern end of US 41 concurrency
Fountain	Hillsboro	21.334	34.334	SR 341 south – Wallace	Western end of SR 341 concurrency
Fountain	Hillsboro	21.949	35.323	SR 341 north – Newtown	Eastern end of SR 341 concurrency
Montgomery	Waynetown	26.603	42.813	SR 25 south – Lafayette	Western end of SR 25 concurrency
Montgomery	Waynetown	27.109	43.628	SR 25 south	Eastern end of SR 25 concurrency
Montgomery	Crawfordsville	36.523	58.778	US 231 / SR 32 west / SR 47 south – Greencastle	Western end of SR 32 and SR 47 concurrencies
Montgomery	Crawfordsville	37.184	59.842	SR 32 east / SR 47 north – Lebanon, Thorntown	Eastern end of SR 32 and SR 47 concurrencies
Boone	Jamestown	53.688	86.402	SR 75 / SR 234 west – New Winchester, Ladoga, Thorntown	Eastern terminus of SR 234
Hendricks	Lizton	59.058	95.045	SR 39 – Danville, Lebanon	
Marion	Indianapolis	73.855	118.858	SR 134 south / Girls School Road	Northern terminus of SR 134
Marion	Speedway	74.592– 74.930	120.044– 120.588	I-74 / I-465 – Indianapolis; Crawsfordville Road	Eastern terminus of US 136
1.000 mi = 1.609 km; 1.000 km = 0.621 mi: Concurrency terminus

== See also ==
- U.S. Route 36
- State Road 334

U.S. Route 136
Previous state: Illinois	Indiana	Next state: Terminus
