= Randolph Central School Corporation =

School district in Indiana

Coordinates: 40.1727°N 84.9799°W

Location
- Randolph County, Indiana United States

District information
- Type: Public
- Grades: PreK–12
- Established: 1962
- Schools: 5

Students and staff
- Students: 1,766 (2008–09)
- Teachers: 109.0 (on FTE basis)
- Student–teacher ratio: 16.2:1

Other information
- Website: www.rc.k12.in.us

Randolph Central School Corporation is the largest public school district in Randolph County, Indiana. It serves students in Franklin, Ward, and White River Townships and includes the City of Winchester and the incorporated towns of Ridgeville and Saratoga. The corporation was organized in 1962 as a community school corporation under the provisions of Indiana's School Reorganization Act of 1959. Currently (2013) the district includes one high school, Winchester Community High School, one middle school, Lee L. Driver Middle School, and three elementary schools, Oscar R. Baker School, Willard School, and Deerfield School. The district is governed by a five-member board of school trustees. Mr. Rolland Abraham is the superintendent of the district.
