= Cain Township, Fountain County, Indiana =

Cain Township
- Township
- Coordinates: 40°04′59″N 87°09′06″W
- Country: United States
- State: Indiana
- County: Fountain

Government
  - Type: Indiana township

Area
  - Total: 39.96 sq mi (103.5 km^{2})
  - Land: 39.93 sq mi (103.4 km^{2})
  - Water: 0.03 sq mi (0.078 km^{2})
- Elevation: 728 ft (222 m)

Population (2020)
  - Total: 1,112
  - Density: 27.85/sq mi (10.75/km^{2})
- FIPS code: 18-09748
- GNIS feature ID: 453152

Cain Township is one of eleven townships in Fountain County, Indiana. As of the 2020 census, its population was 1,112 and it contained 478 housing units.

Historical population
Census	Pop.	Note	%±
1890	1,509		—
1900	1,537		1.9%
1910	1,403		−8.7%
1920	1,359		−3.1%
1930	1,179		−13.2%
1940	1,183		0.3%
1950	1,133		−4.2%
1960	1,053		−7.1%
1970	1,023		−2.8%
1980	1,242		21.4%
1990	1,160		−6.6%
2000	1,090		−6.0%
2010	1,142		4.8%
2020	1,112		−2.6%
Source: US Decennial Census

== History ==
Cain Township was one of the first townships to be established in the county; it was established on July 24, 1826. At that time, much of the land was forested, but 100 years later most of the land was used for agriculture. There were also several grain and lumber mills along Coal Creek, but these also were gone by the early 20th century. The town of Hillsboro was laid out in the 1830s and still exists; the town of Rynear was established in the far northwest corner of the township, but was gone by the early 1900s. The township's population was 1,763 in 1880, 1,537 in 1900, and 1,403 in 1910.

== Geography ==
According to the 2010 census, the township has a total area of 39.96 square miles (103.5 km^{2}), of which 39.93 square miles (103.4 km^{2}) (or 99.92%) is land and 0.03 square miles (0.078 km^{2}) (or 0.08%) is water. There is a single settlement in the township: the town of Hillsboro, which has a population of about 500 (about half the township's total population). This lies at the intersection of the east–west U.S. Route 136 and the north–south Indiana State Road 341, in the northern part of the township. Interstate 74 passes from east to west less than 1 mile (1.6 km) north of Hillsboro. Indiana State Road 32 runs along a portion of the southern border of the township.

Map of Cain Township

=== Cemeteries ===
The township contains three cemeteries. Rose Hill to the north and Spring Hill lie to the south of Hillsboro, while Scotts Prairie is in the far southwest corner of the township.
