= Indiana State Road 28 =

Highway in Indiana

State Road 28
- SR 28 highlighted in red

Route information
- Maintained by INDOT
- Length: 152.824 mi (245.946 km)
- Existed: October 1, 1926–present

Major junctions
- West end: IL 119 west of West Lebanon
- US 231 at Romney; US 52 west of Frankfort; I-65 west of Frankfort; US 421 in Frankfort; US 31 west of Tipton; I-69 east of Alexandria; US 35 north of Muncie; US 27 in Deerfield
- East end: SR 571 in Union City

Location
- Country: United States
- State: Indiana
- Counties: Warren, Fountain, Tippecanoe, Clinton, Tipton, Madison, Delaware, Randolph

Highway system
- Indiana State Highway System; Interstate; US; State; Scenic
← US 27	→ SR 29

State Road 28 is an east–west road in central Indiana in the United States that crosses the entire state from east to west, covering a distance of about 153 miles (246 km) and passing about 20 miles (32 km) to the north of the state capital of Indianapolis.

== Route description ==
The western terminus of State Road 28 is at the Illinois state line, where it continues the route of Illinois Route 119, about 7.5 miles (12.1 km) west of West Lebanon. The eastern terminus is at the Ohio state line, where Ohio State Route 571 continues the route, near State Road 32 in the border-town of Union City. For most of its length it is an undivided two-lane road which mainly travels through flat, open farm land, avoiding the hillier and more wooded areas that begin not far to the south. It is divided for about 1 mile (1.6 km) just west of Frankfort, where it passes the Frankfort Municipal Airport.

State Road 28 has concurrencies with four U.S. routes, as well as four other Indiana state roads; these are described below.

== History ==
Before 1926 the SR 28 designation was routed between Petersburg and Bloomfield, along modern SR 57. In 1926 SR 28 was moved to current routing, replacing SR 19 between US 31 and Alexandria and SR 33 from Muncie to the Ohio state line. The state road was extended west to the Illinois state line in either 1927 or 1928. Between 1931 and 1932 the section between Muncie and Ohio state line became SR 32 and SR 28 ended at SR 67, northeast of Muncie. The modern roadway east of Albany to the Ohio state line was proposed to be added to the state road system in this time frame. In 1932 SR 28 between Albany and the Ohio state line was added to the state road system. At this time the roadway from Williamsport to SR 25 and from US 52 to Albany was paved. The roadway west of Williamsport was paved in either 1934 and 1935. Between 1966 and 1967 the road between SR 25 and US 52 and from Albany to Union City was paved.

== Major intersections ==
County	Location	mi	km	Destinations	Notes
Warren	Steuben Township	0.000	0.000	IL 119 west	Western terminus of SR 28 at Illinois state line
Warren	Pike Township	6.637	10.681	SR 63 – Terre Haute, Hammond	
Warren	West Lebanon	7.561	12.168	SR 263 – West Lebanon	
Warren	Williamsport	14.107	22.703	US 41 north – Hammond	Western end of US 41 concurrency
Warren	Attica	15.409	24.798	SR 55 north – Fowler	Western end of SR 55 concurrency
Fountain	Attica	16.845	27.109	US 41 south / SR 55 south – Rockville, Newtown	Eastern end of US 41 and SR 55 concurrences
Fountain	Davis Township	22.209	35.742	SR 341 south – Newtown	Northern terminus of SR 341
Tippecanoe	Odell	26.151	42.086	SR 25 south – Waynetown	Southern end of SR 25 concurrency
Tippecanoe	Odell	26.651	42.891	SR 25 north – Lafayette	Northern end of SR 25 concurrency
Tippecanoe	Romney	37.471	60.304	US 231 – Crawfordsville, Lafayette	
Tippecanoe	Lauramie Township	47.865	77.031	US 52 north – Lafayette	Western end of US 52 concurrency
Tippecanoe	Lauramie Township	48.411	77.910	US 52 south – Indianapolis	Eastern end of US 52 concurrency
Clinton	Washington Township	50.765– 50.915	81.698– 81.940	I-65 – Indianapolis, Lafayette, Gary	
Clinton	Frankfort	58.800	94.629	US 421 north / SR 38 / SR 39 – Delphi, Lebanon, Noblesville	Western end of US 421 concurrency
Clinton	Michigan Township	59.290	95.418	SR 29 north – Logansport	Southern terminus of SR 29
Clinton	Michigan Township	65.424	105.290	US 421 south	Eastern end of US 421 concurrency
Tipton	Jefferson Township	79.582	128.075	US 31 – Indianapolis, Kokomo, South Bend	
Tipton	Tipton	84.294	135.658	SR 19 south – Noblesville	Western end of SR 19 concurrency
Tipton	Tipton	84.760	136.408	SR 19 north – Peru	Eastern end of SR 19 concurrency
Tipton	Hobbs	88.862	143.010	SR 213 – Noblesville, Greentown	
Madison	Elwood	94.883	152.699	SR 13 – Fortville, Wabash	
Madison	Elwood	96.489	155.284	SR 37 – Noblesville, Marion	
Madison	Alexandria	103.819	167.080	SR 9 – Anderson, Marion	
Delaware	Harrison Township	109.690– 109.739	176.529– 176.608	I-69 north / US 35 – Indianapolis, Fort Wayne	Western end of US 35 concurrency
Delaware	Hamilton Township	119.800	192.799	US 35 south / SR 3 – Muncie, Hartford City	Eastern end of US 35 concurrency
Delaware	Delaware Township	122.547	197.220	SR 67 south – Muncie	Western end of SR 67 concurrency
Delaware	Albany	126.699	203.902	SR 67 north – Portland	Eastern end of SR 67 concurrency
Randolph	Green Township	132.166	212.701	SR 1 – Cambridge, Bluffton	
Randolph	Deerfield	141.792	228.192	US 27 – Winchester, Decatur, Fort Wayne	
Randolph	Union City	152.627	245.629	SR 32 east To SR 47 east – Union City	Northern end of SR 32 concurrency
Randolph	Union City	152.627	245.629	SR 32 west – Winchester	Southern end of SR 32 concurrency
Randolph	Union City	152.824	245.946	SR 571 east – Greenville	Eastern terminus of SR 28 at the Ohio State Line
1.000 mi = 1.609 km; 1.000 km = 0.621 mi: Concurrency terminus
