= Romine Corner, Indiana =

- Ghost town
- Location in Warren County
- Coordinates: 40°08′31″N 87°26′00″W
- Country: United States
- State: Indiana
- County: Warren
- Township: Mound
- Elevation: 568 ft (173 m)
- Time zone: UTC-5 (Eastern (EST))
  - Summer (DST): UTC-4 (EDT)
- ZIP code: 47932
- Area code: 765
- GNIS feature ID: 442270

Romine Corner is an extinct town that was located in Mound Township in Warren County, Indiana, west of the town of Covington.

A few buildings in the community exist, and it is still cited by the USGS. Auto parts manufacturer Flex-N-Gate operates a facility near the site.

== Geography ==
Romine Corner is located at 40°08′31″N 87°26′0″W at the corner of US Route 136 and Warren County Road 600 West. The site is near both State Road 63 to the west and Interstate 74 to the south. The Wabash River flows northeast of Romine Corner.
