= Franklin Township, Indiana =

Franklin Township is the name of seventeen townships in the U.S. state of Indiana:

- Franklin Township, DeKalb County, Indiana
- Franklin Township, Floyd County, Indiana
- Franklin Township, Grant County, Indiana
- Franklin Township, Harrison County, Indiana
- Franklin Township, Hendricks County, Indiana
- Franklin Township, Henry County, Indiana
- Franklin Township, Johnson County, Indiana
- Franklin Township, Kosciusko County, Indiana
- Franklin Township, Marion County, Indiana
- Franklin Township, Montgomery County, Indiana
- Franklin Township, Owen County, Indiana
- Franklin Township, Pulaski County, Indiana
- Franklin Township, Putnam County, Indiana
- Franklin Township, Randolph County, Indiana
- Franklin Township, Ripley County, Indiana
- Franklin Township, Washington County, Indiana
- Franklin Township, Wayne County, Indiana
