= Davis Township, Fountain County, Indiana =

Davis Township
- Township
- Location of Davis Township in Fountain County
- Coordinates: 40°18′27″N 87°07′42″W
- Country: United States
- State: Indiana
- County: Fountain

Government
  - Type: Indiana township

Area
  - Total: 23.71 sq mi (61.4 km^{2})
  - Land: 23.54 sq mi (61.0 km^{2})
  - Water: 0.17 sq mi (0.44 km^{2})
- Elevation: 712 ft (217 m)

Population (2020)
  - Total: 564
  - Density: 24.0/sq mi (9.25/km^{2})
- FIPS code: 18-16912
- GNIS feature ID: 453253

Davis Township is one of eleven townships in Fountain County, Indiana, United States. As of the 2020 census, its population was 564 and it contained 285 housing units.

Historical population
Census	Pop.	Note	%±
1890	676		—
1900	773		14.3%
1910	702		−9.2%
1920	624		−11.1%
1930	582		−6.7%
1940	570		−2.1%
1950	543		−4.7%
1960	554		2.0%
1970	540		−2.5%
1980	571		5.7%
1990	527		−7.7%
2000	635		20.5%
2010	682		7.4%
2020	564		−17.3%
Source: US Decennial Census

== Geography ==
According to the 2010 census, the township has a total area of 23.71 square miles (61.4 km^{2}), of which 23.54 square miles (61.0 km^{2}) (or 99.28%) is land and 0.17 square miles (0.44 km^{2}) (or 0.72%) is water. It contains no incorporated settlements but four unincorporated ones. Both Maysville Crossing and Riverside lie in the northwest part of the township along the Norfolk Southern Railway line; Riverside is across the Wabash River from Independence in neighboring Warren County. Roberts is in the eastern part of the township, and Vine is near the center. There is a naturally occurring hollow in the Township known as Possum Holler. It's a ready-made weather break for those who live there and a lovely drive for those passing through. The area is rich in a wide variety of indigenous flora and fauna. Many locals refuse to live anywhere else calling the Holler home for generations

Indiana State Road 28 crosses the south part of the township from east to west. Indiana State Road 341 begins at State Road 28 and runs south.

Map of Davis Township

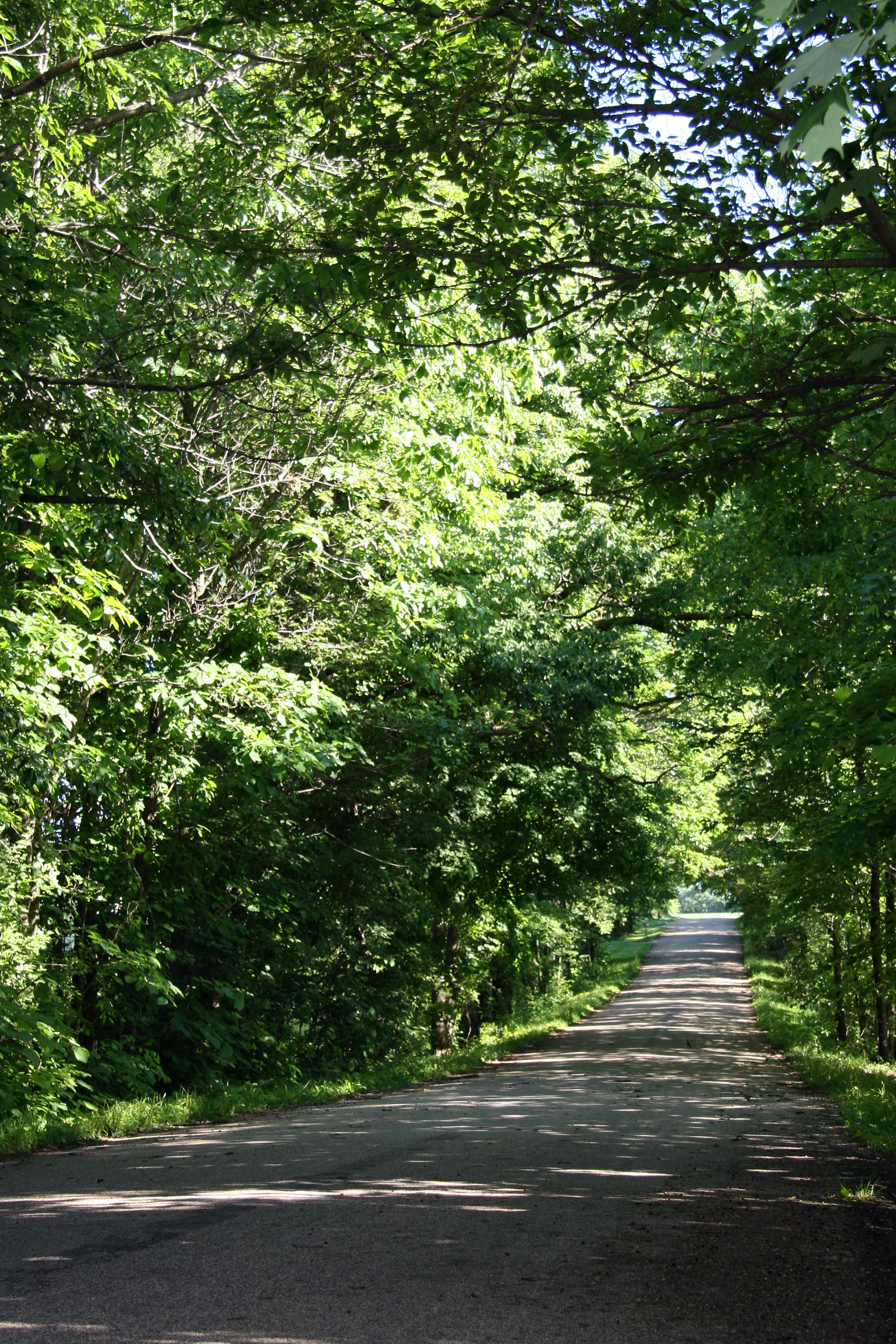
County Road 850 East north of Roberts

=== Cemeteries ===
The township contains Maysville Cemetery, to the southwest of Maysville Crossing. Salem Cemetery is also within Davis Township and is located southeast of the location marked Vine but north of State Rd 28.
