= Richland Township, Indiana =

Richland Township is the name of thirteen townships in the U.S. state of Indiana:

- Richland Township, Benton County, Indiana
- Richland Township, DeKalb County, Indiana
- Richland Township, Fountain County, Indiana
- Richland Township, Fulton County, Indiana
- Richland Township, Grant County, Indiana
- Richland Township, Greene County, Indiana
- Richland Township, Jay County, Indiana
- Richland Township, Madison County, Indiana
- Richland Township, Miami County, Indiana
- Richland Township, Monroe County, Indiana
- Richland Township, Rush County, Indiana
- Richland Township, Steuben County, Indiana
- Richland Township, Whitley County, Indiana
