= Indiana State Road 32 =

Highway in Indiana

State Road 32
- SR 32 highlighted in red

Route information
- Maintained by INDOT
- Length: 156.814 mi (252.368 km)
- Existed: October 1, 1926–present

Major junctions
- West end: CR 4 at the Illinois state line
- SR 63 near Perrysville; US 41 south of Veedersburg; US 231 in Crawfordsville; I-74 in Crawfordsville; I-65 / US 52 in Lebanon; US 421 near Rosston; US 31 in Westfield; SR 37 in Noblesville; I-69 in Chesterfield and Daleville; US 35 / SR 3 / SR 67 in Muncie; US 27 in Winchester
- East end: SR 47 in Union City

Location
- Country: United States
- State: Indiana
- Counties: Vermillion, Fountain, Montgomery, Boone, Hamilton, Madison, Delaware, Randolph

Highway system
- Indiana State Highway System; Interstate; US; State; Scenic
| ← US 31 | → US 33 |

State Road 32 (SR 32) in the U.S. state of Indiana is an east–west state highway in central Indiana that crosses the entire state, covering a distance of about 157 miles (253 km). The western terminus of SR 32 is at the Illinois state line, southeast of Danville, Illinois, where the state highway becomes a county road. The eastern terminus is at Union City, Indiana, and Union City, Ohio, at the Ohio state border where the highway becomes Ohio State Route 47. As of 2023, SR 32 is discontinuous in Muncie, Indiana.

== Route description ==
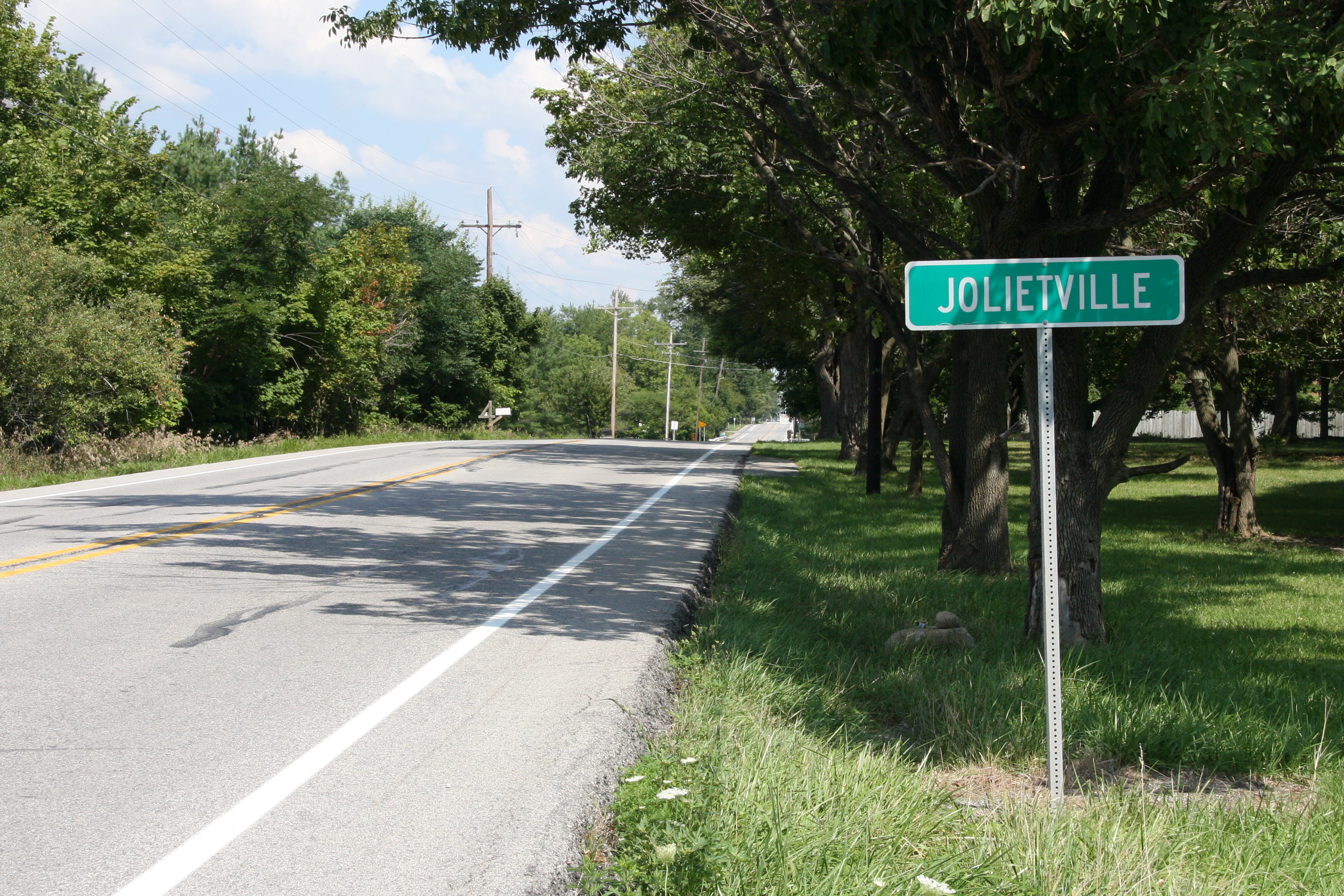
SR 32 in Jolietville, Indiana

Between the Illinois state line and Crawfordsville, the highway runs somewhat parallel to Interstate 74. East of Crawfordsville, the highway is a popular alternate route for traffic from parts north and northeast of Indianapolis heading for westbound I-74.

Between I-65 and Fishersburg, Indiana, SR 32 travels through Boone, Hamilton, and Madison counties. Continuing east from Fishersburg, SR 32 serves the towns of Lapel, Anderson, Muncie, Winchester, and Union City.

The vast majority of SR 32 is rural and undivided. Portions of SR 32 between Muncie and Selma are divided.

In 2023, the Indiana Department of Transportation (INDOT) relinquished control of State Road 32 within Muncie's city limits. The city assumed maintenance responsibilities for the route—which covers portions of Jackson Street, Main Street, and Kilgore Avenue—in exchange for state funding to manage the thoroughfare.

== Major intersections ==
| County | Location | mi | km | Destinations | Notes |
|---|---|---|---|---|---|
| Vermillion | Highland Township | 0.000 | 0.000 | Vermilion CR 4 | Western terminus of SR 32 at the Illinois state line |
| Vermillion | Perrysville | 4.454 | 7.168 | SR 63 – Terre Haute | |
| Fountain | Millcreek Township | 17.757 | 28.577 | US 41 – Terre Haute, Hammond | |
| Fountain | Jackson Township | 22.338 | 35.950 | SR 341 north – Hillsboro | Northern end of SR 341 concurrency |
| Fountain | Jackson Township | 22.439 | 36.112 | SR 341 south – Wallace | Southern end of SR 341 concurrency |
| Montgomery | Ripley Township | 27.784 | 44.714 | SR 25 north – Waynetown, Lafayette | Southern terminus of SR 25 |
| Montgomery | Crawfordsville | 35.846 | 57.689 | SR 47 south – Waveland | Western end of SR 47 concurrency |
| Montgomery | Crawfordsville | 36.021 | 57.970 | US 231 south – Greencastle | Southern end of US 231 concurrency |
| Montgomery | Crawfordsville | 37.258 | 59.961 | US 231 north / US 136 west – Lafayette, Covington | Western end of US 136 and northern end of US 231 concurrencies |
| Montgomery | Crawfordsville | 37.918 | 61.023 | US 136 east – Speedway | Eastern end of US 136 concurrency |
| Montgomery | Crawfordsville | 38.645 | 62.193 | SR 47 north | Eastern end of SR 47 concurrency |
| Montgomery | Union Township | 41.890– 42.120 | 67.415– 67.786 | I-74 – Indianapolis, Danville, IL. | Exit 39 on I-74 |
| Boone | Jefferson Township | 52.429 | 84.376 | SR 75 – Jamestown, Thorntown | |
| Boone | Lebanon | 59.425– 59.584 | 95.635– 95.891 | I-65 / US 52 – Indianapolis, Gary | Exit 140 on I-65 |
| Boone | Lebanon | 60.587 | 97.505 | SR 39 – Danville, Frankfort | |
| Boone | Lebanon | 70.577 | 113.583 | US 421 – Indianapolis, Frankfort | |
| Hamilton | Westfield | 78.407– 78.541 | 126.184– 126.399 | US 31 – Indianapolis, Kokomo, South Bend | |
| Hamilton | Noblesville | 84.487 | 135.969 | SR 38 west – Frankfort, Lafayette | Western end of SR 38 concurrency |
| Hamilton | Noblesville | 84.801 | 136.474 | SR 19 north – Peru | Southern terminus of SR 19 |
| Hamilton | Noblesville | 86.124 | 138.603 | SR 37 – Indianapolis, Elwood, Marion | |
| Hamilton | Noblesville | 87.209 | 140.349 | SR 38 east – Pendleton | Eastern end of SR 38 concurrency |
| Madison | Lapel | 93.651 | 150.717 | SR 13 – Fortville, Elwood, Wabash | |
| Madison | Anderson | 105.569 | 169.897 | SR 9 south / SR 232 east – Pendleton | Southern end of SR 9 concurrency; western terminus of SR 232 |
| Madison | Anderson | 107.021 | 172.234 | SR 9 north – Marion | Northern end of SR 9 concurrency |
| Delaware | Chesterfield | 111.345– 111.741 | 179.192– 179.830 | I-69 – Indianapolis, Fort Wayne | Exit 234 on I-69 |
| Delaware | Muncie | 126.096– 126.308 | 202.932– 203.273 | US 35 / SR 3 / SR 67 – Indianapolis, Hartford City | SR 32 is discontinuous through the city of Muncie: ending at Glendale Dr and beginning again at US 35/SR 3/SR 67 |
| Randolph | Farmland | 137.248 | 220.879 | SR 1 north – Bluffton | Northern end of SR 1 concurrency |
| Randolph | Farmland | 138.551 | 222.976 | SR 1 south – Cambridge City | Southern end of SR 1 concurrency |
| Randolph | Winchester | 147.029 | 236.620 | US 27 – Richmond, Fort Wayne | |
| Randolph | Wayne Township | 154.746 | 249.040 | SR 227 south | North end of SR 227 |
| Randolph | Union City | 156.589 | 252.006 | SR 28 east To SR 571 east – Union City, Greenville | Southern end of SR 28 concurrency |
| Randolph | Union City | 156.698 | 252.181 | SR 28 west – Albany | Northern end of SR 28 concurrency |
| Randolph | Union City | 156.814 | 252.368 | SR 47 east – Union City, Ansonia | Eastern terminus of SR 32 Ohio state line |
1.000 mi = 1.609 km; 1.000 km = 0.621 mi: Concurrency terminus
