= Richland Township, Fountain County, Indiana =

Richland Township
- Township
- Location of Richland Township in Fountain County
- Coordinates: 40°12′06″N 87°08′41″W
- Country: United States
- State: Indiana
- County: Fountain

Government
  - Type: Indiana township

Area
  - Total: 51.94 sq mi (134.5 km^{2})
  - Land: 51.94 sq mi (134.5 km^{2})
  - Water: 0 sq mi (0 km^{2})
- Elevation: 720 ft (220 m)

Population (2020)
  - Total: 842
  - Density: 16.2/sq mi (6.26/km^{2})
- FIPS code: 18-64026
- GNIS feature ID: 453791

Richland Township is one of eleven townships in Fountain County, Indiana, United States. As of the 2020 census, its population was 842 and it contained 384 housing units.

Historical population
Census	Pop.	Note	%±
1890	1,981		—
1900	1,869		−5.7%
1910	1,904		1.9%
1920	1,772		−6.9%
1930	1,512		−14.7%
1940	1,491		−1.4%
1950	1,405		−5.8%
1960	1,446		2.9%
1970	1,307		−9.6%
1980	1,149		−12.1%
1990	1,015		−11.7%
2000	908		−10.5%
2010	950		4.6%
2020	842		−11.4%
Source: US Decennial Census

== Geography ==
According to the 2010 census, the township has a total area of 51.94 square miles (134.5 km^{2}), all land. It contains two incorporated towns: Newtown, with a population of about 250, lies near the center of the township; Mellott, with about 200 people, is about 2 miles (3.2 km) south. Indiana State Road 341 passes through both towns; Indiana State Road 55 intersects State Road 341 in Newtown. The two unincorporated communities of Graham and Stephens Crossing both lie to the southwest of Newtown along the route of a former railroad which came out of Veedersburg and also passed through Mellott and continued east.

Map of Richland Township

=== Cemeteries ===
The township contains these seven cemeteries: Greenbay, Hodson, Newtown, Oak Ridge, Old Baptist, Quirk and Short.
