= Indiana State Road 134 =

State highway in Indiana, United States

State Road 134
- Girls School Road
- SR 134 highlighted in red

Route information
- Maintained by INDOT
- Length: 0.379 mi (610 m)

Major junctions
- South end: Girls School Road in Indianapolis
- North end: US 136 in Indianapolis

Location
- Country: United States
- State: Indiana
- Counties: Marion

Highway system
- Indiana State Highway System; Interstate; US; State; Scenic
← US 131	→ SR 135

State Road 134 is a very short north–south state road in Marion County.

== Route description ==
State Road 134 begins at the Indiana Women's Prison and directly runs north to U.S. Route 136 (Crawfordsville Road), a distance of 0.37 miles (0.60 km).

== History ==
SR 134 was added to the state road system between late 1930 and 1931, on the same route as it currently takes, within its first year the road was treated with oil. The road entire length of SR 134 was paved in 1932. Since the early 1930s not much has changed with SR 134.

== Major intersections ==
The entire route is in Indianapolis, Marion County.

mi	km	Destinations	Notes
0.000	0.000	Girls School Road south	Southern terminus of SR 134
0.379	0.610	US 136	Northern terminus of SR 134
1.000 mi = 1.609 km; 1.000 km = 0.621 mi
