= Ridgeville, Indiana =

- Town
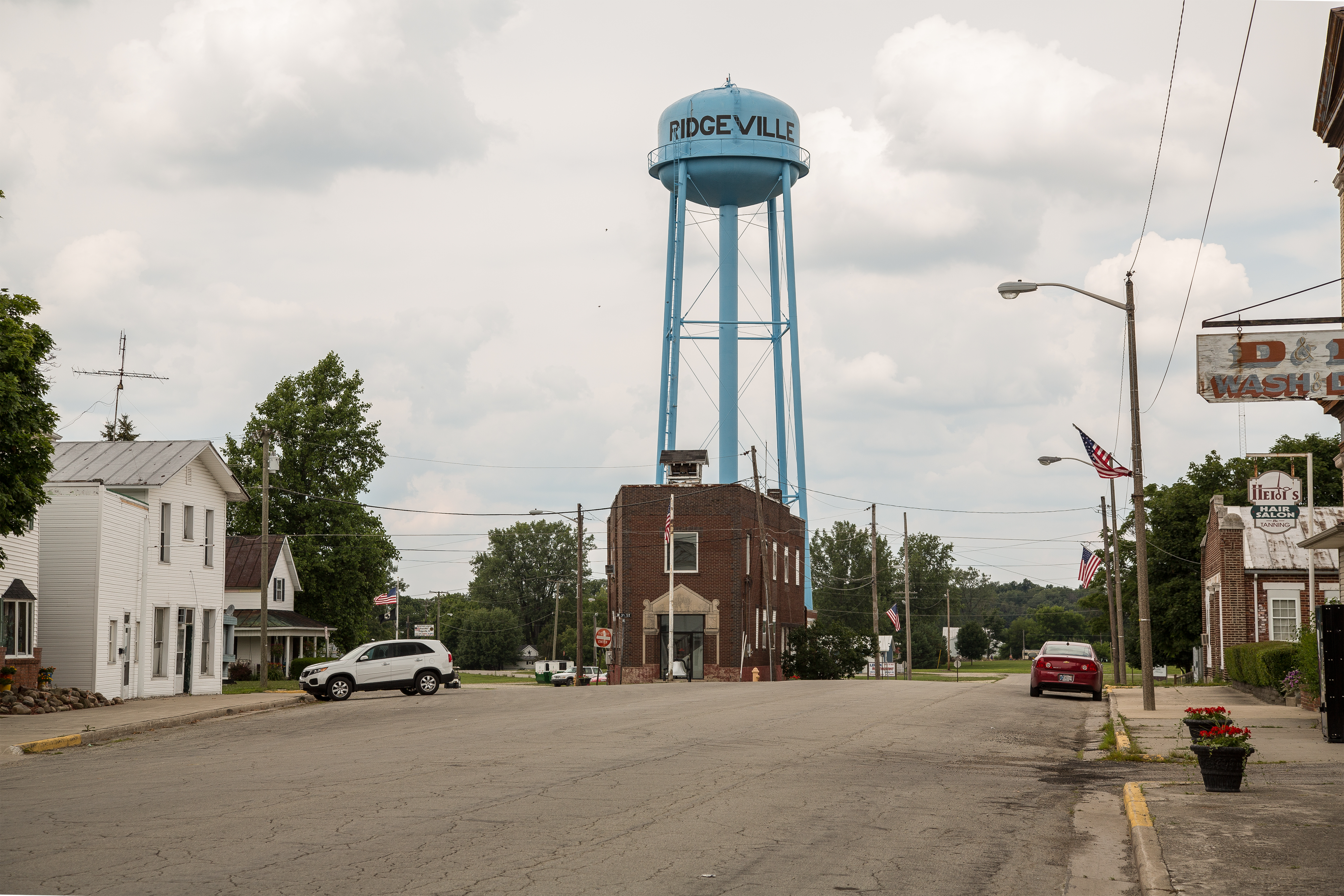

- Location of Ridgeville in Randolph County, Indiana.
- Coordinates: 40°17′31″N 85°01′42″W
- Country: United States
- State: Indiana
- County: Randolph
- Township: Franklin

Area
  - Total: 0.56 sq mi (1.44 km^{2})
  - Land: 0.56 sq mi (1.44 km^{2})
  - Water: 0 sq mi (0.00 km^{2})
- Elevation: 994 ft (303 m)

Population (2020)
  - Total: 688
  - Estimate (2025): 678 ▼
  - Density: 1,240.6/sq mi (478.98/km^{2})
- Time zone: UTC-5 (Eastern (EST))
  - Summer (DST): UTC-4 (EDT)
- ZIP code: 47380
- Area code: 765
- FIPS code: 18-64422
- GNIS feature ID: 2396878

Ridgeville is a town in Franklin Township, Randolph County, Indiana, United States, along the Mississinewa River. The population was 688 at the 2020 census.

== History ==
A post office called Ridgeville has been in operation since 1851. The town was named for its lofty elevation. Joab Ward, an old Settler to Ridgeville since 1819, originally laid out the village of Ridgeville, Randolph County, Indiana in 1854.

== Geography ==
According to the 2010 census, Ridgeville has a total area of 0.55 square miles (1.42 km^{2}), all land.

== Demographics ==
Historical population
Census	Pop.	Note	%±
1870	716		—
1880	775		8.2%
1890	922		19.0%
1910	440		—
1920	1,042		136.8%
1930	909		−12.8%
1940	1,003		10.3%
1950	950		−5.3%
1960	950		0.0%
1970	924		−2.7%
1980	933		1.0%
1990	808		−13.4%
2000	843		4.3%
2010	803		−4.7%
2020	688		−14.3%
2025 (est.)	678	▼	−1.5%
U.S. Decennial Census

=== 2010 census ===
As of the census of 2010, there were 803 people, 323 households, and 219 families living in the town. The population density was 1,433.9 inhabitants per square mile (553.6/km^{2}). There were 371 housing units at an average density of 662.5 per square mile (255.8/km^{2}). The racial makeup of the town was 97.4% White, 0.4% Native American, 0.4% Asian, 0.2% from other races, and 1.6% from two or more races. Hispanic or Latino of any race were 0.6% of the population.

There were 323 households, of which 35.6% had children under the age of 18 living with them, 46.7% were married couples living together, 15.8% had a female householder with no husband present, 5.3% had a male householder with no wife present, and 32.2% were non-families. 28.2% of all households were made up of individuals, and 12.1% had someone living alone who was 65 years of age or older. The average household size was 2.49 and the average family size was 3.01.

The median age in the town was 35.1 years. 28.1% of residents were under the age of 18; 8.5% were between the ages of 18 and 24; 26.2% were from 25 to 44; 22.9% were from 45 to 64; and 14.3% were 65 years of age or older. The gender makeup of the town was 50.8% male and 49.2% female.

=== 2000 census ===
As of the census of 2000, there were 843 people, 340 households, and 234 families living in the town. The population density was 1,429.4 inhabitants per square mile (551.9/km^{2}). There were 368 housing units at an average density of 624.0 per square mile (240.9/km^{2}). The racial makeup of the town was 99.76% White, 0.12% Native American, and 0.12% from two or more races. Hispanic or Latino of any race were 0.24% of the population.

There were 340 households, out of which 32.4% had children under the age of 18 living with them, 52.9% were married couples living together, 10.9% had a female householder with no husband present, and 30.9% were non-families. 25.9% of all households were made up of individuals, and 11.5% had someone living alone who was 65 years of age or older. The average household size was 2.48 and the average family size was 2.97.

In the town, the population was spread out, with 26.1% under the age of 18, 10.6% from 18 to 24, 27.9% from 25 to 44, 23.0% from 45 to 64, and 12.5% who were 65 years of age or older. The median age was 34 years. For every 100 females, there were 99.8 males. For every 100 females age 18 and over, there were 97.8 males.

The median income for a household in the town was $33,819, and the median income for a family was $40,547. Males had a median income of $27,596 compared to $24,107 for females. The per capita income for the town was $14,547. About 7.4% of families and 8.3% of the population were below the poverty line, including 7.9% of those under the age of 18 and 9.2% of those 65 and older.

== Education ==
It is in the Randolph Central School Corporation.

The town has a lending library, the Ridgeville Public Library.

== Notable person ==
- Alva L. Kitselman, industrialist and barbed wire manufacturer.
- Wendell Meredith Stanley (1904–1971), co-recipient of the 1946 Nobel Prize in Chemistry, was born in Ridgeville.
