= Alva Kitselman House =

Historic house in Indiana, United States

- U.S. National Register of Historic Places
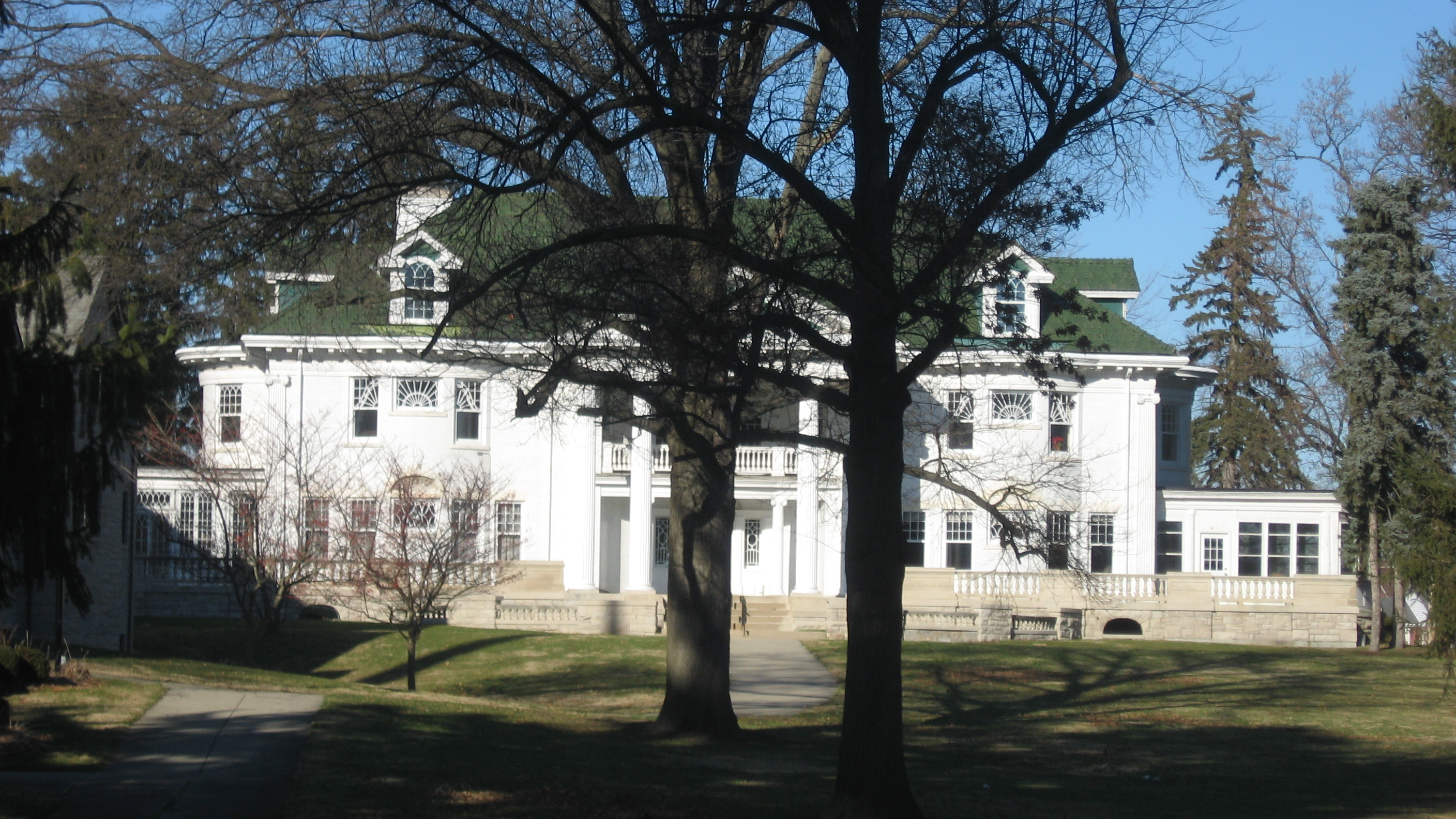
- Alva Kitselman House, January 2012

- Location within Indiana Location within the United States
- Location: 1400 W. University Ave., Muncie, Indiana
- Coordinates: 40°11′54″N 85°24′04″W
- Area: 8 acres (3.2 ha)
- Built: 1915
- Architectural style: Colonial Revival
- NRHP reference No.: 94001105
- Added to NRHP: September 8, 1994

The Alva Kitselman House, also known as Hazelwood Christian Church, Parlour @ Hazelwood, or simply Hazelwood is a historic home and church located at Muncie, Indiana. It was built in 1915, and is a 2 1/2-story, "L"-plan, Colonial Revival style brick mansion. It features a central portico with Ionic order columns and consists of a hipped roof main block with 2 1/2-story rear service wing. Also on the property are the contributing carriage house and decorative steel fence. The property was acquired by Parlour Salon Group in 2018.

The home was named for Alva L. Kitselman, a prominent industrialist and businessman from Muncie who earned his fortune during the Indiana gas boom. Born in Randolph County, Indiana, Alva Kitselman and his family operated the Kitselman Brothers Wire Fence Company in Ridgeville. The Kitselman brothers later founded the Indiana Wire & Steel Company, which made a great deal of money thanks to the increased demand for barbed wire following the American intervention in World War I. Alva Kitselman purchased part of a tract of land known as "Calvert's Woods" in Muncie and had the home constructed upon this newly bought parcel. The abundance of hazelnut trees on the property gave the home its nickname of "Hazelwood." The property included a barn, for the purposes of housing livestock. Kitselman and his family lived in the home until the 1930s, when they moved to California. In 1950, after Kitselman's death, his widow sold the home. In 1951, the house became the "Hazelwood Christian Church", a Disciples of Christ church, which remains open to this day.

It was added to the National Register of Historic Places in 1994.
