= Randolph, Indiana =

- Unincorporated community
- Location within Indiana Location within the United States
- Coordinates: 40°15′58″N 84°58′33″W
- Country: United States
- State: Indiana
- County: Randolph
- Township: Ward
- Elevation: 1,007 ft (307 m)
- Time zone: UTC-5 (Eastern (EST))
  - Summer (DST): UTC-4 (EDT)
- ZIP code: 47380
- Area code: 765
- GNIS feature ID: 441763

Randolph is an unincorporated community in Ward Township, Randolph County, in the U.S. state of Indiana.

== History ==
Randolph was originally known as Randolph Station, and under the latter name was founded in 1836. A post office was established under the name Randolph in 1837, and remained in operation until it was discontinued in 1900.
