= Indiana State Road 55 =

State highway in Indiana, United States

State Road 55
- SR 55 highlighted in red

Route information
- Maintained by INDOT
- Length: 109.682 mi (176.516 km)
- Existed: October 1, 1926–present

Major junctions
- South end: SR 25 at Wingate
- US 41 near Attica; US 52 in Fowler; US 24 at Goodland; US 231 in Crown Point; US 30 in Merrillville
- North end: Ridge Road in Gary

Location
- Country: United States
- State: Indiana
- Counties: Montgomery, Fountain, Warren, Benton, Newton, Lake

Highway system
- Indiana State Highway System; Interstate; US; State; Scenic
← SR 54	→ SR 56

State Road 55 (SR 55) is a north–south road in Northern and Central Indiana. State Road 55 runs from the Crawfordsville area in the south to Gary in the north, a distance of approximately 110 miles (180 km).

== Route description ==
SR 55 southern terminus is at an intersection with State Road 25 (SR 25). SR 55 heads northwest towards Newtown where SR 55 has an intersection with State Road 341. SR 55 heads northwest out of Newtown towards U.S. Route 41 (US 41). SR 55 and US 41 are concurrent for 5.19 miles (8.35 km) through Attica. Northwest of Attica SR 55 leaves US 41 and heads north Oxford. North of Oxford, SR 55 has an intersection with U.S. Route 52 (US 52). US 52 and SR 55 are concurrent for 5.58 miles (8.98 km) until Fowler. In Fowler SR 55 leaves US 52 heading north towards Goodland. In Goodland SR 55 is concurrent with U.S. Route 24 (US 24). SR 55 heads north towards Crown Point passing through intersection with State Road 16, State Road 114, State Road 14, State Road 10, and State Road 2. In Crown Point SR 55 has an intersection with U.S. Route 231. SR 55 heads north after US 231 towards an intersection with Business US 6, the northern terminus of SR 55 is at this point. Lake County has other names for Indiana 55. In Gary, it is called Cleveland Street. In Merrillville, it is Taft Street. In Crown Point, it is Main Street.

== History ==
Between 1917 and 1926 SR 55 had a different route that follows the route that SR 2 takes today, from Hebron and Valparaiso. At this point the route that SR 55 takes today was of Old SR 8. In 1930, SR 55 and State Road 53 swapped routes in Lake County. At some point, the southern terminus of SR 55 was at the intersection with U.S. Route 136, approximately two miles west of Crawfordsville.

== Major intersections ==
County	Location	mi	km	Destinations	Notes
Montgomery	Wingate	0.000	0.000	SR 25 – Waynetown, Lafayette	Southern terminus of SR 55
Fountain	Newtown	4.576	7.364	SR 341 – Hillsboro	
Fountain	Shawnee Township	10.869	17.492	US 41 south – Veedersburg	Southern end of US 41 concurrency
Fountain	Attica	12.171	19.587	SR 28 east – Frankfort	Eastern end of SR 28 concurrency
Warren	Warren Township	16.062	25.849	US 41 north / SR 28 west – Hammond, Williamsport	Northern end of US 41 concurrency; Western end of SR 28 concurrency
Warren	Pine Village	24.040	38.689	SR 26 east – Lafayette	Southern end of SR 26 concurrency
Warren	Pine Village	24.277	39.070	SR 26 west	Northern end of SR 26 concurrency
Benton	Oxford	31.261	50.310	SR 352 west	Western end of SR 352 concurrency
Benton	Oxford	31.822	51.213	SR 352 east	Eastern end of SR 352 concurrency
Benton	Fowler	34.787	55.984	US 52 east – Lafayette, Indianapolis	eastern end of US 52 concurrency
Benton	Fowler	39.126	62.967	SR 18 east – Delphi	Eastern terminus of SR 18 concurrency
Benton	Fowler	40.346	64.931	US 52 west / SR 18 west	Western end of US 52 and SR 18 concurrences
Newton	Goodland	50.594	81.423	US 24 west – Kentland	Western end of US 24 concurrency
Newton	Goodland	51.092	82.225	US 24 east – Monticello	Eastern end of US 24 concurrency
Newton	Iroquois Township	58.496	94.140	SR 16	
Newton	Jackson Township	64.242	103.387	SR 114	
Newton	Colfax Township	71.238	114.646	SR 14	
Newton	Lincoln Township	80.310	129.246	SR 10	
Lake	Cedar Creek Township	90.864	146.231	SR 2 east to I-65 – Hebron	Eastern end of SR 2 concurrency
Lake	Cedar Creek Township	91.370	147.046	SR 2 west – Lowell	Western end of SR 2 concurrency
Lake	Crown Point	100.021	160.968	US 231 south – Hebron	Eastern end of US 231 concurrency
Lake	Crown Point	100.618	161.929	US 231 north – St. John	Western end of US 231 concurrency
Lake	Merrillville	104.581	168.307	US 30 / Lincoln Highway – Dyer, Valparaiso	
Lake	Gary	109.682	176.516	Ridge Road	Northern terminus of SR 55
1.000 mi = 1.609 km; 1.000 km = 0.621 mi: Concurrency terminus
