= Riverside, Fountain County, Indiana =

Riverside, Indiana
- Unincorporated community
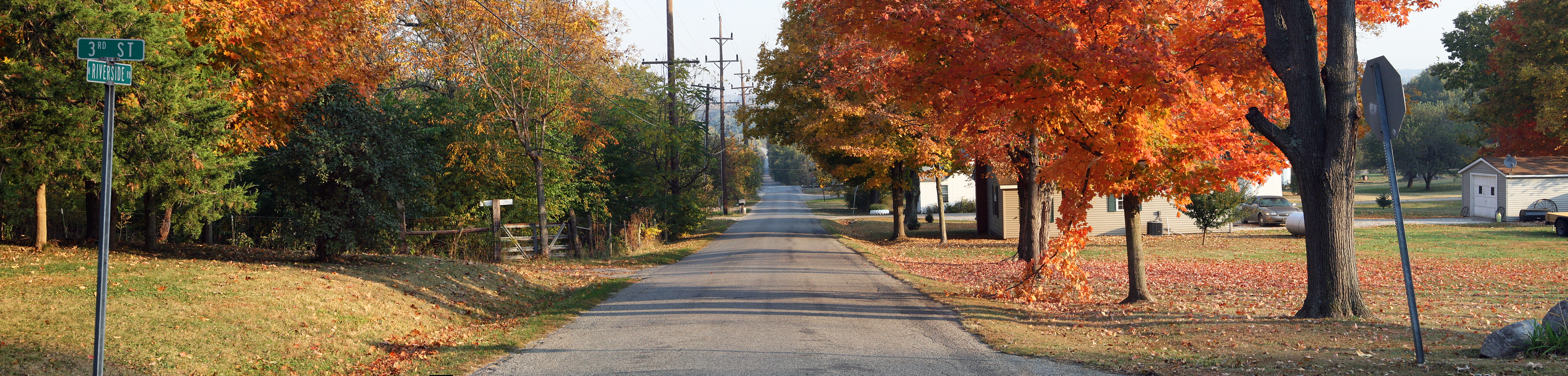
- Looking north through town along Riverside Road

- Fountain County's location in Indiana

- Riverside's location in Fountain County
- Coordinates: 40°19′30″N 87°09′58″W
- Country: United States
- State: Indiana
- County: Fountain
- Township: Davis
- Elevation: 568 ft (173 m)
- ZIP code: 47918
- FIPS code: 18-64836
- GNIS feature ID: 442081

Riverside is a small unincorporated community on the border of Davis Township and Logan Township in Fountain County, Indiana, United States.

== History ==
Riverside was originally called Fountain City, and under the latter name was established in the 1850s when the Wabash Railroad was extended to that point. The post office was established as Riverside in 1872, and remained in operation until it was discontinued in 1946.

== Geography ==
Riverside is located a little more than half a mile south of the Wabash River. Independence Station is in Riverside and dates from the time the Wabash Railroad was built to this point in 1854. The larger town of Independence is opposite Riverside on the north bank of the Wabash.

== Gallery ==
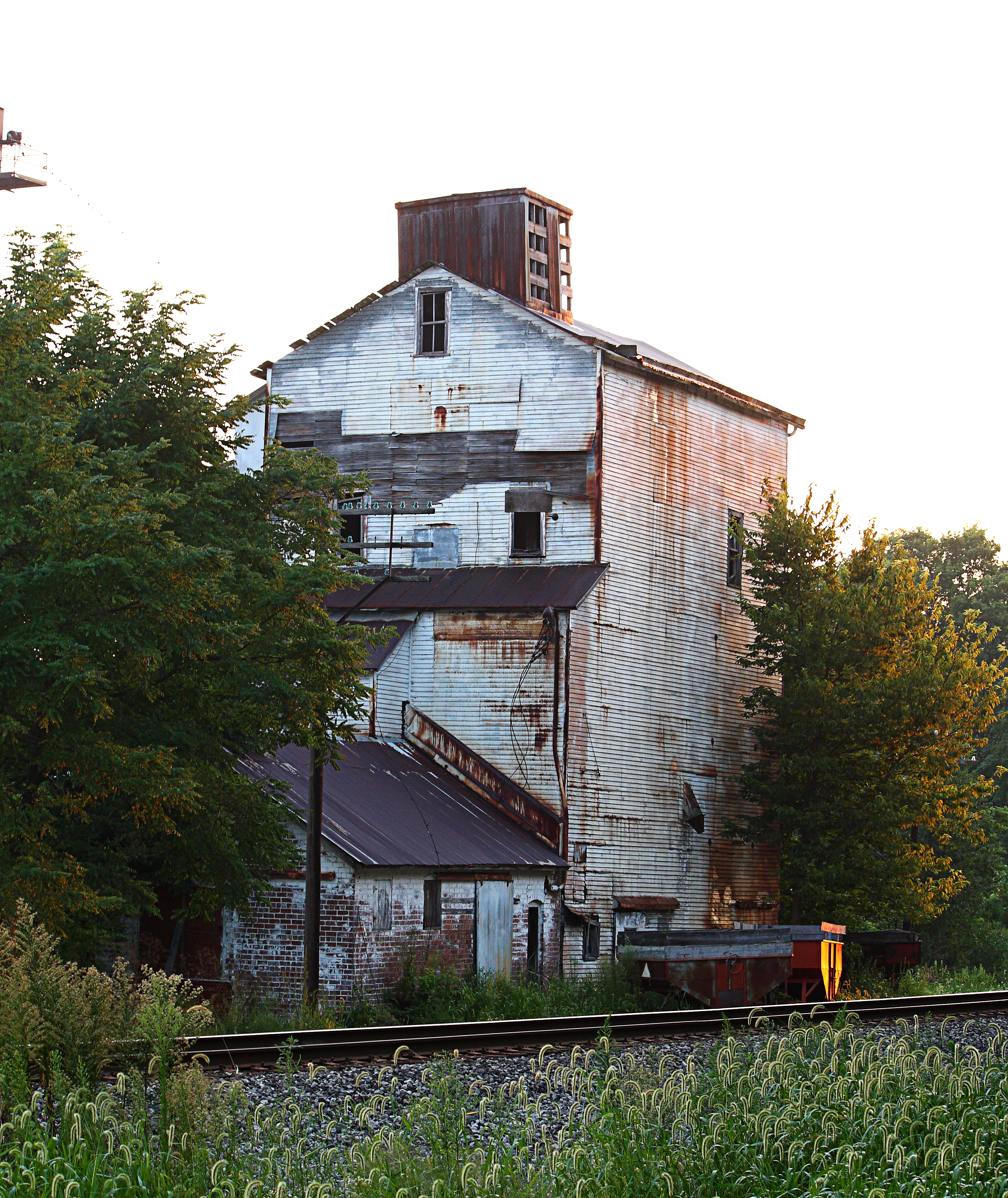
The grain elevator.

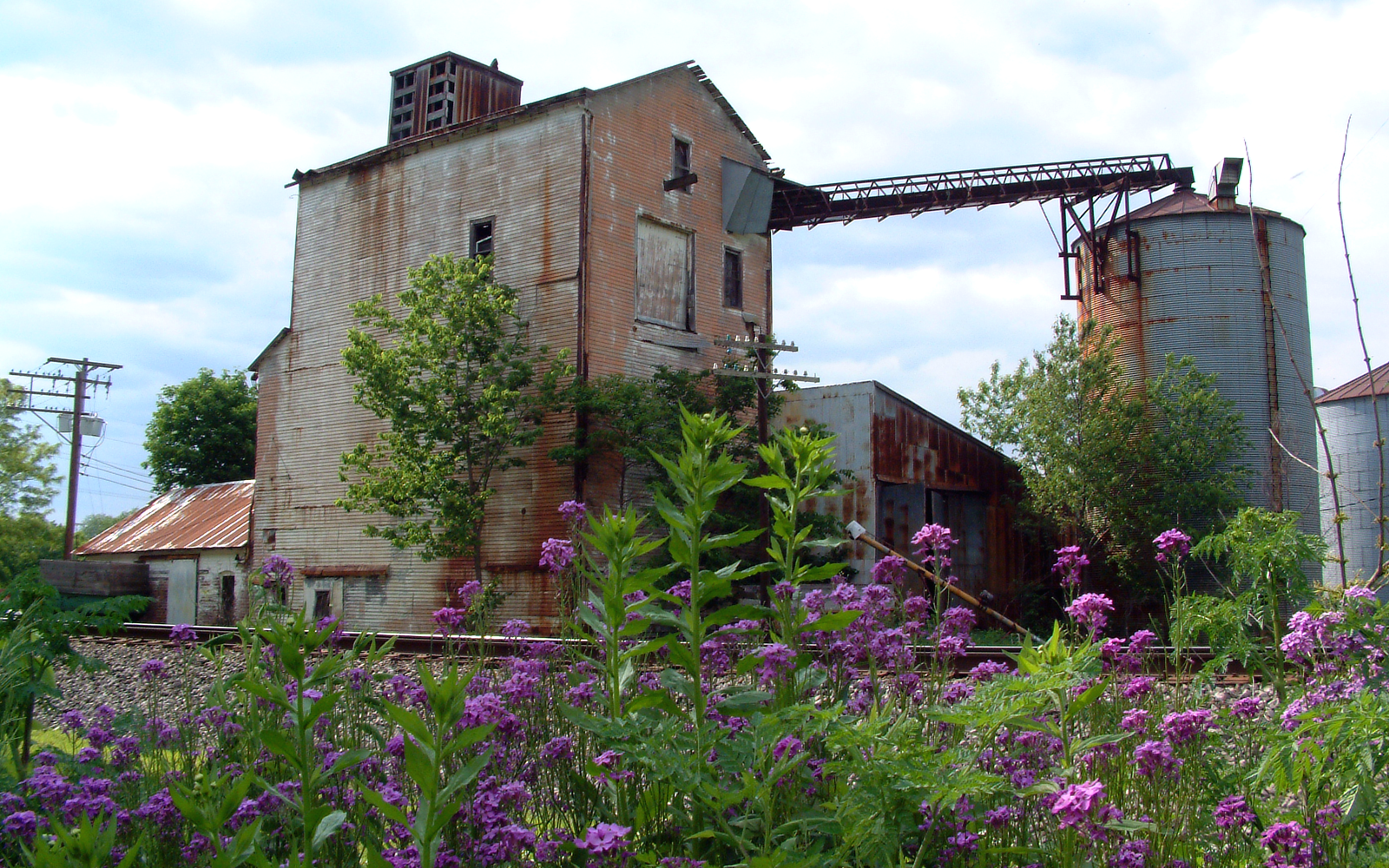
Sweet Rockets bloom near the grain elevator.

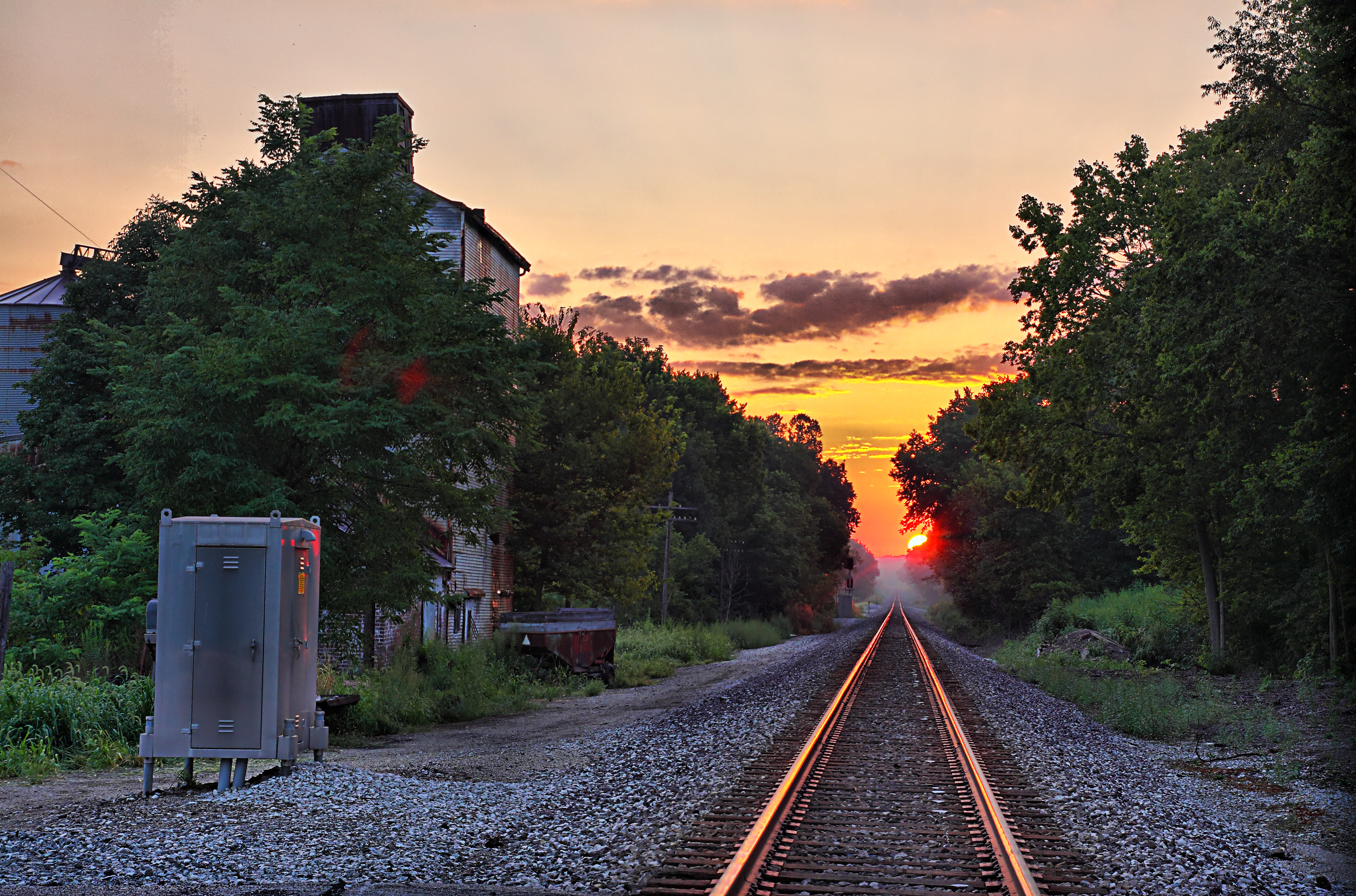
The railroad crossing.
