= Indiana State Road 341 =

State highway in Indiana, United States

State Road 341
- SR 341 highlighted in red

Route information
- Maintained by INDOT
- Length: 22.744 mi (36.603 km)

Major junctions
- South end: SR 234 south of Wallace
- US 136 in Hillsboro
- North end: SR 28 east of Attica

Location
- Country: United States
- State: Indiana
- Counties: Fountain

Highway system
- Indiana State Highway System; Interstate; US; State; Scenic
← SR 340	→ SR 350

State Road 341 in the U.S. state of Indiana is a north–south state highway in Fountain County in the west-central part of the state.

== Route description ==
The road starts near the south edge of the county at State Road 234 just over a mile south of Wallace. It passes north through the town of Hillsboro, where it is concurrent with Main Street and U.S. Route 136, then crosses Interstate 74 just north of Hillsboro and continues through the towns of Mellott and Newtown, and terminates at State Road 28 east of Attica.

== Major intersections ==
The entire route is in Fountain County.

Location	mi	km	Destinations	Notes
Jackson Township	0.000	0.000	SR 234 – Kingman, Jamestown	Southern terminus of SR 341
Jackson Township	5.313	8.550	SR 32 east – Crawfordsville	Southern end of SR 32 concurrency
Jackson Township	5.413	8.711	SR 32 west – Perrysville	Northern end of SR 32 concurrency
Hillsboro	10.175	16.375	US 136 west – Veedersburg	Western end of US 136 concurrency
Hillsboro	10.789	17.363	US 136 east – Waynetown, Crawfordsville	Eastern end of US 136 concurrency
Newtown	17.503	28.168	SR 55 – Wingate, Attica	
Davis Township	22.744	36.603	SR 28 – Attica, Frankfort	Northern terminus of SR 341
1.000 mi = 1.609 km; 1.000 km = 0.621 mi: Concurrency terminus
