= Zachariah Cicott =

Zachariah (Zacharie) Cicott (Cicotte, or Sicotte as it is usually written today) (1781–1850) was a French-Canadian trader and is believed to have been the first white settler to live permanently in what became Warren County, Indiana. He was the great-great-grandson of Jean Baptiste I Chiquot (or Cicot, Sicotte/Cicotte), who was born in France and immigrated to New France in 1662.

He was the third child of twelve born to Jean Baptiste Cicotte and Angelica Poupard. His birthdate is disputed, ranging from 1775 to 1781. Brothers and sisters include older sisters Angelique and Agathe and younger siblings Joseph, Theresa, John Baptiste, James, Francis Assisi, Francois Xavier, Louis, Marianna and George. His grandfather, Zacharie, was an only child. His great-grandfather was Jean Baptiste II Sicotte, the only son of the original Sicotte/Cicotte to come to North America.

Around 1802, Cicott arrived in the area to trade with the local Indians up and down the Wabash River. He was successful and became wealthy. He married a Potawotomie woman and they had two children, John Battiece and Sophia.

Shortly before the War of 1812, General William Henry Harrison at Vincennes directed Cicott to join him there to act as an army scout since he was very familiar with the area. He left Warren County immediately and went down the river, returning later with the army and passing back through Warren County to reach Tippecanoe County where the Battle of Tippecanoe took place on November 7, 1811.

Around 1816, after the war was over, Cicott resumed his trading on the Wabash. In 1817 he built a log house which became a rendezvous for travelers and settlers, and in 1832 he platted the town of Independence, Indiana and lived there until his death in 1850; he was buried in the town cemetery. For some years before his death he was partially paralyzed, probably from a stroke, and had difficulty speaking. As of 1883 the log house still stood, though it was badly deteriorated. Cicott Park, located at Independence, was established in 1993 and contains the site of his home and trading post.

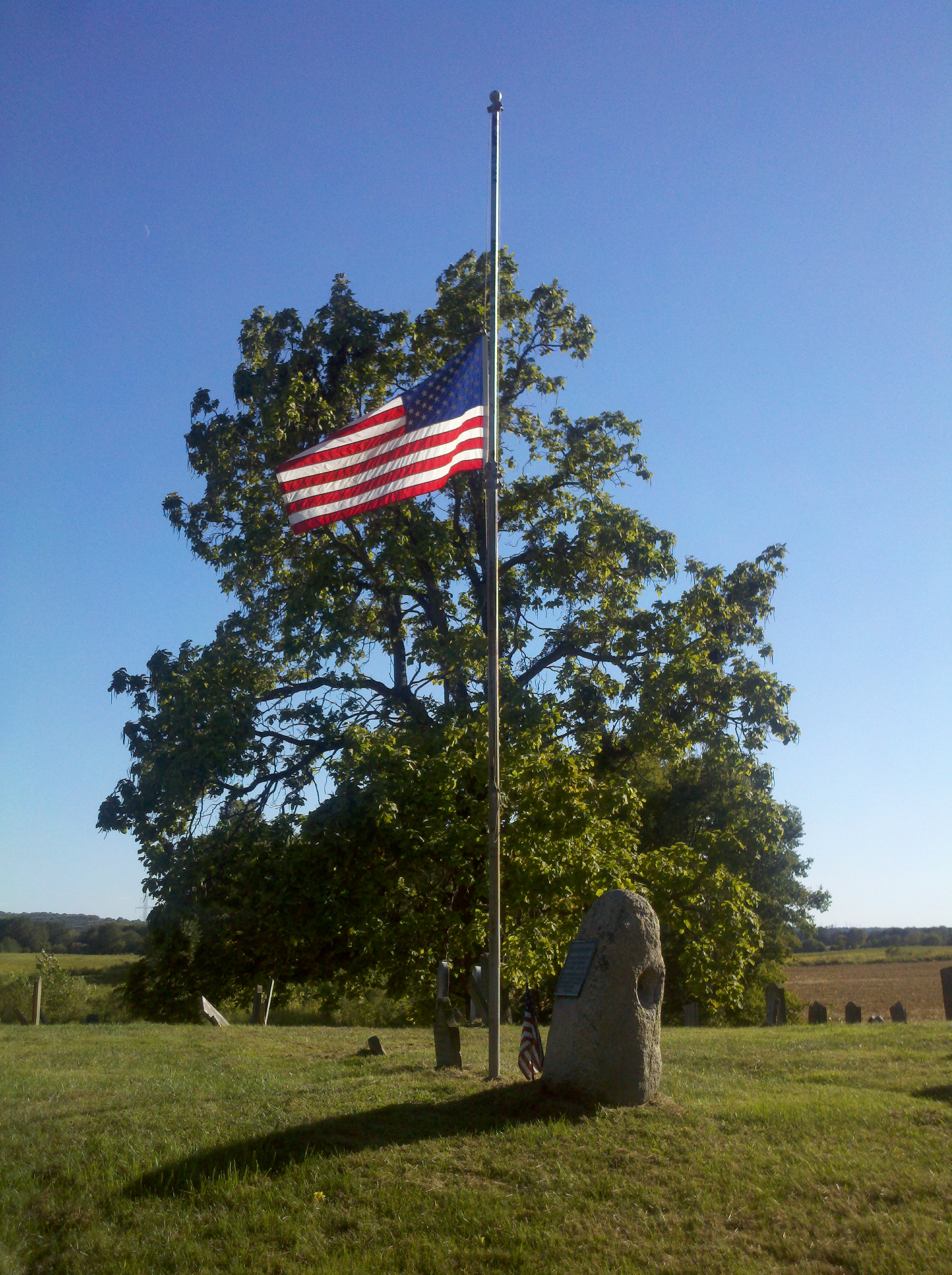
The marker for Cicott's grave

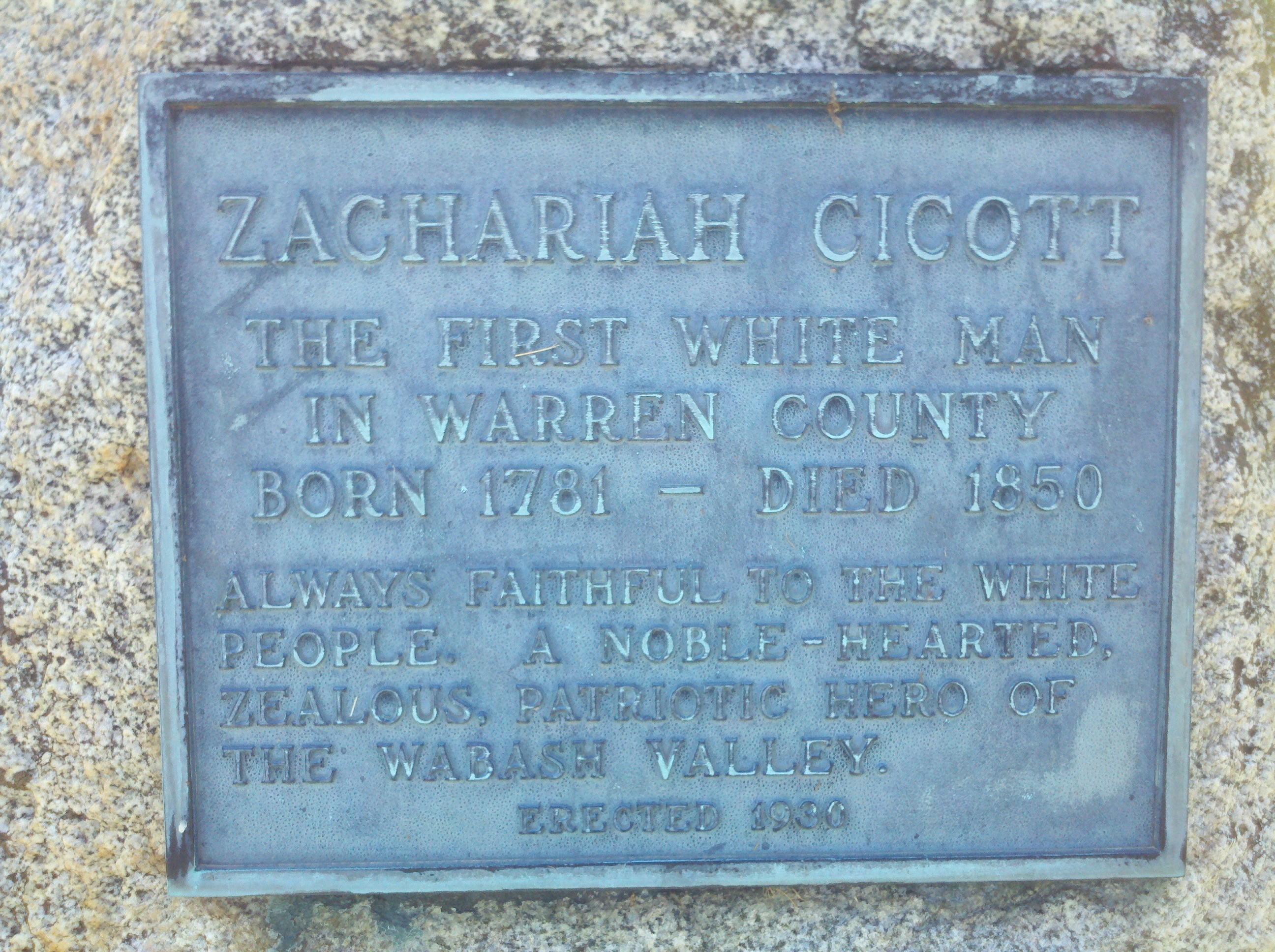
A close-up view of the marker

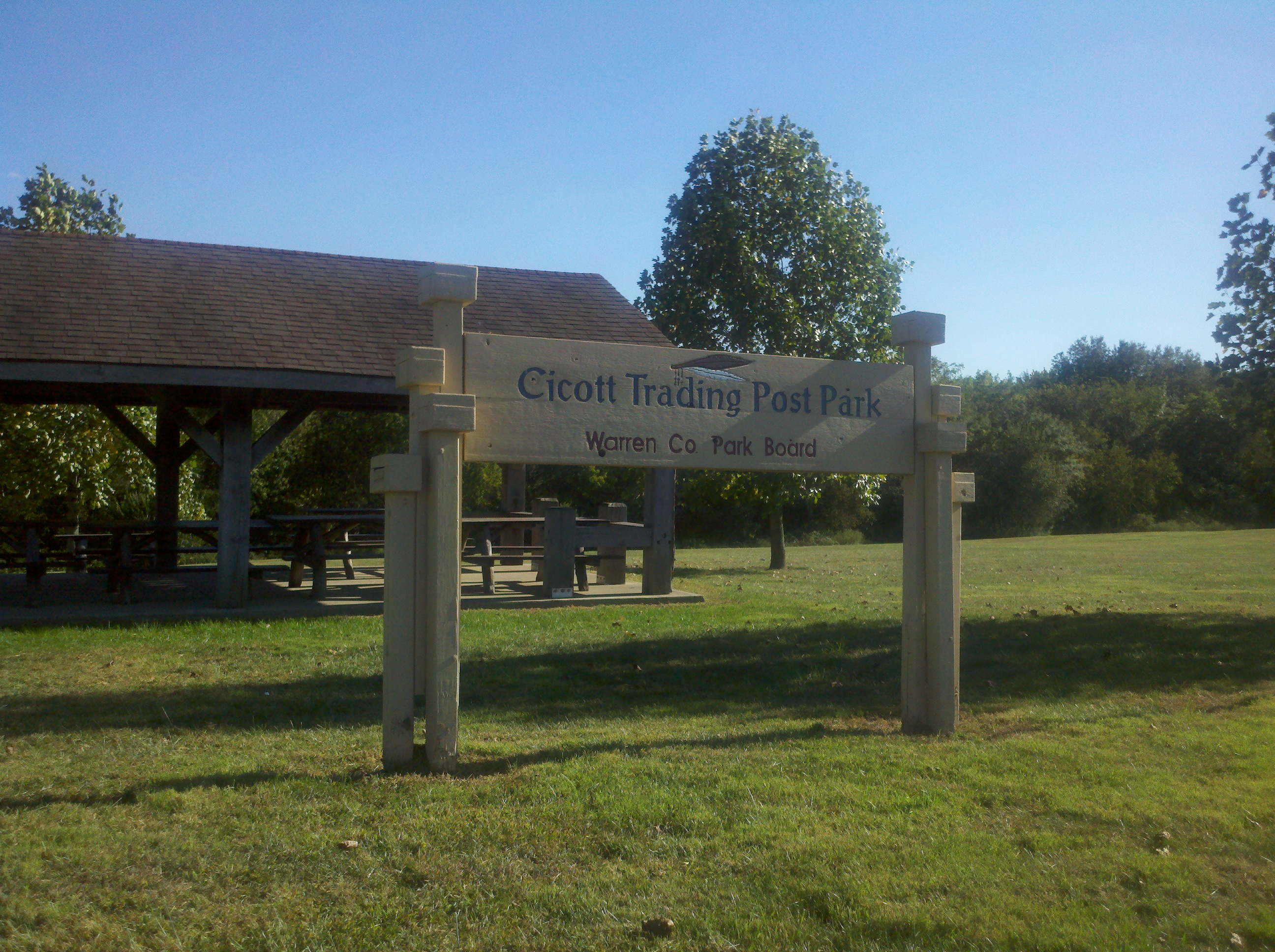
Entrance sign at Cicott Park
