= Jackson Township, Fountain County, Indiana =

Jackson Township
- Township
- Location of Jackson Township in Fountain County
- Coordinates: 39°59′46″N 87°08′51″W
- Country: United States
- State: Indiana
- County: Fountain

Government
  - Type: Indiana township

Area
  - Total: 36.08 sq mi (93.4 km^{2})
  - Land: 35.98 sq mi (93.2 km^{2})
  - Water: 0.09 sq mi (0.23 km^{2})
- Elevation: 719 ft (219 m)

Population (2020)
  - Total: 588
  - Density: 16.3/sq mi (6.31/km^{2})
- FIPS code: 18-37008
- GNIS feature ID: 453444

Jackson Township is one of eleven townships in Fountain County, Indiana, United States. As of the 2020 census, its population was 588 and it contained 308 housing units.

Historical population
Census	Pop.	Note	%±
1890	1,407		—
1900	1,322		−6.0%
1910	1,139		−13.8%
1920	1,050		−7.8%
1930	845		−19.5%
1940	892		5.6%
1950	760		−14.8%
1960	760		0.0%
1970	730		−3.9%
1980	662		−9.3%
1990	635		−4.1%
2000	718		13.1%
2010	628		−12.5%
2020	588		−6.4%
Source: US Decennial Census

== Geography ==
According to the 2010 census, the township has a total area of 36.08 square miles (93.4 km^{2}), of which 35.98 square miles (93.2 km^{2}) (or 99.72%) is land and 0.09 square miles (0.23 km^{2}) (or 0.25%) is water. It contains the town of Wallace, located near the center of the township, and the unincorporated community of Wooley Corner to the northwest of Wallace.

Indiana State Road 32 runs along a portion of the northern border before veering east-southeast through the northeastern part of the township. Indiana State Road 234 runs from east to west through the southern part of the township. Indiana State Road 341 begins at State Road 234 and runs north through Wallace before leaving the township.
