= Deerfield, Indiana =

- Unincorporated community
- Location within Indiana Location within the United States
- Coordinates: 40°16′43″N 84°58′35″W
- Country: United States
- State: Indiana
- County: Randolph
- Township: Ward
- Elevation: 991 ft (302 m)
- Time zone: UTC-5 (Eastern (EST))
  - Summer (DST): UTC-4 (EDT)
- ZIP code: 47380
- Area code: 765
- FIPS code: 18-17308
- GNIS feature ID: 433436

Deerfield is an unincorporated community in Ward Township, Randolph County, in the U.S. state of Indiana.

== History ==
Deerfield was platted in 1833. An old variant name of the community was called Mississinewa.
