= Independence, Indiana =

Census-designated place in Warren County, Indiana, United States

- Census-designated place
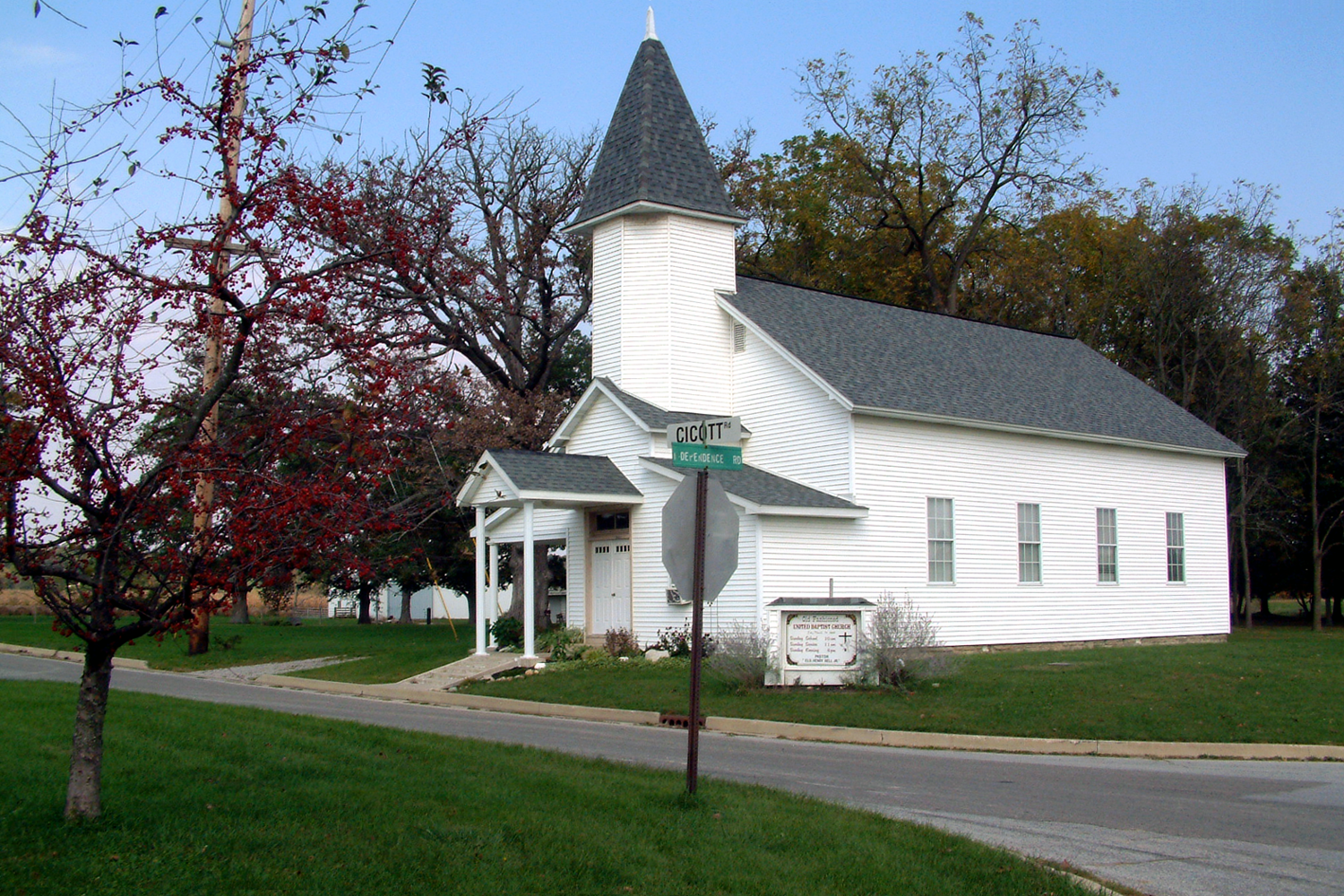
- The intersection of Independence and Cicott Roads

- Location within Warren County, Indiana Location within Indiana Location within the United States
- Coordinates: 40°20′16″N 87°10′18″W
- Country: United States
- State: Indiana
- County: Warren
- Township: Warren
- Founded: 1832
- Founded by: Zachariah Cicott

Area
  - Total: 0.21 sq mi (0.54 km^{2})
  - Land: 0.19 sq mi (0.49 km^{2})
  - Water: 0.019 sq mi (0.05 km^{2})
- Elevation: 558 ft (170 m)

Population (2020)
  - Total: 79
  - Density: 418.7/sq mi (161.66/km^{2})
- Time zone: UTC-5 (Eastern (EST))
  - Summer (DST): UTC-4 (EDT)
- ZIP code: 47993
- Area code: 765
- GNIS feature ID: 2806502

Independence is a census-designated place in Warren Township, Warren County, Indiana, United States. As of the 2020 census, Independence had a population of 79.

== History ==
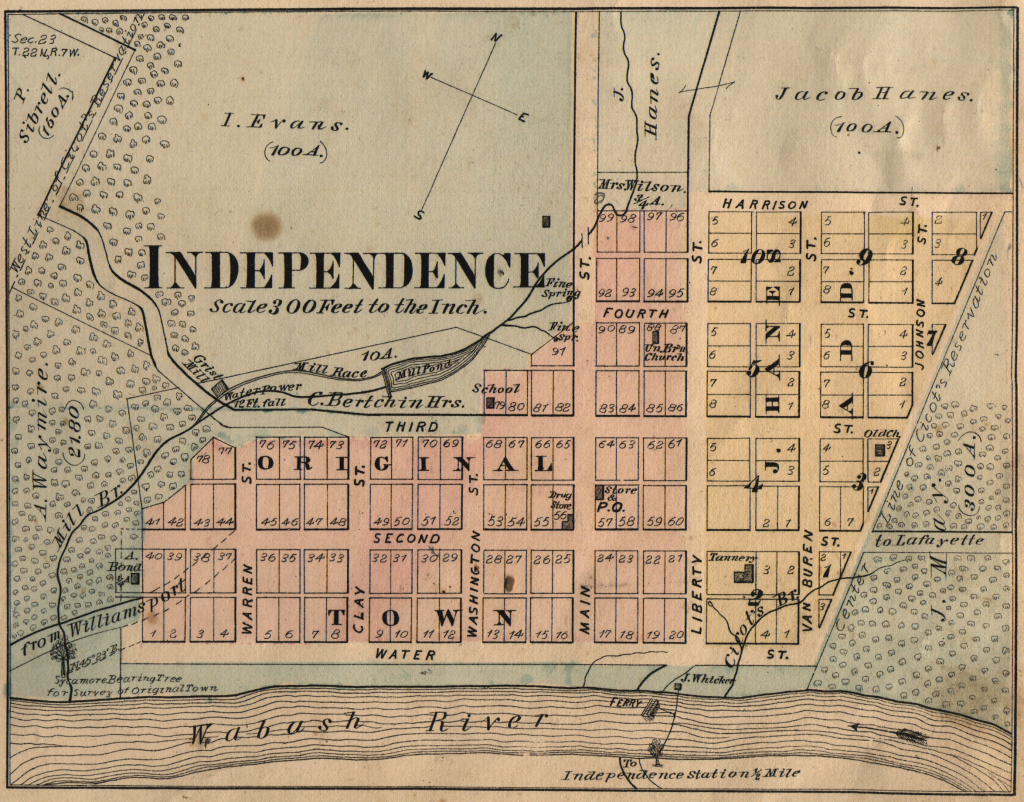
Map from 1877 atlas

A trading post existed at this location as early as 1811. The village was laid out on October 5, 1832, by Zachariah Cicott, a French-Indian trader and scout for General William Henry Harrison, on Cicott's Reserve, ground that was given to him by the government for his services. A post office was established on March 24, 1834, and closed on January 31, 1950. Now the town uses the post office in nearby Attica, despite the fact that Attica is in a different county.

The first newspaper in the county was produced in Independence, starting in 1844. It was called the Wabash Register and was run by Enos Canutt.

== Geography ==
Independence is located in the eastern part of the county on the western banks of the Wabash River, about 7 miles (11 km) northeast and upstream of the county seat of Williamsport. The small town of Riverside occupies the opposite bank, which is in Fountain County.

== Demographics ==
Historical population
Census	Pop.	Note	%±
2020	79		—
U.S. Decennial Census

== Education ==
It is in the Metropolitan School District of Warren County.

== See also ==
- List of census-designated places in Indiana
