= Foster, Indiana =

- Unincorporated community and Census-designated place
- Location within Warren County, Indiana Location within Indiana Location within the United States
- Coordinates: 40°08′30″N 87°28′07″W
- Country: United States
- State: Indiana
- County: Warren
- Township: Mound
- Founded: 1893
- Named after: William R. Foster

Area
  - Total: 1.29 sq mi (3.33 km^{2})
  - Land: 1.29 sq mi (3.33 km^{2})
  - Water: 0 sq mi (0.00 km^{2})
- Elevation: 630 ft (190 m)

Population (2020)
  - Total: 104
  - Density: 80.9/sq mi (31.24/km^{2})
- Time zone: UTC-5 (Eastern (EST))
  - Summer (DST): UTC-4 (EDT)
- ZIP code: 47993
- Area code: 765
- GNIS feature ID: 2806489

Foster is a small unincorporated community in Mound Township, Warren County, in the U.S. state of Indiana. As of the 2020 census, Foster had a population of 104.

== History ==
Foster was platted on April 25, 1893, on land donated by William R. Foster, an early settler. At one time the town had a post office, blacksmith shop, railroad depot, two stores, a stockyard, a threshing machine, a grain elevator and a sawmill. Currently it consists of a few private residences, a couple of small shops and a motel.

A post office was established at Foster in 1883, and remained in operation until it was discontinued in 1905.

== Geography ==
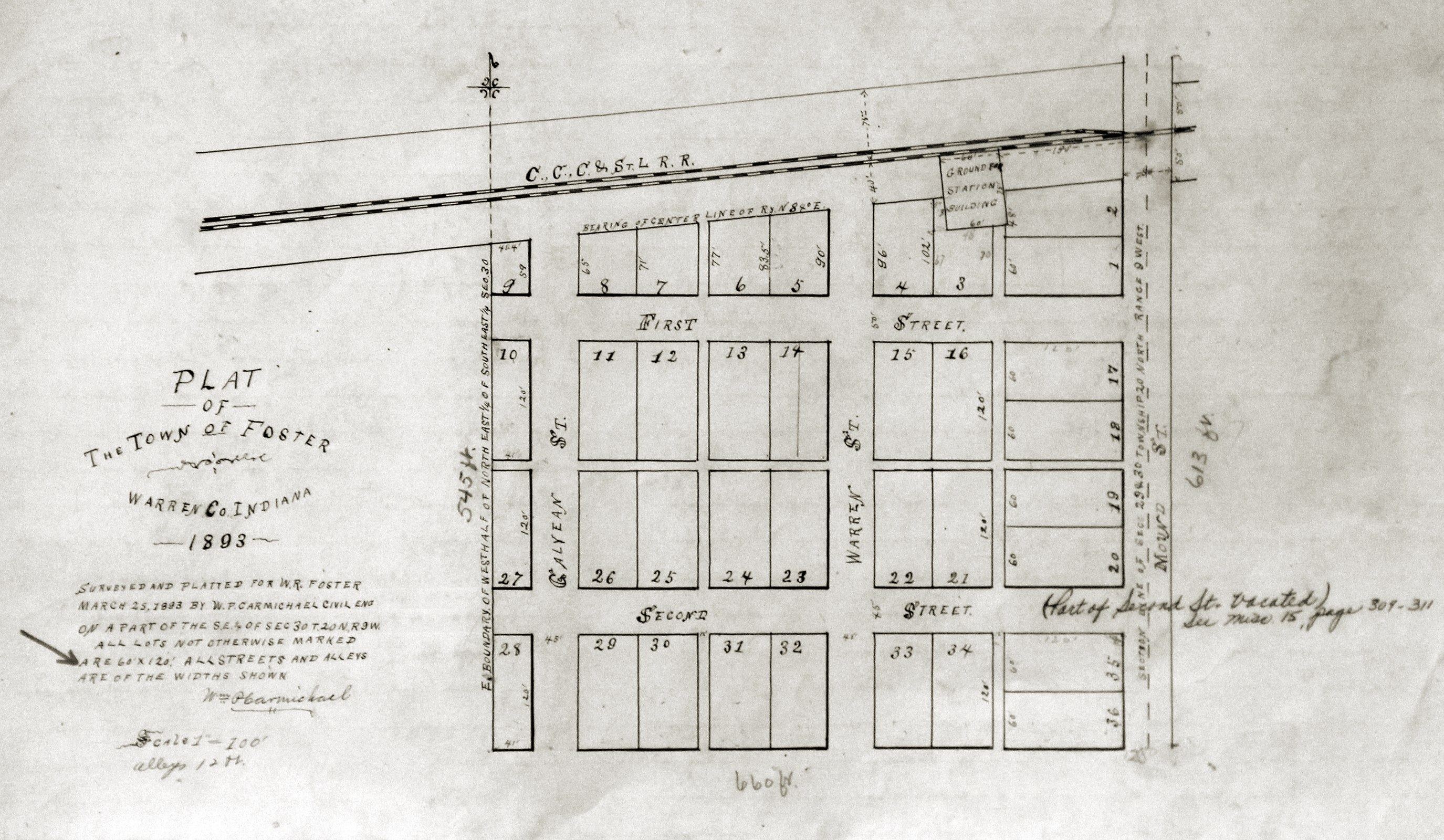
Foster's 1893 plat

Foster is located just north of U.S. Route 136 about 5 miles (8.0 km) west of Covington and about 3 miles (4.8 km) east of the Indiana-Illinois border. The Vermilion Valley Railroad (originally the New York Central Railroad) passes through Fowler, and the north fork of Spring Creek flows along its western edge.

== Demographics ==
Historical population
Census	Pop.	Note	%±
2020	104		—
U.S. Decennial Census

== Education ==
It is in the Covington Community School Corporation.
