= Saratoga, Indiana =

- Town
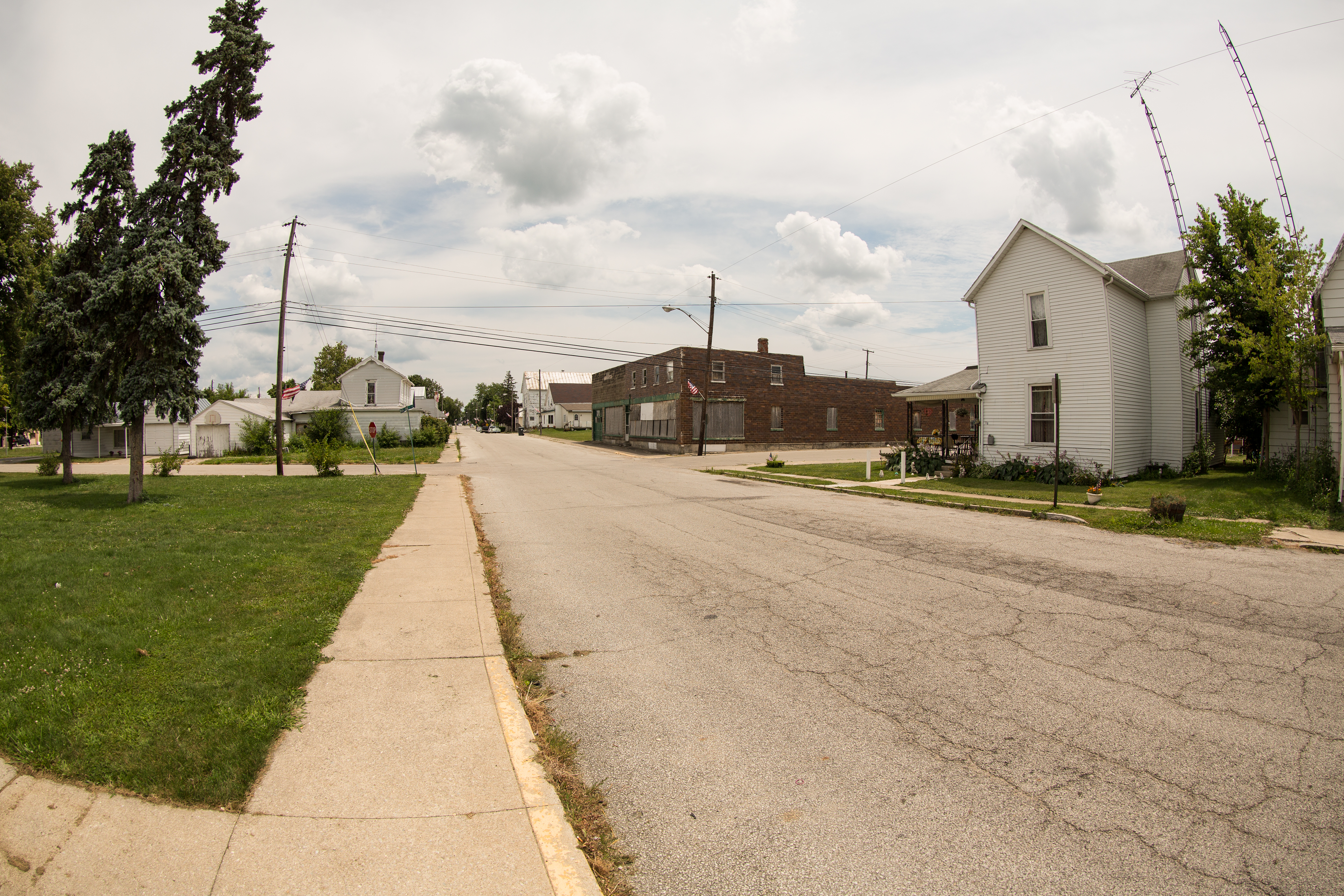

- Location of Saratoga in Randolph County, Indiana.
- Coordinates: 40°14′13″N 84°54′57″W
- Country: United States
- State: Indiana
- County: Randolph
- Township: Ward

Area
  - Total: 0.27 sq mi (0.69 km^{2})
  - Land: 0.27 sq mi (0.69 km^{2})
  - Water: 0 sq mi (0.00 km^{2})
- Elevation: 1,053 ft (321 m)

Population (2020)
  - Total: 231
  - Estimate (2025): 225 ▼
  - Density: 872.7/sq mi (336.94/km^{2})
- Time zone: UTC-5 (Eastern (EST))
  - Summer (DST): UTC-4 (EDT)
- ZIP code: 47382
- Area code: 765
- FIPS code: 18-68058
- GNIS feature ID: 2396906

Saratoga is a town in Ward Township, Randolph County, in the U.S. state of Indiana. The population was 231 at the 2020 census.

== History ==
A post office has been in operation at Saratoga since 1867. Saratoga was platted in 1875.

== Geography ==
According to the 2010 census, Saratoga has a total area of 0.26 square miles (0.67 km^{2}), all land.

== Demographics ==
Historical population
Census	Pop.	Note	%±
1880	136		—
1910	410		—
1920	327		−20.2%
1930	303		−7.3%
1940	349		15.2%
1950	333		−4.6%
1960	363		9.0%
1970	406		11.8%
1980	338		−16.7%
1990	266		−21.3%
2000	288		8.3%
2010	254		−11.8%
2020	231		−9.1%
2025 (est.)	225	▼	−2.6%
U.S. Decennial Census

=== 2010 census ===
As of the census of 2010, there were 254 people, 102 households, and 66 families living in the town. The population density was 940.7 inhabitants per square mile (363.2/km^{2}). There were 124 housing units at an average density of 459.3 per square mile (177.3/km^{2}). The racial makeup of the town was 98.8% White, 0.8% from other races, and 0.4% from two or more races. Hispanic or Latino of any race were 2.0% of the population.

There were 102 households, of which 37.3% had children under the age of 18 living with them, 51.0% were married couples living together, 8.8% had a female householder with no husband present, 4.9% had a male householder with no wife present, and 35.3% were non-families. 30.4% of all households were made up of individuals, and 15.7% had someone living alone who was 65 years of age or older. The average household size was 2.49 and the average family size was 3.14.

The median age in the town was 36.5 years. 28.7% of residents were under the age of 18; 11.1% were between the ages of 18 and 24; 24% were from 25 to 44; 21.6% were from 45 to 64; and 14.6% were 65 years of age or older. The gender makeup of the town was 45.7% male and 54.3% female.

=== 2000 census ===
As of the census of 2000, there were 288 people, 118 households, and 77 families living in the town. The population density was 1,090.9 inhabitants per square mile (421.2/km^{2}). There were 130 housing units at an average density of 492.4 per square mile (190.1/km^{2}). The racial makeup of the town was 98.26% White, 0.69% African American, 1.04% from other races. Hispanic or Latino of any race were 3.12% of the population.

There were 118 households, out of which 30.5% had children under the age of 18 living with them, 55.9% were married couples living together, 8.5% had a female householder with no husband present, and 33.9% were non-families. 29.7% of all households were made up of individuals, and 12.7% had someone living alone who was 65 years of age or older. The average household size was 2.44 and the average family size was 3.08.

In the town, the population was spread out, with 26.0% under the age of 18, 10.1% from 18 to 24, 26.0% from 25 to 44, 20.5% from 45 to 64, and 17.4% who were 65 years of age or older. The median age was 35 years. For every 100 females, there were 93.3 males. For every 100 females age 18 and over, there were 86.8 males.

The median income for a household in the town was $30,000, and the median income for a family was $39,688. Males had a median income of $29,167 versus $13,750 for females. The per capita income for the town was $14,669. About 5.3% of families and 6.9% of the population were below the poverty line, including 7.9% of those under the age of eighteen and 7.0% of those 65 or over.

== Education ==
Saratoga residents may obtain a free library card from the Winchester Community Public Library in Winchester.
