= Mellott, Indiana =

Mellott
- Town
- Location of Mellott in Fountain County, Indiana.

- Mellott's location in Fountain County
- Coordinates: 40°09′51″N 87°08′56″W
- Country: United States
- State: Indiana
- County: Fountain
- Township: Richland

Area
  - Total: 0.34 sq mi (0.89 km^{2})
  - Land: 0.34 sq mi (0.89 km^{2})
  - Water: 0 sq mi (0.00 km^{2})
- Elevation: 702 ft (214 m)

Population (2020)
  - Total: 174
  - Density: 508.5/sq mi (196.34/km^{2})
- Time zone: UTC-5 (Eastern (EST))
  - Summer (DST): UTC-4 (EDT)
- ZIP code: 47958
- Area code: 765
- FIPS code: 18-48294
- GNIS feature ID: 2396749

Mellott is a town in Richland Township, Fountain County, Indiana, United States. As of the 2020 census, Mellott had a population of 174.

== History ==
The Mellott post office was established in 1882. It was named in honor of John Mellott, the first postmaster.

== Geography ==
According to the 2010 census, Mellott has a total area of 0.17 square miles (0.44 km^{2}), all land.

== Demographics ==
Historical population
Census	Pop.	Note	%±
1910	372		—
1920	340		−8.6%
1930	312		−8.2%
1940	302		−3.2%
1950	266		−11.9%
1960	312		17.3%
1970	325		4.2%
1980	294		−9.5%
1990	222		−24.5%
2000	207		−6.8%
2010	197		−4.8%
2020	174		−11.7%
U.S. Decennial Census

=== 2010 census ===
As of the census of 2010, there were 197 people, 88 households, and 55 families living in the town. The population density was 1,158.8 inhabitants per square mile (447.4/km^{2}). There were 102 housing units at an average density of 600.0 per square mile (231.7/km^{2}). The racial makeup of the town was 99.0% White and 1.0% from two or more races. Hispanic or Latino of any race were 2.5% of the population.

There were 88 households, of which 27.3% had children under the age of 18 living with them, 45.5% were married couples living together, 14.8% had a female householder with no husband present, 2.3% had a male householder with no wife present, and 37.5% were non-families. 34.1% of all households were made up of individuals, and 19.3% had someone living alone who was 65 years of age or older. The average household size was 2.24 and the average family size was 2.85.

The median age in the town was 42.8 years. 22.8% of residents were under the age of 18; 7.7% were between the ages of 18 and 24; 21.4% were from 25 to 44; 23.9% were from 45 to 64; and 24.4% were 65 years of age or older. The gender makeup of the town was 45.7% male and 54.3% female.

=== 2000 census ===
As of the census of 2000, there were 207 people, 87 households, and 60 families living in the town. The population density was 1,317.8 inhabitants per square mile (508.8/km^{2}). There were 94 housing units at an average density of 598.4 per square mile (231.0/km^{2}). The racial makeup of the town was 99.52% White and 0.48% Native American. Hispanic or Latino of any race were 1.45% of the population.

There were 87 households, out of which 29.9% had children under the age of 18 living with them, 50.6% were married couples living together, 10.3% had a female householder with no husband present, and 29.9% were non-families. 29.9% of all households were made up of individuals, and 19.5% had someone living alone who was 65 years of age or older. The average household size was 2.38 and the average family size was 2.89.

In the town, the population was spread out, with 28.0% under the age of 18, 3.4% from 18 to 24, 29.5% from 25 to 44, 19.8% from 45 to 64, and 19.3% who were 65 years of age or older. The median age was 37 years. For every 100 females, there were 89.9 males. For every 100 females age 18 and over, there were 77.4 males.

The median income for a household in the town was $29,375, and the median income for a family was $37,500. Males had a median income of $33,750 versus $25,000 for females. The per capita income for the town was $19,694. About 5.9% of families and 11.1% of the population were below the poverty line, including 21.9% of those under the age of eighteen and 15.2% of those 65 or over.

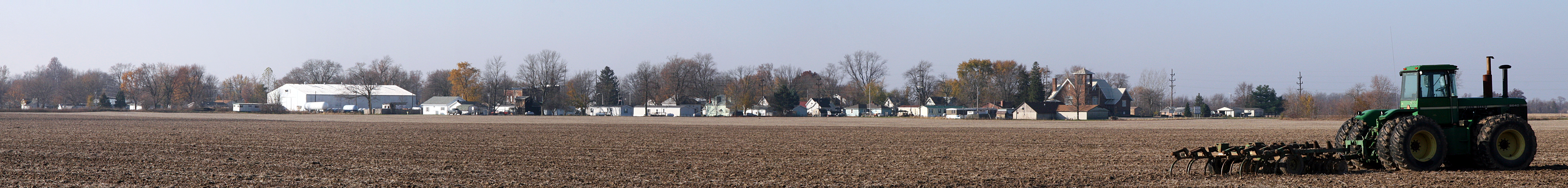
Mellott seen from the northeast along CR 300 North
