= Mound Township, Warren County, Indiana =

Mound Township
- Township
- Location of Mound Township in Warren County

- Location of Indiana in the United States
- Coordinates: 40°08′52″N 87°28′12″W
- Country: United States
- State: Indiana
- County: Warren

Government
  - Type: Indiana township

Area
  - Total: 16.79 sq mi (43.5 km^{2})
  - Land: 16.57 sq mi (42.9 km^{2})
  - Water: 0.22 sq mi (0.57 km^{2}) 1.31%
- Elevation: 640 ft (195 m)

Population (2020)
  - Total: 407
  - Density: 24.6/sq mi (9.48/km^{2})
- Time zone: UTC-5 (Eastern (EST))
  - Summer (DST): UTC-4 (EDT)
- Area code: 765
- GNIS feature ID: 453656

Mound Township is one of twelve townships in Warren County, Indiana, United States. According to the 2020 census, its population was 407 and it contained 199 housing units.

Historical population
Census	Pop.	Note	%±
1890	515		—
1900	509		−1.2%
1910	456		−10.4%
1920	356		−21.9%
1930	370		3.9%
1940	347		−6.2%
1950	317		−8.6%
1960	350		10.4%
1970	404		15.4%
1980	483		19.6%
1990	448		−7.2%
2000	438		−2.2%
2010	418		−4.6%
2020	407		−2.6%
Source: US Decennial Census

== History ==
Mound Township was one of the original four created when the county was organized in 1827.

== Geography ==
According to the 2010 census, the township has a total area of 16.79 square miles (43.5 km^{2}), of which 16.57 square miles (42.9 km^{2}) (or 98.69%) is land and 0.22 square miles (0.57 km^{2}) (or 1.31%) is water. The town of Foster is located just north of U.S. Route 136, about 1 mile (1.6 km) east of the township's southwestern border. Extinct communities in the township include Baltimore, which thrived on the banks of the Wabash River in the early 19th century, and Romine Corner. The streams of Kitchen Creek and Possum Run run through the township.

Map of Mound Township

=== Cemeteries ===
The township contains these three cemeteries: Baltimore, Rodgers and Upper Mound.

=== Transportation ===
U.S. Route 136 runs across the south part of the township, connecting Danville, Illinois to the west with Covington to the east. Indiana State Road 63 runs from north to south in the eastern part of the township; its child route of Indiana State Road 263 joins State Road 63 just north of the intersection with U.S. Route 136. The 6-mile (10 km) Vermilion Valley Railroad serves the Flex-N-Gate factory near Covington and runs west from the plant through the town of Foster to meet a CSX line in Danville.

== Education ==
Mound Township is part of the Metropolitan School District of Warren County.

== Government ==
Mound Township has a trustee who administers rural fire protection and ambulance service, provides relief to the poor, manages cemetery care, and performs farm assessment, among other duties. The trustee is assisted in these duties by a three-member township board. The trustees and board members are elected to four-year terms.

Mound Township is part of Indiana's 8th congressional district, Indiana House of Representatives District 42, and Indiana State Senate District 38.
