= Ward Township, Randolph County, Indiana =

Ward Township
- Township
- Coordinates: 40°15′35″N 84°57′37″W
- Country: United States
- State: Indiana
- County: Randolph

Government
  - Type: Indiana township

Area
  - Total: 36.88 sq mi (95.5 km^{2})
  - Land: 36.75 sq mi (95.2 km^{2})
  - Water: 0.13 sq mi (0.34 km^{2})
- Elevation: 1,020 ft (311 m)

Population (2020)
  - Total: 1,059
  - Density: 28.82/sq mi (11.13/km^{2})
- Time zone: UTC-5 (Eastern (EST))
  - Summer (DST): UTC-4 (EDT)
- Area code: 765
- FIPS code: 18-80072
- GNIS feature ID: 453973

Ward Township is one of eleven townships in Randolph County, Indiana. As of the 2020 census, its population was 1,059 (down from 1,109 at 2010) and it contained 469 housing units.

== History ==
Ward Township was established in 1820.

== Geography ==
According to the 2010 census, the township has a total area of 36.88 square miles (95.5 km^{2}), of which 36.75 square miles (95.2 km^{2}) (or 99.65%) is land and 0.13 square miles (0.34 km^{2}) (or 0.35%) is water.

=== Cities and towns ===
- Saratoga

=== Unincorporated towns ===
- Deerfield at 40.2786554°N 84.9763560°W
- Randolph at 40.2661553°N 84.9758004°W
- Stone at 40.2367107°N 85.0044119°W

(This list is based on USGS data and may include former settlements.)

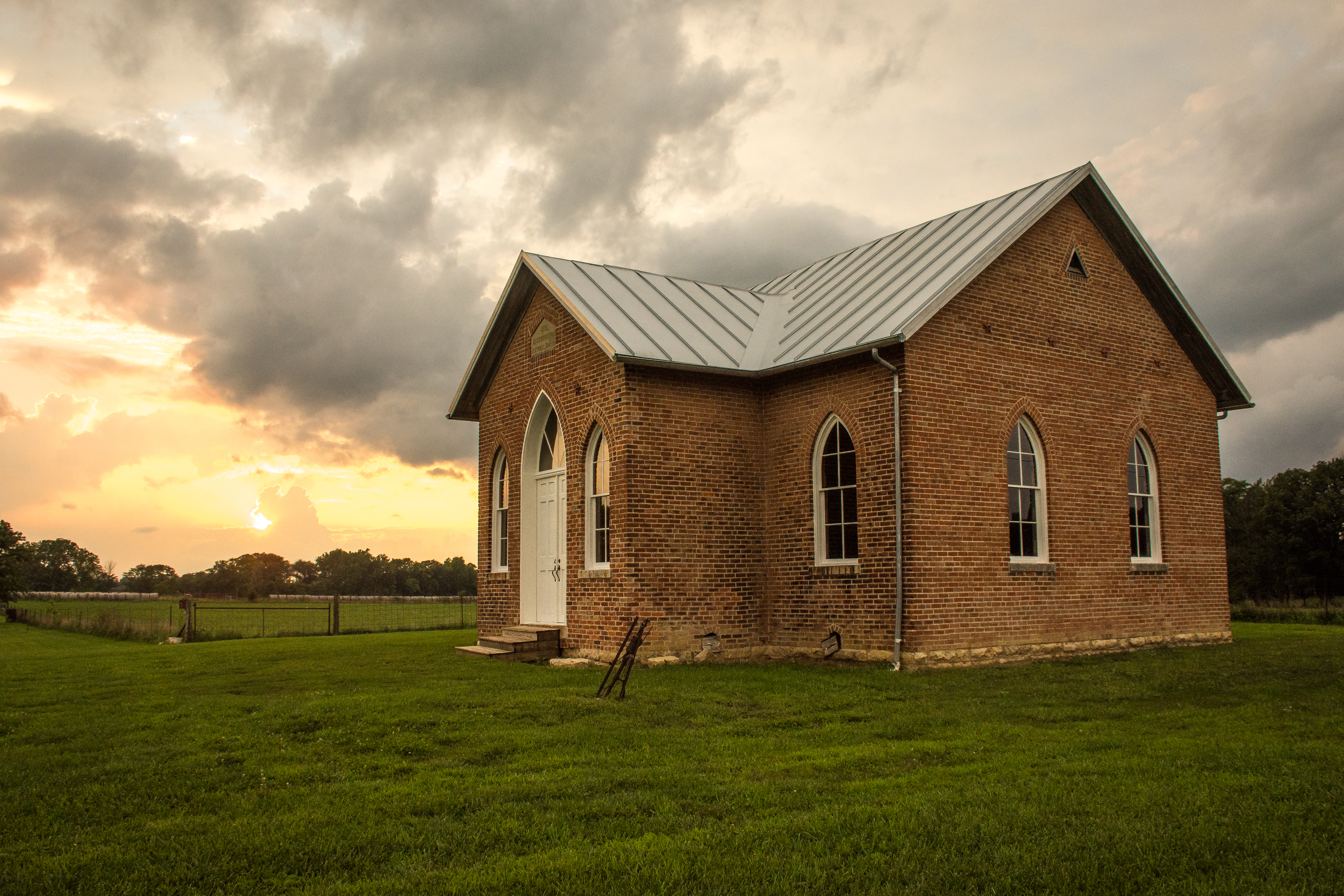
Ward Township District 5 School, closed 1913

== Education ==
Ward Township residents may obtain a free library card from the Winchester Community Public Library in Winchester.
