= Franklin Township, Randolph County, Indiana =

Franklin Township
- Township
- Coordinates: 40°15′53″N 85°03′21″W
- Country: United States
- State: Indiana
- County: Randolph

Government
  - Type: Indiana township

Area
  - Total: 24 sq mi (62 km^{2})
  - Land: 23.93 sq mi (62.0 km^{2})
  - Water: 0.07 sq mi (0.18 km^{2})
- Elevation: 978 ft (298 m)

Population (2020)
  - Total: 1,124
  - Density: 46.97/sq mi (18.14/km^{2})
- Time zone: UTC-5 (Eastern (EST))
  - Summer (DST): UTC-4 (EDT)
- Area code: 765
- FIPS code: 18-25594
- GNIS feature ID: 453313

Franklin Township is one of eleven townships in Randolph County, Indiana. As of the 2020 census, its population was 1,124 (down from 1,265 at 2010) and it contained 540 housing units.

== History ==
Franklin Township was established in 1859.

== Geography ==
According to the 2010 census, the township has a total area of 24 square miles (62 km^{2}), of which 23.93 square miles (62.0 km^{2}) (or 99.71%) is land and 0.07 square miles (0.18 km^{2}) (or 0.29%) is water.

=== Cities and towns ===
- Ridgeville
