= Newtown, Indiana =

Newtown
- Town
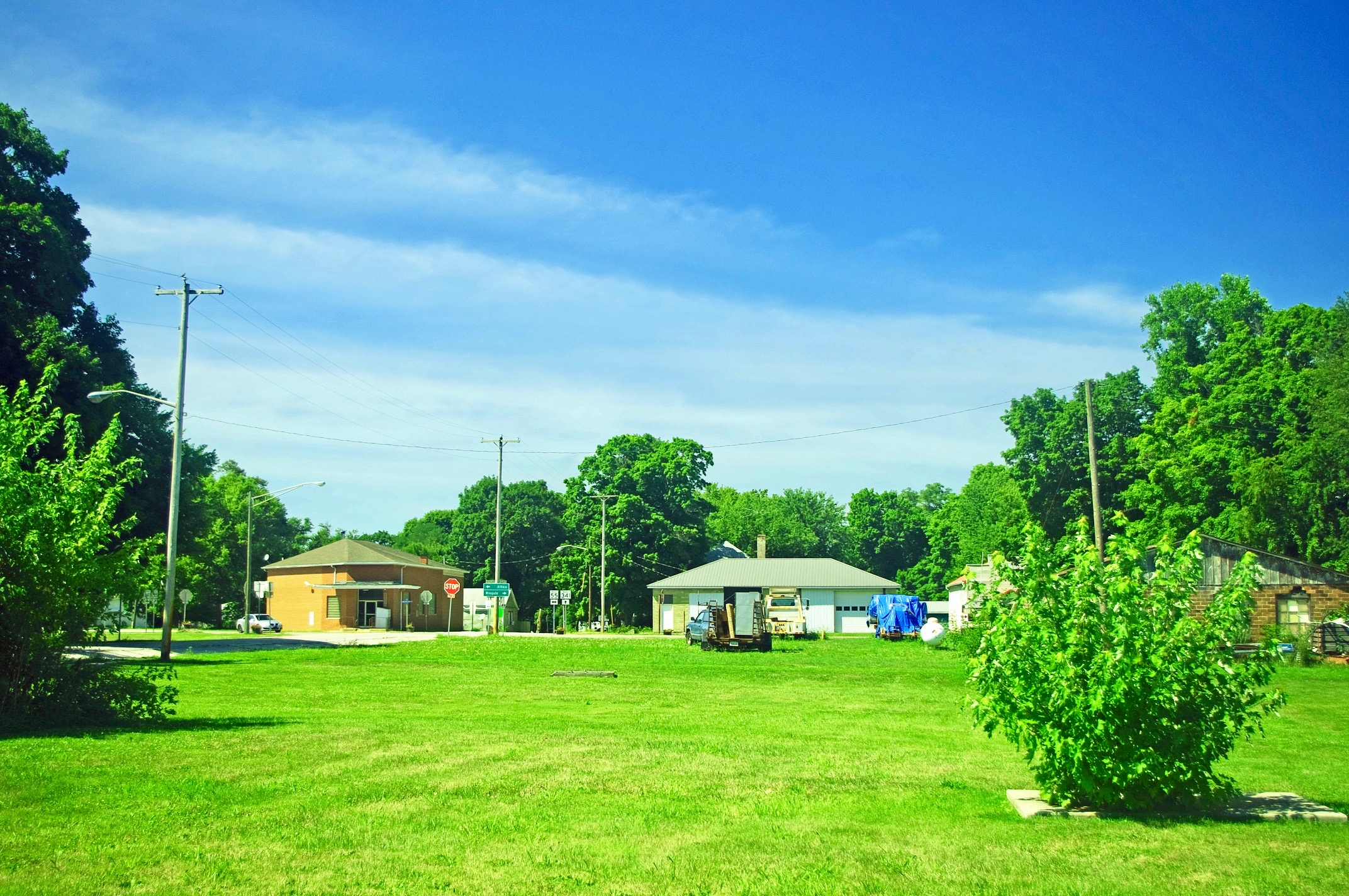
- Newtown

- Location of Newtown in Fountain County, Indiana.

- Newtown's location in Fountain County
- Coordinates: 40°12′16″N 87°08′54″W
- Country: United States
- State: Indiana
- County: Fountain
- Township: Richland

Area
  - Total: 0.51 sq mi (1.31 km^{2})
  - Land: 0.51 sq mi (1.31 km^{2})
  - Water: 0 sq mi (0.00 km^{2})
- Elevation: 705 ft (215 m)

Population (2020)
  - Total: 217
  - Density: 430.4/sq mi (166.17/km^{2})
- Time zone: UTC-5 (Eastern (EST))
  - Summer (DST): UTC-4 (EDT)
- ZIP code: 47969
- Area code: 765
- FIPS code: 18-53694
- GNIS feature ID: 2396815

Newtown is a town in Richland Township, Fountain County, Indiana, United States. As of the 2020 census, Newtown had a population of 217.

== History ==
Newtown was platted in 1829. The Newtown post office was established in 1831.

== Geography ==
Newtown is concentrated around the intersection of State Road 55 and State Road 341 northwest of Indianapolis.

According to the 2010 census, Newtown has a total area of 0.5 square miles (1.29 km^{2}), all land.

== Demographics ==
Historical population
Census	Pop.	Note	%±
1920	329		—
1930	264		−19.8%
1940	293		11.0%
1950	287		−2.0%
1960	321		11.8%
1970	286		−10.9%
1980	277		−3.1%
1990	243		−12.3%
2000	162		−33.3%
2010	256		58.0%
2020	217		−15.2%
U.S. Decennial Census

=== 2010 census ===
As of the census of 2010, there were 256 people, 93 households, and 67 families living in the town. The population density was 512.0 inhabitants per square mile (197.7/km^{2}). There were 107 housing units at an average density of 214.0 per square mile (82.6/km^{2}). The racial makeup of the town was 95.3% White, 2.0% African American, 0.8% Native American, and 2.0% from two or more races. Hispanic or Latino of any race were 1.6% of the population.

There were 93 households, of which 38.7% had children under the age of 18 living with them, 55.9% were married couples living together, 8.6% had a female householder with no husband present, 7.5% had a male householder with no wife present, and 28.0% were non-families. 23.7% of all households were made up of individuals, and 9.7% had someone living alone who was 65 years of age or older. The average household size was 2.75 and the average family size was 3.18.

The median age in the town was 35.4 years. 28.5% of residents were under the age of 18; 8.2% were between the ages of 18 and 24; 28.9% were from 25 to 44; 25.8% were from 45 to 64; and 8.6% were 65 years of age or older. The gender makeup of the town was 56.3% male and 43.8% female.

=== 2000 census ===
As of the census of 2000, there were 162 people, 61 households, and 42 families living in the town. The population density was 321.3 inhabitants per square mile (124.1/km^{2}). There were 72 housing units at an average density of 142.8 per square mile (55.1/km^{2}). The racial makeup of the town was 95.68% White, 1.85% Native American, and 2.47% from two or more races. Hispanic or Latino of any race were 3.09% of the population.

There were 61 households, out of which 32.8% had children under the age of 18 living with them, 62.3% were married couples living together, 4.9% had a female householder with no husband present, and 31.1% were non-families. 29.5% of all households were made up of individuals, and 14.8% had someone living alone who was 65 years of age or older. The average household size was 2.66 and the average family size was 3.29.

In the town, the population was spread out, with 30.2% under the age of 18, 6.2% from 18 to 24, 27.2% from 25 to 44, 22.2% from 45 to 64, and 14.2% who were 65 years of age or older. The median age was 36 years. For every 100 females, there were 116.0 males. For every 100 females age 18 and over, there were 109.3 males.

The median income for a household in the town was $41,250, and the median income for a family was $53,036. Males had a median income of $28,750 versus $21,875 for females. The per capita income for the town was $25,441. About 2.3% of families and 8.0% of the population were below the poverty line, including 23.3% of those under the age of eighteen and none of those 65 or over.

== Notable people ==
- Hiram Orlando Fairchild, Wisconsin lawyer and legislator
