= Wallace, Indiana =

Wallace
- Town
- Location of Wallace in Fountain County, Indiana.

- Wallace's location in Fountain County
- Coordinates: 39°59′14″N 87°08′50″W
- Country: United States
- State: Indiana
- County: Fountain
- Township: Jackson
- Named for: Governor David Wallace

Area
  - Total: 0.14 sq mi (0.37 km^{2})
  - Land: 0.14 sq mi (0.37 km^{2})
  - Water: 0 sq mi (0.00 km^{2})
- Elevation: 705 ft (215 m)

Population (2020)
  - Total: 79
  - Density: 553.4/sq mi (213.67/km^{2})
- Time zone: UTC-5 (Eastern (EST))
  - Summer (DST): UTC-4 (EDT)
- ZIP code: 47988
- Area code: 765
- FIPS code: 18-79730
- GNIS feature ID: 2397719

Wallace, originally named Jacksonville, is a town located in Jackson Township, Fountain County, Indiana, United States. As of the 2020 census, Wallace had a population of 79.

== History ==
Jacksonville, one of Fountain County's early settlements, was established by John Bowman and his father Henry in the early 1830s on land situated just north of Mill Creek and was named for Andrew Jackson. The town's name in informal speech was often shortened to "Jackville". The first settler at the site was Richard Williams who erected a cabin as early as 1826, several years before the town was laid out, with the first house erected after Jacksonville's platting belonging to William Guilliams. By the 1880s, it contained about two dozen houses.

Early tradesmen in Jacksonville included William Snooks, the township's first blacksmith, Samuel Glass who operated a house of entertainment, shoemaker Alvah Doke, cabinet-maker George McCline, physicians Dr. Reeves, Dr. A. M. C. Hawes and Dr. Joseph Roberts and various general storekeepers. An 1881 history offers the following description of the town's businesses:

In comparatively recent times Noah and Charles Grimes, Bayless and Jacob Carter, — Cunningham & Smith, and several others, had stores. The present dealers are John Murphy, David Oliver, and Johnson Clore. Henry Newlin is selling drugs. His predecessor in this business was W. H. Spinning. A blacksmith and a chair shop are in this place, and a house which welcomes the hungry traveler and jaded animal with entertainment is also to be found. Somebody with business sagacity keeps constantly on hand a stock of coffins as a sign that there are two doctors in the village.

The town gained a post office during the administration of Indiana Governor David Wallace, and was named by John Bowman and Judge Mitchell C. Black in the governor's honor. The town itself later assumed this name. Bowman was the office's first postmaster and Black the first mailcarrier.

In 1950, the list of merchants in Wallace included; Ira Wilkinson General Store, J. W. Grimes Grocery (which also housed the post office), Ralph Myers TV and Appliances, Carl Starnes Insurance, Uplinger Cafe, Paul Mitchell Barber Shop, McGinnis Garage, Clores Grocery and Lunch, Ellingwood's Lumber Yard, Alward's Skelgas Service and the office of H. M. Rusk physician. A blacksmith shop and food processing plant were also present. The Wallace School, grades 1 through 12, served all of Jackson Township. There were eight students in the high school graduating class of 1951.

== Geography ==
Wallace is located adjacent to Mill Creek, which flows from the northeast and borders the town to the east and south.

According to the 2010 census, Wallace has a total area of 0.09 square miles (0.23 km^{2}), all land.

== Demographics ==
Historical population
Census	Pop.	Note	%±
1910	116		—
1920	111		−4.3%
1930	128		15.3%
1940	123		−3.9%
1950	123		0.0%
1960	122		−0.8%
1970	136		11.5%
1980	88		−35.3%
1990	89		1.1%
2000	100		12.4%
2010	105		5.0%
2020	79		−24.8%
U.S. Decennial Census

Estimated median household income in 2007: $47,545. Estimated median house or condo value in 2007: $62,681. 2008 cost of living index in Wallace: 72.5 (low, U.S. average is 100)

=== 2010 census ===
At the census of 2010, there were 105 people, 52 households, and 28 families residing in the town. The population density was 1,166.7 inhabitants per square mile (450.5/km^{2}). There were 55 housing units at an average density of 611.1 per square mile (235.9/km^{2}). The racial makeup of the town was 100.0% White.

There were 52 households, of which 19.2% had children under the age of 18 living with them, 44.2% were married couples living together, 3.8% had a female householder with no husband present, 5.8% had a male householder with no wife present, and 46.2% were non-families. 42.3% of all households were made up of individuals, and 21.1% had someone living alone who was 65 years of age or older. The average household size was 2.02 and the average family size was 2.68.

The median age in the town was 45.5 years. 18.1% of residents were under the age of 18; 8.6% were between the ages of 18 and 24; 22.9% were from 25 to 44; 27.7% were from 45 to 64; and 22.9% were 65 years of age or older. The gender makeup of the town was 48.6% male and 51.4% female.

=== 2000 census ===
At the census of 2000, there were 100 people, 35 households, and 24 families residing in the town. The population density was 1,182.8 inhabitants per square mile (456.7/km^{2}). There were 40 housing units at an average density of 473.1 per square mile (182.7/km^{2}). The racial makeup of the town was 100.00% White, 0.00% African American, 0.00% Native American, 0.00% Asian, 0.00% Pacific Islander, 0.00% from other races, and 0.00% from two or more races. 0.00% of the population were Hispanic or Latino of any race.

There were 35 households, out of which 34.3% had children under the age of 18 living with them, 57.1% were married couples living together, 5.7% had a female householder with no husband present, and 31.4% were non-families. 28.6% of all households were made up of individuals, and 11.4% had someone living alone who was 65 years of age or older. The average household size was 2.86 and the average family size was 3.46.

In the town, the population was spread out, with 33.0% under the age of 18, 5.0% from 18 to 24, 29.0% from 25 to 44, 15.0% from 45 to 64, and 18.0% who were 65 years of age or older. The median age was 32 years. For every 100 females, there were 81.8 males. For every 100 females age 18 and over, there were 91.4 males.

The median income for a household in the town was $39,583, and the median income for a family was $31,875. Males had a median income of $25,938 versus $28,750 for females. The per capita income for the town was $10,386. 23.4% of the population and 18.5% of families were below the poverty line. Out of the total population, 29.7% of those under the age of 18 and 0.0% of those 65 and older were living below the poverty line.
