= Hillsboro, Indiana =

Hillsboro
- Town
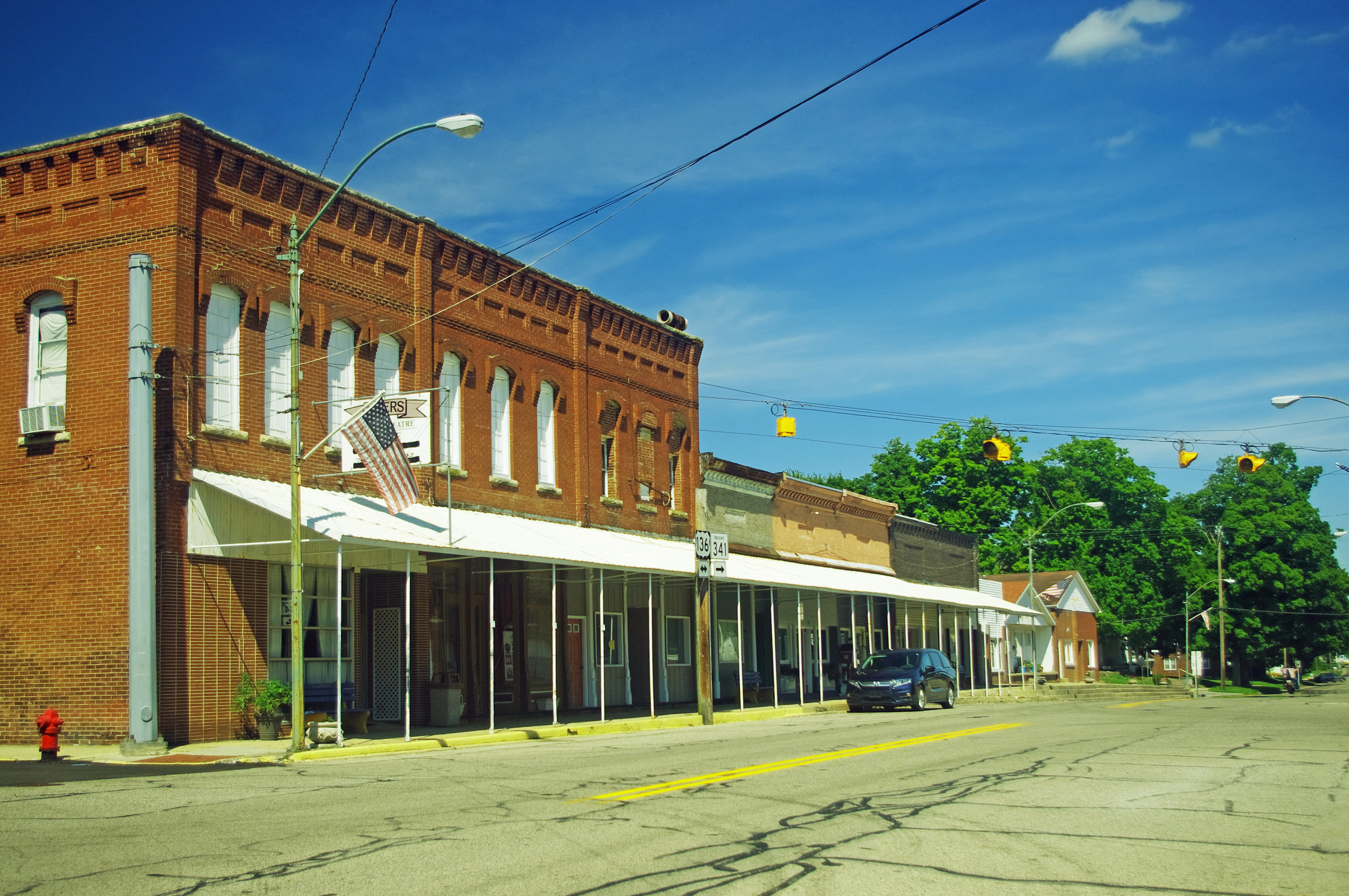
- Main Street (US 136)

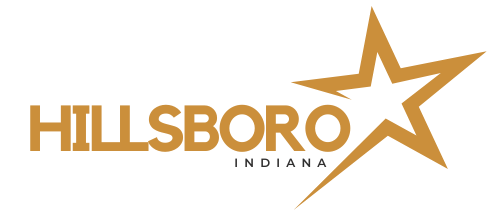
- Logo

- Location of Hillsboro in Fountain County, Indiana.

- Hillsboro's location in Fountain County
- Coordinates: 40°06′32″N 87°09′27″W
- Country: United States
- State: Indiana
- County: Fountain
- Township: Cain

Area
  - Total: 0.31 sq mi (0.81 km^{2})
  - Land: 0.31 sq mi (0.81 km^{2})
  - Water: 0 sq mi (0.00 km^{2})
- Elevation: 712 ft (217 m)

Population (2020)
  - Total: 508
  - Density: 1,622.1/sq mi (626.29/km^{2})
- Time zone: UTC-5 (EST)
  - Summer (DST): UTC-5 (EST)
- ZIP code: 47949
- Area code: 765
- FIPS code: 18-33862
- GNIS feature ID: 2396995
- Website: www.hillsboroin.com

Hillsboro is a town in Cain Township, Fountain County, Indiana, United States. As of the 2020 census, Hillsboro had a population of 508.

== History ==
The post office was established in 1829 as Hillsborough. It was named from the terrain.

In Cain township, at Hillsboro, the oldest church was the Methodist. The building was 30 by 36 feet, costing one thousand six hundred dollars. The society was formed there in 1870, with thirty-two members. The New Light doctrines were then being pressed on the minds of people in this section, and it was a long, hard struggle to maintain the new church, but finally it succeeded, and it had forty-two members in 1880, since which it has advanced.

== Geography ==
Hillsboro is located at the intersection of U.S. Route 136 and State Road 341, about a mile south of Interstate 74.

According to the 2010 census, Hillsboro has a total area of 0.31 square miles (0.80 km^{2}), all land.

== Demographics ==
Historical population
Census	Pop.	Note	%±
1880	266		—
1900	500		—
1910	528		5.6%
1920	537		1.7%
1930	448		−16.6%
1940	516		15.2%
1950	526		1.9%
1960	517		−1.7%
1970	505		−2.3%
1980	561		11.1%
1990	499		−11.1%
2000	489		−2.0%
2010	538		10.0%
2020	508		−5.6%
U.S. Decennial Census

=== 2010 census ===
As of the census of 2010, there were 538 people, 207 households, and 150 families living in the town. The population density was 1,735.5 inhabitants per square mile (670.1/km^{2}). There were 232 housing units at an average density of 748.4 per square mile (289.0/km^{2}). The racial makeup of the town was 96.1% White, 0.2% African American, 0.7% Native American, 1.9% from other races, and 1.1% from two or more races. Hispanic or Latino of any race were 5.4% of the population.

There were 207 households, of which 37.7% had children under the age of 18 living with them, 51.7% were married couples living together, 17.4% had a female householder with no husband present, 3.4% had a male householder with no wife present, and 27.5% were non-families. 21.3% of all households were made up of individuals, and 8.7% had someone living alone who was 65 years of age or older. The average household size was 2.60 and the average family size was 3.01.

The median age in the town was 38.2 years. 27.5% of residents were under the age of 18; 8.1% were between the ages of 18 and 24; 25.1% were from 25 to 44; 26.2% were from 45 to 64; and 13% were 65 years of age or older. The gender makeup of the town was 48.7% male and 51.3% female.

=== 2000 census ===
As of the census of 2000, there were 489 people, 188 households, and 140 families living in the town. The population density was 1,527.5 inhabitants per square mile (589.8/km^{2}). There were 211 housing units at an average density of 659.1 per square mile (254.5/km^{2}). The racial makeup of the town was 99.39% White, 0.20% from other races, and 0.41% from two or more races. Hispanic or Latino of any race were 0.41% of the population.

There were 188 households, out of which 37.8% had children under the age of 18 living with them, 60.6% were married couples living together, 10.1% had a female householder with no husband present, and 25.5% were non-families. 22.9% of all households were made up of individuals, and 11.7% had someone living alone who was 65 years of age or older. The average household size was 2.60 and the average family size was 3.02.

In the town, the population was spread out, with 28.2% under the age of 18, 8.0% from 18 to 24, 30.1% from 25 to 44, 18.8% from 45 to 64, and 14.9% who were 65 years of age or older. The median age was 35 years. For every 100 females, there were 88.8 males. For every 100 females age 18 and over, there were 92.9 males.

The median income for a household in the town was $41,806, and the median income for a family was $46,458. Males had a median income of $30,547 versus $23,611 for females. The per capita income for the town was $16,630. About 8.5% of families and 9.5% of the population were below the poverty line, including 10.7% of those under age 18 and 7.0% of those age 65 or over.
