= Lafayette metropolitan area, Indiana =

Greater Lafayette–West Lafayette
- Metropolitan Area
- Lafayette–West Lafayette, IN; Metropolitan Statistical Area
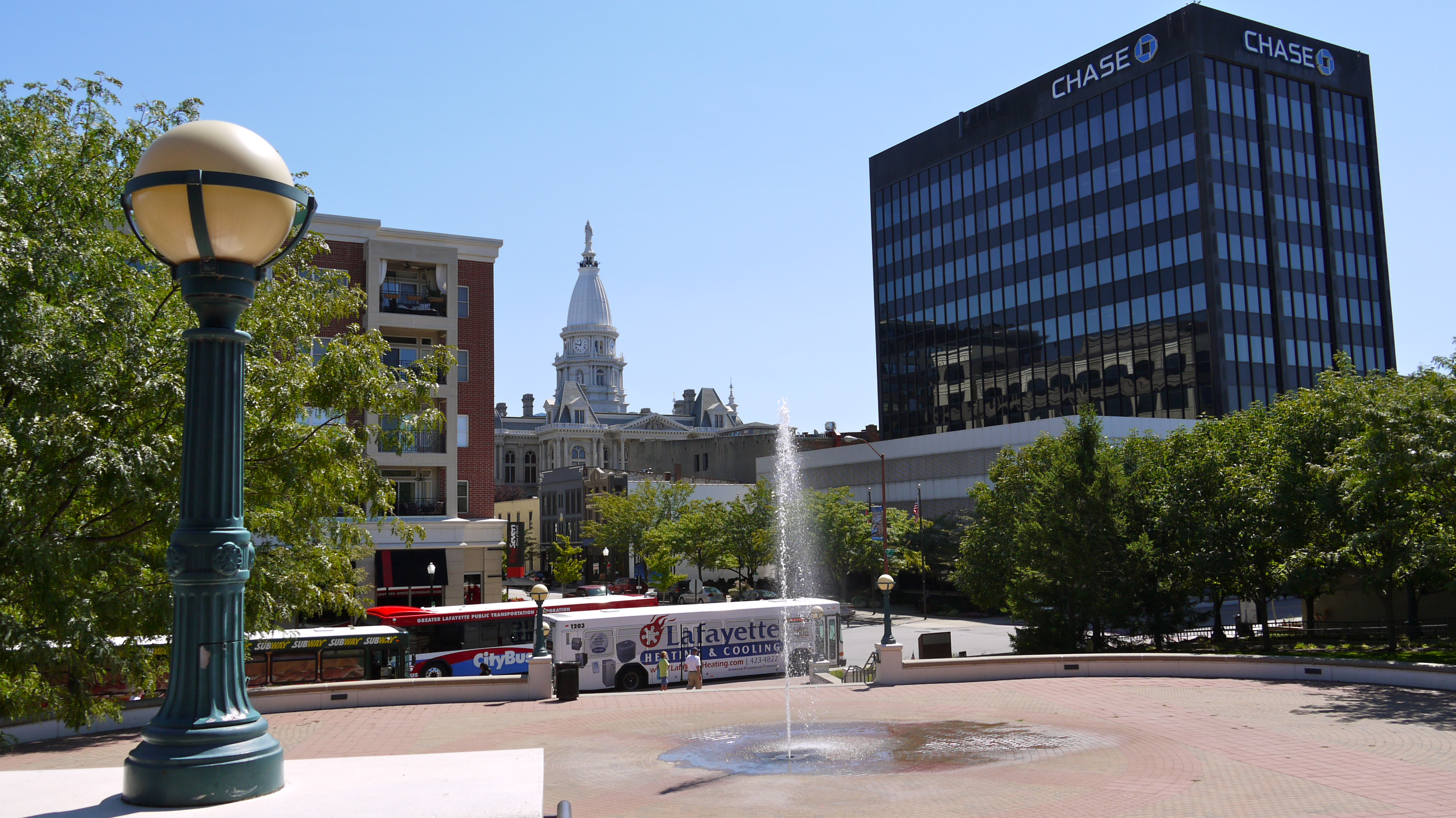
- Downtown Lafayette and the Riehle Plaza and CityBus depot
Lafayette–West Lafayette–Frankfort, IN CSA
City of Lafayette
City of West Lafayette
Lafayette–West Lafayette MSA
Frankfort µSA
Monticello µSA
- Country: United States
- State: Indiana
- Largest city: Lafayette
- Other cities: West Lafayette; Frankfort; Monticello
- Time zone: UTC−05:00 (Eastern Standard Time)
  - Summer (DST): UTC−04:00 (Eastern Daylight Time)

The Lafayette-West Lafayette, Indiana Metropolitan Statistical Area, also known as Greater Lafayette, is an area consisting of four counties in Indiana, anchored by the cities of Lafayette and West Lafayette, as defined by the United States Census Bureau. As of the July 1, 2021, the MSA had an estimated population of 224,709. Metro area population in 2021 is 237,130 and was 235,066 in 2020, a growth of 16% over 2010. In 2010, the Lafayette, Indiana, metro area population was 210,297.

== Counties ==
The metropolitan area consists of the following four counties:

- Benton
- Carroll
- Tippecanoe
- Warren

== Communities ==
=== Places with more than 50,000 inhabitants ===
- Lafayette (Principal city)

=== Places with 25,000 to 50,000 inhabitants ===
- West Lafayette (Principal city)

=== Places with 1,000 to 5,000 inhabitants ===
- Battle Ground
- Dayton
- Delphi
- Flora
- Fowler
- Otterbein
- Oxford
- Shadeland

=== Places with 500 to 1,000 inhabitants ===
- Boswell
- Camden
- Clarks Hill

=== Places with fewer than 500 inhabitants ===
- Ambia
- Burlington
- Earl Park
- Yeoman

=== Unincorporated places ===
- Americus
- Bringhurst
- Buck Creek
- Burrows
- Chase
- Colburn
- Cutler
- Deer Creek
- Dunnington
- Freeland Park
- Heath
- Lockport
- Monitor
- Monroe
- Montmorenci
- Ockley
- Odell
- Owasco
- Pittsburg
- Pyrmont
- Radnor
- Raub
- Rockfield
- Romney
- Sharon
- Stockwell
- Swanington
- Talbot
- Templeton
- Wadena
- West Point
- Wheeling

== Townships ==
=== Benton County ===
- Bolivar
- Center
- Gilboa
- Grant
- Hickory Grove
- Oak Grove
- Parish Grove
- Pine
- Richland
- Union
- York

=== Carroll County ===
- Adams
- Burlington
- Carrollton
- Clay
- Deer Creek
- Democrat
- Jackson
- Jefferson
- Liberty
- Madison
- Monroe
- Rock Creek
- Tippecanoe
- Washington

=== Tippecanoe County ===
- Fairfield
- Jackson
- Lauramie
- Perry
- Randolph
- Sheffield
- Shelby
- Tippecanoe
- Union
- Wabash
- Washington
- Wayne
- Wea

== Demographics ==
As of the census of 2000, there were 178,541 people, 66,502 households, and 40,652 families residing within the MSA. The racial makeup of the MSA was 90.27% White, 2.14% African American, 0.26% Native American, 3.74% Asian, 0.03% Pacific Islander, 2.29% from other races, and 1.28% from two or more races. Hispanic or Latino of any race were 4.86% of the population.

The median income for a household in the MSA was $40,381, and the median income for a family was $49,625. Males had a median income of $34,515 versus $22,899 for females. The per capita income for the MSA was $18,677.

== Combined Statistical Area ==
The Lafayette–West Lafayette–Frankfort Combined Statistical Area (CSA) is made up of six counties in Indiana. The statistical area includes one metropolitan area and two micropolitan areas. As of the 2020 Census, the CSA had a population of 256,906 (though a July 1, 2021 estimate placed the population at 257,774).

=== Components ===
- Metropolitan Statistical Areas (MSAs)
  - Lafayette–West Lafayette (Benton, Carroll, and Tippecanoe counties)
- Micropolitan Statistical Areas (μSA)
  - Frankfort (Clinton County)
  - Monticello (White County)

== See also ==
- Indiana census statistical areas
