= U.S. Rail Corporation =

U S Rail Corporation
Overview
- Headquarters: Toledo, Ohio
- Reporting mark: USRC
- Locale: Indiana, Ohio

Technical
- Track gauge: 4 ft 8 1/2 in (1,435 mm) standard gauge

U S Rail Corporation (reporting mark USRC) is a family-owned short-line railroad operating the Winamac Southern Railway in Indiana.

== Operation ==
=== Kokomo ===
The Kokomo division, in Kokomo, Indiana, operates a line for the Kokomo Grain Company and Winamac Southern Railway, transporting grain and serving the communities of Amboy, Marion, Converse, Sweetser, Galveston, Walton, Logansport, Clymers, Camden, Flora and Bringhurst. It interchanges with Norfolk Southern in Marion and Clymers, Indiana, Toledo, Peoria & Western in Logansport, and Central Railroad of Indianapolis in Kokomo, Indiana.

The Genessee and Wyoming RR line Toledo Peoria and Western absorbed USR operations and now runs 2 crews 6 days a week out of Kokomo Indiana.
