= Indiana State Road 18 =

Highway in Indiana

State Road 18
- SR 18 highlighted in red

Route information
- Maintained by INDOT
- Length: 141.13 mi (227.13 km)
- Existed: October 1, 1926–present

Major junctions
- West end: Illinois state line west of Fowler
- US 41 near Fowler; US 52 / SR 55 in Fowler; US 231 at Round Grove; I-65 near Round Grove; US 421 / SR 39 through Delphi; US 35 at Galveston; US 31 east of Galveston; I-69 near Marion
- East end: US 27 / SR 67 at Bryant

Location
- Country: United States
- State: Indiana
- Counties: Benton, White, Carroll, Cass, Miami, Grant, Blackford, Jay

Highway system
- Indiana State Highway System; Interstate; US; State; Scenic
← SR 17	→ SR 19

State Road 18 (SR 18) in the U.S. state of Indiana is an east–west route in North Central Indiana running from the Illinois border in Benton County almost to the Ohio border, terminating at U.S. Route 27 (US 27)/State Road 67 (SR 67) in Jay County. State Route 18 is mainly a 2-lane road with exception of 4-lane divided highway from Marion to Interstate 69 (I-69). Marion is the only considerably large city that Route 18 passes through. State Route 18 runs just south of the lakes region, with Lake Shafer, Lake Freeman, Mississinewa Reservoir, and Salamonie Reservoir not too far to the north. With the exception of Marion, Route 18 passes through mostly small towns. The terrain is mostly level and is utilized mostly for agriculture.

== Route description ==
SR 18 heads east from the western terminus at the Illinois State line. Then SR 18 has an intersection with State Road 71. SR 18 heads east having an intersection with U.S. Route 41. Then SR 18 heads east towards Fowler, when in Fowler SR 18 begins a concurrency with U.S. Route 52 and State Road 55. All three routes head southeast, until SR 18 turns due east. SR 18 heads east towards Brookston, passing through an intersection with U.S. Route 231 and an interchange with Interstate 65 (I-65). In Brookston SR 18 has a concurrency with State Road 43. From Brookston SR 18 heads east towards Pittsburg, just west of Pittsburg SR 18, begins a concurrency with U.S. Route 421, and State Road 39. All three route heads southeast towards Delphi, west of downtown Delphi State Road 25 joins the concurrency. Then all four routes turn northeast towards downtown Delphi. When in downtown Delphi SR 25 leaves the concurrency on a northeast route as US 421/SR 18/SR 39 turn southeast. South of Delphi SR 18 leaves the concurrency with US 421 and SR 39. SR 18 heads due east towards Flora where SR 18 has an intersection with State Road 75. SR 18 heads east towards Galveston passing through a concurrency with State Road 29. In Galveston SR 18 has an intersection with U.S. Route 35. Then just east of Galveston SR 18 has an intersection with U.S. Route 31.

From US 31, SR 18 heads east towards Converse passing through a concurrency with State Road 19. SR 18 then heads through Converse, after Converse SR 18 has a concurrency with State Road 13. SR 18 turns southeast towards Marion passing through Sweetser. In Marion eastbound SR 18 is on a Fourth Street and westbound SR 18 is on Third Street and Second Street. East of Marion the one-way streets become a four-lane highway. SR 18 heads east towards Montpelier passing through an interchange with I-69 and passing through an intersection with State Road 5 and State Road 3. East of Montpelier SR 18 passes through an intersection with State Road 1. Then SR 18 heads east towards its eastern terminus near Bryant at an intersection with US 27 and SR 67, from this intersection SR 67 heads east towards Ohio.

== Major intersections ==
County	Location	mi	km	Destinations	Notes
Benton	Parish Grove Township	0.000	0.000	Iroquois County Road 880 North	Illinois State Line
Benton	Parish Grove Township	2.002	3.222	SR 71	
Benton	Parish Grove Township	7.798	12.550	US 41 – Terre Haute, Hammond, Boswell	
Benton	Fowler	10.998	17.700	US 52 west / SR 55 north – Kentland, Crown Point	Western end of US 52 and SR 55 concurrences
Benton	Fowler	12.218	19.663	US 52 east / SR 55 south – Indianapolis, Attica	Eastern end of US 52 and SR 55 concurrences
White	Round Grove Township	26.754	43.056	US 231 – Lafayette, Crown Point	
White	Round Grove Township	29.369– 29.524	47.265– 47.514	I-65 – Indianapolis, Gary	
White	Brookston	35.277	56.773	SR 43 north – Reynolds	Northern end of SR 43 concurrency
White	Brookston	35.458	57.064	SR 43 south – Lafayette	Eastern end of SR 43 concurrency
Carroll	Tippecanoe Township	42.728	68.764	US 421 north / SR 39 north – Michigan City, La Porte	Western end of US 421 and SR 39 concurrences
Carroll	Delphi	48.111	77.427	SR 25 north – Lafayette, Logansport	
Carroll	Deer Creek Township	49.261	79.278	US 421 south / SR 39 – Frankfort, Indianapolis	Eastern end of US 421 and SR 39 concurrences
Carroll	Flora	55.278	88.961	SR 75	
Carroll	Carrollton Township	62.521	100.618	SR 29 south	Southern end of SR 29 concurrency
Carroll	Carrollton Township	64.018	103.027	SR 29 north – Logansport	Northern end of SR 29 concurrency
Cass	Galveston	75.094	120.852	US 35 – Kokomo, Logansport	
Miami	Deer Creek Township	78.571	126.448	US 31	
Miami	Jackson Township	89.520	144.068	SR 19 north – Elkhart	Western end of SR 19 concurrency
Grant	Richland Township	95.034	152.942	SR 13 south / SR 19 south – Elwood	Southern end of SR 13 concurrency; eastern end of SR 19 concurrency
Grant	Richland Township	95.447	153.607	SR 13 north – Wabash	Northern end of SR 13 concurrency
Grant	Marion	103.502	166.570	SR 9 / SR 15 – Anderson, Gas City, Huntington, Wabash	
Grant	Marion	110.124– 110.234	177.227– 177.404	I-69 – Indianapolis, Fort Wayne	
Grant	Monroe Township	112.661	181.310	SR 5 – Upland, Warren	
Blackford	Washington Township	119.659	192.572	SR 3 – Hartford City, Markle	
Jay	Montpelier	131.395	211.460	SR 1 – Cambridge, Fort Wayne	
Jay	Bryant	141.476	227.684	US 27 / SR 67 – Portland, Decatur, Celina	Eastern terminus of SR 18
1.000 mi = 1.609 km; 1.000 km = 0.621 mi: Concurrency terminus
