= Carrollton, Indiana =

Carrollton is the name of the following places in the U.S. state of Indiana:

- Carrollton, Carroll County, Indiana
- Carrollton, Hancock County, Indiana
