= Carroll County, Indiana =

County in Indiana, United States

- County
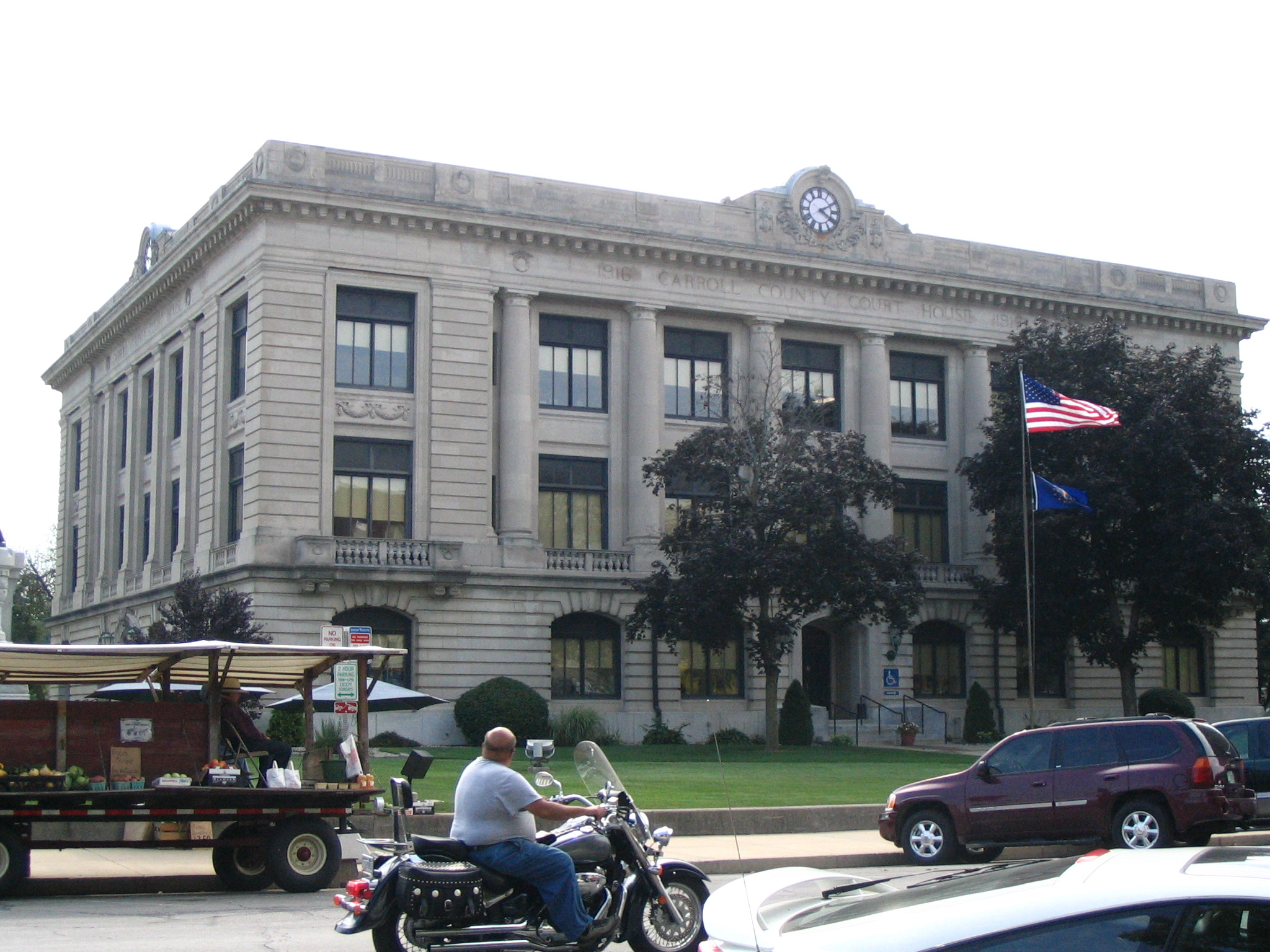
- Carroll County Courthouse in Delphi

- Seal

- Location within the U.S. state of Indiana
- Coordinates: 40°35′N 86°34′W
- Country: United States
- State: Indiana
- Founded: January 17, 1828 (authorized); April 28, 1828 (organized)
- Named for: Charles Carroll of Carrollton
- Seat: Delphi
- Largest city: Delphi

Area
  - Total: 375.02 sq mi (971.3 km^{2})
  - Land: 372.22 sq mi (964.0 km^{2})
  - Water: 2.80 sq mi (7.3 km^{2}) 0.75%

Population (2020)
  - Total: 20,306
  - Estimate (2025): 20,655 ▲
  - Density: 54.554/sq mi (21.063/km^{2})
- Time zone: UTC−5 (Eastern)
  - Summer (DST): UTC−4 (EDT)
- Congressional district: 4th
- Website: www.in.gov/counties/carroll/
- Indiana county number 8

Carroll County is a county located in the U.S. state of Indiana. As of the 2020 United States census, the population was 20,306. The county seat is Delphi. Other towns within the county include Flora, Burlington, Camden, Cutler, Bringhurst and Deer Creek. Carroll County is part of the Lafayette, Indiana, Metropolitan Statistical Area.

== History ==
In 1787, the fledgling United States defined the Northwest Territory, which included the area of present-day Indiana. In 1800, Congress separated Ohio from the Northwest Territory, designating the rest of the land as the Indiana Territory. President Thomas Jefferson chose William Henry Harrison as the territory's first governor, and Vincennes was established as the territorial capital. After the Michigan Territory was separated and the Illinois Territory was formed, Indiana was reduced to its current size and geography. By December 1816, the Indiana Territory was admitted to the Union as a state.

Starting in 1794, Native American titles to Indiana lands were extinguished by usurpation, purchase, or war and treaty. The United States acquired land from the Native Americans in the treaty of St. Mary's in 1818, which included most of the future county, and in 1826 the Treaty of Mississinewas made more area available for settlement. These two treaties resolved the occupation issue for the future Carroll County.

White people had been living in the future Carroll County area since 1824 and their numbers increased rapidly in the next few years. Accordingly, Carroll County was authorized by the state legislature on January 17, 1828; it was named for Charles Carroll, the last surviving signer of the Declaration of Independence, who died in 1832. The first commissioners began organizing the county government on April 28 of that year and determined to site the county seat at land donated by William Wilson. The name 'Carrollton' was first suggested for the new community, but at the suggestion of General Samuel Milroy, 'Delphi' was selected instead.

The Wabash and Erie Canal, built through the county in 1840 and operating until the early 1870s, is among the county's most significant historical legacies.

=== Courthouse ===
The first county courthouse was built in 1831. It was replaced by a brick structure in 1856. The 730-pound bell from the first courthouse was made in Cincinnati in 1836 and given by Sheriff Samuel Davis Gresham and was used in the second courthouse until 1916. While the bell was in transit to Lafayette by boat, the boat sank. The bell was recovered from the Ohio River, and was sold, but was returned to Carroll County in 1967.

The current Carroll County courthouse was designed by Jaxson Cowell of Indianapolis, who also designed the Spencer County courthouse. It was constructed by A. E. Kemmer at a cost of about $250,000 from 1916 to 1917. The exterior is understated, but the interior is surprisingly elaborate, including a stained glass dome over a mosaic tile floor.

== Geography ==
The Wabash River flows southwestward from Cass County through the upper part of Carroll County, exiting into Tippecanoe County. The Tippecanoe River flows southward through the county's upper west edge, also exiting into Tippecanoe County, where it merges with the Wabash shortly after leaving Carroll County's border. Wildcat Creek drains the south part of Carroll County, flowing westward into Tippecanoe to merge with the Wabash there.

The terrain of Carroll County was heavily wooded at the start, but now the flat areas are cleared and devoted to agriculture or urban development, with only the drainage areas still wooded. The highest point on the terrain (830 feet/250 meters ASL) is the county's SE corner.

According to the 2010 census, the county has a total area of 375.02 square miles (971.3 km^{2}), of which 372.22 square miles (964.0 km^{2}) (or 99.25%) is land and 2.80 square miles (7.3 km^{2}) (or 0.75%) is water.

=== Adjacent counties ===
- Cass County − northeast
- Howard County − east
- Clinton County − south
- Tippecanoe County − southwest
- White County − northwest

=== City ===
- Delphi (county seat)

=== Towns ===
- Burlington
- Camden
- Flora
- Yeoman

=== Census-designated places ===
- Bringhurst
- Burrows
- Deer Creek
- Rockfield

=== Unincorporated communities ===
- Adams Mill
- Carrollton
- Cutler
- Lexington
- Lockport
- Ockley
- Owasco
- Patton
- Pittsburg
- Prince William
- Pyrmont
- Radnor
- Sharon
- Terrace Bay
- Wheeling

=== Townships ===
- Adams
- Burlington
- Carrollton
- Clay
- Deer Creek
- Democrat
- Jackson
- Jefferson
- Liberty
- Madison
- Monroe
- Rock Creek
- Tippecanoe
- Washington

=== Major highways ===
- U.S. Route 421
- Indiana State Road 18
- Indiana State Road 22
- Indiana State Road 25
- Indiana State Road 29
- Indiana State Road 39
- Indiana State Road 75
- Indiana State Road 218

=== Railroads ===
- Norfolk Southern Railway
- Winamac Southern Railway

== Climate and weather ==
Delphi, Indiana

Climate chart (precipitation, max. and min. temperature)
J	F	M	A	M	J	J	A	S	O	N	D
2 33 17	1.9 39 21	2.9 51 31	3.5 64 40	3.9 74 50	4.1 83 60	4.2 86 63	4 84 61	2.9 78 53	2.7 66 42	3.1 51 33	2.7 38 23
- █ Average max. and min. temperatures in °F
- █ Precipitation totals in inches
- Source: The Weather Channel
Metric conversion
J	F	M	A	M	J	J	A	S	O	N	D
51 1 −8	49 4 −6	75 11 −1	88 18 4	99 23 10	103 28 16	106 30 17	101 29 16	75 26 12	69 19 6	79 11 1	68 3 −5
- █ Average max. and min. temperatures in °C
- █ Precipitation totals in mm

In recent years, average temperatures in Delphi have ranged from a low of 17 °F (−8 °C) in January to a high of 86 °F (30 °C) in July, although a record low of −25 °F (−32 °C) was recorded in January 1963 and a record high of 107 °F (42 °C) was recorded in July 1954. Average monthly precipitation ranged from 1.94 inches (49 mm) in February to 4.16 inches (106 mm) in July.

== Government ==
The county government is a constitutional body, and is granted specific powers by the Constitution of Indiana, and by the Indiana Code.

County Council: The legislative branch of the county government; controls spending and revenue collection in the county. Representatives are elected to four-year terms from county districts. They set salaries, the annual budget, and special spending. The council has limited authority to impose local taxes, in the form of an income and property tax that is subject to state level approval, excise taxes, and service taxes.

Board of Commissioners: The executive body of the county; commissioners are elected county-wide to staggered four-year terms. One commissioner serves as president. The commissioners execute acts legislated by the council, collect revenue, and manage the county government.

Court: The county maintains a small claims court that handles civil cases. The judge on the court is elected to a term of four years and must be a member of the Indiana Bar Association. The judge is assisted by a constable who is also elected to a four-year term. In some cases, court decisions can be appealed to the state level circuit court.

County Officials: The county has other elected offices, including sheriff, coroner, auditor, treasurer, recorder, surveyor, and circuit court clerk. These officers are elected to four-year terms. Members elected to county government positions are required to declare a party affiliation and to be residents of the county.

Carroll County is part of Indiana's 4th congressional district and is represented by Jim Baird in the United States Congress. It is also part of Indiana Senate district 7 and Indiana House of Representatives district 24.

United States presidential election results for Carroll County, Indiana
Year	Republican		Democratic		Third party(ies)	
Year	No.	%	No.	%	No.	%
1888	2,607	48.96%	2,560	48.08%	158	2.97%
1892	2,230	44.43%	2,361	47.04%	428	8.53%
1896	2,546	47.43%	2,764	51.49%	58	1.08%
1900	2,585	47.59%	2,690	49.52%	157	2.89%
1904	2,671	49.96%	2,420	45.27%	255	4.77%
1908	2,546	47.46%	2,590	48.28%	229	4.27%
1912	1,467	30.03%	2,275	46.57%	1,143	23.40%
1916	2,468	49.09%	2,401	47.75%	159	3.16%
1920	5,006	53.92%	4,186	45.09%	92	0.99%
1924	4,543	53.52%	3,660	43.11%	286	3.37%
1928	4,780	59.54%	3,182	39.64%	66	0.82%
1932	3,853	43.79%	4,866	55.30%	80	0.91%
1936	4,426	48.28%	4,676	51.01%	65	0.71%
1940	5,012	54.05%	4,214	45.44%	47	0.51%
1944	4,872	57.28%	3,578	42.07%	55	0.65%
1948	4,597	53.99%	3,845	45.16%	72	0.85%
1952	5,902	64.31%	3,208	34.95%	68	0.74%
1956	5,748	63.26%	3,312	36.45%	26	0.29%
1960	5,411	61.88%	3,299	37.73%	34	0.39%
1964	3,896	44.71%	4,789	54.96%	29	0.33%
1968	4,796	56.19%	2,816	32.99%	923	10.81%
1972	5,885	72.32%	2,214	27.21%	38	0.47%
1976	4,797	56.48%	3,606	42.46%	90	1.06%
1980	5,262	60.49%	2,966	34.10%	471	5.41%
1984	5,528	66.09%	2,774	33.17%	62	0.74%
1988	4,981	62.54%	2,952	37.07%	31	0.39%
1992	3,800	44.38%	2,561	29.91%	2,201	25.71%
1996	4,062	50.58%	2,747	34.20%	1,222	15.22%
2000	5,102	61.71%	2,965	35.86%	201	2.43%
2004	5,868	67.93%	2,689	31.13%	81	0.94%
2008	4,858	55.61%	3,736	42.77%	142	1.63%
2012	4,999	64.01%	2,635	33.74%	176	2.25%
2016	6,273	72.10%	1,892	21.74%	536	6.16%
2020	7,086	74.48%	2,224	23.38%	204	2.14%
2024	6,902	75.15%	2,120	23.08%	162	1.76%

== Demographics ==
Historical population
Census	Pop.	Note	%±
1830	1,611		—
1840	7,819		385.4%
1850	11,015		40.9%
1860	13,489		22.5%
1870	16,152		19.7%
1880	18,345		13.6%
1890	20,021		9.1%
1900	19,953		−0.3%
1910	17,970		−9.9%
1920	16,315		−9.2%
1930	15,049		−7.8%
1940	15,410		2.4%
1950	16,010		3.9%
1960	16,934		5.8%
1970	17,734		4.7%
1980	19,722		11.2%
1990	18,809		−4.6%
2000	20,165		7.2%
2010	20,155		0.0%
2020	20,306		0.7%
2025 (est.)	20,655	▲	1.7%
US Decennial Census; 1790-1960 1900-1990; 1990-2000 2010

=== Racial and ethnic composition ===
Carroll County, Indiana – Racial and ethnic composition Note: the US Census treats Hispanic/Latino as an ethnic category. This table excludes Latinos from the racial categories and assigns them to a separate category. Hispanics/Latinos may be of any race.
Race / Ethnicity (NH = Non-Hispanic)	Pop 1980	Pop 1990	Pop 2000	Pop 2010	Pop 2020	% 1980	% 1990	% 2000	% 2010	% 2020
White alone (NH)	19,556	18,640	19,413	19,188	18,727	99.16%	99.10%	96.27%	95.20%	92.22%
Black or African American alone (NH)	17	19	36	42	128	0.09%	0.10%	0.18%	0.21%	0.63%
Native American or Alaska Native alone (NH)	23	22	33	33	33	0.12%	0.12%	0.16%	0.16%	0.16%
Asian alone (NH)	15	3	12	20	48	0.08%	0.02%	0.06%	0.10%	0.24%
Native Hawaiian or Pacific Islander alone (NH)	x	x	0	1	0	x	x	0.00%	0.00%	0.00%
Other race alone (NH)	7	4	3	13	57	0.04%	0.02%	0.01%	0.06%	0.28%
Mixed race or Multiracial (NH)	x	x	77	147	490	x	x	0.38%	0.73%	2.41%
Hispanic or Latino (any race)	104	121	591	711	823	0.53%	0.64%	2.93%	3.53%	4.05%
Total	19,722	18,809	20,165	20,155	20,306	100.00%	100.00%	100.00%	100.00%	100.00%

=== 2020 census ===
As of the 2020 census, the county had a population of 20,306. The median age was 42.5 years. 23.6% of residents were under the age of 18 and 19.3% of residents were 65 years of age or older. For every 100 females there were 100.9 males, and for every 100 females age 18 and over there were 97.9 males age 18 and over.

The racial makeup of the county was 93.5% White, 0.8% Black or African American, 0.3% American Indian and Alaska Native, 0.2% Asian, <0.1% Native Hawaiian and Pacific Islander, 1.7% from some other race, and 3.5% from two or more races. Hispanic or Latino residents of any race comprised 4.1% of the population.

5.4% of residents lived in urban areas, while 94.6% lived in rural areas.

There were 8,125 households in the county, of which 29.5% had children under the age of 18 living in them. Of all households, 55.4% were married-couple households, 17.2% were households with a male householder and no spouse or partner present, and 19.9% were households with a female householder and no spouse or partner present. About 25.1% of all households were made up of individuals and 11.6% had someone living alone who was 65 years of age or older.

There were 9,483 housing units, of which 14.3% were vacant. Among occupied housing units, 81.1% were owner-occupied and 18.9% were renter-occupied. The homeowner vacancy rate was 1.7% and the rental vacancy rate was 7.7%.

=== 2010 census ===
As of the 2010 United States census, there were 20,155 people, 7,900 households, and 5,678 families in the county. The population density was 54.1 inhabitants per square mile (20.9/km^{2}). There were 9,472 housing units at an average density of 25.4 per square mile (9.8/km^{2}). The racial makeup of the county was 96.8% white, 0.2% American Indian, 0.2% black or African American, 0.1% Asian, 1.7% from other races, and 1.0% from two or more races. Those of Hispanic or Latino origin made up 3.5% of the population. In terms of ancestry, 29.7% were German, 14.7% were American, 12.6% were Irish, and 8.8% were English.

Of the 7,900 households, 32.1% had children under the age of 18 living with them, 59.5% were married couples living together, 7.3% had a female householder with no husband present, 28.1% were non-families, and 24.0% of all households were made up of individuals. The average household size was 2.54 and the average family size was 2.98. The median age was 40.9 years.

The median income for a household in the county was $47,697 and the median income for a family was $60,420. Males had a median income of $46,241 versus $29,541 for females. The per capita income for the county was $23,163. About 6.1% of families and 9.4% of the population were below the poverty line, including 11.0% of those under age 18 and 8.3% of those age 65 or over.

== Education ==
Public schools in Carroll County are administered by the following school districts:

- Carroll Consolidated School District
- Delphi Community School Corporation
- Rossville Consolidated School District
- Twin Lakes School Corporation

High schools and middle schools

- Delphi Community High School
- Delphi Community Middle School
- Carroll Consolidated School

Elementary schools

- Carroll Elementary School
- Delphi Community Elementary School

== See also ==
- National Register of Historic Places listings in Carroll County, Indiana
