= Burlington Township, Carroll County, Indiana =

Burlington Township
- Township
- Location of Burlington Township in Carroll County
- Coordinates: 40°28′10″N 86°25′15″W
- Country: United States
- State: Indiana
- County: Carroll

Government
  - Type: Indiana township

Area
  - Total: 29.17 sq mi (75.5 km^{2})
  - Land: 29.17 sq mi (75.5 km^{2})
  - Water: 0 sq mi (0 km^{2})
- Elevation: 791 ft (241 m)

Population (2020)
  - Total: 1,612
  - Density: 55.26/sq mi (21.34/km^{2})
- FIPS code: 18-09262
- GNIS feature ID: 453146

Burlington Township is one of fourteen townships in Carroll County, Indiana. As of the 2020 census, its population was 1,612 (down from 1,742 at 2010) and it contained 731 housing units.

== History ==
Burlington Township was organized in 1832.

== Geography ==
According to the 2010 census, the township has a total area of 29.17 square miles (75.5 km^{2}), all land.

=== Cities and towns ===
- Burlington

=== Unincorporated towns ===
- Carrollton

=== Adjacent townships ===
- Carrollton Township (north)
- Ervin Township, Howard County (east)
- Monroe Township, Howard County (east)
- Warren Township, Clinton County (south)
- Owen Township, Clinton County (southwest)
- Democrat Township (west)
- Monroe Township (northwest)

=== Major highways ===
- Indiana State Road 22
- Indiana State Road 29

=== Cemeteries ===
The township contains three cemeteries: Asbury, Burlington and Hyde Park.

== Education ==
Burlington Township residents may obtain a library card at the Burlington Community Library in Burlington.
