= Rockfield =

Rockfield may refer to several places:

== United Kingdom ==
- Rockfield, Highland, Scotland
- Rockfield, Monmouthshire, Wales
  - home of Rockfield Studios
- Rockfield, Swansea, Swansea, Wales
- Rockfield, County Fermanagh, a townland in County Fermanagh, Northern Ireland

== United States ==
- Rockfield, Indiana
- Rockfield, Kentucky, an unincorporated community
- Rockfield, Wisconsin
