= Bringhurst, Indiana =

Bringhurst
- Unincorporated community and Census-designated place
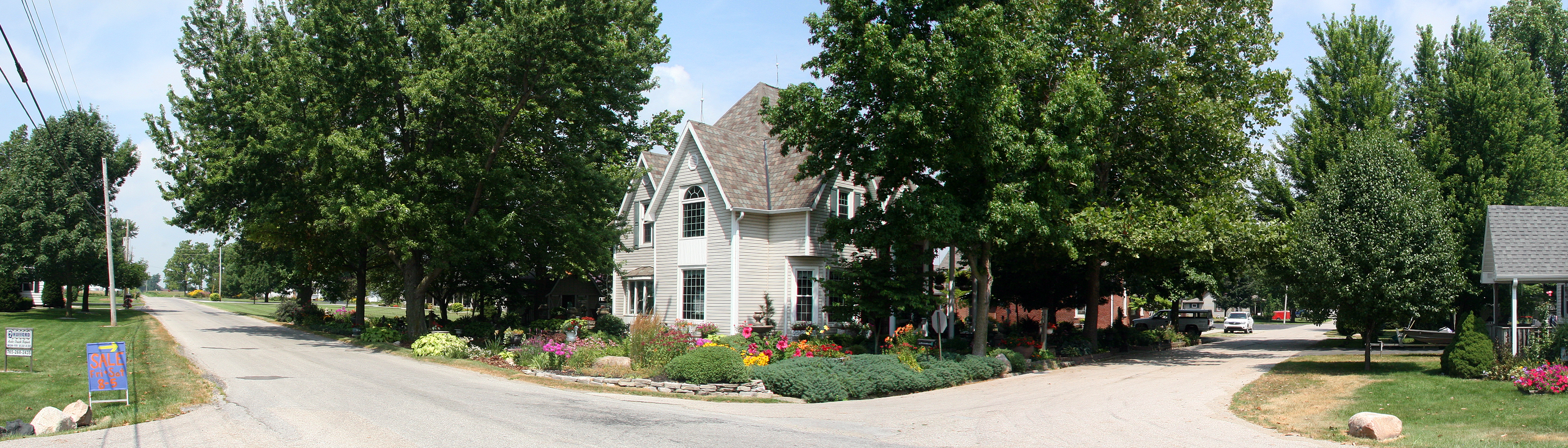
- The corner of Main Street (left) and Walnut Street (right)

- Carroll County's location in Indiana

- Location in Carroll County
- Coordinates: 40°31′37″N 86°31′31″W
- Country: United States
- State: Indiana
- County: Carroll
- Township: Monroe

Area
  - Total: 0.14 sq mi (0.37 km^{2})
  - Land: 0.14 sq mi (0.37 km^{2})
  - Water: 0 sq mi (0.00 km^{2})
- Elevation: 722 ft (220 m)

Population (2020)
  - Total: 215
  - Density: 1,523.8/sq mi (588.36/km^{2})
- ZIP code: 46913
- FIPS code: 18-07714
- GNIS feature ID: 2806460

Bringhurst is an unincorporated community in Monroe Township, Carroll County, Indiana, United States. As of the 2020 census, Bringhurst had a population of 215. It is part of the Lafayette, Indiana Metropolitan Statistical Area.

== History ==
The Bringhurst post office was established in 1872. Bringhurst was named for Colonel Bringhurst.

== Geography ==
Bringhurst is located less than a mile south of the larger community of Flora along the Winamac Southern Railway. Indiana State Road 75 runs north and south along the town's west side.

== Demographics ==
Historical population
Census	Pop.	Note	%±
2020	215		—
U.S. Decennial Census

Bringhurst first appeared as a census designated place in the 2020 U.S. census.
