= Indiana State Road 29 =

Highway in Indiana

State Road 29
- SR 29 highlighted in red

Route information
- Maintained by INDOT
- Length: 31.165 mi (50.155 km)
- Existed: October 1, 1926–present

Major junctions
- South end: US 421 / SR 28 at Boyleston
- North end: US 35 at Logansport

Location
- Country: United States
- State: Indiana
- Counties: Clinton, Carroll, Cass

Highway system
- Indiana State Highway System; Interstate; US; State; Scenic
← SR 28	→ US 30

State Road 29 is a north–south road in north-central Indiana.

== Route description ==
The southern terminus of State Road 29 is at U.S. Route 421 and State Road 28 just south of the small town of Boyleston. Going north, it passes through Michigantown in Clinton County, then along the eastern border of Carroll County where it passes through Burlington. Its northern terminus is at U.S. Route 24 and U.S. Route 35 on the south side of Logansport.

== History ==
At one time, State Road 29 was much longer, going from Madison in the south to Michigan City in the north; when US 421 was commissioned, it took over much of the route. The original road was laid out in the 1830s and construction on the first road was completed in 1841. It was known as "Michigan Road".

The route from Logansport to Michigan city followed the current US 35. Following US 35's commissioning in Indiana, SR 29 became concurrent with US 35. SR 29's northern terminus was truncated to Logansport by 1955 in favor of US 35.

== Major intersections ==
County	Location	mi	km	Destinations	Notes
Clinton	Michigan Township	0.000	0.000	US 421 / SR 28 – Frankfort, Indianapolis, Tipton	Southern terminus of SR 29
Clinton	Warren Township	9.411	15.146	SR 26 – Lafayette, Kokomo	
Carroll	Burlington	13.858	22.302	SR 22 east – Kokomo	Western terminus of SR 22
Carroll	Carrollton Township	18.463	29.713	SR 18 west – Delphi	Southern end of SR 18 concurrency
Carroll	Carrollton Township	19.032	30.629	SR 18 east – Marion	Northern end of SR 18 concurrency
Carroll	Washington Township	22.843	36.762	SR 218 west	Southern end of SR 218 concurrency
Carroll	Washington Township	26.420	42.519	SR 218 east	Northern end of SR 218 concurremcy
Cass	Washington Township	30.672	49.362	SR 329 north	Southern terminus of SR 329
Cass	Logansport	31.091– 31.165	50.036– 50.155	US 35 / US 24 / SR 25 / Hoosier Heartland – LaPorte, Peru	Northern terminus of SR 29
1.000 mi = 1.609 km; 1.000 km = 0.621 mi: Concurrency terminus
