= Burrows, Indiana =

Burrows
- Unincorporated community and Census-designated place
- Carroll County's location in Indiana

- Location in Carroll County
- Coordinates: 40°40′45″N 86°30′12″W
- Country: United States
- State: Indiana
- County: Carroll
- Township: Liberty

Area
  - Total: 0.39 sq mi (1.01 km^{2})
  - Land: 0.39 sq mi (1.01 km^{2})
  - Water: 0 sq mi (0.00 km^{2})
- Elevation: 699 ft (213 m)

Population (2020)
  - Total: 125
  - Density: 319.4/sq mi (123.31/km^{2})
- Time zone: UTC-5 (EST)
  - Summer (DST): UTC-4 (EST)
- ZIP code: 46916
- Area code: 574
- FIPS code: 18-09460
- GNIS feature ID: 2806463

Burrows is an unincorporated community in Liberty Township, Carroll County, Indiana, United States. As of the 2020 census, Burrows had a population of 125. It is part of the Lafayette, Indiana Metropolitan Statistical Area .

== History ==
The Burrows post office was originally called Cornucopia. The post office opened at Burrows (Cornucopia) in 1853.

== Geography ==
Burrows is located along Indiana State Road 25 and the Norfolk Southern Railway.

== Demographics ==
Historical population
Census	Pop.	Note	%±
2020	125		—
U.S. Decennial Census

Burrows first appeared as a census designated place in the 2020 U.S. census.
