= District School No. 3 (Rockfield, Indiana) =

- U.S. National Register of Historic Places
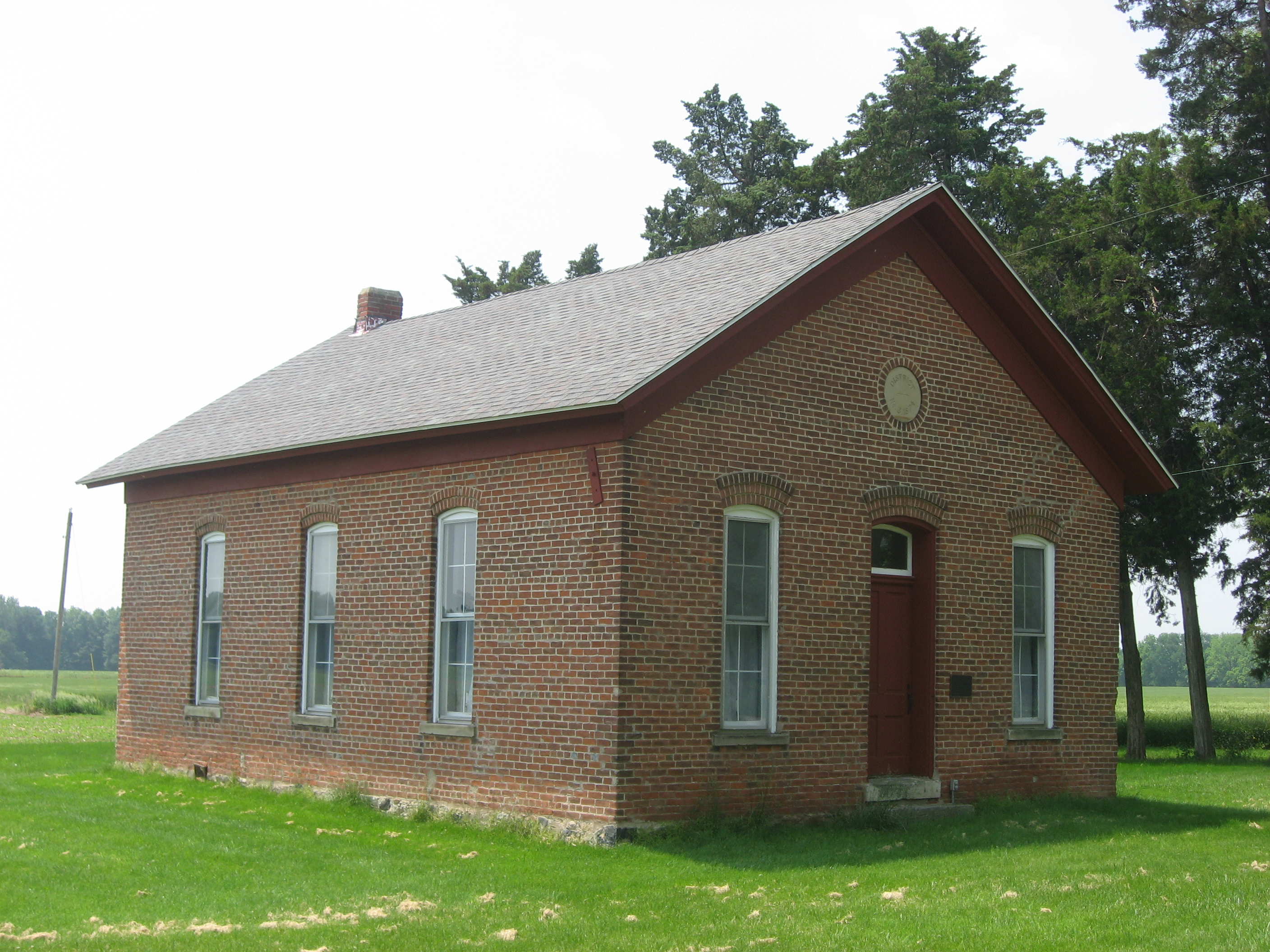
- District School No. 3, June 2011

- Location within Carroll County, Indiana Location within Indiana Location within the United States
- Location: Southeastern corner of the junction of County Roads 750N and 100W, northeast of Rockfield, Rock Creek Township, Carroll County, Indiana
- Coordinates: 40°39′21″N 86°32′38″W
- Area: less than one acre
- Built: 1874
- Architectural style: Italianate, Greek Revival
- NRHP reference No.: 88000374
- Added to NRHP: March 31, 1988

District School No. 3, also known as Rock Creek Township School No. 3, Election School, and Martin School, is a historic school building located in Rockfield, Indiana in Rock Creek Township, Carroll County, Indiana. It was built in 1874, and is a one-story, rectangular red brick building with Greek Revival and Italianate style design elements. It has a front gable roof and sits on a fieldstone foundation.

It was listed on the National Register of Historic Places in 1988.
