= Ockley, Indiana =

- Unincorporated community
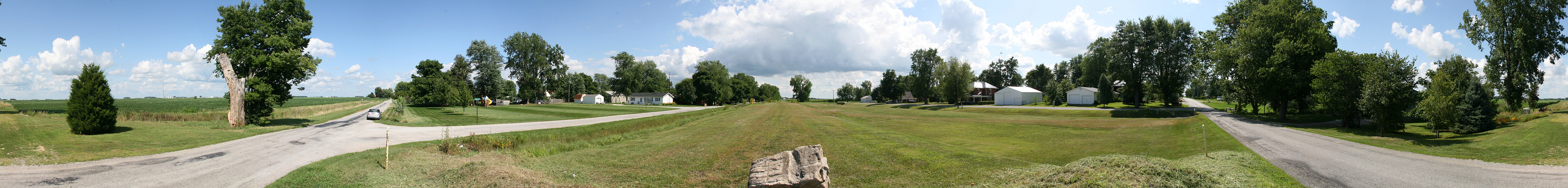
- A 360-degree panorama centered on the defunct railroad

- Carroll County's location in Indiana

- Location in Carroll County
- Coordinates: 40°29′18″N 86°38′02″W
- Country: United States
- State: Indiana
- County: Carroll
- Township: Madison
- Elevation: 696 ft (212 m)
- Time zone: UTC-5 (Eastern (EST))
  - Summer (DST): UTC-4 (EDT)
- ZIP code: 46923
- FIPS code: 18-56016
- GNIS feature ID: 440498

Ockley is an unincorporated community in Madison Township, Carroll County, in the U.S. state of Indiana.

The community is part of the Lafayette, Indiana Metropolitan Statistical Area.

== History ==
A post office was established at Ockley in 1884, and remained in operation until it was discontinued in 1976. The origin of the name Ockley is obscure, but it could possibly be of Native American origin.
