= Patton, Indiana =

Patton
- Unincorporated community
- Carroll County's location in Indiana

- Location in Carroll County
- Coordinates: 40°42′29″N 86°44′26″W
- Country: United States
- State: Indiana
- County: Carroll
- Township: Jefferson
- Elevation: 679 ft (207 m)
- ZIP code: 47960
- FIPS code: 18-58428
- GNIS feature ID: 440936

Patton is an unincorporated community in Jefferson Township, Carroll County, Indiana.

== History ==
A post office was established at Patton in 1880, and remained in operation until it was discontinued in 1913. The community was named for its founder, H. Patton.

Patton was located on the Monon Railroad.
