= Radnor, Indiana =

Radnor
- Unincorporated community
- Carroll County's location in Indiana

- Location in Carroll County
- Coordinates: 40°30′34″N 86°38′06″W
- Country: United States
- State: Indiana
- County: Carroll
- Township: Madison
- Elevation: 689 ft (210 m)
- ZIP code: 46923
- FIPS code: 18-62694
- GNIS feature ID: 441727

Radnor is an unincorporated community in Madison Township, Carroll County, Indiana. It is part of the Lafayette, Indiana Metropolitan Statistical Area.

== History ==
A post office was established at Radnor in 1883, and remained in operation until it was discontinued in 1975. It may be named after Radnor, Pennsylvania.
