= Carrollton Township, Carroll County, Indiana =

Carrollton Township
- Township
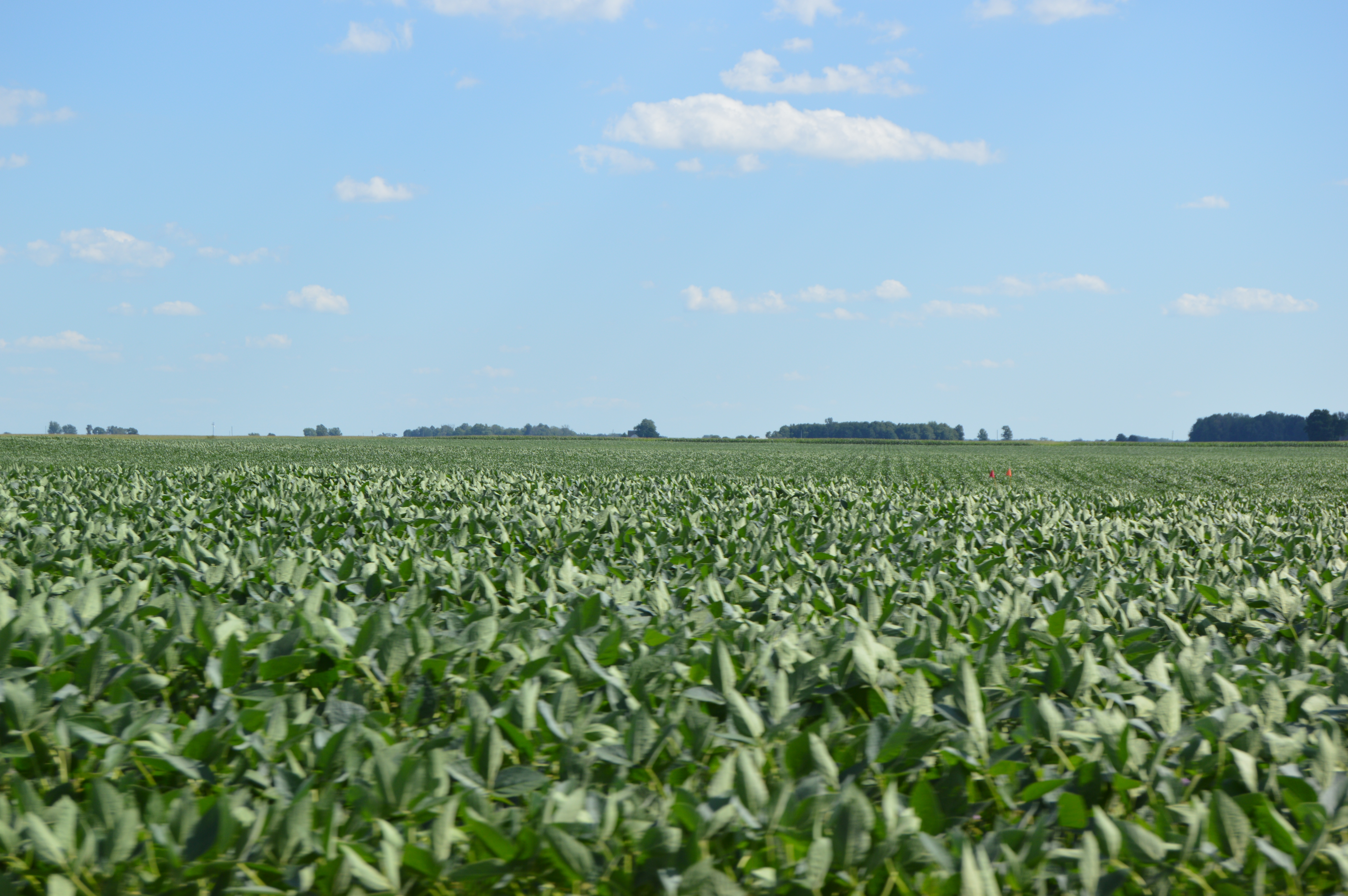
- Cornfield southeast of Sharon

- Location of Carrollton Township in Carroll County
- Coordinates: 40°33′36″N 86°25′12″W
- Country: United States
- State: Indiana
- County: Carroll

Government
  - Type: Indiana township

Area
  - Total: 29.59 sq mi (76.6 km^{2})
  - Land: 29.58 sq mi (76.6 km^{2})
  - Water: 0.01 sq mi (0.026 km^{2})
- Elevation: 725 ft (221 m)

Population (2020)
  - Total: 651
  - Density: 22.0/sq mi (8.50/km^{2})
- FIPS code: 18-10540
- GNIS feature ID: 453160

Carrollton Township is one of fourteen townships in Carroll County, Indiana. As of the 2020 census, its population was 651 (up from 598 at 2010) and it contained 240 housing units.

== History ==
Carrollton Township was organized in 1835.

== Geography ==
According to the 2010 census, the township has a total area of 29.59 square miles (76.6 km^{2}), of which 29.58 square miles (76.6 km^{2}) (or 99.97%) is land and 0.01 square miles (0.026 km^{2}) (or 0.03%) is water.

=== Unincorporated towns ===
- Sharon
- Wheeling

=== Adjacent townships ===
- Washington Township (north)
- Deer Creek Township, Cass County (northeast)
- Ervin Township, Howard County (east)
- Burlington Township (south)
- Jackson Township (west)
- Monroe Township (west)

=== Major highways ===
- Indiana State Road 18
- Indiana State Road 29
- Indiana State Road 218
