= Yeoman, Indiana =

- Town
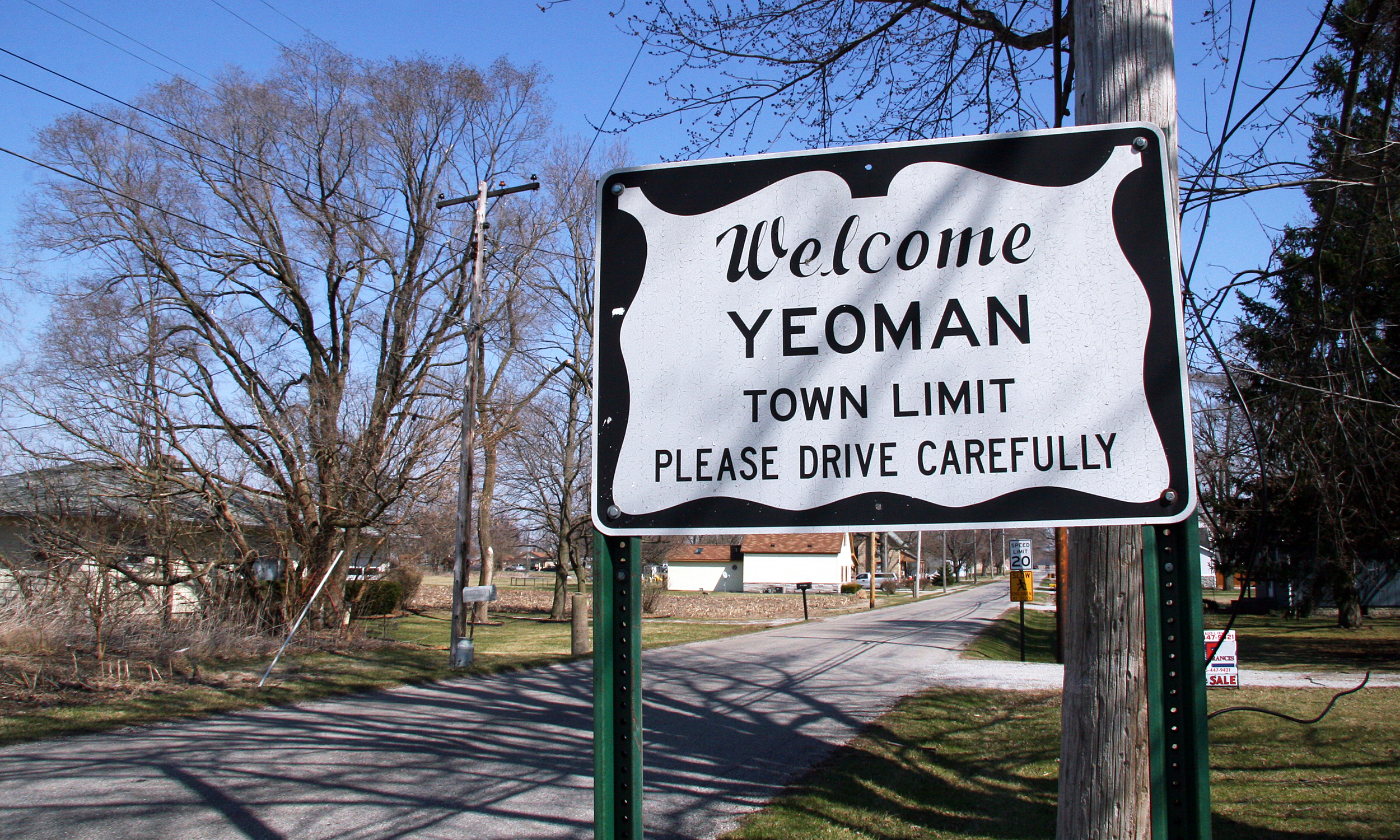

- Location of Yeoman in Carroll County, Indiana.
- Coordinates: 40°40′04″N 86°43′26″W
- Country: United States
- State: Indiana
- County: Carroll
- Township: Jefferson

Area
  - Total: 0.13 sq mi (0.33 km^{2})
  - Land: 0.13 sq mi (0.33 km^{2})
  - Water: 0 sq mi (0.00 km^{2})
- Elevation: 663 ft (202 m)

Population (2020)
  - Total: 116
  - Density: 912.4/sq mi (352.29/km^{2})
- Time zone: UTC-5 (Eastern (EST))
  - Summer (DST): UTC-4 (EDT)
- ZIP code: 47997
- Area code: 574
- FIPS code: 18-85886
- GNIS feature ID: 2397758

Yeoman is a town in Jefferson Township, Carroll County, Indiana, United States. As of the 2020 census, Yeoman had a population of 116. It is part of the Lafayette, Indiana Metropolitan Statistical Area.

== History ==
Yeoman was platted in 1880. It was named for Col. Yeoman, a railroad employee.

== Geography ==
According to the 2010 census, Yeoman has a total area of 0.12 square miles (0.31 km^{2}), all land.

== Demographics ==
Historical population
Census	Pop.	Note	%±
1930	160		—
1940	160		0.0%
1950	180		12.5%
1960	172		−4.4%
1970	145		−15.7%
1980	154		6.2%
1990	131		−14.9%
2000	96		−26.7%
2010	139		44.8%
2020	116		−16.5%
U.S. Decennial Census

=== 2010 census ===
As of the census of 2010, there were 139 people, 51 households, and 38 families living in the town. The population density was 1,158.3 inhabitants per square mile (447.2/km^{2}). There were 54 housing units at an average density of 450.0 per square mile (173.7/km^{2}). The racial makeup of the town was 100.0% White.

There were 51 households, of which 49.0% had children under the age of 18 living with them, 43.1% were married couples living together, 11.8% had a female householder with no husband present, 19.6% had a male householder with no wife present, and 25.5% were non-families. 21.6% of all households were made up of individuals, and 7.9% had someone living alone who was 65 years of age or older. The average household size was 2.73 and the average family size was 2.92.

The median age in the town was 27.1 years. 28.8% of residents were under the age of 18; 13.8% were between the ages of 18 and 24; 30.1% were from 25 to 44; 23% were from 45 to 64; and 4.3% were 65 years of age or older. The gender makeup of the town was 49.6% male and 50.4% female.

=== 2000 census ===
As of the census of 2000, there were 96 people, 40 households, and 26 families living in the town. The population density was 787.3 inhabitants per square mile (304.0/km^{2}). There were 47 housing units at an average density of 385.5 per square mile (148.8/km^{2}). The racial makeup of the town was 100.00% White. Hispanic or Latino of any race were 3.12% of the population.

There were 40 households, out of which 32.5% had children under the age of 18 living with them, 45.0% were married couples living together, 15.0% had a female householder with no husband present, and 35.0% were non-families. 32.5% of all households were made up of individuals, and 10.0% had someone living alone who was 65 years of age or older. The average household size was 2.40 and the average family size was 3.04.

In the town, the population was spread out, with 27.1% under the age of 18, 9.4% from 18 to 24, 31.3% from 25 to 44, 25.0% from 45 to 64, and 7.3% who were 65 years of age or older. The median age was 31 years. For every 100 females, there were 95.9 males. For every 100 females age 18 and over, there were 84.2 males.

The median income for a household in the town was $53,214, and the median income for a family was $57,500. Males had a median income of $38,250 versus $23,333 for females. The per capita income for the town was $20,315. There were no families and 2.1% of the population living below the poverty line, including no under eighteens and none of those over 64.

== Education ==
Yeoman has a public library, a branch of the Delphi Public Library.
