= Rock Creek Township, Carroll County, Indiana =

Township in Indiana, United States

Rock Creek Township
- Township
- Location of Rock Creek Township in Carroll County
- Coordinates: 40°39′51″N 86°35′09″W
- Country: United States
- State: Indiana
- County: Carroll

Government
  - Type: Indiana township

Area
  - Total: 13.79 sq mi (35.7 km^{2})
  - Land: 13.5 sq mi (35 km^{2})
  - Water: 0.29 sq mi (0.75 km^{2})
- Elevation: 646 ft (197 m)

Population (2020)
  - Total: 447
  - Density: 33.1/sq mi (12.8/km^{2})
- FIPS code: 18-65268
- GNIS feature ID: 453809

Rock Creek Township is one of fourteen townships in Carroll County, Indiana. As of the 2020 census, its population was 447 (down from 475 at 2010) and it contained 186 housing units.

== History ==
Rock Creek Township was organized in 1828.

District School No. 3 at Rockfield was listed on the National Register of Historic Places in 1988.

== Geography ==
According to the 2010 census, the township has a total area of 13.79 square miles (35.7 km^{2}), of which 13.5 square miles (35 km^{2}) (or 97.90%) is land and 0.29 square miles (0.75 km^{2}) (or 2.10%) is water.

=== Unincorporated towns ===
- Rockfield

=== Adjacent townships ===
- Liberty (east)
- Jackson (southeast)
- Deer Creek (southwest)
- Tippecanoe (west)
- Adams (northwest)

=== Major highways ===
- Indiana State Road 25

=== Cemeteries ===
The township contains four cemeteries: Brown, Independent Order of Odd Fellows, Mullendore and Parks.

== Education ==
Rock Creek Township residents may obtain a library card at the Delphi Public Library in Delphi.
