= Monroe Township, Carroll County, Indiana =

Monroe Township
- Township
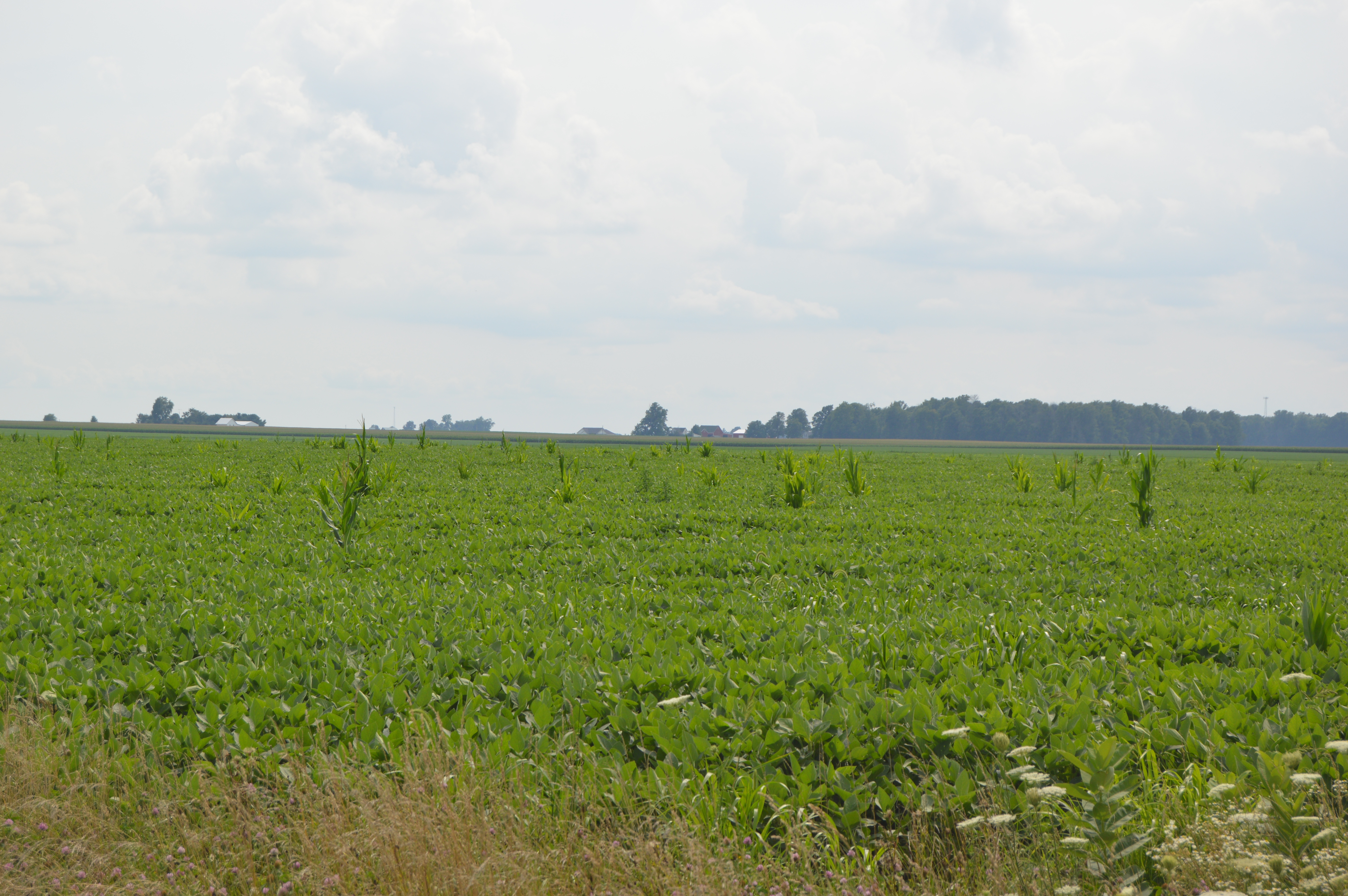
- Fields west of Flora

- Location of Monroe Township in Carroll County
- Coordinates: 40°32′01″N 86°31′30″W
- Country: United States
- State: Indiana
- County: Carroll

Government
  - Type: Indiana township

Area
  - Total: 24.06 sq mi (62.3 km^{2})
  - Land: 24.04 sq mi (62.3 km^{2})
  - Water: 0.02 sq mi (0.052 km^{2})
- Elevation: 709 ft (216 m)

Population (2020)
  - Total: 2,863
  - Density: 119.1/sq mi (45.98/km^{2})
- FIPS code: 18-50256
- GNIS feature ID: 453635

Monroe Township is one of fourteen townships in Carroll County, Indiana. As of the 2020 census, its population was 2,863 (up from 2,797 at 2010) and it contained 1,287 housing units.

== History ==
Monroe Township was organized in 1840.

== Geography ==
According to the 2010 census, the township has a total area of 24.06 square miles (62.3 km^{2}), of which 24.04 square miles (62.3 km^{2}) (or 99.92%) is land and 0.02 square miles (0.052 km^{2}) (or 0.08%) is water.

=== Cities and towns ===
- Flora

=== Unincorporated towns ===
- Bringhurst

=== Adjacent townships ===
- Jackson (north)
- Carrollton (east)
- Burlington (southeast)
- Democrat (south)
- Madison (west)
- Deer Creek (northwest)

=== Major highways ===
- Indiana State Road 18
- Indiana State Road 75

=== Cemeteries ===
The township contains three cemeteries: Maple Lawn, Moss, and Shirar Landis.

== Education ==
Monroe Township residents may obtain a library card at the Flora-Monroe Township Public Library in Flora.
