= Wheeling, Carroll County, Indiana =

Wheeling
- Unincorporated community
- Carroll County's location in Indiana

- Location in Carroll County
- Coordinates: 40°33′58″N 86°23′30″W
- Country: United States
- State: Indiana
- County: Carroll
- Township: Carrollton
- Elevation: 742 ft (226 m)
- ZIP code: 46929
- FIPS code: 18-83618
- GNIS feature ID: 445896

Wheeling is an unincorporated community in Carrollton Township, Carroll County, Indiana. It is part of the Lafayette, Indiana Metropolitan Statistical Area.

== History ==
In Wheeling there existed a post office from the 1830s until the 1930s, under the name Carroll.
