= Indiana State Road 213 =

State highway in Indiana, United States

State Road 213
- SR 213 highlighted in red

Route information
- Maintained by INDOT
- Length: 24.968 mi (40.182 km)

Major junctions
- South end: SR 37 near Noblesville
- North end: US 35 / SR 22 at Greentown

Location
- Country: United States
- State: Indiana
- Counties: Hamilton, Tipton, Howard

Highway system
- Indiana State Highway System; Interstate; US; State; Scenic
← SR 212	→ SR 218

State Road 213 in the U.S. state of Indiana is a short north–south state highway in the eastern portion of Indiana.

== Route description ==
The southern terminus of State Road 213 is near Noblesville at State Road 37. Going north, it parallels the route of State Road 19 which runs a few miles to the west. It crosses State Road 28 east of Tipton, then passes through the town of Windfall, and crosses State Road 26 before terminating at U.S. Route 35 in Greentown.

== History ==
SR 213 was first designated in 1932 along the modern route of SR 13 from south of North Manchester north to SR 114. Between 1939 and 1941 SR 13 became SR 37 in Hamilton County and the modern route of SR 37 opened to traffic. At this time SR 213 was commissioned along its modern route from SR 37 to SR 18. The segment north of US 35/SR 22 was removed between 1942 and 1945. The segment near North Manchester became part of SR 13 between 1947 and 1948, removing SR 213 in that area. The highway was paved between SR 37 and Omega between 1956 and 1957. The segment of road between SR 28 and Greentown was paved between 1966 and 1967. The final segment of road was paved by 1968.

== Major intersections ==
County	Location	mi	km	Destinations	Notes
Hamilton	White River Township	0.000	0.000	SR 37 – Noblesville	Southern terminus of SR 213
Tipton	Madison Township	11.679	18.796	SR 28 – Tipton, Elwood	
Howard	Union Township	21.022	33.832	SR 26 – Russiaville, Point Isabel	
Howard	Greentown	24.968	40.182	US 35 / SR 19 / SR 22	Northern terminus of SR 213
1.000 mi = 1.609 km; 1.000 km = 0.621 mi
