= Carrollton, Carroll County, Indiana =

Carrollton
- Unincorporated community
- Carroll County's location in Indiana

- Location in Carroll County
- Coordinates: 40°31′04″N 86°23′31″W
- Country: United States
- State: Indiana
- County: Carroll
- Township: Burlington
- Elevation: 781 ft (238 m)
- ZIP code: 46913
- FIPS code: 18-10522
- GNIS feature ID: 432178

Carrollton is an unincorporated community in Burlington Township, Carroll County, Indiana.

== History ==
A post office was established in Carrollton in 1838, but it closed one year later, in 1839.

== Education ==
Carrollton residents may obtain a library card at the Burlington Community Library in Burlington.
