= Paul S. Dunkin =

- Born: September 28, 1905; Flora, Indiana, US
- Died: August 25, 1975 (aged 69); Indianapolis, Indiana, US
- Education: DePauw University, University of Illinois
- Awards: Margaret Mann Citation (1968)

Paul Shaner Dunkin (September 28, 1905 – August 25, 1975) was an American writer, librarian and professor. He was known in the field of librarianship for his philosophies and critiques of, as well as his witticism over cataloging. Subsequently, Dunkin was named one of the top "100 of the Most Important Leaders [of Library Science] in the 20th Century."

== Education ==
Paul Shaner Dunkin, who originally hailed from Flora, Indiana, performed his undergraduate studies at DePauw University, outside of Indianapolis. In 1929 he received an A.B. and was nominated Phi Beta Kappa. Dunkin went on to an eight-year stint at the University of Illinois, beginning as a student and graduate assistant in Classics. After two years, Dunkin completed the M.A. and moved on to doctoral studies. During this period Dunkin was influenced by one of his professors, William Oldfather, to take up the study of Library Science. By way of this suggestion, he earned a B.S. in Library Science in 1935 and was soon hired as a cataloger for the University of Illinois Library. Dunkin completed his PhD in classics two years later in 1937.

== Career ==
In the same year he earned a PhD in Classics, Dunkin found employment as the senior cataloger at the Folger Shakespeare Library in Washington, D.C. Thirteen years later, in 1950, he was promoted to chief of technical services. It was at this time Dunkin first began to publish work on the topic of cataloging. He held the technical services position at the Folger for another decade before moving on.

At age 54, Dunkin returned to the scholarly fold as a professor at Rutgers' Graduate School of Library Services. During his tenure at Rutgers, Dunkin's writing flourished in the form of regular publication by professional journals. This can be partially attributed to the fact that Dunkin worked as the editor of D.C. Libraries 1953 to 1955 and assistant editor of the peer-reviewed journal Library Resources & Technical Services in 1957. LRTS stands as the official publication of the Association for Library Collections and Technical Services, an arm of the American Library Association. Dunkin was also involved in the District of Columbia Library Association, the Catalog Code Revision Committee, the Cataloging Policy and Research Committee and the ALA Council.

In 1964 Dunkin served as president of the Resources and Technical Services Division of the ALA. With the passing of LRTS' founding editor Esther Piercy in 1967, he jumped into her shoes. Perhaps greater than the two previous accomplishments Dunkin's award of the 1968 Margaret Mann Citation in Cataloging and Classification. The citation proclaims:

An innovative practitioner, stimulating teacher, chronicler and critic, author and editor, indefatigable committeeman, and elder statesman with a refreshingly young perspective, Dr. Dunkin has earned the respect of the entire library profession for his modestly-worn erudition, grace and wit.

Dunkin retired from the Journal and Rutgers in 1971. On his retirement, Dunkin was named Professor Emeritus at Rutgers. He moved back to Indianapolis, Indiana where he died August 25, 1975.

== Writings and commentary ==
In 1951 the ALA saw fit to publish Dunkin's How to Catalog a Rare Book, referred to as "…that regularly cited little pamphlet…" by his colleague Doralyn J. Hickey. In addition, according to Norman D. Stevens this document "…represents one of Dunkin's most useful contributions. It explains the fundamental aspects of how books are printed and put together in a way that is simple, authoritative, and easy to understand.

During the Chicago Graduate Library School Conference of 1956, Dunkin “Criticism of Current Cataloging Practice” made an impression and was later published within Toward a Better Cataloging Code. More notable though was Dunkin's ongoing criticism of Seymour Lubetzky's plan to revise the cataloging process. In fact, the published copy of Lubetzky's "Code of Cataloging Rules" contains a "Commentator's Epilogue" written by Dunkin. Of Lubeyzky's code, Dunkin blatantly claims, "…the new code's answers are not consistent." Dunkin goes on to pick at the national institution:

...We have become so accustomed to ALA preoccupation with the kinds of works and kinds of special problems and ALA insistence that there should be a special little answer for every kind of work and every special problem and that each answer should always follow (not a central theme but) the presumed convenience of the public in each particular case.

Beyond the Lubetzky debate, the 1960s offered many opportunities for Dunkin. One year after his appointment to assistant editor, he began the eight-year run of his "year's work" essay in the LRTS. That same year, Dunkin not only contributed to Paris for the 1961 International Conference on Cataloguing Principles, a presentation by the International Federation of Library Associations, but was so impressed upon that this conference added to the subject of future works. In addition, he had a regular column in Library Journal entitled "Viewpoints." Dunkin went on to publish Cataloging U.S.A. in 1969, a collection of his essays titled Tales of Melvil's Mouser; or Much Ado about Librarians, and a second edition of Rare Books in 1973. His final publication, Bibliography: Tiger or Fat Cat?, was released after his death in 1975.

== Published works ==
- How to Catalog a Rare Book (1951, 1973)
- Cataloging U.S.A. (1969)
- Tales of Melvil’s Mouser; or Much Ado about Librarians (1973)
- Bibliography: Tiger or Fat Cat? (1975)
