= Liberty Township, Carroll County, Indiana =

Liberty Township
- Township
- Location of Liberty Township in Carroll County
- Coordinates: 40°40′00″N 86°30′05″W
- Country: United States
- State: Indiana
- County: Carroll

Government
  - Type: Indiana township

Area
  - Total: 17.47 sq mi (45.2 km^{2})
  - Land: 17.41 sq mi (45.1 km^{2})
  - Water: 0.05 sq mi (0.13 km^{2})
- Elevation: 699 ft (213 m)

Population (2020)
  - Total: 403
  - Density: 23.1/sq mi (8.94/km^{2})
- FIPS code: 18-43200
- GNIS feature ID: 453550

Liberty Township is one of fourteen townships in Carroll County, Indiana. As of the 2020 census, its population was 403 (down from 440 at 2010) and it contained 181 housing units.

== Geography ==
According to the 2010 census, the township has a total area of 17.47 square miles (45.2 km^{2}), of which 17.41 square miles (45.1 km^{2}) (or 99.66%) is land and 0.05 square miles (0.13 km^{2}) (or 0.29%) is water.

=== Unincorporated towns ===
- Burrows
- Flax (extinct)

=== Adjacent townships ===
- Jefferson Township, Cass County (north)
- Clinton Township, Cass County (northeast)
- Washington (east)
- Jackson (south)
- Adams (west)
- Rock Creek (west)

=== Major highways ===
- Indiana State Road 25

=== Cemeteries ===
The township contains two cemeteries, Burrows and Woodville.
