= Indiana State Road 22 =

Highway in Indiana

State Road 22
- SR 22 highlighted in red

Route information
- Maintained by INDOT
- Length: 44.989 mi (72.403 km)
- Existed: October 1, 1926–present

Western segment
- Length: 11.496 mi (18.501 km)
- West end: SR 29 in Burlington
- East end: Malfalfa Road / County Road 300 West in Kokomo

Eastern segment
- Length: 33.493 mi (53.902 km)
- West end: US 31 / US 35 in Kokomo
- Major intersections: I-69 / US 35 near Gas City
- East end: SR 26 in Upland

Location
- Country: United States
- State: Indiana
- Counties: Carroll, Howard, Grant

Highway system
- Indiana State Highway System; Interstate; US; State; Scenic
← US 20	→ SR 23

State Road 22 (SR 22) is an east–west discontinuous state road in the central part of the US state of Indiana. The western end of the western segment is in the town of Burlington, at SR 29. The highway passes through rural areas of Carroll and Howard counties, before ending in Kokomo. The eastern segment begins at an interchange with U.S. Route 31 (US 31) and US 35, in Kokomo, and heads east passing through towns and cities like Greentown, Gas City and Upland, before ending at SR 26. The western segment of SR 22 is concurrent with US 35 from Kokomo to Interstate 69 (I-69). The entire road covers a distance of about 45 miles (72 km), passing through mostly rural areas.

The originally designated road along modern SR 22 was SR 35, running between Kokomo and SR 11 (now SR 9), with SR 22 being routed between SR 16 (now SR 62) and Indianapolis. In the mid-1920s the state of Indiana renumber its state road system and the SR 22 designated was moved to an alignment, between Illinois state line and US 52. In the early 1930s SR 22 was moved to its contemporary alignment, running between SR 29 and US 27 at the time. The concurrency with US 35 was added in the mid-1930s between Burlington and Jonesboro. In the late 1930s SR 22 was moved to a new alignment between Hartford City and the Ohio state line. The entire road was paved before the late 1960s. The road east of SR 26 was removed in the 1970s. Between 2014 and 2016, the Indiana Department of Transportation (INDOT) relinquished the road through Kokomo.

== Route description ==
=== Western segment ===
The western segment of SR 22 begins at an intersection between Michigan Street (SR 29) and 7th Street, in the town of Burlington. The street heads northeast, leaving Burlington, before bending to become east–west heading towards Kokomo. On its way to Kokomo SR 22 passes through rural Carroll and Howard counties before an intersection with Malfalfa Road. The SR 22 designation ends at this intersection but the roadway continues east towards downtown Kokomo as Sycamore Street.

=== Eastern segment ===
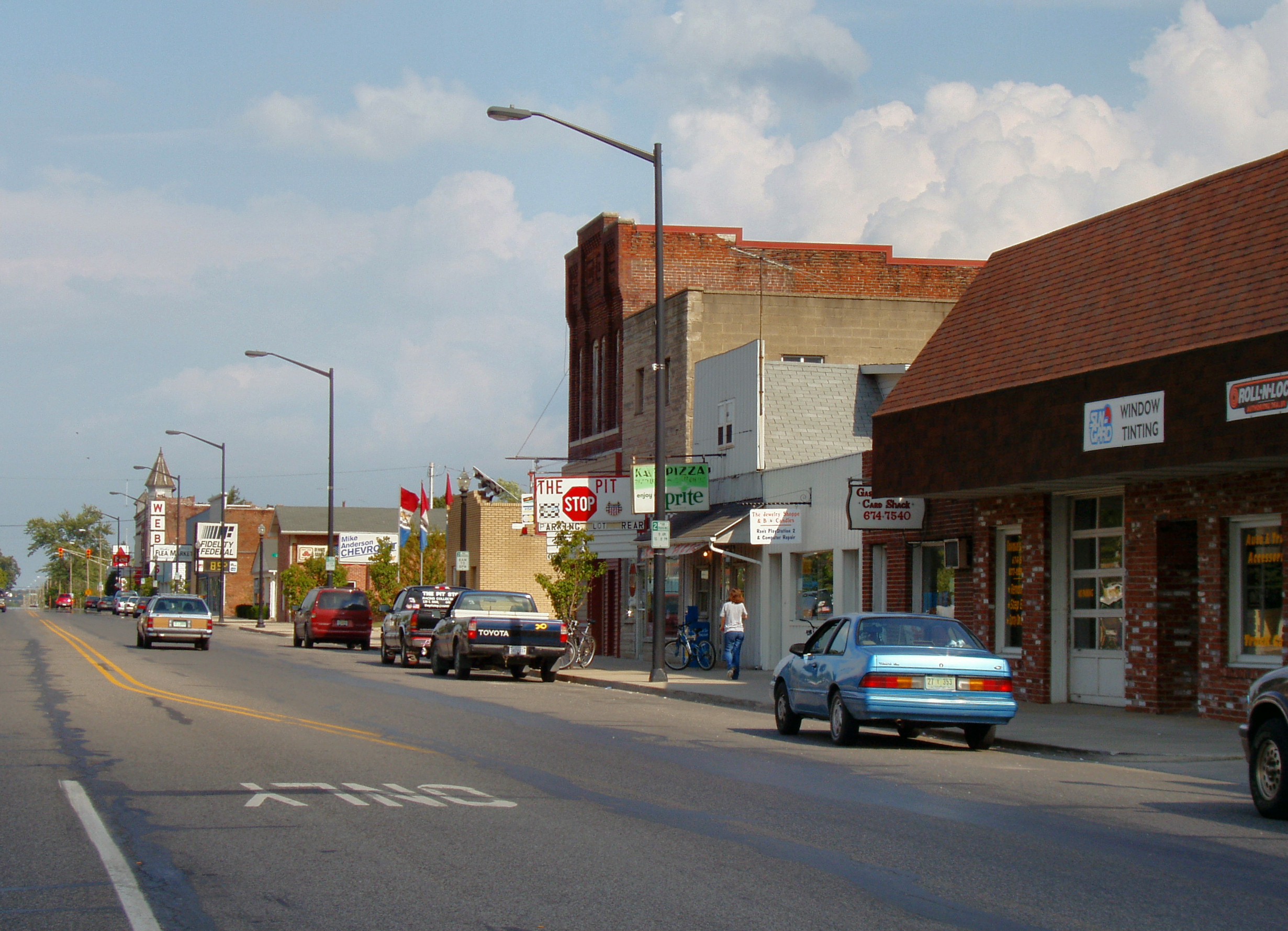
Gas City downtown.

The eastern segment of SR 22 begins at an intersection with US 31 and US 35 on the east side of Kokomo. SR 22 heads due east concurrent with US 35, passing through agriculture properties. The concurrency has an intersection with SR 19 at this intersection SR 19 heads east concurrent with US 35/SR 22. The highway enters Greentown passing through downtown before an intersection with the northern end of SR 213. East of Greentown the road has a four-way stop with SR 13, at this intersection SR 19 turns north concurrent with SR 13. Past SR 13 the road has an intersection with SR 37, southwest of the Marion Municipal Airport, before passing just south of the airport. The road has an intersection with SR 9, before curving northeast, passing just north of Jonesboro.

US 35 and SR 22 crosses over a Norfolk Southern railroad track before bending to become east–west and having an intersection with SR 15. East of SR 15 the concurrency cross over the Mississinewa River before entering Gas City, in Gas City US 35/SR 22 is concurrent with Main Street. East of the river Main Street cross a railroad track and enters downtown Gas City. East of downtown Main Street passes through residential properties becoming commercial properties. The road has an interchange with I-69, at this interchange US 35 turns south concurrent with I-69. Past I-69, SR 22 leaves Gas City entering rural Grant County, passing farms and fields. The road has an intersection with the southern end of SR 5 before curving to become north–south and entering Upland. In Upland SR 22 is on Main Street, passing through mostly commercial properties. Main Street crosses over a railroad track, passing houses before passing on the east side of Taylor University. SR 22 end at an intersection with SR 26 on the southeast corner of the university.

== History ==
Prior to 1926 SR 22 was on an alignment between SR 16, now SR 62, and Indianapolis, passing through Bloomington. At this time SR 35 was routed along modern SR 22 from Kokomo to SR 11, now SR 9, while the segment of SR 22 in Jay County was part of SR 23. SR 23 went between Pennville and US 27 between Portland and Bryant. In 1926 SR 22 was proposed between the Illinois state line and US 41 in Boswell, while SR 22 was commissioned between US 41 and US 52 along the modern route of SR 352. The route of modern SR 22 between Kokomo and SR 9 became part of SR 18, while the section of SR 22 in Jay County also became part of SR 18. SR 22 was commissioned from the Illinois state line to US 41, along modern SR 26, between 1928 and 1929.

Many changes to the SR 22 designation happen in 1931 the first being SR 22 between Illinois state line and US 41 became part of SR 26, while the segment of road from US 41 and US 52 became SR 152. SR 22 was proposed between SR 25 near Lafayette and SR 29. The final changes in 1931 was SR 22 was designated between SR 29 and US 27. The proposed section of SR 22 west of SR 29 was removed from any proposals between late 1932 and 1933. US 35 was commissioned to follow SR 22 from SR 29 to Gas City between 1934 and 1935. In either 1938 or 1939 SR 22 from Hartford to Pennville was moved north onto a new road to the state road system. At this time SR 22 was added between US 27 and the Ohio state line, connecting to Ohio State Route 219. The concurrency with US 35, between SR 29 and Kokomo, was removed in between 1939 and 1941. The last section of SR 22 to be paved was the section in eastern Blackford County, being paved in either 1969 or 1970.

The eastern terminus of SR 22 was moved from the Ohio state line to SR 26 near Upland, removing SR 22 from Blackford and Jay counties, between 1976 and 1977. The former route of SR 22 in Blackford and Jay counties became county roads. On June 27, 2014, INDOT stated that "pending contract approval" they would transfer 5.8 miles of SR 22 to the city of Kokomo, from the western city limits to the US 31/35 interchange which opened in 2013. This gap in SR 22 was first noted in INDOT's 2016 Reference Post Book.

== Major intersections ==
County	Location	mi	km	Destinations	Notes
Carroll	Burlington	0.000	0.000	SR 29	Western terminus of SR 22
Howard	Kokomo	11.496	18.501	Malfalfa Road / County Road 300 West	Kokomo city limits
Gap in route
Howard	Kokomo	17.086	27.497	US 31 / US 35 north – Indianapolis, South Bend	Western end of US 35 concurrency
Howard	Taylor Township	19.722	31.739	SR 19 south	Western end of SR 19 concurrency
Howard	Greentown	23.514	37.842	SR 213 south	Northern terminus of SR 213
Grant	Sims Township	30.557	49.177	SR 13 / SR 19 north – Elwood, Swayzee, Wabash	Eastern end of SR 19 concurrency
Grant	Marion	37.476	60.312	SR 37 – Elwood, Marion	
Grant	Marion	38.564	62.063	SR 9 – Anderson, Marion	
Grant	Jonesboro	41.102	66.147	SR 15 north – Indiana Wesleyan University	Southern terminus of SR 15
Grant	Gas City	45.802– 45.868	73.711– 73.817	I-69 / US 35 south – Indianapolis, Fort Wayne	Eastern end of US 35 concurrency
Grant	Upland	48.278	77.696	SR 5 north – Van Buren	Southern terminus of SR 5
Grant	Upland	50.579	81.399	SR 26 – Hartford City	Eastern terminus of SR 22
1.000 mi = 1.609 km; 1.000 km = 0.621 mi: Concurrency terminus
