= Winamac Southern Railway =

Short-line railroad in Indiana

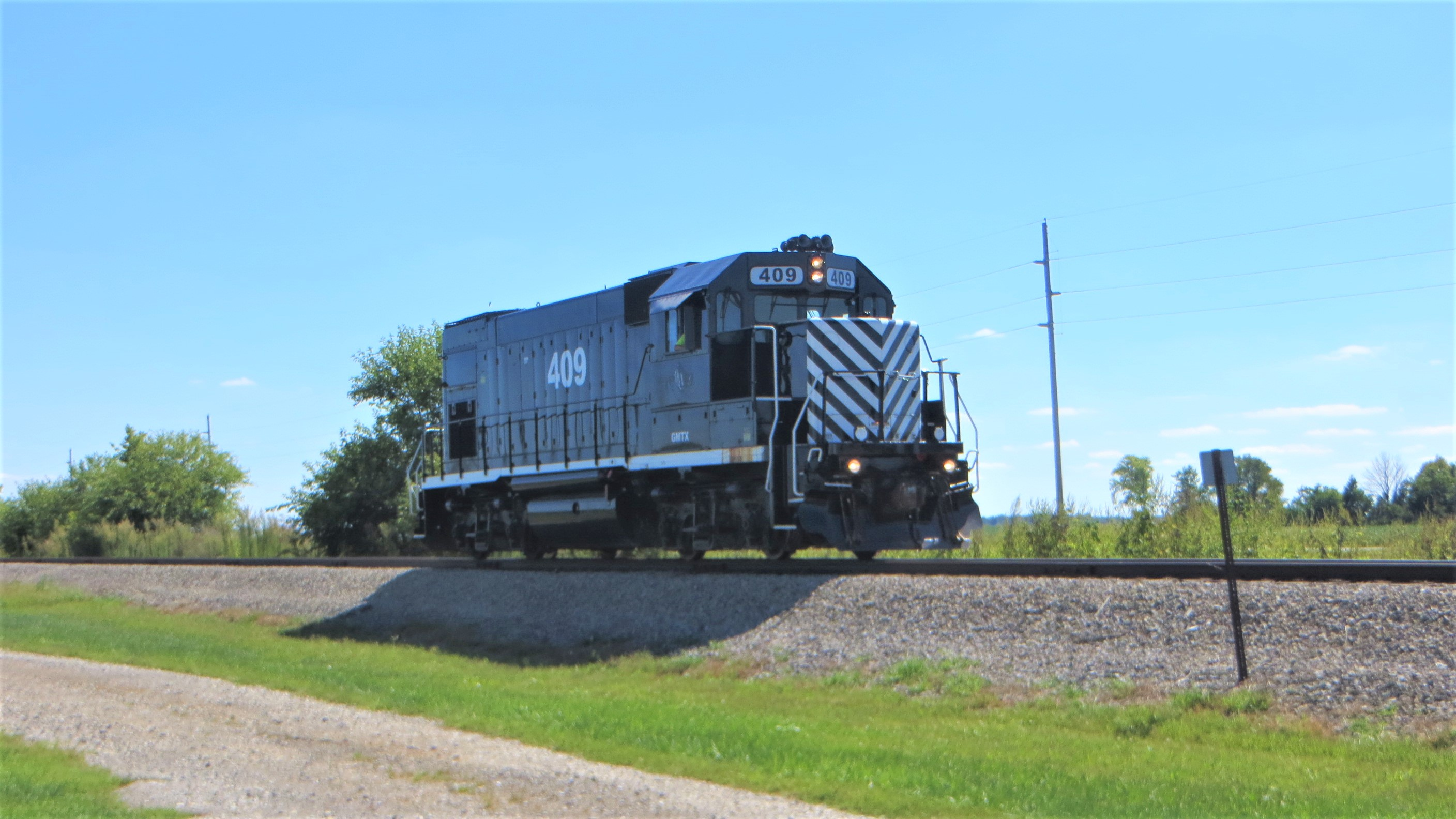
- EMD GP15-1 No. 409, leased from GATX Rail, traveling light on Winamac Southern trackage near Walton, Indiana

Overview
- Headquarters: Kokomo, Indiana
- Reporting mark: WSRY
- Locale: Northern Indiana
- Dates of operation: 1993–

Technical
- Track gauge: 4 ft 8 1/2 in (1,435 mm) standard gauge

The Winamac Southern Railway (reporting mark WSRY) is a short-line railroad in northern Indiana, United States, operated under lease by the Toledo, Peoria and Western Railway. It owns two lines radiating from Logansport to Kokomo and Bringhurst, and formerly a third to Winamac, all former Pennsylvania Railroad lines acquired from Conrail in 1993. It hauls mainly outbound grain and inbound agricultural supplies, connecting with the Toledo, Peoria and Western Railway at Logansport and with the Central Railroad of Indianapolis at Kokomo. Until 2009, the Central Railroad of Indianapolis (a RailAmerica subsidiary) operated the company as agent.

== History ==
As the Pennsylvania Railroad assembled its system in northern Indiana, Logansport became a major hub, with seven lines radiating in all directions (the only other service to the city was a line of the Wabash Railroad, now Norfolk Southern Railway). Conrail took over four of these in 1976, and abandoned the line to Marion in the 1980s. The remaining lines to Winamac, Kokomo, and Bringhurst, known as the "Logansport Cluster", were spun off to the Winamac Southern, which began operations in March 1993. The new railroad was controlled by Daniel R. Frick of Frick Services, a storage and handling company, who also owned J.K. Line, Inc. to the north.

In September 1995, Winamac Southern sold the line from Winamac to the yard at 18th Street in Logansport to A&R Line, Inc., another new shortline owned by Frick, which was operated by J.K. Line employees using a locomotive leased from that company. Winamac Southern retained trackage rights through Logansport, in order to connect its Bringhurst and Kokomo lines. Subsequently, the Central Railroad of Indianapolis (CERA), which serves Kokomo, began operating the remaining Winamac Southern lines as agent.

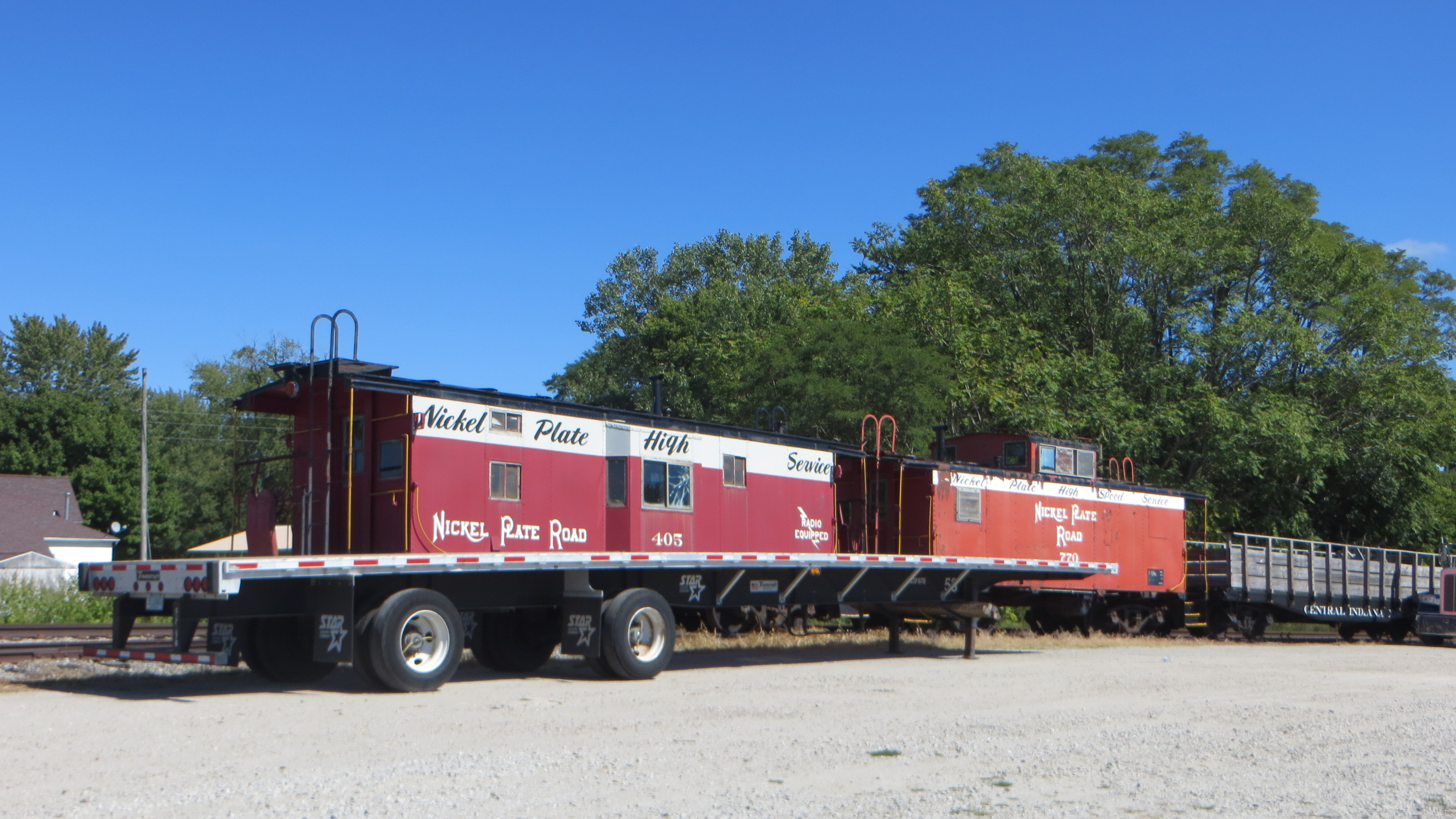
Winamac Southern cabooses in Lincoln, Indiana.

The arrangement between Winamac Southern and CERA was to end at the end of 2008, and the U S Rail Corporation filed with the Surface Transportation Board to lease and operate the Winamac Southern, as well as a CERA-operated segment near Kokomo owned by the Kokomo Grain Company. However, the parties discovered that the trackage rights over A&R, which had since been merged into the Toledo, Peoria and Western Railway, had never been authorized, and concurrently filed for approval of the 1995 agreement. The STB rejected the latter notice of exemption, citing the opposition of the TP&W to continuance of trackage rights, thus requiring a more extensive proceeding. U S Rail began operating the Winamac Southern as its Kokomo Division in early 2009.

As of 2019, WSRY is operated by Toledo, Peoria and Western Railway (TPW).
