= Washington Township, Carroll County, Indiana =

Washington Township
- Township
- Location of Washington Township in Carroll County
- Coordinates: 40°39′08″N 86°25′13″W
- Country: United States
- State: Indiana
- County: Carroll

Government
  - Type: Indiana township

Area
  - Total: 29.84 sq mi (77.3 km^{2})
  - Land: 29.83 sq mi (77.3 km^{2})
  - Water: 0.01 sq mi (0.026 km^{2})
- Elevation: 699 ft (213 m)

Population (2020)
  - Total: 551
  - Density: 18.5/sq mi (7.13/km^{2})
- FIPS code: 18-80414
- GNIS feature ID: 453985

Washington Township is one of fourteen townships in Carroll County, Indiana. As of the 2020 census, its population was 551 (slightly up from 549 at 2010) and it contained 297 housing units.

== History ==
Washington Township was organized in 1835.

== Geography ==
According to the 2010 census, the township has a total area of 29.84 square miles (77.3 km^{2}), of which 29.83 square miles (77.3 km^{2}) (or 99.97%) is land and 0.01 square miles (0.026 km^{2}) (or 0.03%) is water.

=== Unincorporated towns ===
- Deer Creek

=== Adjacent townships ===
- Washington Township, Cass County (northeast)
- Deer Creek Township, Cass County (southeast)
- Carrollton (south)
- Jackson (southwest)
- Liberty (west)
- Clinton Township, Cass County (northwest)

=== Major highways ===
- Indiana State Road 29
- Indiana State Road 218

=== Cemeteries ===
The township contains two cemeteries: Hopewell and Rock Creek.
