= Jefferson Township, Carroll County, Indiana =

Jefferson Township
- Township
- Location of Jefferson Township in Carroll County
- Coordinates: 40°41′45″N 86°42′40″W
- Country: United States
- State: Indiana
- County: Carroll

Government
  - Type: Indiana township

Area
  - Total: 31.7 sq mi (82 km^{2})
  - Land: 30.67 sq mi (79.4 km^{2})
  - Water: 1.03 sq mi (2.7 km^{2})
- Elevation: 673 ft (205 m)

Population (2020)
  - Total: 2,275
  - Density: 74.18/sq mi (28.64/km^{2})
- FIPS code: 18-37872
- GNIS feature ID: 453480

Jefferson Township is one of fourteen townships in Carroll County, Indiana. As of the 2020 census, its population was 2,275 (up from 2,162 at 2010) and it contained 1,648 housing units.

== History ==
Jefferson Township was organized in 1836.

== Geography ==
According to the 2010 census, the township has a total area of 31.7 square miles (82 km^{2}), of which 30.67 square miles (79.4 km^{2}) (or 96.75%) is land and 1.03 square miles (2.7 km^{2}) (or 3.25%) is water.

=== Cities and towns ===
- Yeoman

=== Unincorporated towns ===
- Breezy Point
- C and C Beach
- Lower Sunset Park
- Patton
- Roth Park
- Sandy Beach
- Scarlet Oaks
- Terrace Bay
- Upper Sunset Park
- Walnut Gardens

(This list is based on USGS data and may include former settlements.)

=== Adjacent townships ===
- Lincoln Township, White County (northeast)
- Adams (east)
- Tippecanoe (south)
- Prairie Township, White County (southwest)
- Big Creek Township, White County (west)
- Union Township, White County (northwest)

=== Major highways ===
- U.S. Route 421

=== Cemeteries ===
The township contains three cemeteries: Hickory Grove, Schock and Yeoman.

== Education ==
Jefferson Township residents may obtain a library card at the Delphi Public Library in Delphi.
