= Pittsburg, Indiana =

Pittsburg
- Unincorporated community and Census-designated place
- Carroll County's location in Indiana

- Location in Carroll County
- Coordinates: 40°35′39″N 86°42′12″W
- Country: United States
- State: Indiana
- County: Carroll
- Township: Tippecanoe
- Elevation: 600 ft (180 m)
- ZIP code: 46923
- FIPS code: 18-60210
- GNIS feature ID: 2830325

Pittsburg is an unincorporated community in Tippecanoe Township, Carroll County, Indiana. It is part of the Lafayette, Indiana Metropolitan Statistical Area.

== History ==
Pittsburg was laid out in 1836. A post office was established at Pittsburg in 1838, and remained in operation until it was discontinued in 1915. The name of the post office was officially spelled Pittsburgh until 1894.

It was likely named after Pittsburgh, Pennsylvania.

== Geography ==
Pittsburg is located on the west side of the Wabash River across from the town of Delphi. U.S. Route 421/State Road 39 passes through town on Monroe Street.

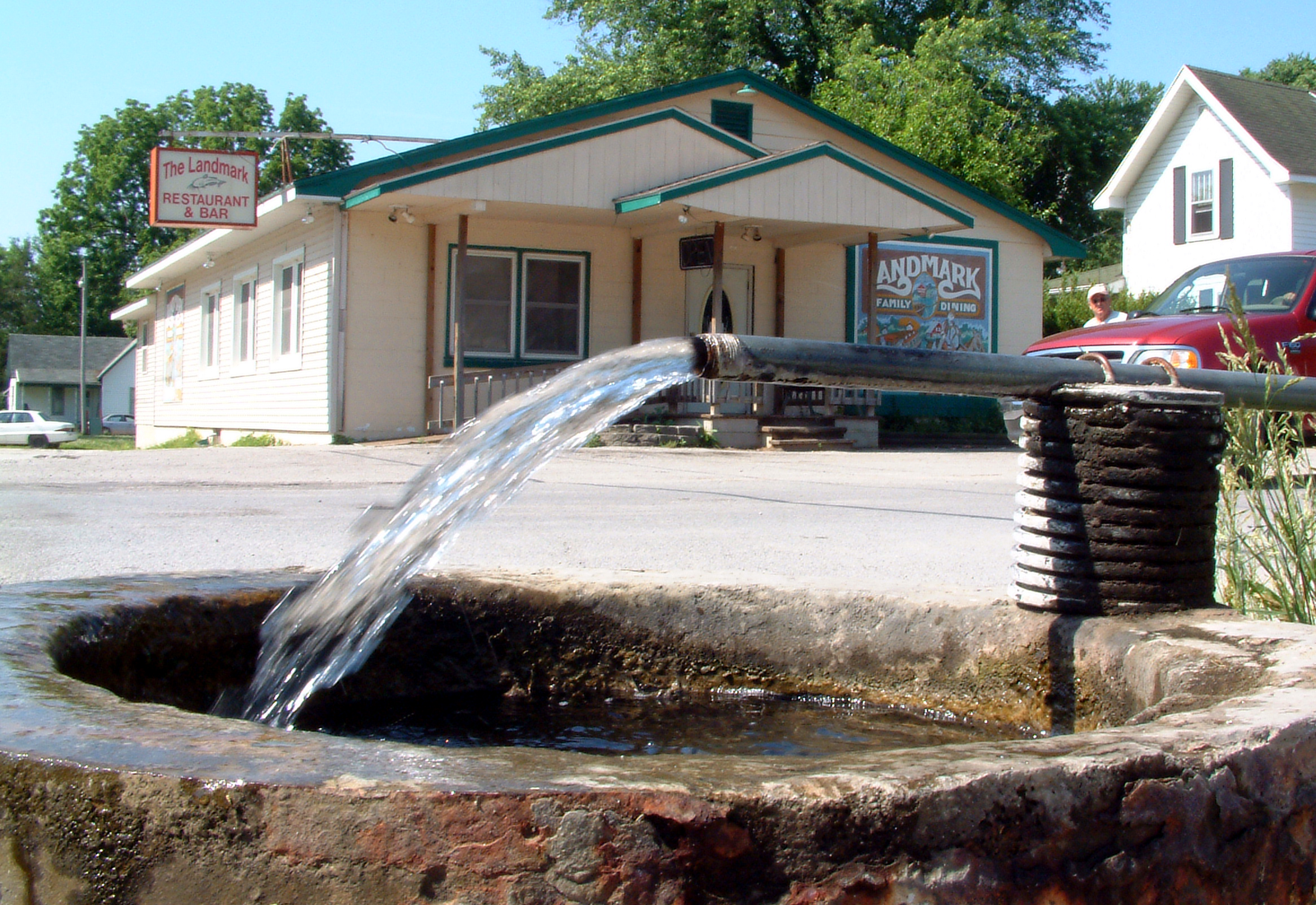
The corner of Washington and Howard.

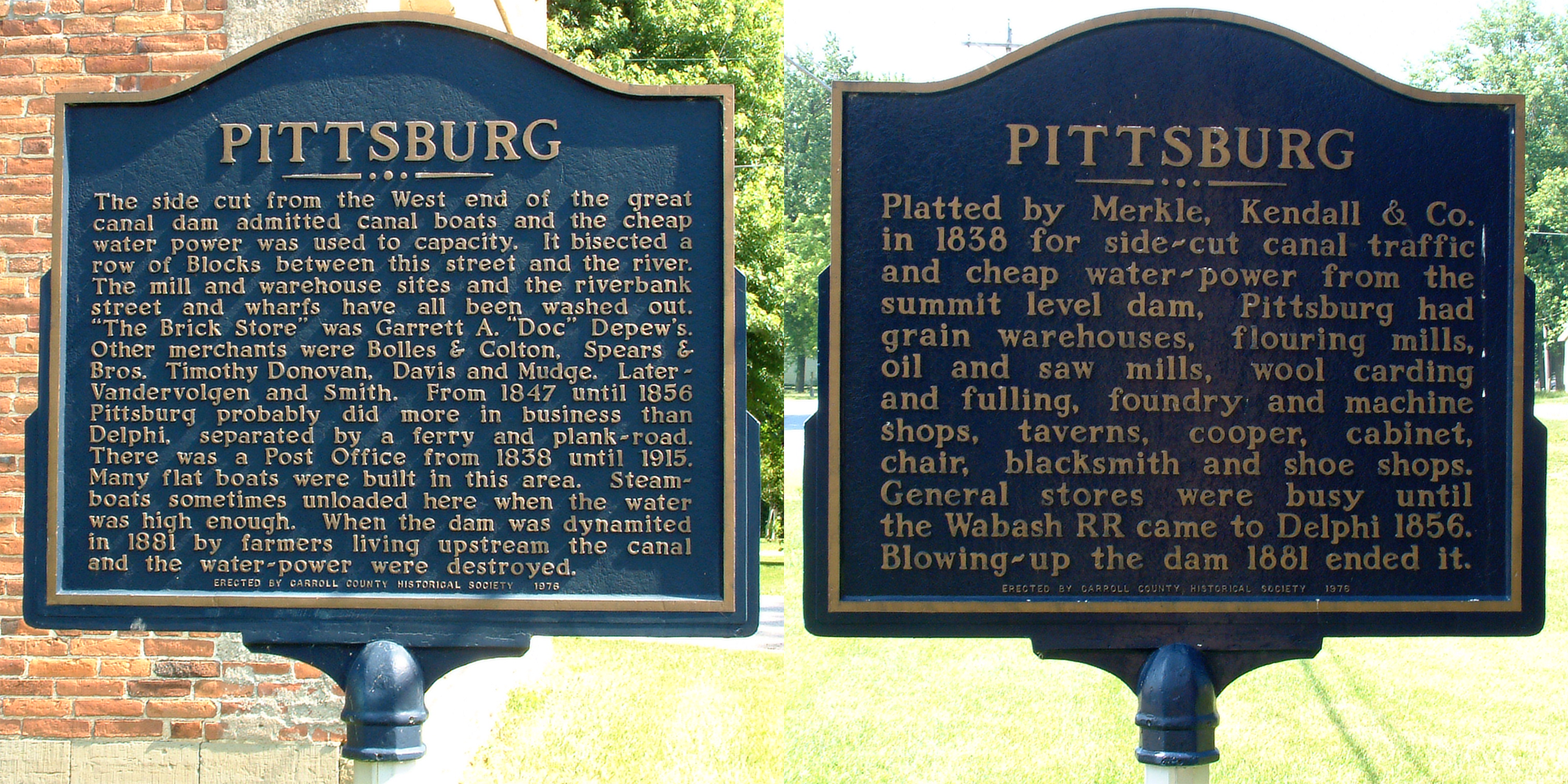
The town's historical marker.

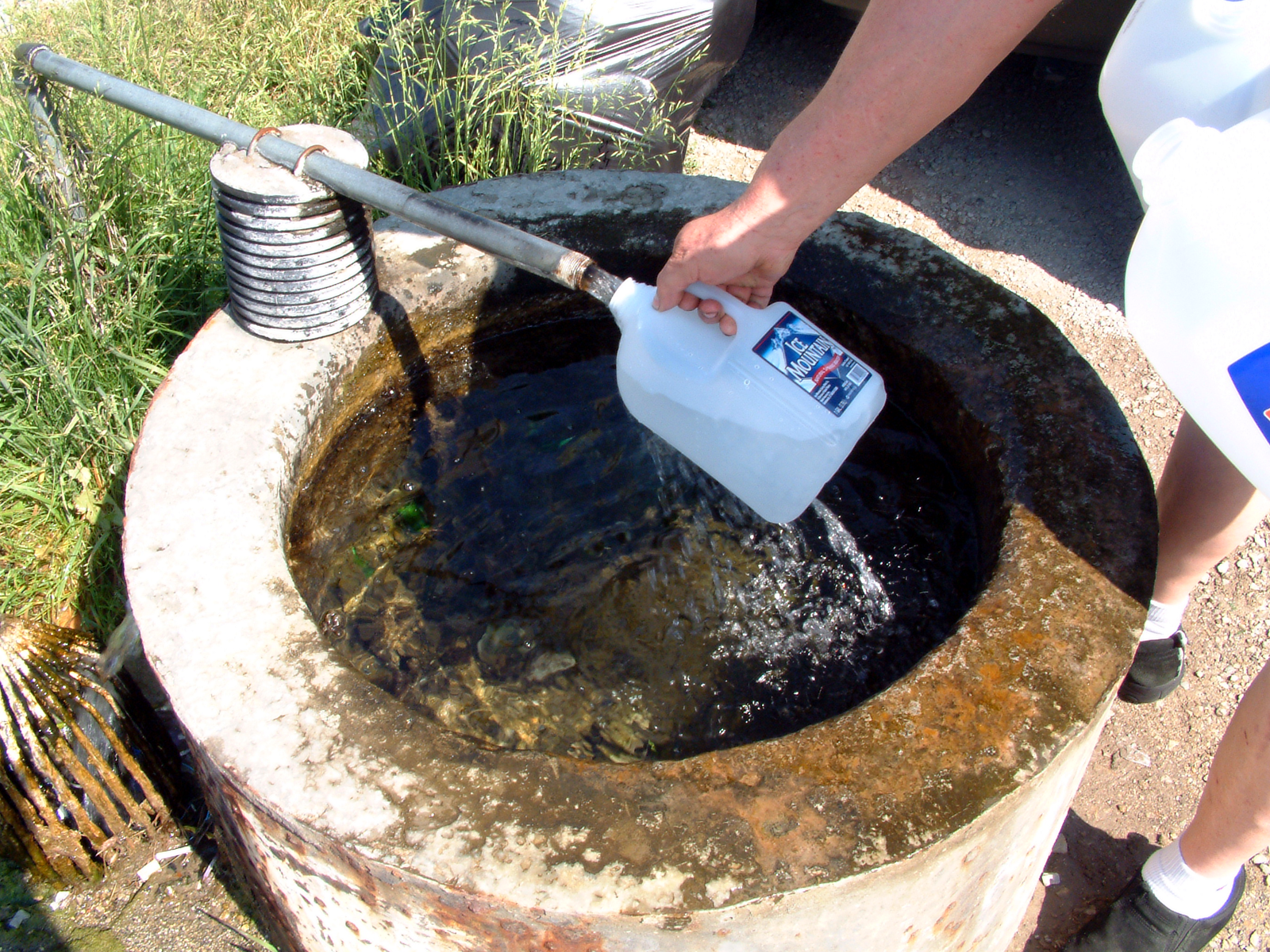
Pittsburg's spring.

== Demographics ==
The United States Census Bureau defined Pittsburg as a census designated place in the 2022 American Community Survey.
