= Jackson Township, Carroll County, Indiana =

Jackson Township
- Township
- Location of Jackson Township in Carroll County
- Coordinates: 40°35′50″N 86°31′43″W
- Country: United States
- State: Indiana
- County: Carroll

Government
  - Type: Indiana township

Area
  - Total: 30.11 sq mi (78.0 km^{2})
  - Land: 30.1 sq mi (78 km^{2})
  - Water: 0.01 sq mi (0.026 km^{2})
- Elevation: 620 ft (189 m)

Population (2020)
  - Total: 1,387
  - Density: 46.1/sq mi (17.8/km^{2})
- FIPS code: 18-36828
- GNIS feature ID: 453434

Jackson Township is one of fourteen townships in Carroll County, Indiana. As of the 2020 census, its population was 1,387 (slightly down from 1,391 at 2010) and it contained 523 housing units.

It is uncertain how or for whom the township was named, but Adam Porter, one of the township's earliest settlers who arrived in the late 1820s, is described as hailing from Jackson Township, Virginia, and may have named it.

== History ==
Jackson Township was organized in 1830.

== Geography ==
According to the 2010 census, the township has a total area of 30.11 square miles (78.0 km^{2}), of which 30.1 square miles (78 km^{2}) (or 99.97%) is land and 0.01 square miles (0.026 km^{2}) (or 0.03%) is water.

=== Cities and towns ===
- Camden

=== Adjacent townships ===
- Liberty (north)
- Washington (northeast)
- Carrollton (east)
- Monroe (south)
- Deer Creek (west)
- Rock Creek (northwest)

=== Major highways ===
- Indiana State Road 75
- Indiana State Road 218

=== Cemeteries ===
The township contains four cemeteries: Musselman, Nebo, Nettle and Wise.
