= Rockfield, Indiana =

Rockfield
- Unincorporated community and Census-designated place
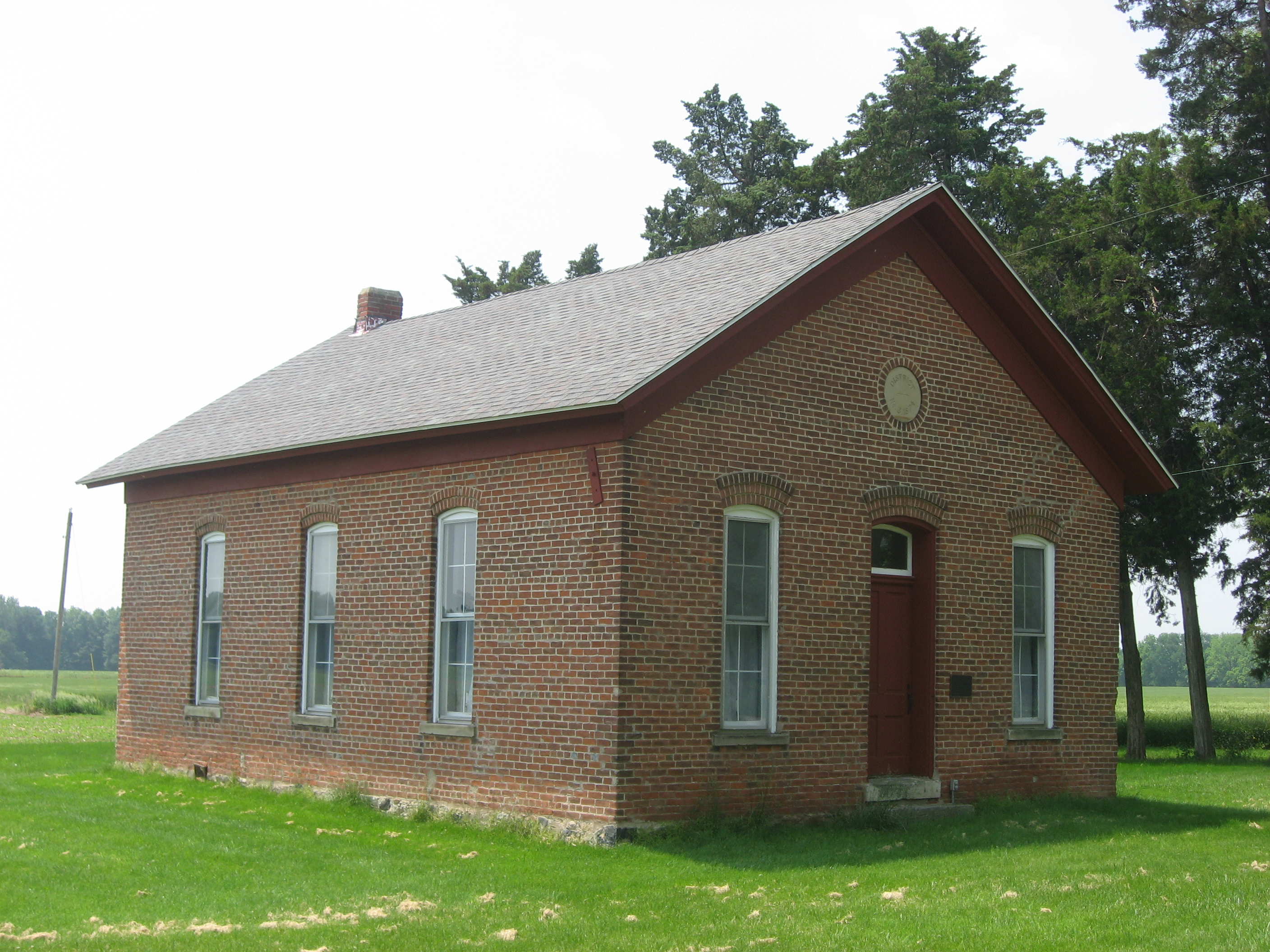
- Historic District School No. 3

- Carroll County's location in Indiana

- Location in Carroll County
- Coordinates: 40°38′30″N 86°34′23″W
- Country: United States
- State: Indiana
- County: Carroll
- Township: Rock Creek

Area
  - Total: 0.37 sq mi (0.96 km^{2})
  - Land: 0.37 sq mi (0.96 km^{2})
  - Water: 0 sq mi (0.00 km^{2})
- Elevation: 699 ft (213 m)

Population (2020)
  - Total: 211
  - Density: 567.9/sq mi (219.26/km^{2})
- ZIP code: 46923
- GNIS feature ID: 2806556

Rockfield is an unincorporated community in Rock Creek Township, Carroll County, Indiana. It is part of the Lafayette, Indiana Metropolitan Statistical Area. As of the 2020 census, Rockfield had a population of 211.

== History ==
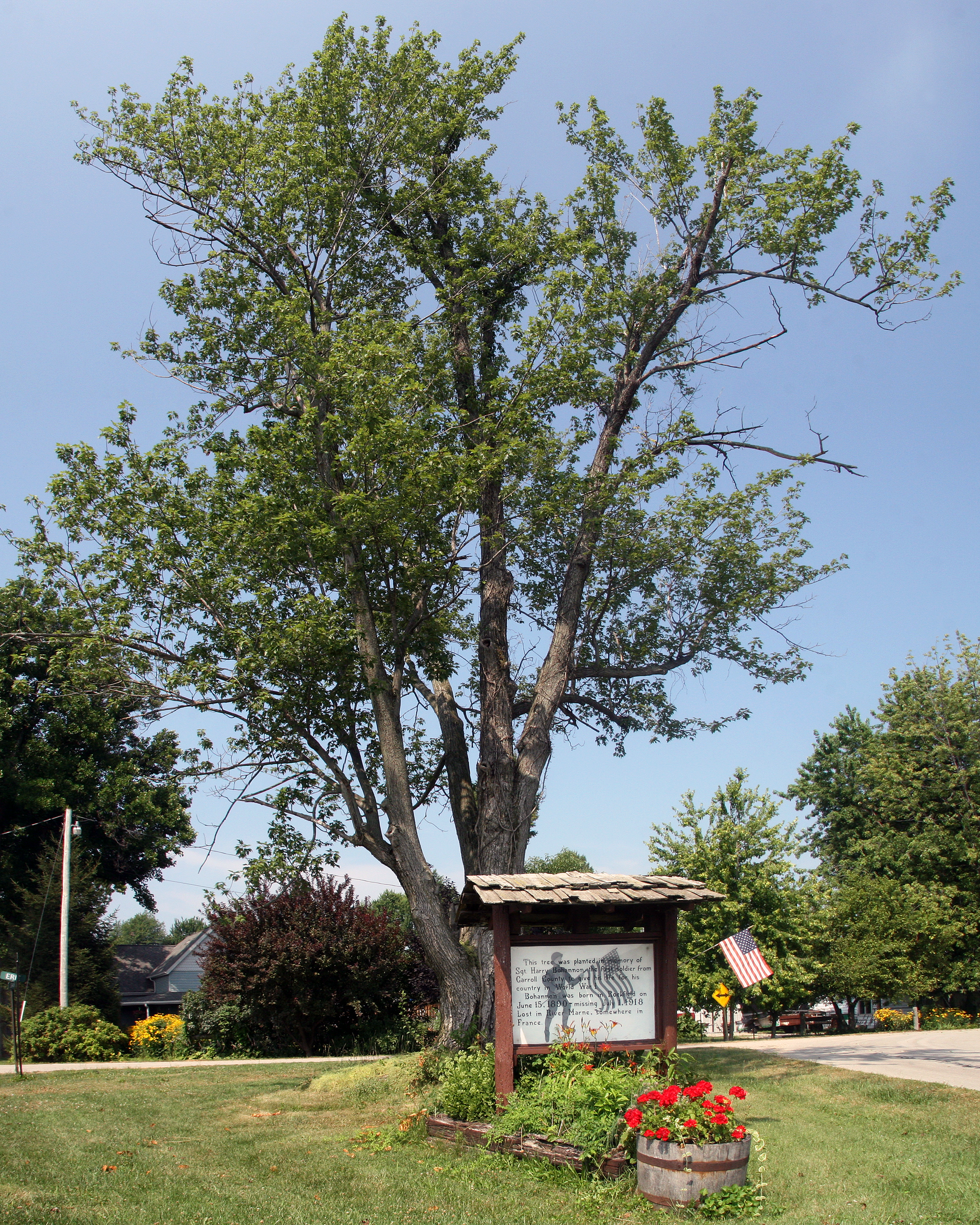
Memorial to a World War I soldier at the corner of Erie Street and Rockfield Road.

Rockfield was platted in 1856. The Rockfield post office was established in 1857. District School No. 3 was listed on the National Register of Historic Places in 1988.

== Geography ==
Rockfield is located in open farm land south of Rock Creek. A portion of old Indiana State Road 25 and the Norfolk Southern Railway both pass northeast through town. New Indiana State Road 25, the Hoosier Heartland Highway, bypasses town on the northwest.

== Demographics ==
Historical population
| Census | Pop. | Note | %± |
|---|---|---|---|
| 2020 | 211 | | — |
U.S. Decennial Census
