= Madison Township, Carroll County, Indiana =

Madison Township
- Township
- Location of Madison Township in Carroll County
- Coordinates: 40°30′25″N 86°38′12″W
- Country: United States
- State: Indiana
- County: Carroll

Government
  - Type: Indiana township

Area
  - Total: 20.87 sq mi (54.1 km^{2})
  - Land: 20.87 sq mi (54.1 km^{2})
  - Water: 0 sq mi (0 km^{2})
- Elevation: 692 ft (211 m)

Population (2020)
  - Total: 436
  - Density: 20.9/sq mi (8.07/km^{2})
- FIPS code: 18-45900
- GNIS feature ID: 453588

Madison Township is one of fourteen townships in Carroll County, Indiana. As of the 2020 census, its population was 436 (slightly up from 433 at 2010) and it contained 180 housing units.

== History ==
Madison Township was organized in 1837.

== Geography ==
According to the 2010 census, the township has a total area of 20.87 square miles (54.1 km^{2}), all land.

=== Unincorporated towns ===
- Ockley
- Radnor

=== Adjacent townships ===
- Deer Creek (north)
- Democrat (east)
- Monroe (east)
- Clay (south)
- Washington Township, Tippecanoe County (west)

=== Major highways ===
- U.S. Route 421

=== Cemeteries ===
The township contains one cemetery, Zion.
