= Deer Creek, Carroll County, Indiana =

Deer Creek, Indiana
- Census-designated place
- Interactive map of Deer Creek, Indiana
- Coordinates: 40°36′54″N 86°23′26″W
- Country: United States
- State: Indiana
- County: Carroll
- Township: Washington Township

Area
  - Total: 0.14 sq mi (0.37 km^{2})
  - Land: 0.14 sq mi (0.37 km^{2})
  - Water: 0 sq mi (0.00 km^{2})
- Elevation: 712 ft (217 m)

Population (2020)
  - Total: 115
  - Density: 804.3/sq mi (310.53/km^{2})
- Time zone: UTC-5 (EST)
  - Summer (DST): UTC-4 (EDT)
- FIPS code: 18-17245
- GNIS feature ID: 2806473

Deer Creek is an unincorporated town in Carroll County, Indiana, in the United States. It is tracked by the United States Census as a census-designated place.

== History ==
A post office was established at Deer Creek in 1832, and remained in operation until it was discontinued in 1910. The community was named from the eponymous creek.

== Demographics ==
Historical population
Census	Pop.	Note	%±
2020	115		—
U.S. Decennial Census
