= Sharon, Indiana =

Unincorporated community in Indiana, U.S.

Coordinates: 40°33′13″N 86°23′29″W

Sharon is an unincorporated community in Carroll County, Indiana, in the United States.

== History ==
Sharon was founded in 1868.
