= Tippecanoe Township, Carroll County, Indiana =

Tippecanoe Township
- Township
- Location of Tippecanoe Township in Carroll County
- Coordinates: 40°36′45″N 86°43′36″W
- Country: United States
- State: Indiana
- County: Carroll

Government
  - Type: Indiana township

Area
  - Total: 28.01 sq mi (72.5 km^{2})
  - Land: 27.21 sq mi (70.5 km^{2})
  - Water: 0.8 sq mi (2.1 km^{2})
- Elevation: 650 ft (198 m)

Population (2020)
  - Total: 2,377
  - Density: 87.36/sq mi (33.73/km^{2})
- FIPS code: 18-75824
- GNIS feature ID: 453894

Tippecanoe Township is one of fourteen townships in Carroll County, Indiana. As of the 2020 census, its population was 2,377 (up from 2,341 at 2010) and it contained 1,216 housing units.

== History ==
Tippecanoe Township was organized in 1830.

Carrollton Bridge was listed on the National Register of Historic Places in 2003.

== Geography ==
According to the 2010 census, the township has a total area of 28.01 square miles (72.5 km^{2}), of which 27.21 square miles (70.5 km^{2}) (or 97.14%) is land and 0.8 square miles (2.1 km^{2}) (or 2.86%) is water.

=== Unincorporated towns ===
- Pittsburg

=== Adjacent townships ===
- Jefferson (north)
- Adams (northeast)
- Deer Creek (east)
- Washington Township, Tippecanoe County (south)
- Prairie Township, White County (west)

=== Major highways ===
- U.S. Route 421
- Indiana State Road 18

=== Cemeteries ===
The township contains two cemeteries: Benham and Pleasant Run.
