= Burlington, Indiana =

- Town
- Location of Burlington in Carroll County, Indiana.
- Coordinates: 40°28′55″N 86°23′41″W
- Country: United States
- State: Indiana
- County: Carroll
- Township: Burlington
- Founded: 1828
- Incorporated: 1967

Area
  - Total: 0.61 sq mi (1.58 km^{2})
  - Land: 0.61 sq mi (1.58 km^{2})
  - Water: 0 sq mi (0.00 km^{2})
- Elevation: 778 ft (237 m)

Population (2020)
  - Total: 517
  - Density: 845.0/sq mi (326.26/km^{2})
- Time zone: UTC−5 (EST)
  - Summer (DST): UTC−5 (EST)
- ZIP code: 46915
- Area code: 765
- FIPS code: 18-09244
- GNIS feature ID: 2396619
- Website: www.burlingtonindiana.org

Burlington is a town in Burlington Township, Carroll County, Indiana, United States. As of the 2020 census, Burlington had a population of 517. It is part of the Lafayette, Indiana Metropolitan Statistical Area. State Road 22 connects it to Kokomo.

== History ==
Burlington was laid out in 1832 by David Stipp, an employee of the United States General Land Office in Crawfordsville, Indiana, about a year after settlers first appeared in the area. Stipp donated land for the town's first school house. The town was incorporated in 1967. It is named for Wyandot Chief Burlington. In 1830, work began on the Michigan Road which passed directly through the center of town. The road, which became Indiana's first superhighway, connected Madison, Indiana and Michigan City, Indiana turning the town into a major thoroughfare.

== Geography ==
According to the 2010 census, Burlington has a total area of 0.6 square miles (1.55 km^{2}), all land.

=== Climate ===
July is typically the warmest month in Burlington, when highs average 84 °F (29 °C) and lows average 63 °F (17 °C). January is coldest, when the high temperatures average 33 °F (−1 °C) and the lows average 18 °F (−8 °C). The highest recorded temperature was 105 °F (41 °C) in 1980, and the lowest was −26 °F (−32 °C) in 1983.

== Demographics ==
Historical population
Census	Pop.	Note	%±
1850	164		—
1970	685		—
1980	680		−0.7%
1990	568		−16.5%
2000	444		−21.8%
2010	603		35.8%
2020	517		−14.3%
U.S. Decennial Census

=== 2010 census ===
As of the census of 2010, there were 603 people, 258 households, and 173 families living in the town. The population density was 1,005.0 inhabitants per square mile (388.0/km^{2}). There were 286 housing units at an average density of 476.7 per square mile (184.1/km^{2}). The racial makeup of the town was 98.8% White, 0.5% African American, 0.2% Asian, and 0.5% from two or more races. Hispanic or Latino of any race were 2.0% of the population.

There were 258 households, of which 31.0% had children under the age of 18 living with them, 54.7% were married couples living together, 10.1% had a female householder with no husband present, 2.3% had a male householder with no wife present, and 32.9% were non-families. 28.3% of all households were made up of individuals, and 13.9% had someone living alone who was 65 years of age or older. The average household size was 2.34 and the average family size was 2.81.

The median age in the town was 40.6 years. 23.5% of residents were under the age of 18; 6.5% were between the ages of 18 and 24; 24.9% were from 25 to 44; 23.4% were from 45 to 64; and 21.7% were 65 years of age or older. The gender makeup of the town was 45.8% male and 54.2% female.

=== 2000 census ===
As of the census of 2000, there were 444 people, 207 households, and 127 families living in the town. The population density was 820.0 inhabitants per square mile (316.6/km^{2}). There were 217 housing units at an average density of 400.7 per square mile (154.7/km^{2}). The racial makeup of the town was 99.10% White, 0.23% African American, 0.23% from other races, and 0.45% from two or more races. Hispanic or Latino of any race were 0.68% of the population.

There were 207 households, out of which 22.2% had children under the age of 18 living with them, 48.3% were married couples living together, 9.7% had a female householder with no husband present, and 38.6% were non-families. 34.3% of all households were made up of individuals, and 20.8% had someone living alone who was 65 years of age or older. The average household size was 2.14 and the average family size was 2.71.

In the town, the population was spread out, with 19.6% under the age of 18, 7.2% from 18 to 24, 29.5% from 25 to 44, 21.8% from 45 to 64, and 21.8% who were 65 years of age or older. The median age was 41 years. For every 100 females, there were 92.2 males. For every 100 females age 18 and over, there were 86.9 males.

The median income for a household in the town was $38,472, and the median income for a family was $52,917. Males had a median income of $35,000 versus $17,917 for females. The per capita income for the town was $22,482. About 3.3% of families and 5.5% of the population were below the poverty line, including 2.7% of those under age 18 and 10.0% of those age 65 or over.

== Education ==
The town has a free lending library, the Burlington Community Library.
