= Flora, Indiana =

- Town
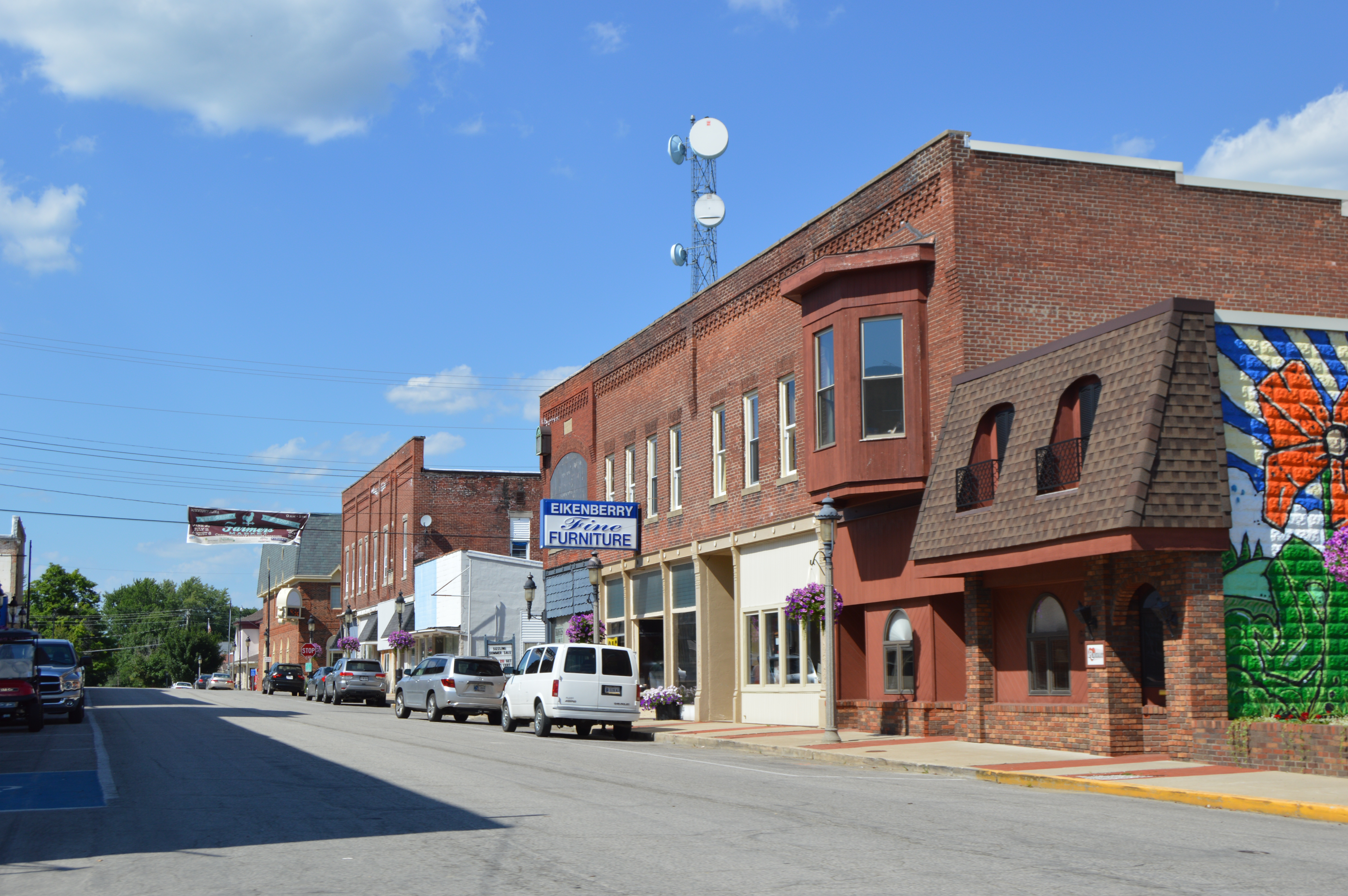
- Center Street downtown
- Nickname: The Garden Spot of Indiana
- Location of Flora in Carroll County, Indiana.
- Coordinates: 40°32′44″N 86°31′21″W
- Country: United States
- State: Indiana
- County: Carroll
- Township: Monroe

Area
  - Total: 1.15 sq mi (2.97 km^{2})
  - Land: 1.15 sq mi (2.97 km^{2})
  - Water: 0 sq mi (0.00 km^{2})
- Elevation: 702 ft (214 m)

Population (2020)
  - Total: 2,094
  - Density: 1,824.1/sq mi (704.27/km^{2})
- Time zone: UTC-5 (EST)
  - Summer (DST): UTC-5 (EST)
- ZIP code: 46929
- Area code: 574
- FIPS code: 18-23692
- GNIS feature ID: 2396940
- Website: www.townofflora.org

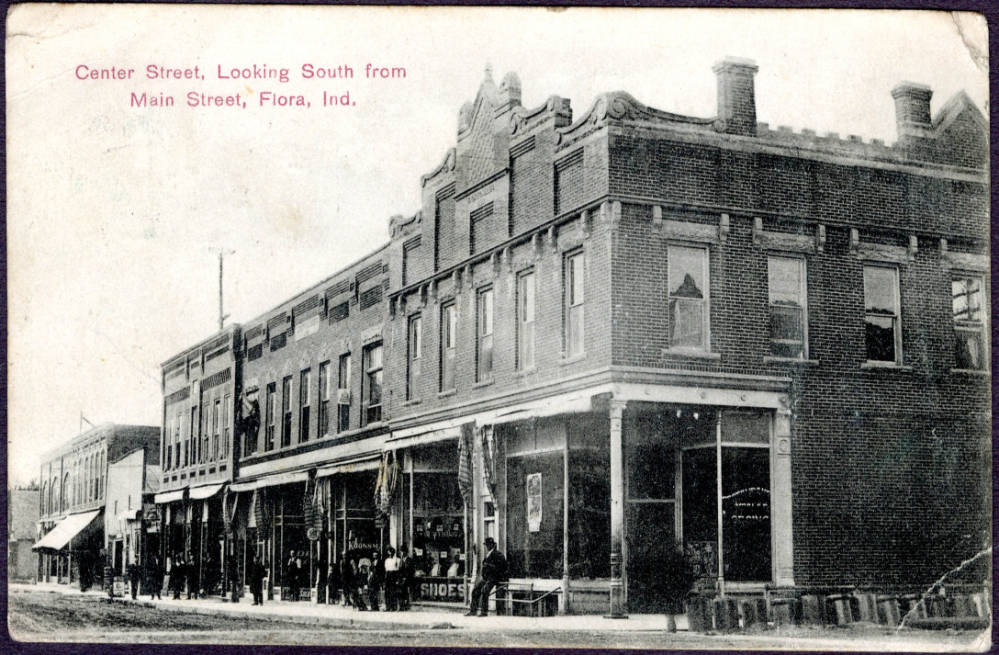
Flora, Indiana from Columbia and Center streets. 1910s

Flora is a town in Monroe Township, Carroll County, Indiana, United States. As of the 2020 census, Flora had a population of 2,094. It is part of the Lafayette metropolitan statistical area.

== History ==
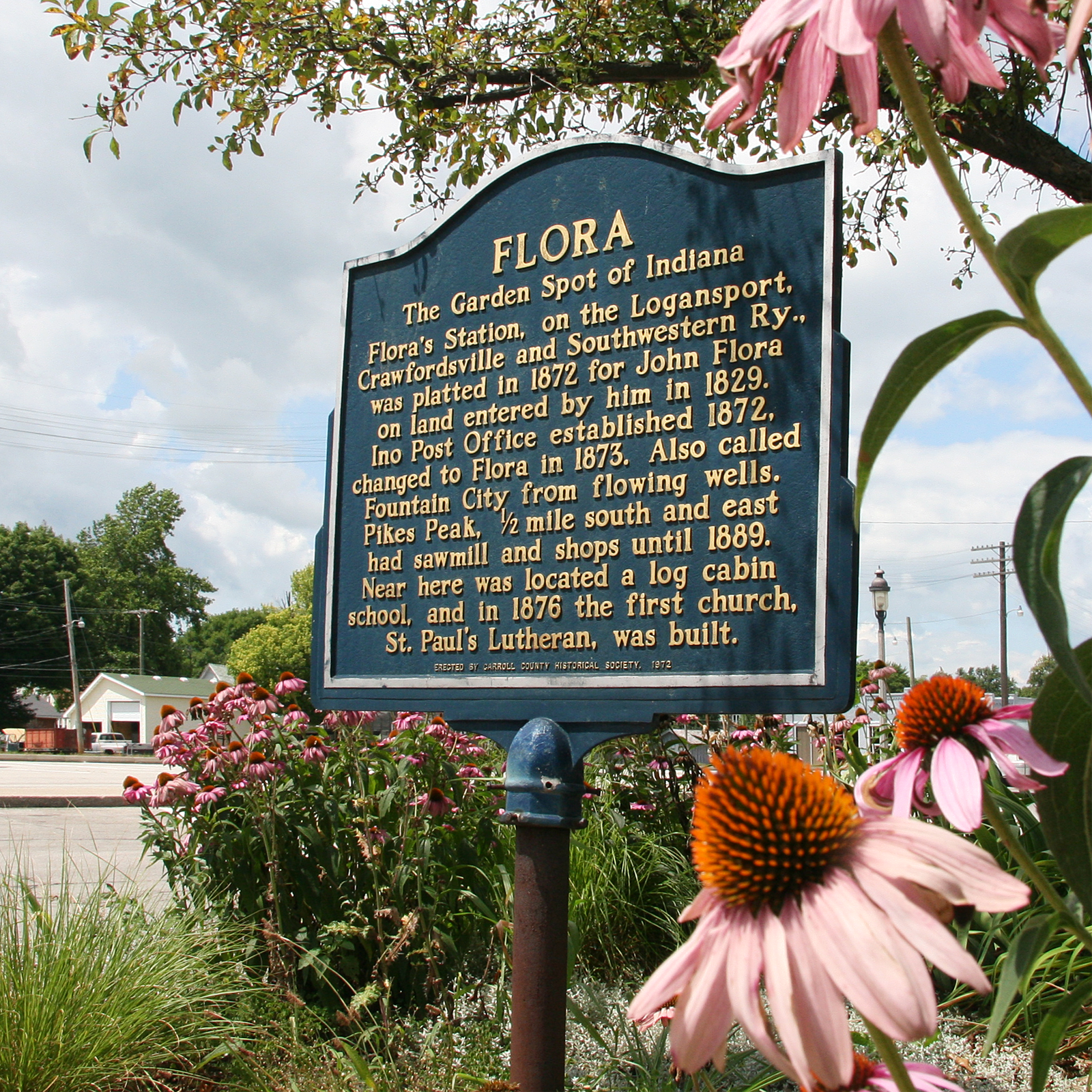
The town's historical marker.

A post office was established at Flora in 1873. Flora was named for its founder, John Flora.

== Geography ==
According to the 2010 census, Flora has a total area of 1.06 square miles (2.75 km^{2}), all land.

== Demographics ==
Historical population
Census	Pop.	Note	%±
1880	224		—
1890	639		185.3%
1900	1,209		89.2%
1910	1,386		14.6%
1920	1,441		4.0%
1930	1,449		0.6%
1940	1,468		1.3%
1950	1,657		12.9%
1960	1,742		5.1%
1970	1,877		7.7%
1980	2,303		22.7%
1990	2,179		−5.4%
2000	2,227		2.2%
2010	2,036		−8.6%
2020	2,094		2.8%
U.S. Decennial Census

=== 2020 census ===
As of the 2020 census, Flora had a population of 2,094. The median age was 39.2 years. 24.2% of residents were under the age of 18 and 19.9% of residents were 65 years of age or older. For every 100 females there were 84.8 males, and for every 100 females age 18 and over there were 83.7 males age 18 and over.

0.0% of residents lived in urban areas, while 100.0% lived in rural areas.

There were 904 households in Flora, of which 29.5% had children under the age of 18 living in them. Of all households, 45.5% were married-couple households, 15.5% were households with a male householder and no spouse or partner present, and 31.7% were households with a female householder and no spouse or partner present. About 32.4% of all households were made up of individuals and 16.3% had someone living alone who was 65 years of age or older.

There were 972 housing units, of which 7.0% were vacant. The homeowner vacancy rate was 2.8% and the rental vacancy rate was 10.2%.

Racial composition as of the 2020 census
Race	Number	Percent
White	1,980	94.6%
Black or African American	36	1.7%
American Indian and Alaska Native	0	0.0%
Asian	2	0.1%
Native Hawaiian and Other Pacific Islander	0	0.0%
Some other race	28	1.3%
Two or more races	48	2.3%
Hispanic or Latino (of any race)	76	3.6%

=== 2010 census ===
As of the census of 2010, there were 2,036 people, 858 households, and 549 families living in the town. The population density was 1,920.8 inhabitants per square mile (741.6/km^{2}). There were 969 housing units at an average density of 914.2 per square mile (353.0/km^{2}). The racial makeup of the town was 97.5% White, 0.3% African American, 1.1% from other races, and 0.9% from two or more races. Hispanic or Latino of any race were 2.6% of the population.

There were 858 households, of which 30.5% had children under the age of 18 living with them, 48.7% were married couples living together, 10.8% had a female householder with no husband present, 4.4% had a male householder with no wife present, and 36.0% were non-families. 31.7% of all households were made up of individuals, and 17.8% had someone living alone who was 65 years of age or older. The average household size was 2.37 and the average family size was 2.96.

The median age in the town was 40.4 years. 25.5% of residents were under the age of 18; 7.3% were between the ages of 18 and 24; 22.2% were from 25 to 44; 25.8% were from 45 to 64; and 19.2% were 65 years of age or older. The gender makeup of the town was 46.8% male and 53.2% female.

=== 2000 census ===
As of the census of 2000, there were 2,227 people, 906 households, and 609 families living in the town. The population density was 2,157.4 inhabitants per square mile (833.0/km^{2}). There were 959 housing units at an average density of 929.0 per square mile (358.7/km^{2}). The racial makeup of the town was 98.16% White, 0.54% African American, 0.04% Native American, 0.04% Pacific Islander, 0.85% from other races, and 0.36% from two or more races. Hispanic or Latino of any race were 2.02% of the population.

There were 906 households, out of which 29.4% had children under the age of 18 living with them, 53.8% were married couples living together, 9.6% had a female householder with no husband present, and 32.7% were non-families. 29.4% of all households were made up of individuals, and 15.6% had someone living alone who was 65 years of age or older. The average household size was 2.36 and the average family size was 2.91.

In the town, the population was spread out, with 23.6% under the age of 18, 8.6% from 18 to 24, 26.4% from 25 to 44, 19.9% from 45 to 64, and 21.5% who were 65 years of age or older. The median age was 39 years. For every 100 females there were 83.9 males. For every 100 females age 18 and over, there were 79.5 males.

The median income for a household in the town was $37,400, and the median income for a family was $43,257. Males had a median income of $35,398 versus $20,281 for females. The per capita income for the town was $18,863. About 4.4% of families and 6.3% of the population were below the poverty line, including 9.9% of those under age 18 and 7.4% of those age 65 or over.

== Education ==
The Carroll Consolidated School Corporation serves the town of Flora. This public school district consists of 2 schools, Carroll Elementary School (K–6), and Carroll Junior/Senior High School (7–12).

The town has a free lending library, the Flora-Monroe Township Public Library.

== Notable people ==
- Paul S. Dunkin, writer, librarian and professor
