= Center Township, Clinton County, Indiana =

Center Township
- Township
- Location of Center Township in Clinton County
- Coordinates: 40°16′45″N 86°29′52″W
- Country: United States
- State: Indiana
- County: Clinton
- Organized: 1872

Government
  - Type: Indiana township

Area
  - Total: 20.62 sq mi (53.4 km^{2})
  - Land: 20.62 sq mi (53.4 km^{2})
  - Water: 0 sq mi (0 km^{2})
- Elevation: 860 ft (262 m)

Population (2020)
  - Total: 17,601
  - Density: 853.6/sq mi (329.6/km^{2})
- FIPS code: 18-11260
- GNIS feature ID: 453174
- Website: www.in.gov/townships/center12/

Center Township is one of fourteen townships in Clinton County, Indiana. As of the 2020 census, its population was 17,601 (up from 17,245 at 2010) and it contained 6,650 housing units. It contains the city of Frankfort, the county seat.

== History ==
Center Township was created in 1872 from the northern part of Jackson Township; the northern part of Center was later split off to create Union Township in 1889. The first white settler in the township was George Michaels in 1827, followed the next year by John Douglass, Matthew Bunnell and Noah Bunnell. More arrived in 1829, including the three Pence brothers who donated the land upon which the city of Frankfort was built.

As the geographic and business center of the county, numerous railroads where laid through the township and included the Monon, the Vandalia, the Toledo, St. Louis and Western, the Terre Haute, Indianapolis and Eastern, and the Kokomo.

== Geography ==
According to the 2010 census, the township has a total area of 20.62 square miles (53.4 km^{2}), all land.

=== Cities and towns ===
- Frankfort

=== Unincorporated towns ===
- East Park
- Kentwood
- Risse
- Wesley Manor
- Wilshire
- Woodside Park

(This list is based on USGS data and may include former settlements.)

=== Adjacent townships ===
- Union Township (north)
- Michigan Township (east)
- Kirklin Township (southeast)
- Jackson Township (south)
- Washington Township (west)

=== Major highways ===
- U.S. Route 421
- Indiana State Road 28
- Indiana State Road 38
- Indiana State Road 75

=== Cemeteries ===
The township contains two cemeteries: Greenlawn Memorial Park and Old South.
