= Forest Township, Clinton County, Indiana =

Forest Township
- Township
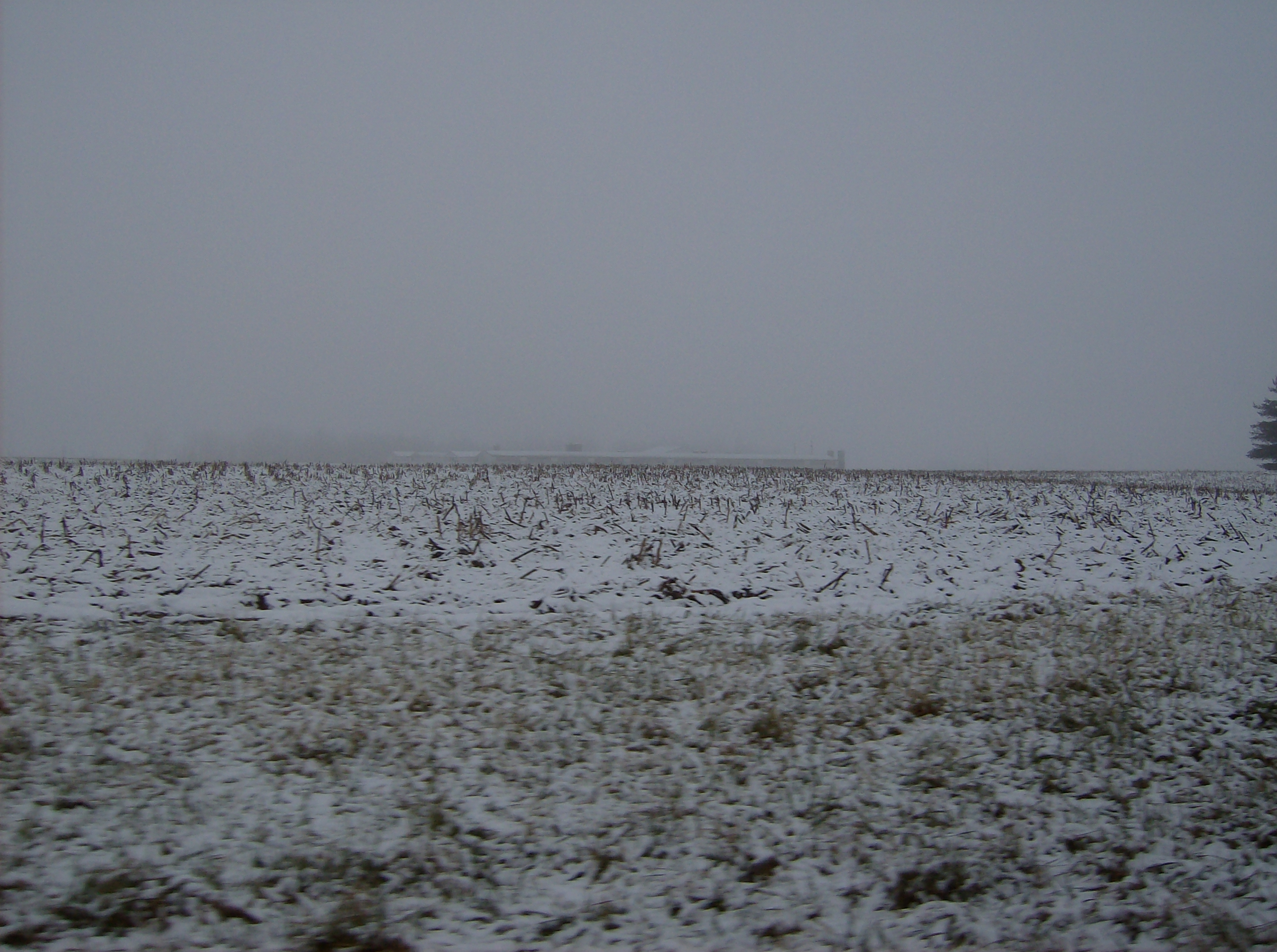
- Snow-covered corn fields in Forest Township

- Location of Forest Township in Clinton County
- Coordinates: 40°22′16″N 86°18′51″W
- Country: United States
- State: Indiana
- County: Clinton
- Organized: 1882

Government
  - Type: Indiana township

Area
  - Total: 26.45 sq mi (68.5 km^{2})
  - Land: 26.43 sq mi (68.5 km^{2})
  - Water: 0.01 sq mi (0.026 km^{2})
- Elevation: 879 ft (268 m)

Population (2020)
  - Total: 759
  - Density: 28.7/sq mi (11.1/km^{2})
- FIPS code: 18-23944
- GNIS feature ID: 453299

Forest Township is one of fourteen townships in Clinton County, Indiana. As of the 2020 census, its population was 759 (a tiny decline of 760 from 2010 The township was named for the large amount of timber it contained at the time it was organized.) and it contained 323 housing units.

== History ==
After the completion of the "Clover Leaf" railroad through the area in 1874 and the establishment of the town of Forest along it, residents petitioned the county commissioners to create a new township for their area out of the existing Johnson and Warren townships. On January 2, 1882, the petition was granted and the township organized with Samuel M. Davis as the first trustee.

The first permanent white settlers in the township were Page and Sarah Sims who arrived in 1839 and resided in the township until their death. The arrival of pioneers here was somewhat later than in other parts of the county since Forest was originally within the Big Miami Reserve and off limits to white settlement until 1838. The population grew slowly and remained sparse and scattered for some years. The first church in the township was the Methodist Swamp Creek chapel built in 1850 near the southern border, and later replaced by St. Paul's church. A post office was established in 1860 in the hamlet of Martinsville, with Martin Davis as the first postmaster.

== Geography ==
According to the 2010 census, the township has a total area of 26.45 square miles (68.5 km^{2}), of which 26.43 square miles (68.5 km^{2}) (or 99.92%) is land and 0.01 square miles (0.026 km^{2}) (or 0.04%) is water.

=== Unincorporated towns ===
- Forest

=== Adjacent townships ===
- Monroe Township, Howard County (north)
- Honey Creek Township, Howard County (northeast)
- Prairie Township, Tipton County (east)
- Johnson Township (south)
- Michigan Township (southwest)
- Warren Township (west)

=== Major highways ===
- Indiana State Road 26

=== Cemeteries ===
The township contains three cemeteries: St. Paul Cemetery which was originally known as Swamp Creek Cemetery. The first recorded burial was in 1852 and today has 1,367 graves. Smith Cemetery was used from 1851 to 1880 and has 23 graves. Union Cemetery which was originally known as Stringer Cemetery. The first recorded burials were in 1849 and it currently has 438 graves
