= Moran, Indiana =

Moran
- Unincorporated community
- Location within Clinton County, Indiana
- Coordinates: 40°23′15″N 86°30′55″W
- Country: United States
- State: Indiana
- County: Clinton
- Township: Owen
- Founded: 1873
- Elevation: 807 ft (246 m)
- ZIP code: 46041
- FIPS code: 18-51012
- GNIS feature ID: 439418

Moran is an unincorporated community in Owen Township, Clinton County, Indiana. Originally a station on the Vandalia Railroad, Moran was laid out by Noah L. Bunnell in October, 1873, and named for an official of the railroad. The official, who was from Sedalia, Illinois, also suggested the name of the nearby town of Sedalia, Indiana.

A post office was established at Moran in 1872, and remained in operation until it was discontinued in 1955.
