= John Young House (Geetingsville, Indiana) =

Historic house in Indiana, United States

- U.S. National Register of Historic Places
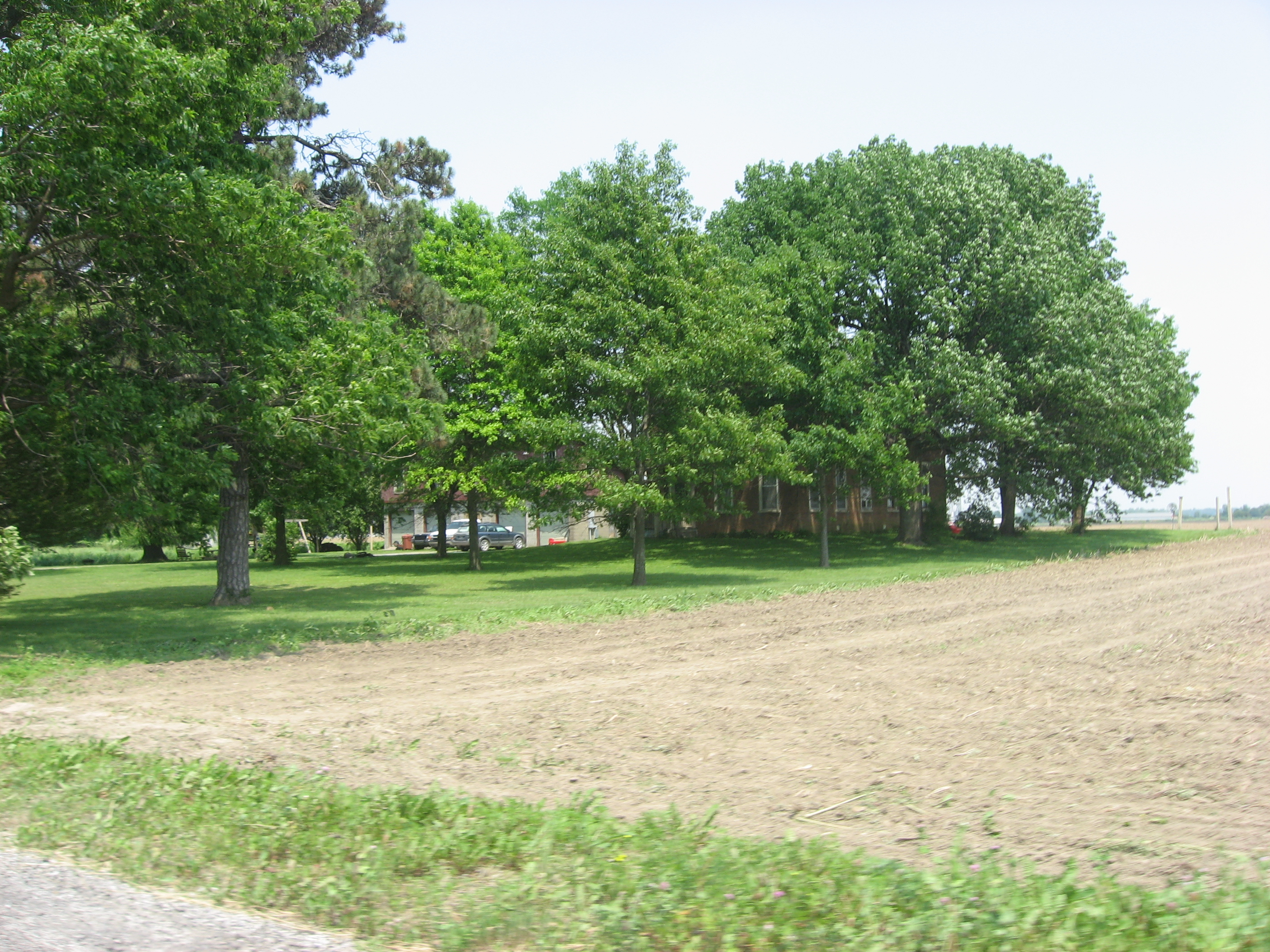

- Location within Indiana Location within the United States
- Location: 9665 N Co. Rd. 250 E, northeast of Geetingsville, Warren Township, Clinton County, Indiana
- Coordinates: 40°25′36″N 86°27′31″W
- Area: 1 acre (0.40 ha)
- Built: c. 1860
- Architectural style: Greek Revival, Italianate
- NRHP reference No.: 94001348
- Added to NRHP: November 25, 1994

John Young House, also known as the Young-Carter House, is a historic home located in Warren Township, Clinton County, Indiana. It was built about 1860, and is a two-story, Greek Revival style brick dwelling with Italianate style detailing. It has a gabled temple form front facade and an attached kitchen wing. The front portico was reconstructed in 1992–1993.

It was listed on the National Register of Historic Places in 1994.
