= Union Township, Clinton County, Indiana =

Union Township
- Township
- Location of Union Township in Clinton County
- Coordinates: 40°19′29″N 86°30′48″W
- Country: United States
- State: Indiana
- County: Clinton
- Organized: 1889

Government
  - Type: Indiana township

Area
  - Total: 19.91 sq mi (51.6 km^{2})
  - Land: 19.8 sq mi (51 km^{2})
  - Water: 0.11 sq mi (0.28 km^{2})
- Elevation: 837 ft (255 m)

Population (2020)
  - Total: 940
  - Density: 47/sq mi (18/km^{2})
- FIPS code: 18-77192
- GNIS feature ID: 453910

Union Township is one of fourteen townships in Clinton County, Indiana, United States. As of the 2020 census, its population was 940 (down from 973 at 2010) and it contained 405 housing units. The township's name refers to its creation from the northern part of Center Township and the southern part of Owen.

== Elected Officials ==
- Trustee Kevin Evans, Elected January 1, 2023

Current Address of Union Township: 1750 E Garnett Dr. Frankfort, IN 46041

Current Phone Number of Union Township: 765-357-0390

- Board Chairman: Paul Dorsey
- Board Member: David Little
- Board Member: Joe Carter

== History ==
Organized in 1889, Union was the last of Clinton County's townships to be created. It was formed as the result of dissatisfaction among the residents of northern Center Township with "a tax donation made to secure the Clover Leaf shops at Frankfort."

== Geography ==
According to the 2010 census, the township has a total area of 19.91 square miles (51.6 km^{2}), of which 19.8 square miles (51 km^{2}) (or 99.45%) is land and 0.11 square miles (0.28 km^{2}) (or 0.55%) is water.

=== Unincorporated towns ===
- Kilmore

=== Adjacent townships ===
- Owen Township (north)
- Michigan Township (east)
- Center Township (south)
- Washington Township (west)
- Ross Township (northwest)

=== Major highways ===
- U.S. Route 421
- Indiana State Road 75

=== Cemeteries ===
Cemeteries:

- City Dump
- Kilmore
- St. Luke's
- ...and more
