= Owen Township, Clinton County, Indiana =

Owen Township
- Township
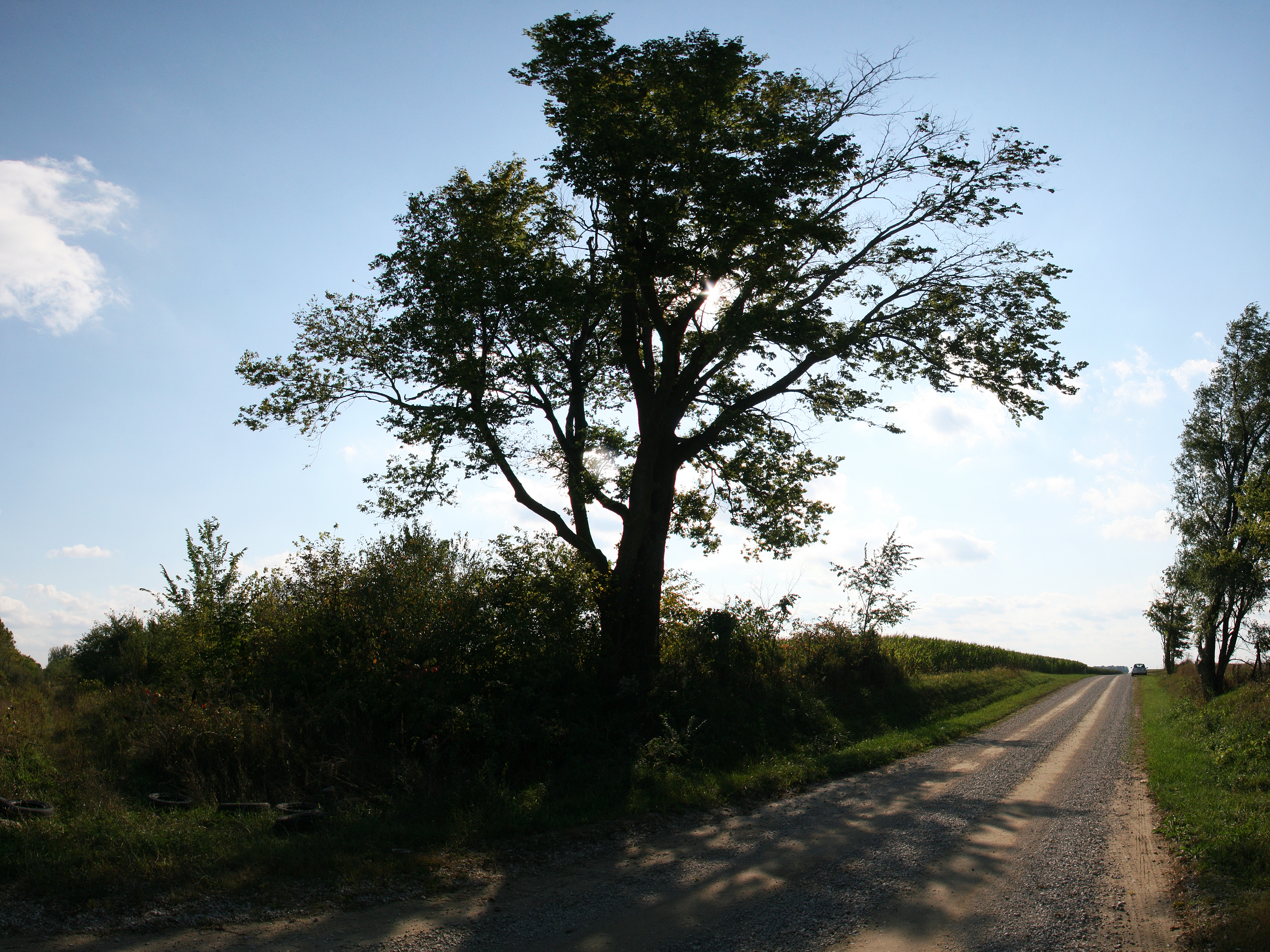
- County Road 600 North at Ellis, once a stop along the now-defunct railroad.

- Location of Owen Township in Clinton County
- Coordinates: 40°23′25″N 86°30′56″W
- Country: United States
- State: Indiana
- County: Clinton
- Organized: 1843
- Named for: Robert Dale Owen

Government
  - Type: Indiana township

Area
  - Total: 24.98 sq mi (64.7 km^{2})
  - Land: 24.98 sq mi (64.7 km^{2})
  - Water: 0 sq mi (0 km^{2})
- Elevation: 784 ft (239 m)

Population (2020)
  - Total: 879
  - Density: 35.2/sq mi (13.6/km^{2})
- FIPS code: 18-57456
- GNIS feature ID: 453701

Owen Township is one of the fourteen townships in Clinton County, Indiana. As of the 2020 census, its population was 879 (down from 930 at 2010) and it contained 346 housing units. The township was named after Robert Dale Owen of New Harmony.

== History ==
Originally included in Jackson Township, Owen was organized as a separate township in March, 1843. It lost a one-mile (1.6 km) strip along its southern border to Union Township which was created in 1889, leaving Owen a five-mile (8 km) by five-mile square. The first settlers in the area were Elihu Short, Samuel Gray, John Temple, and John Miller in 1828.

== Geography ==
According to the 2010 census, the township has a total area of 24.98 square miles (64.7 km^{2}), all land.

=== Unincorporated towns ===
- Cambria
- Ellis
- Geetingsville
- Moran
- Sedalia

(This list is based on USGS data and may include former settlements.)

=== Adjacent townships ===
- Democrat Township, Carroll County (north)
- Burlington Township, Carroll County (northeast)
- Warren Township (east)
- Michigan Township (southeast)
- Union Township (south)
- Ross Township (west)

=== Major highways ===
- Indiana State Road 26
- Indiana State Road 75
- Indiana State Road 38

=== Cemeteries ===
Cemeteries:

- Mount Hope
- Old Chaney
