= Warren Township, Clinton County, Indiana =

Warren Township
- Township
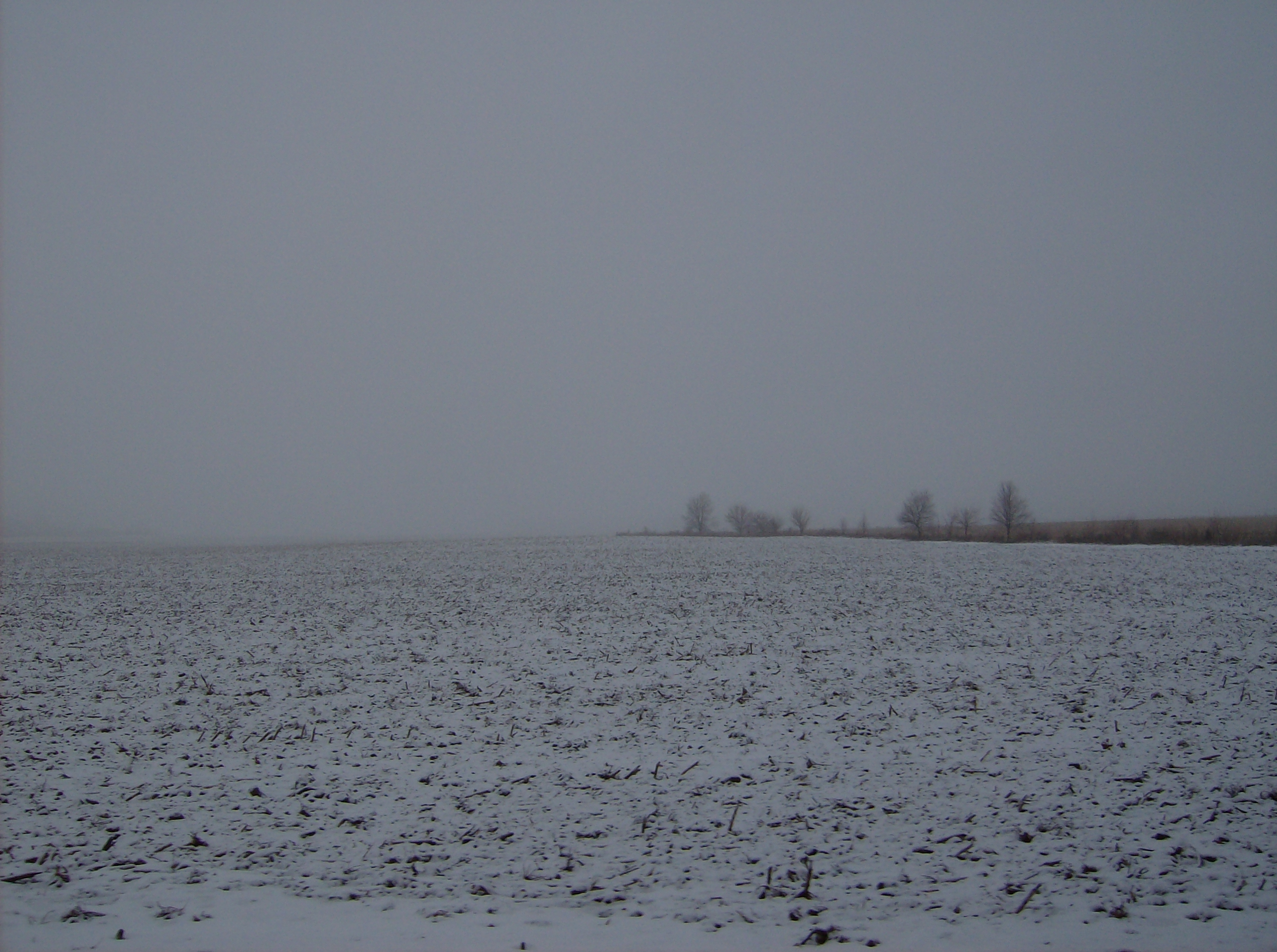
- Snowy countryside in Warren Township

- Location of Warren Township in Clinton County
- Coordinates: 40°23′42″N 86°25′08″W
- Country: United States
- State: Indiana
- County: Clinton
- Organized: 1834

Government
  - Type: Indiana township

Area
  - Total: 29.44 sq mi (76.2 km^{2})
  - Land: 29.44 sq mi (76.2 km^{2})
  - Water: 0 sq mi (0 km^{2})
- Elevation: 860 ft (262 m)

Population (2020)
  - Total: 596
  - Density: 20.2/sq mi (7.82/km^{2})
- FIPS code: 18-80090
- GNIS feature ID: 453974

Warren Township is one of fourteen townships in Clinton County, Indiana, United States. As of the 2020 census, its population was 596 (down from 619 at 2010) and it contained 255 housing units.

== History ==
Originally part of Jackson Township, Warren was made a separate township in 1834. The first settler in the area was A. F. Whiteman who located on Section 23 in 1830.

The John Young House was listed on the National Register of Historic Places in 1994.

== Geography ==
According to the 2010 census, the township has a total area of 29.44 square miles (76.2 km^{2}), all land.

=== Unincorporated towns ===
- Beard
- Middlefork

=== Adjacent townships ===
- Burlington Township, Carroll County (north)
- Monroe Township, Howard County (northeast)
- Forest Township (east)
- Michigan Township (south)
- Owen Township (west)
- Democrat Township, Carroll County (northwest)

=== Major highways ===
- Indiana State Road 26
- Indiana State Road 29

=== Cemeteries ===
The township contains six cemeteries: Campbell, Grays, Old Liberty, Old Prophet, Sims and Veneman.
