= Mortonsville, Indiana =

Coordinates: 40°21′33.7″N 86°19′6.8″W

Mortonsville, also known as Martinsville, is an extinct small town in Forest Township, Clinton County, Indiana in the United States. In 1860 it gained a post office with Martin Davis as the first postmaster and, though on a contract route and not appearing in the official list of U.S. post offices, served the community for a number of years.

When the Clover Leaf railroad was built through the township it bypassed Martinsville and established instead a station at Forest about two miles away, leading to the town's demise.

== Geography ==
A 1913 history of Clinton County gives Martinsville's position as "at the northeast corner of section seventeen" in Forest Township.
