= Ross Township, Clinton County, Indiana =

Ross Township
- Township
- Location of Ross Township in Clinton County
- Coordinates: 40°23′45″N 86°36′47″W
- Country: United States
- State: Indiana
- County: Clinton
- Organized: 1830
- Named for: John Ross, settler

Government
  - Type: Indiana township

Area
  - Total: 29.58 sq mi (76.6 km^{2})
  - Land: 29.58 sq mi (76.6 km^{2})
  - Water: 0 sq mi (0 km^{2})
- Elevation: 738 ft (225 m)

Population (2020)
  - Total: 2,823
  - Density: 95.44/sq mi (36.85/km^{2})
- FIPS code: 18-66078
- GNIS feature ID: 453813

Ross Township is one of 14 townships in Clinton County, Indiana. As of the 2020 census, its population was 2,823 (down from 2,898 at 2010) and it contained 1,146 housing units. The township was named for John Ross, a pioneer settler and associate county judge.

== History ==
Ross was one of Clinton County's original townships created on May 15, 1830. Solomon Miller—who arrived in March 1828—was its first settler. According to a 1913 county history, a considerable number of the township's early settlers were Pennsylvania Germans and Dunkards.

== Geography ==
According to the 2010 census, the township has a total area of 29.58 square miles (76.6 km^{2}), all land.

=== Cities and towns ===
- Rossville

=== Unincorporated towns ===
- Edna Mills

(This list is based on USGS data and may include former settlements.)

=== Adjacent townships ===
- Clay Township, Carroll County (north)
- Democrat Township, Carroll County (northeast)
- Owen Township (east)
- Union Township (southeast)
- Washington Township (south)
- Madison Township (southwest)
- Perry Township, Tippecanoe County (west)
- Sheffield Township, Tippecanoe County (west)

=== Major highways ===
- U.S. Route 421
- Indiana State Road 26
- Indiana State Road 38

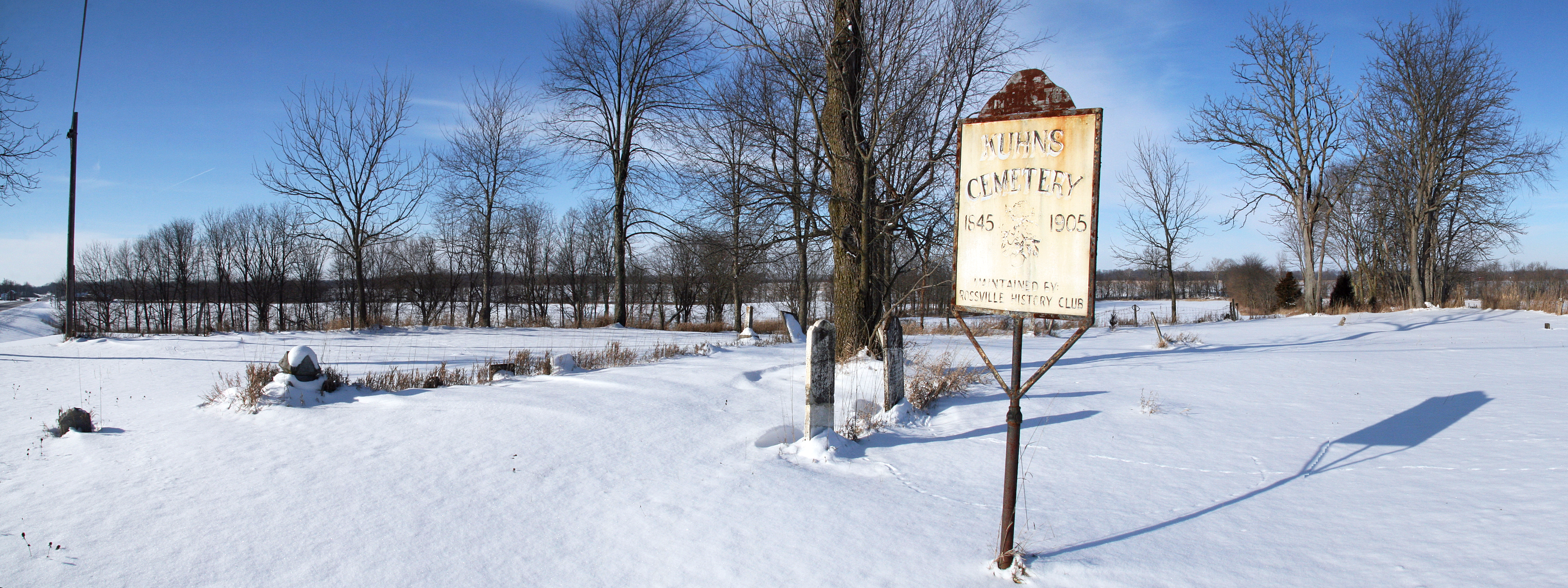
Historic Kuhns Cemetery west of Rossville.

=== Cemeteries ===
The township contains four cemeteries: Hiner, Kuhns, Latshaw and Pleasant View.
