= Clay Township, Carroll County, Indiana =

Clay Township
- Township
- Location of Clay Township in Carroll County
- Coordinates: 40°27′27″N 86°37′58″W
- Country: United States
- State: Indiana
- County: Carroll

Government
  - Type: Indiana township

Area
  - Total: 20.77 sq mi (53.8 km^{2})
  - Land: 20.76 sq mi (53.8 km^{2})
  - Water: 0.01 sq mi (0.026 km^{2})
- Elevation: 692 ft (211 m)

Population (2020)
  - Total: 1,218
  - Density: 58.67/sq mi (22.65/km^{2})
- FIPS code: 18-12988
- GNIS feature ID: 453205

Clay Township is one of fourteen townships in Carroll County, Indiana. As of the 2020 census, its population was 1,218 (down from 1,255 at 2010) and it contained 475 housing units. Clay Township is part of the Rossville, Indiana school district.

== History ==
Clay Township was organized in 1831.

== Geography ==
According to the 2010 census, the township has a total area of 20.77 square miles (53.8 km^{2}), of which 20.76 square miles (53.8 km^{2}) (or 99.95%) is land and 0.01 square miles (0.026 km^{2}) (or 0.05%) is water. The North Fork and Middle Fork of the Wildcat Creek both pass through Clay Township. The Lancaster Bridge, an historic covered bridge erected in 1872, spans the North Fork of the Wildcat Creek east of Owasco. The North Fork is an official Indiana State Scenic River.

=== Unincorporated towns ===
- Owasco
- Pyrmont

=== Adjacent townships ===
- Madison Township (north)
- Democrat Township (east)
- Ross Township, Clinton County (south)
- Perry Township, Tippecanoe County (west)
- Washington Township, Tippecanoe County (northwest)

=== Major highways ===
- U.S. Route 421

=== Cemeteries ===
The township contains four cemeteries: Beard, Hufford, Hufford, Hughes and St. John's.
