= Johnson Township, Clinton County, Indiana =

Johnson Township
- Township
- Location of Johnson Township in Clinton County
- Coordinates: 40°18′18″N 86°18′32″W
- Country: United States
- State: Indiana
- County: Clinton
- Organized: 1843
- Named after: Richard Johnson

Government
  - Type: Indiana township

Area
  - Total: 26.67 sq mi (69.1 km^{2})
  - Land: 26.67 sq mi (69.1 km^{2})
  - Water: 0 sq mi (0 km^{2})
- Elevation: 912 ft (278 m)

Population (2020)
  - Total: 450
  - Density: 19.2/sq mi (7.4/km^{2})
- FIPS code: 18-38628
- GNIS feature ID: 453510

Johnson Township is one of fourteen townships in Clinton County, Indiana. As of the 2020 census, its population was 450 (down from 511 in 2010) and it contained 213 housing units.

The township was named for Richard M. Johnson, a military officer and later vice president of the United States. and it contained 213 housing units.

== History ==
Johnson Township, established in March 1843 by the county commissioners, was one of the later areas of the county to be settled, it being originally included in the Big Miami Reserve and not open to white settlement until after the cession of 1838. The township's first white settlers were brothers George, William and Charles Thomas who arrived in 1839 and for two years were the only residents.

The township's early social and business center was Burget's Corner two and a half miles north of Scircleville which had a general store and a post office that remained in operation for over 30 years. The building housing the store and post office was later moved to Scircleville and used as a saloon. Berlin, another early settlement platted in 1847 in the southeastern part of the township, also faded into extinction during the 19th century.

== Geography ==
According to the 2010 census, the township has a total area of 26.67 square miles (69.1 km^{2}), all land. A Norfolk Southern rail line runs east and west through the southern part of the township, connecting Frankfort and Tipton. The line previously operated as the Lake Erie and Western Railroad and the Nickel Plate.

=== Unincorporated towns ===
- Hillisburg
- Scircleville

=== Adjacent townships ===
- Forest Township (north)
- Prairie Township, Tipton County (northeast)
- Jefferson Township, Tipton County (east)
- Sugar Creek Township (south)
- Kirklin Township (southwest)
- Michigan Township (west)

=== Cemeteries ===
The township contains seven cemeteries: Bacon, Baker, Merrit, Plummer, Prairie Chapel, Scott and Stroup.
