= Heath, Indiana =

- Ghost town
- Tippecanoe County's location in Indiana

- Location in Tippecanoe County
- Coordinates: 40°27′41″N 86°44′00″W
- Country: United States
- State: Indiana
- County: Tippecanoe
- Township: Perry
- Elevation: 669 ft (204 m)
- Time zone: UTC-5 (Eastern (EST))
  - Summer (DST): UTC-4 (EDT)
- ZIP code: 47905
- Area code: 765
- GNIS feature ID: 435952

Heath was a small town, now extinct, in Perry Township, Tippecanoe County, in the U.S. state of Indiana.

== Geography ==
Heath is located at 40°27'41" North, 86°44'00" West (40.461389, -86.733333), on a bluff overlooking Wildcat Creek to the southeast. It is in Perry Township and has an elevation of approximately 669 feet. The post office at Heath was established in 1888 and discontinued in 1902.

A few buildings in the community still exist, and it is still cited by the USGS.
