= Hershey House =

Historic house in Indiana, United States

- U.S. National Register of Historic Places
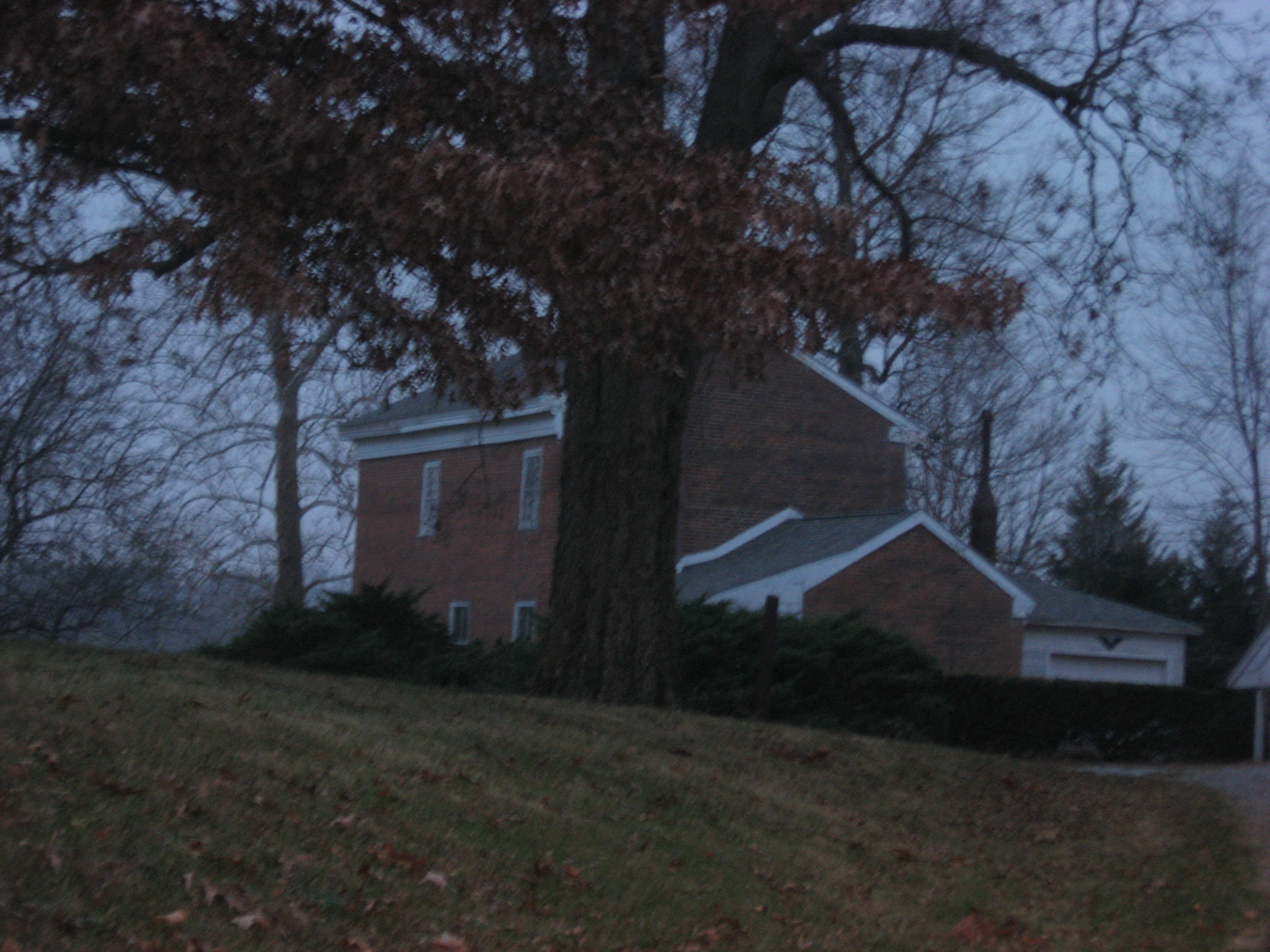
- Hershey House, November 2010

- Location within Tippecanoe County, Indiana Location within Indiana Location within the United States
- Location: East of Lafayette on East Rd., Perry Township, Tippecanoe County, Indiana
- Coordinates: 40°26′42″N 86°45′59″W
- Area: 1 acre (0.40 ha)
- Built: 1856
- Architectural style: Greek Revival
- NRHP reference No.: 78000054
- Added to NRHP: November 28, 1978

Hershey House, also known as the Patrick Home, is a historic home located in Perry Township, Tippecanoe County, Indiana. It was built in 1856, and is a two-story, Greek Revival style brick dwelling, with a 1 1/2-story rear wing. It is three bays wide and has a gable front roof. Also on the property is a contributing fieldstone milk house. It was the home of William Hershey, son of the builder Joseph M. Hershey, who served with the 16th Independent Battery Indiana Light Artillery in the American Civil War and witnessed the assassination of Abraham Lincoln.

It was listed on the National Register of Historic Places in 1978.
