= Monitor, Indiana =

- Unincorporated community
- Tippecanoe County's location in Indiana

- Location in Tippecanoe County
- Coordinates: 40°25′11″N 86°45′23″W
- Country: United States
- State: Indiana
- County: Tippecanoe
- Township: Perry
- Elevation: 591 ft (180 m)
- Time zone: UTC-5 (Eastern (EST))
  - Summer (DST): UTC-4 (EDT)
- ZIP code: 47905
- Area code: 765
- GNIS feature ID: 439326

Monitor is a small unincorporated community in Perry Township, Tippecanoe County, in the U.S. state of Indiana.

== History ==
The town's original name was Cynthyana.

A post office was established at Monitor in 1864, and remained in operation until it was discontinued in 1902.

The former Monitor High School, since closed to school consolidation, fielded a basketball team which won a sectional championship in 1943 despite the community's small size. They defeated Lafayette Jefferson, who would go on to set a state record by winning the next 29 consecutive sectional championships between 1944 and 1972.

The former Monitor schoolhouse was used as a drug addiction treatment facility until 2007. In 2010 it was set on fire in an arson incident.

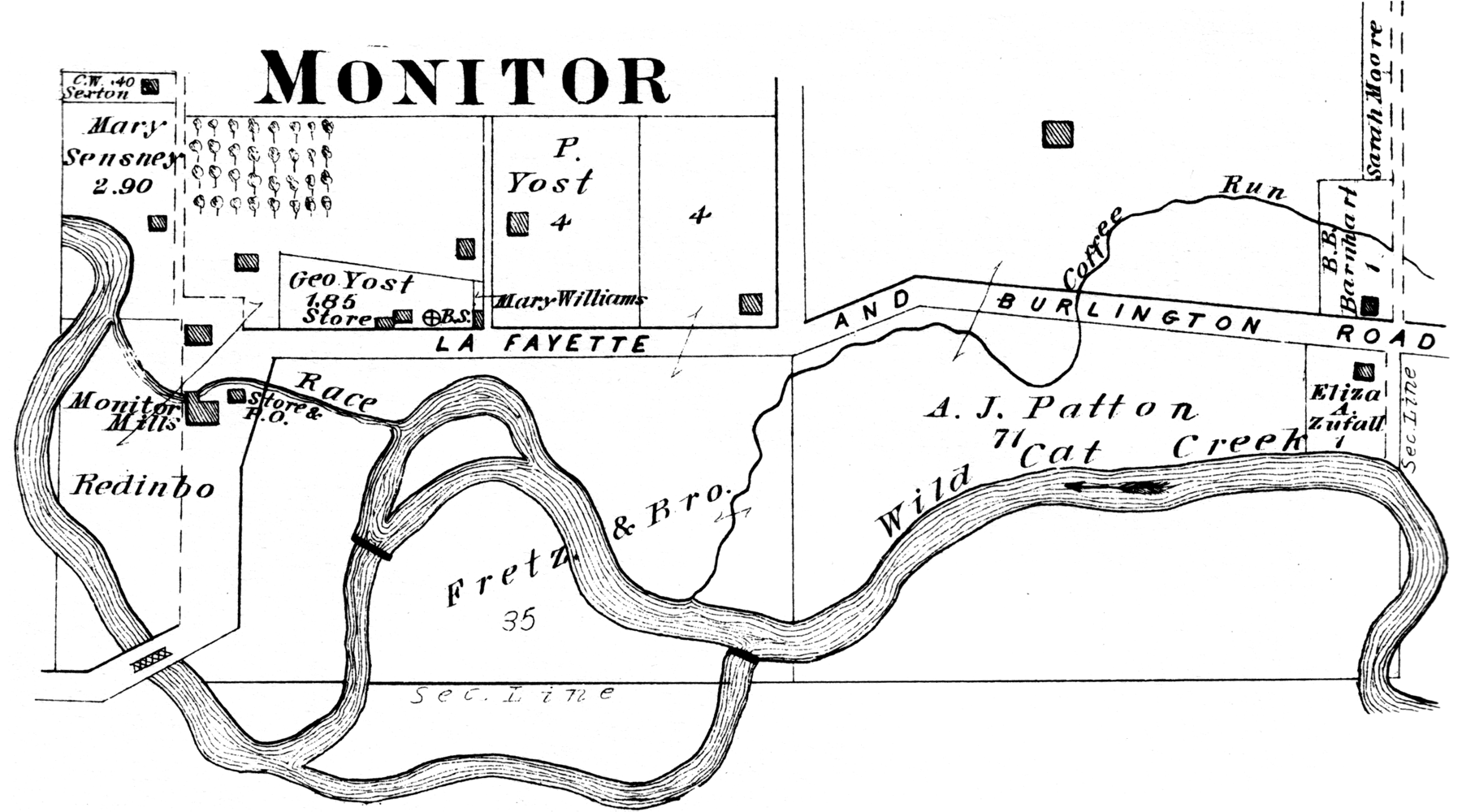
Monitor in 1878
