= Scircleville, Indiana =

Scircleville
- Unincorporated community and Census-designated place
- Location within Clinton County, Indiana Location within Indiana Location within the United States
- Coordinates: 40°17′17″N 86°18′06″W
- Country: United States
- State: Indiana
- County: Clinton
- Township: Johnson Township
- Named for: George Adam Scircle
- Elevation: 929 ft (283 m)
- FIPS code: 18-68364
- GNIS feature ID: 2830345

Scircleville is an unincorporated community in Johnson Township, Clinton County, Indiana. Scircleville was named in honor of George Scircle.

== History ==
Scircleville was platted in 1873 by George Adam Scircle and became a small local trade center. Josiah Drake opened its first general store and John Scircle opened the first drug store. In the late 19th and early 20th centuries Scircleville was home to a number of lodges and fraternal organizations including the GAR, Odd Fellows, Red Men and Masons.

The Scircleville post office was established in 1875.

== Demographics ==
Historical population
Census	Pop.	Note	%±
2023 (est.)	83

The United States Census Bureau defined Scircleville as a census designated place in the 2022 American Community Survey.
