= Berlin, Indiana =

Berlin
- Ghost town
- Former location in Indiana
- Coordinates: 40.273338°N 86.247335°W
- Country: United States
- State: Indiana
- County: Clinton
- Township: Johnson

Berlin is an extinct town in Johnson Township, Clinton County, Indiana in the United States.

== History ==
Platted in 1847 on Indian Prairie near the southeast corner of the township, the town faded during the 19th century and by the early 1900s was "off the map".
