= Kilmore, Indiana =

Kilmore
- Unincorporated community
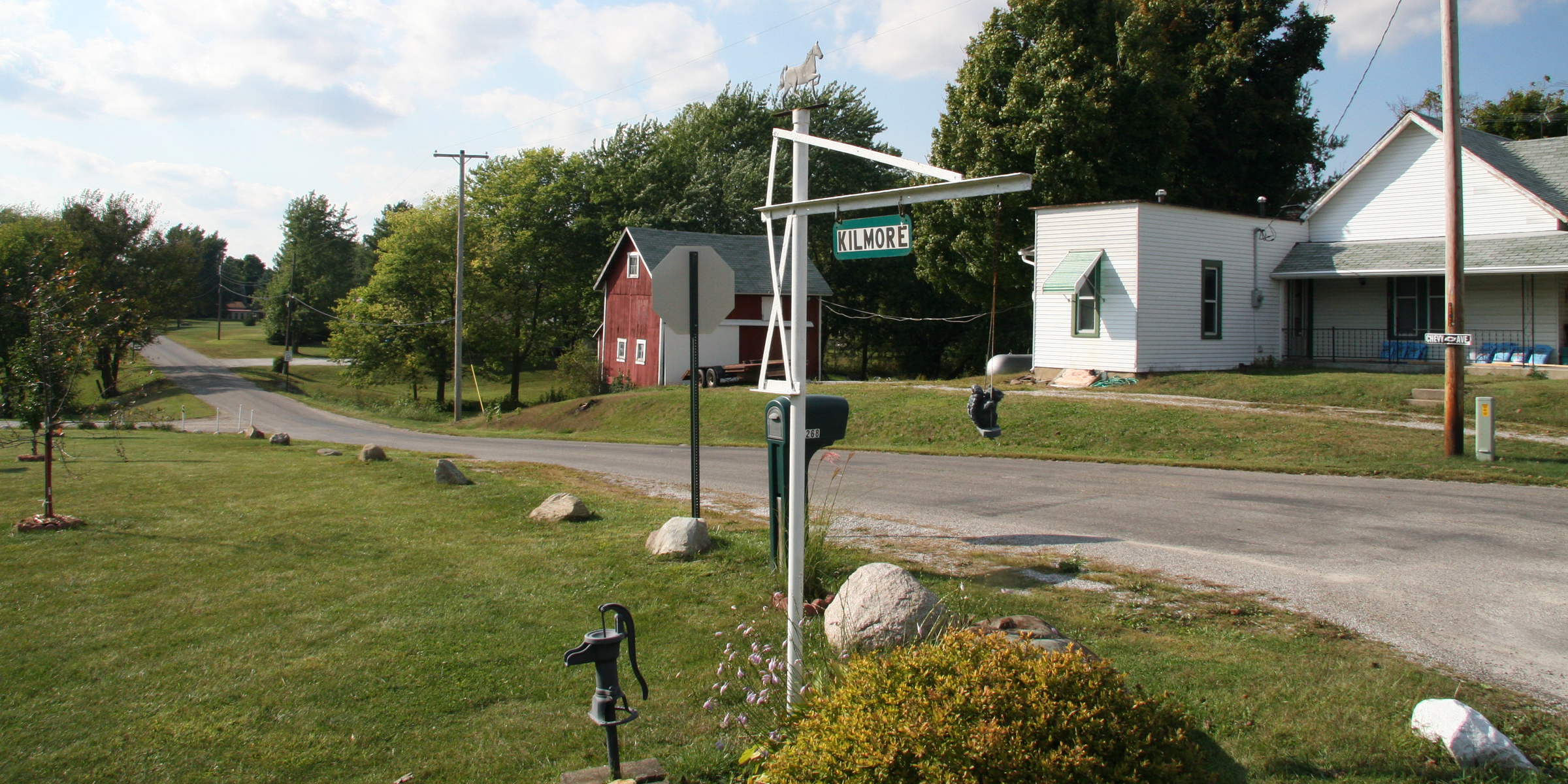

- Location within Clinton County, Indiana
- Coordinates: 40°20′55″N 86°30′20″W
- Country: United States
- State: Indiana
- County: Clinton
- Township: Union
- Founded: 1854
- Elevation: 833 ft (254 m)
- ZIP code: 46041
- FIPS code: 18-39726
- GNIS feature ID: 437301

Kilmore is an unincorporated community in Union Township, Clinton County, Indiana. The town was laid out in 1854 by Abner C. Pence and for twenty years was known as Penceville, but after it became a station on the Vandalia Railroad in 1870 the company changed its name to Kilmore after the nearby creek (which was named for settler John Killmore).

A post office was established at Kilmore in 1872, and remained in operation until it was discontinued in 1903.
