= Beard, Indiana =

Beard
- Unincorporated community
- Location within Clinton County, Indiana
- Coordinates: 40°22′25″N 86°27′02″W
- Country: United States
- State: Indiana
- County: Clinton
- Township: Warren
- Elevation: 850 ft (260 m)
- ZIP code: 46041
- FIPS code: 18-03862
- GNIS feature ID: 430647

Beard is an unincorporated community in Warren Township, Clinton County, Indiana.

== History ==
Beard was founded around 1839.

== Geography ==
Beard is located approximately 10 mi (16 km) northeast of Frankfort.

== Notable person ==
- Elmer Johnson, baseball player
