= Edna Mills, Indiana =

Edna Mills
- Unincorporated community
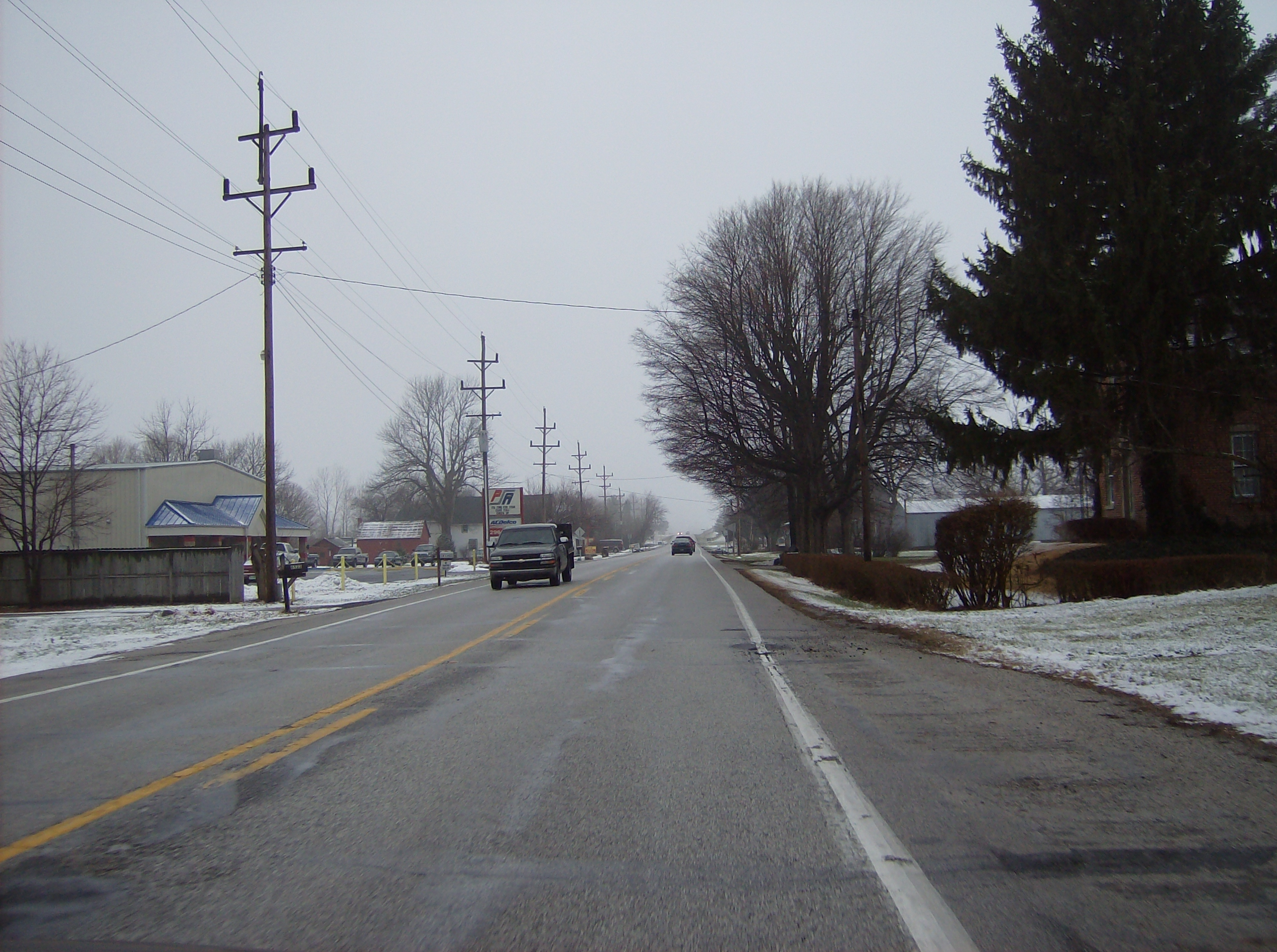
- Along State Road 26 in Edna Mills

- Location within Clinton County, Indiana
- Coordinates: 40°25′03″N 86°40′04″W
- Country: United States
- State: Indiana
- County: Clinton
- Township: Ross
- Named for: Edna Kellenbarger
- Elevation: 653 ft (199 m)
- ZIP code: 46065
- FIPS code: 18-20440
- GNIS feature ID: 434027

Edna Mills is an unincorporated community in Ross Township, Clinton County, Indiana.

== History ==
A 1913 history of Clinton County describes Edna Mills as "a pleasant village" and offers the following origin of the town's name:

The name has been in use for over half a century, and the oldest inhabitants of the vicinity say that when it was first made a postoffice, a Mr. Kellenbarger, who owned a mill at that point, gave it the name of Edna in honor of his wife. The location also used to be called facetiously "Blackberry". The occasion for this was that a blacksmith named Michaels had a shop there and his favorite tipple was blackberry brandy, making "Blackberry" the notable feature of the locality.

A post office was established at Edna Mills in 1861, and remained in operation until it was discontinued in 1905.
