= Elmer Johnson =

American baseball player (1884–1966)

- Catcher
- Born: June 12, 1884; Beard, Indiana, U.S.
- Died: October 31, 1966 (aged 82); Hollywood, Florida, U.S.
- Batted: Right Threw: Right

MLB debut
- April 24, 1914, for the New York Giants

Last MLB appearance
- October 6, 1914, for the New York Giants

MLB statistics
- Games played: 11
- At bats: 12
- Hits: 2
- Stats at Baseball Reference

Teams
- New York Giants (1914)

Elmer Ellsworth Johnson (June 12, 1884 – October 31, 1966) was an American catcher in Major League Baseball. Nicknamed "Hickory", he played for the New York Giants in 1914.
