= Indiana State Road 26 =

Highway in Indiana

State Road 26
- SR 26 highlighted in red

Route information
- Maintained by INDOT
- Length: 150.100 mi (241.563 km)
- Existed: October 1, 1926–present

Western segment
- Length: 29.857 mi (48.050 km)
- West end: SR 352 / IL 9 near Ambia
- Major intersections: US 41 west of Pine Village
- East end: US 52 / US 231 near West Lafayette

Eastern segment
- Length: 120.243 mi (193.512 km)
- West end: I-65 at Lafayette
- Major intersections: US 421 near Rossville; US 31 near Kokomo; I-69 at Fowlerton; US 27 near Portland
- East end: SR 119 east of Portland

Location
- Country: United States
- State: Indiana

Highway system
- Indiana State Highway System; Interstate; US; State; Scenic
← SR 25	→ US 27

State Road 26 (IN 26 or SR 26) is an east–west discontinuous state road in the central part of the US state of Indiana. The western end of the western segment is at the Illinois border, where it continues as Illinois Route 9. The highway passes through rural areas of Warren and Tippecanoe counties, before ending near West Lafayette. The eastern segment begins at an interchange with Interstate 65 (I-65) and heads east passing through the cities of Kokomo, Hartford City, and Portland, before ending at the Ohio border, where it continues east as Ohio State Route 119. The road covers a distance of about 150.1 miles (241.6 km), passing through mostly rural areas.

The originally designated road along modern SR 26 was SR 29, running between Lafayette and US 31, with SR 26 being routed between Bloomington and Madison. In the mid-1920s the state of Indiana renumbered its state road system and the SR 26 designated was moved to its contemporary alignment. During the early 1930s the route was extended, with several segments of SR 26 added to the state system. The last major addition happen in the late 1930s between SR 9 and Hartford City. The entire roadway was paved in the 1960s. In December 2013, the Indiana Department of Transportation (INDOT) relinquished the road through West Lafayette and Lafayette to the two cities.

== Route description ==
SR 26 runs for 150.1 miles (241.6 km) as an almost entirely east–west undivided surface highway in central Indiana. Most of the highway is two-lane undivided rural highway. There is a section east of Lafayette that is a four-lane highway. The road exists in two segments with the first running between the Illinois border, near the town of Ambia, and near West Lafayette. The second segment is routed between Lafayette and the Ohio border.

=== Western segment ===
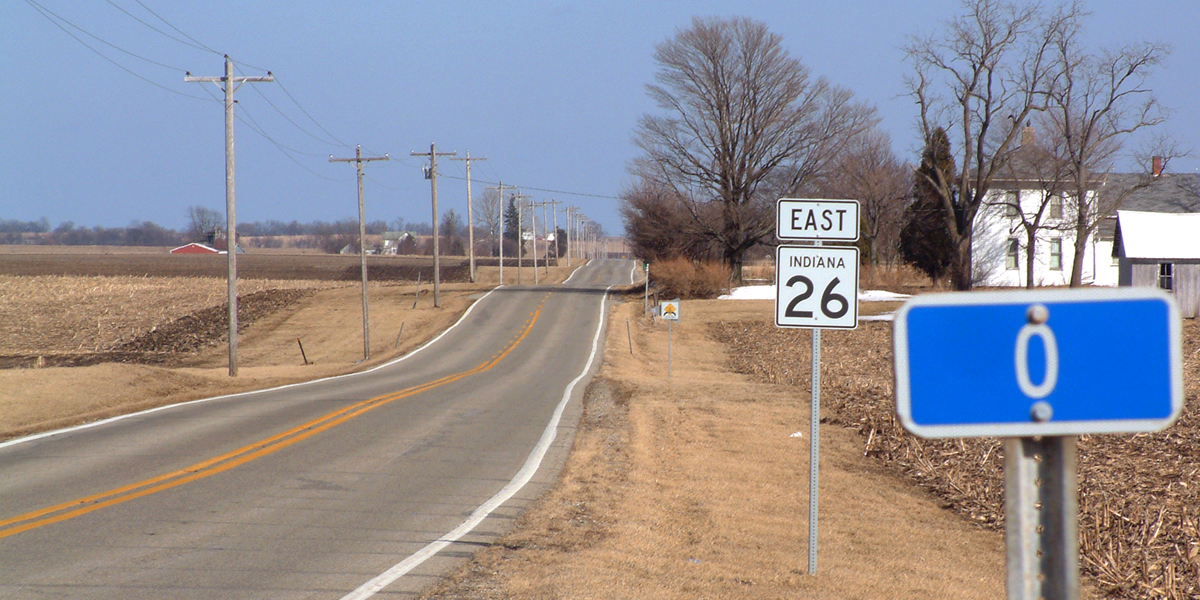
Mile zero at the Indiana-Illinois border.

SR 26 is a two-lane highway that connects with Illinois Route 9 and SR 352 at the Illinois state line in western Warren County. The road heads east passing through agricultural land, before turning south concurrent with U.S. Route 41 (US 41). The concurrency heads southeast, before SR 26 leaves the concurrency heading east towards Lafayette. The road makes a few curves, but the roadway stays generally east–west in direction. North of Pine Village SR 26 joins SR 55. The concurrency enters town on Main Street. At the intersection of Main Street and Lafayette Street, SR 26 turns east onto Lafayette Street, while SR 55 continues south on Main Street. The street passes some businesses before reaching the east side of town. The road enters rural Warren County before entering rural Tippecanoe County. The highway turns towards the southwest before passing by many houses on the west edge of West Lafayette. SR 26 passes north of Purdue University Forestry and Natural Resources Farm, before an intersection with US 52/US 231. At this intersection the SR 26 designation ends, but the roadway continues east as State Street, passing through West Lafayette and heading towards Lafayette.

=== Eastern segment ===
The eastern segment of SR 26 begins, as a continuation of South Street, at an interchange with I-65 on the east side of Lafayette. The road heads east as a four-lane highway, passing through both commercial and residential properties. As the road continues east it becomes a two-lane road, with some curves, and passes through farmland. The highway enters rural Clinton County, before entering Rossville. In Rossville SR 26 is concurrent with Main Street and passes through a business district. The business district becomes houses as the street heads east. The road enters the downtown area of Rossville passing through an intersection with Plank Street (US 421/SR 39). East of Plank Street, SR 26 passes more houses before leaving Rossville. East of Rossville, SR 26 passes through agricultural land, heading due east towards Kokomo. In rural Clinton County SR 26 has an intersection with SR 75, before passing through Sedalia and Geetingsville. The road enters Middlefork and has an intersection with SR 29. East of Middlefork the highway enters Howard County.

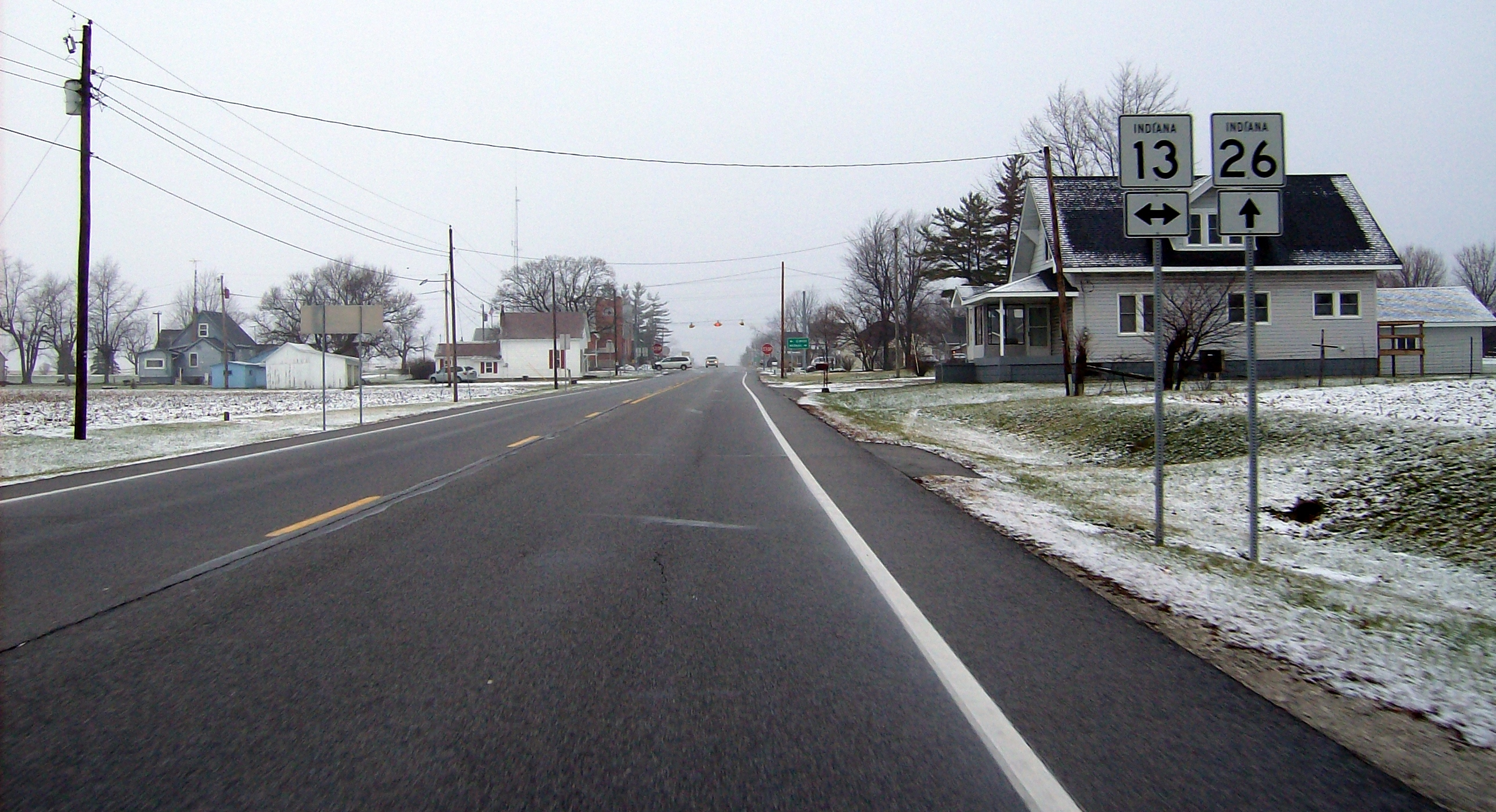
SR 26 through Point Isabel.

In Howard County the road enters Russiaville, passing through town on Main Street. While in Russiaville, Main Street passes through commercial and residential properties. SR 26 leaves Russiaville and enters rural Howard County, passing through mostly farmland. The road enters Kokomo, passing through the Indian Heights neighborhood. While in Indian Heights the road passes through an intersection with SR 931. East of SR 931, SR 26 leaves Kokomo and passes through the community of Oakford. After passing through Oakford, SR 26 has an interchange with US 31, before passing through rural Howard County, having intersections with SR 19 and SR 213.

The road leaves Howard County and enters Grant County and passes through an intersection with SR 13, in Point Isabel. East of Point Isabel SR 26 has an intersection with SR 37 and SR 9, before entering Fairmount. In Fairmount SR 26 is routed along Eighth Street and passes through residential part of town. Before leaving town the street has an at-grade crossing with a Norfolk Southern railroad track. East of Fairmount SR 26 has an interchange with I-69, before crossing over the Mississinewa River. After the river SR 26 turns north at a four-way intersection with County Road 900 South and County Road 950 East, formerly SR 221. SR 26 heads north for about 2 miles (3.2 km) towards the town of Upland, before turning east at a four-way intersection with SR 22 and County Road 700 South, southeast of Taylor University. The road then leaves Grant County and enters Blackford County.

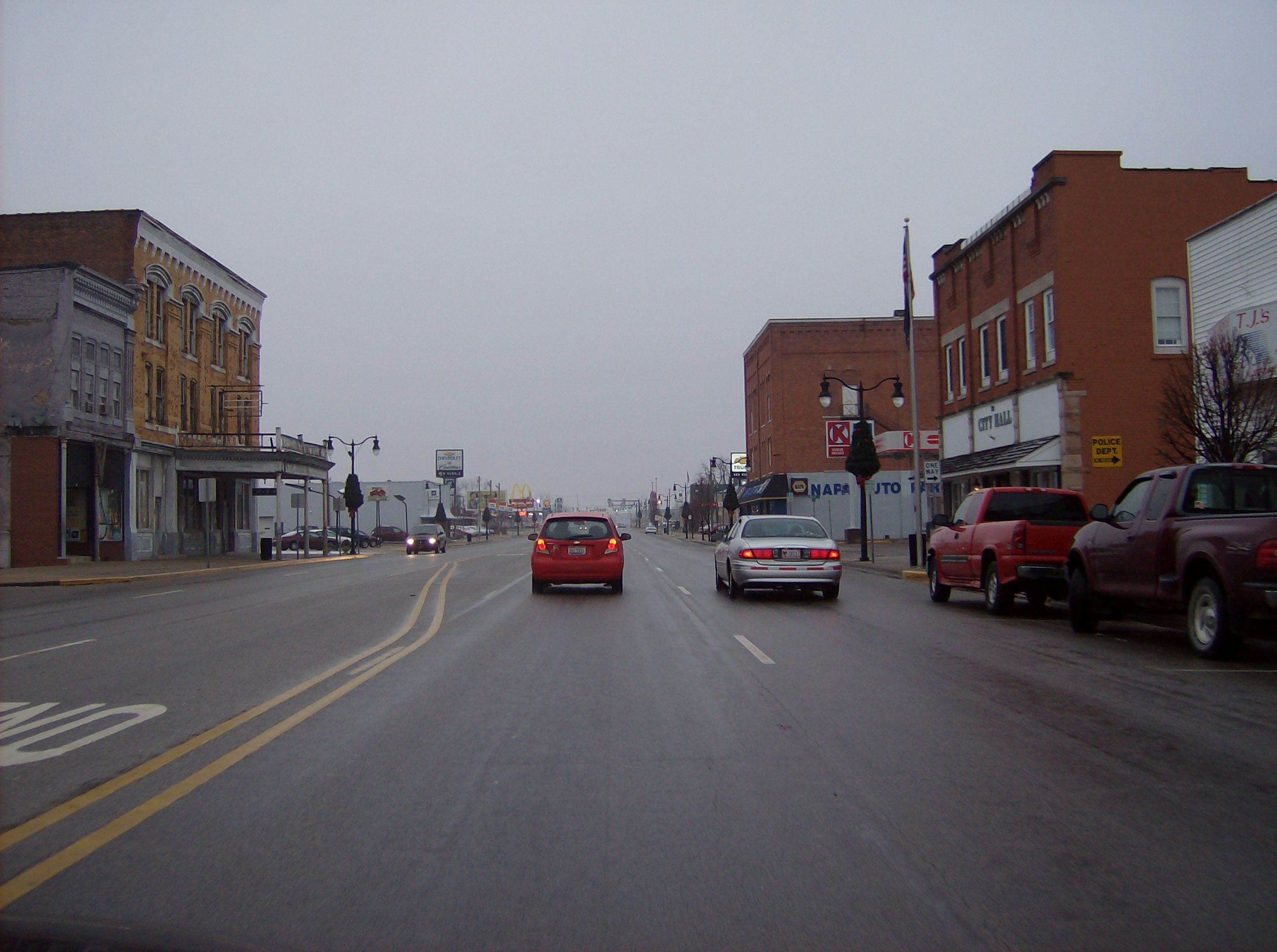
Meridian Street in Portland.

SR 26 then enters Hartford City on Water Street before curving onto Washington Street, prior to an intersection with SR 3. East of SR 3, Washington Street enters the Hartford City Courthouse Square Historic District and passes on the south side of the Blackford County Courthouse. SR 26 leaves the historic district and turns south on Mill Street for one block, before turning east onto Water Street and crossing a Norfolk Southern Railroad track. The highway leaves Hartford City and enters rural Blackford County, before coming to an intersection with the north end of SR 167 at the Blackford–Jay county line. SR 26 joins SR 1 for a short distance heading south, before SR 26 turns east towards Portland. The road joins SR 67 before entering Portland. The two state roads enter Portland on Votaw Street, passing through mostly commercial lots. At US 27 (Meridian Street) SR 67 turns north concurrent with US 27, while SR 26 turns south concurrent with US 27. Meridian Street heads south passing through the Portland Commercial Historic District, about a block east of the Jay County Courthouse. SR 26 turns east on Water Street, while US 27 continues south across the Salamonie River. Water Street leaves the historic district and passes through a residential part of town, before leaving Portland. As the road leaves Portland it crosses over the Salamonie River. East of Portland SR 26 parallels the Salamonie River, before the highway crosses over the river again. The road passes through agricultural land, before the Ohio state lines the road curves towards the southeast. SR 26 ends at the Ohio–Indiana border, just outside of Fort Recovery, the roadway continues east into Ohio as State Route 119.

== History ==
SR 26 was originally designated between Bloomington and Madison along approximately the modern alignment of SR 46 and SR 7. The highway ran between SR 22 in Bloomington and SR 40 in Madison, passing through Columbus. When the Indiana State Highway Commission renumber the state road system in 1926 in coordination with the creation of the United States Numbered Highway System, the SR 26 designated was moved north to its modern alignment.

The modern SR 26 was designated on October 1, 1926, on a route that ran between Lafayette and Oakford, this route was previously known as SR 29. The modern route of SR 26 between the Indiana–Illinois state line and US 41 was added between 1927 and 1928, as SR 22. During 1930 a state road was proposed between US 41 and Lafayette and between US 31 and SR 9. Also at this time a state road was proposed from Upland east to the Ohio–Indiana state line. Between late 1930 and early 1932 the highway commission added SR 26 between US 31 and SR 9 to the state road system and the SR 22 designation west of US 41 was changed to SR 26. During this time frame SR 26 was added to the state road system between Hartford City and SR 67 and the modern route of SR 26 between the modern eastern end of SR 22 and Hartford City became part of SR 22. During 1932 the proposed route between Portland and the Ohio–Indiana state line was commissioned as part of SR 26 and the small north–south segment of modern SR 26, southeast of Upland, was commissioned as part of SR 221. SR 26 proposed to be extended east from SR 9 to SR 221 between 1936 and 1937. The road was extended from SR 9 to Hartford City between late 1938 and early 1939. The entire road was paved between 1966 and 1967.

SR 26 formerly passed through the campus of Purdue University in West Lafayette, where it was concurrent with State Street, and through Lafayette as South Street and Columbia Street. The segment of roadway between the US 231 junction in the west and Interstate 65 interchange in the east were relinquished to the cities of West Lafayette and Lafayette in December 2013; SR 26 is now discontinuous.

== Major intersections ==
County	Location	mi	km	Destinations	Notes
Vermilion	Grant Township			IL 9 west – Hoopeston	Continuation into Illinois
Warren–Vermilion county line	Indiana–Illinois line	0.000	0.000	SR 352 – Ambia	Western terminus
Warren	Pine Township	7.866	12.659	US 41 north – Kentland, Fowler	West end of US 41 concurrency
Warren	Pine Township	8.406	13.528	US 41 south – Attica	East end of US 41 concurrency
Warren	Adams Township	15.703	25.272	SR 55 north – Oxford	West end of SR 55 concurrency
Warren	Pine Village	15.941	25.655	SR 55 south – Attica	East end of SR 55 concurrency
Tippecanoe	Wabash Township	29.857	48.050	US 52 / US 231	
Tippecanoe	Gap in route				
Tippecanoe	Lafayette	29.858– 30.005	48.052– 48.288	I-65 – Chicago, Indianapolis	I-65 exit 172
Clinton	Rossville	51.709	83.218	US 421 / SR 39 (Plank Street)	
Clinton	Owen Township	55.279	88.963	SR 75 – Flora, Frankfort	
Clinton	Middlefork	62.261	100.199	SR 29 – Logansport, Indianapolis	
Howard	Kokomo	76.321	122.827	SR 931	
Howard	Taylor Township	78.052– 78.199	125.613– 125.849	US 31 – South Bend, Indianapolis	US 31 exit 158
Howard	Taylor Township	81.300	130.840	SR 19 – Tipton	
Howard	Union Township	85.292	137.264	SR 213 – Greentown, Windfall	
Grant	Point Isabel	92.252	148.465	SR 13 – Wabash, Elwood	
Grant	Liberty Township	96.927	155.989	SR 37 – Marion, Indianapolis	
Grant	Liberty–Fairmount township line	100.248	161.334	SR 9 – Marion, Anderson	
Grant	Jefferson Township	106.666– 106.814	171.662– 171.900	I-69 / US 35 – Fort Wayne, Indianapolis	I-69 exit 255
Grant	Upland	111.747	179.839	SR 22 west – Upland	Eastern terminus of SR 22
Blackford	Hartford City	118.263	190.326	SR 3 (Walnut Street)	
Blackford–Jay county line	Jackson–Knox township line	126.960	204.322	SR 167 south – Dunkirk	Northern terminus of SR 167
Jay	Knox Township	129.914	209.076	SR 1 north	west end of SR 1 concurrency
Jay	Knox Township	130.000	209.215	SR 1 south	east end of SR 1 concurrency
Jay	Wayne Township	138.010	222.106	SR 67 south	Western end of SR 67 concurrency
Jay	Portland	139.972	225.263	US 27 north / SR 67 north (Meridian Street)	Eastern end of SR 67 concurrency; west end of US 27 concurrency
Jay	Portland	140.006	225.318	US 27 south (Meridian Street)	east end of US 27 concurrency
Jay	Noble Township	150.100	241.563	SR 119 east – Fort Recovery	Ohio state line
1.000 mi = 1.609 km; 1.000 km = 0.621 mi: Concurrency terminus
