= Owasco, Indiana =

Owasco
- Unincorporated community
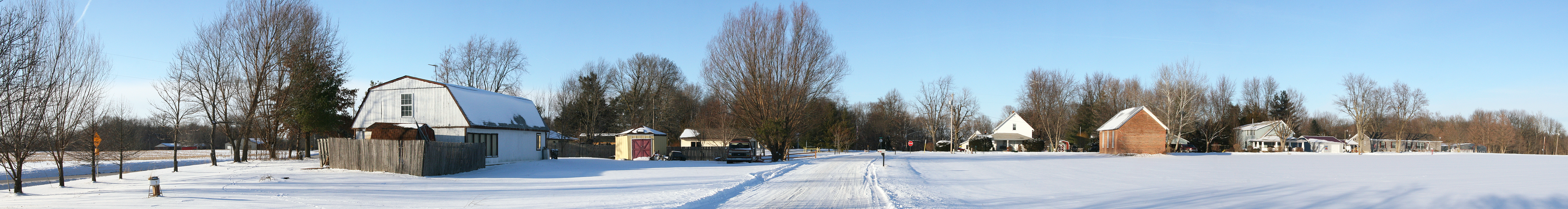
- Looking north along Front Street into Owasco

- Carroll County's location in Indiana

- Location in Carroll County
- Coordinates: 40°27′39″N 86°37′41″W
- Country: United States
- State: Indiana
- County: Carroll
- Township: Clay
- Elevation: 705 ft (215 m)
- ZIP code: 46065
- FIPS code: 18-57420
- GNIS feature ID: 440788

Owasco is an unincorporated community in Clay Township, Carroll County, Indiana. It is part of the Lafayette, Indiana Metropolitan Statistical Area.

== History ==
A post office was established at Owasco in 1883. It was named after Owasco Lake, in New York.
