= Hamilton, Clinton County, Indiana =

Hamilton
- Unincorporated community
- Location within Clinton County, Indiana
- Coordinates: 40°20′41″N 86°37′05″W
- Country: United States
- State: Indiana
- County: Clinton
- Township: Madison
- Founded: 1839
- Named for: Alexander Hamilton
- Elevation: 807 ft (246 m)
- ZIP code: 46058
- FIPS code: 18-30582
- GNIS feature ID: 435637

Hamilton is an unincorporated community in Madison Township, Clinton County, Indiana. The town is named for Alexander Hamilton.

== History ==
The western portion of the land on which Hamilton stands was settled by Jacob Stetler in late 1829 or 1830, and the eastern part by John Gallinger in 1831, the two being separated by what is now Hamilton Road (near its intersection with what would become State Road 38). According to a 1913 history of Clinton County, "tradition has it that these two men met under the shade of a tree, near where the two highways cross, on a Sunday and agreed to join in layout out the town plat, which agreement was thereafter carried to execution..." The plat, surveyed March 21, 1839 and recorded April 19, 1839, included 36 lots each on the east and west sides of the road; additional lots were added June 30, 1842.

The first house in Hamilton was built by John Jamison, a saddler, who also ran a small shop. Later stores were operated by Waldron Drew, Mr. Frankenfield, and many others. Harvey Blacklidge operated the first blacksmith shop and was succeeded by Samuel Hammel who occupied the position of village blacksmith for many years. One of the most prominent people in Mulberry's early history was the village physician Dr. John Connor, "a very large, fleshy man, weighing perhaps three hundred pounds, though not tall. Seated on his two-wheeled cart and drawn by a fine sorrel horse, he was a familiar figure to all of the people living within several miles of the village." Other prominent early citizens included cobbler Alfred Cornelison, who being disabled and unable to walk drove a dog team, James McDavis, Joseph Miller, Hamilton Yundt, Joseph Rex, Jonas Hammel, Jesse Sweet, Joseph Kauffman and William Sense.

Hamilton reached a population of more than a hundred and was an active business center for the community, but it was eclipsed by nearby Mulberry which had the only railroad station in the township, and gradually dwindled during the late 19th and early 20th centuries. It now consists of about a dozen homes.
