= Avery, Indiana =

Avery
- Unincorporated community
- Location within Clinton County, Indiana
- Coordinates: 40°18′32″N 86°26′26″W
- Country: United States
- State: Indiana
- County: Clinton
- Township: Michigan
- Elevation: 879 ft (268 m)
- ZIP code: 46041
- FIPS code: 18-02854
- GNIS feature ID: 430354

Avery is an unincorporated community in Michigan Township, Clinton County, Indiana.

== History ==
A post office was established at Avery in 1879, and remained in operation until it was discontinued in 1903. The community was named for Jacob Avery, a pioneer settler.
