= Michigantown, Indiana =

- Town
- Location of Michigantown in Clinton County, Indiana.
- Coordinates: 40°19′41″N 86°23′30″W
- Country: United States
- State: Indiana
- County: Clinton
- Township: Michigan
- Founded: 1830

Area
  - Total: 0.27 sq mi (0.70 km^{2})
  - Land: 0.27 sq mi (0.70 km^{2})
  - Water: 0 sq mi (0.00 km^{2})
- Elevation: 873 ft (266 m)

Population (2020)
  - Total: 441
  - Density: 1,628/sq mi (628.5/km^{2})
- Time zone: UTC-5 (Eastern (EST))
  - Summer (DST): UTC-4 (EDT)
- ZIP code: 46057
- Area code: 765
- FIPS code: 18-48816
- GNIS feature ID: 2396757
- Website: Town of Michigantown

Michigantown is a town in Michigan Township, Clinton County, Indiana, United States. As of the 2020 census, Michigantown had a population of 441. The town was named for the Michigan Road, an early thoroughfare through the area.

== History ==
Joseph Hill and Robert Edwards platted Michigantown in 1830 with lots on both sides of the Michigan Road; additions made in 1874 and 1876 by William Lowden added more lots to the north, bringing the edge of town up to what was then the Frankfort and Kokomo Railroad (later the Toledo, St. Louis and Western). In 1912 the Marion, Kokomo and Frankfort Electric Railroad built a line that paralleled the other through town.

Michigantown was incorporated in the early 1870s. The northern part of town was sometimes referred to as Lowdenville.

== Geography ==
A Norfolk Southern Railway line crosses the northern edge of town and connects the cities of Frankfort and Kokomo.

According to the 2010 census, Michigantown has a total area of 0.26 square miles (0.67 km^{2}), all land.

== Demographics ==
Historical population
Census	Pop.	Note	%±
1850	148		—
1870	315		—
1880	342		8.6%
1890	298		−12.9%
1900	417		39.9%
1910	395		−5.3%
1920	430		8.9%
1930	419		−2.6%
1940	417		−0.5%
1950	443		6.2%
1960	513		15.8%
1970	457		−10.9%
1980	453		−0.9%
1990	472		4.2%
2000	406		−14.0%
2010	467		15.0%
2020	441		−5.6%
U.S. Decennial Census

=== 2010 census ===
As of the census of 2010, there were 467 people, 183 households, and 134 families living in the town. The population density was 1,796.2 inhabitants per square mile (693.5/km^{2}). There were 205 housing units at an average density of 788.5 per square mile (304.4/km^{2}). The racial makeup of the town was 97.9% White, 0.4% African American, 0.4% Asian, 0.4% from other races, and 0.9% from two or more races. Hispanic or Latino of any race were 2.6% of the population.

There were 183 households, of which 37.7% had children under the age of 18 living with them, 51.9% were married couples living together, 17.5% had a female householder with no husband present, 3.8% had a male householder with no wife present, and 26.8% were non-families. 21.9% of all households were made up of individuals, and 11.5% had someone living alone who was 65 years of age or older. The average household size was 2.55 and the average family size was 2.93.

The median age in the town was 34.1 years. 27% of residents were under the age of 18; 10.3% were between the ages of 18 and 24; 25.7% were from 25 to 44; 23.4% were from 45 to 64; and 13.7% were 65 years of age or older. The gender makeup of the town was 48.0% male and 52.0% female.

=== 2000 census ===
As of the census of 2000, there were 406 people, 155 households, and 117 families living in the town. The population density was 1,533.6 inhabitants per square mile (592.1/km^{2}). There were 164 housing units at an average density of 619.5 per square mile (239.2/km^{2}). The racial makeup of the town was 99.26% White, 0.25% Native American, 0.25% from other races, and 0.25% from two or more races. Hispanic or Latino of any race were 0.74% of the population.

There were 155 households, out of which 41.3% had children under the age of 18 living with them, 54.8% were married couples living together, 18.1% had a female householder with no husband present, and 24.5% were non-families. 22.6% of all households were made up of individuals, and 14.2% had someone living alone who was 65 years of age or older. The average household size was 2.62 and the average family size was 3.03.

In the town, the population was spread out, with 30.0% under the age of 18, 6.7% from 18 to 24, 31.3% from 25 to 44, 16.5% from 45 to 64, and 15.5% who were 65 years of age or older. The median age was 34 years. For every 100 females, there were 88.8 males. For every 100 females age 18 and over, there were 79.7 males.

The median income for a household in the town was $37,500, and the median income for a family was $45,625. Males had a median income of $32,656 versus $23,750 for females. The per capita income for the town was $21,102. About 2.5% of families and 5.0% of the population were below the poverty line, including 5.0% of those under age 18 and none of those age 65 or over.
