= Clinton County, Indiana =

County in Indiana, United States

- County
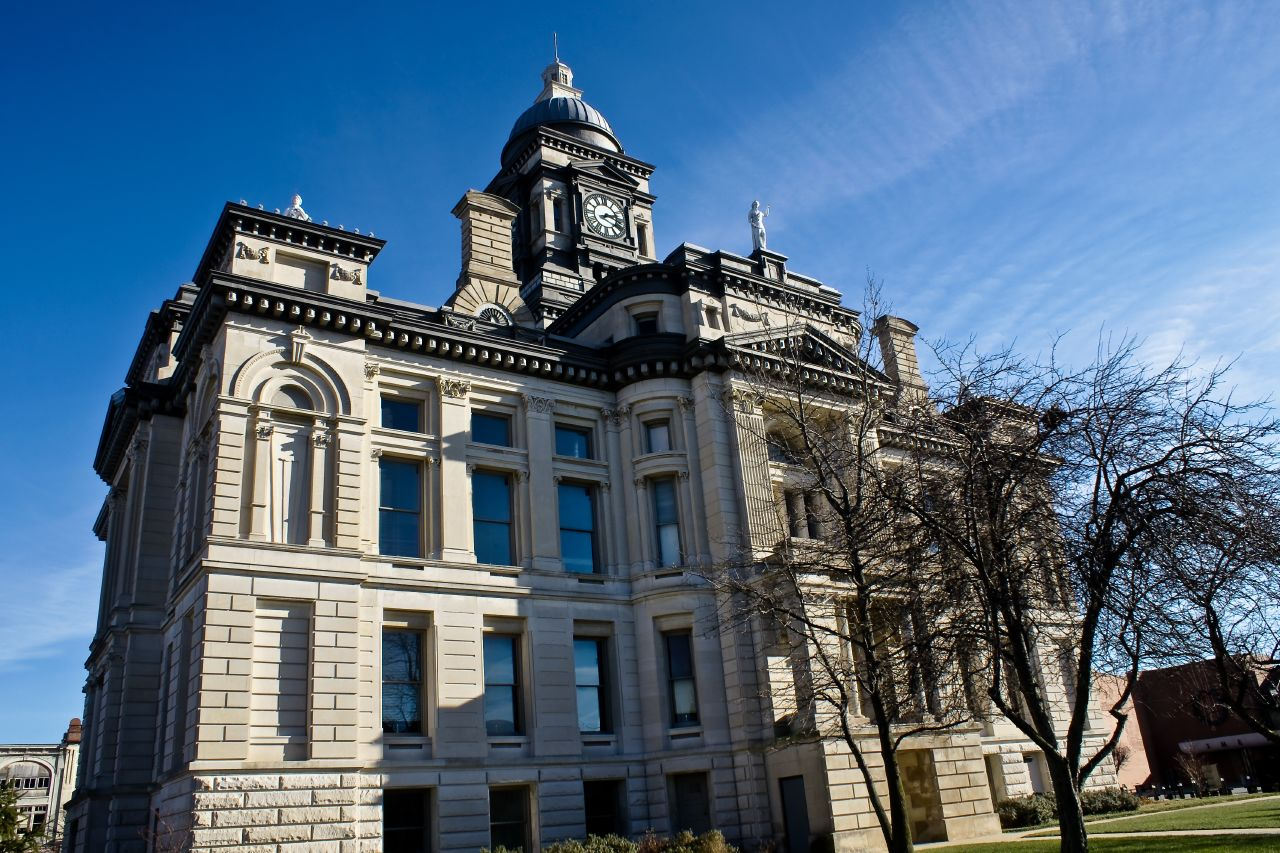
- Clinton County Courthouse in Frankfort, Indiana

- Seal

- Location within the U.S. state of Indiana
- Coordinates: 40°18′N 86°29′W
- Country: United States
- State: Indiana
- Founded: 1830
- Named for: DeWitt Clinton
- Seat: Frankfort
- Largest city: Frankfort

Area
  - Total: 405.25 sq mi (1,049.6 km^{2})
  - Land: 405.07 sq mi (1,049.1 km^{2})
  - Water: 0.18 sq mi (0.47 km^{2}) 0.04%

Population (2020)
  - Total: 33,190
  - Estimate (2025): 33,322 ▲
  - Density: 81.94/sq mi (31.64/km^{2})
- Time zone: UTC−5 (Eastern)
  - Summer (DST): UTC−4 (EDT)
- Congressional district: 4th
- Website: www.clintonco.com
- Indiana county number 12

Clinton County is a county located in the U.S. state of Indiana. As of 2020, the population was 33,190. The county seat is Frankfort.

== History ==
Clinton County officially came into existence on March 1, 1830, and was named in honor of DeWitt Clinton, the sixth Governor of New York State and architect of the Erie Canal, which opened up the Upper Midwest to settlement. The act forming the county was approved by the Indiana General Assembly on January 29, 1830, and created Clinton from the eastern parts of neighboring Tippecanoe County.

Lieutenant General James F. Record was born and raised in Clinton County; Gen Record was awarded 3x Distinguished Service Crosses for his gallantry during the Vietnam War.

== Geography ==
According to the 2010 census, the county has a total area of 405.25 square miles (1,049.6 km^{2}), of which 405.07 square miles (1,049.1 km^{2}) (or 99.96%) is land and 0.18 square miles (0.47 km^{2}) (or 0.04%) is water.

=== Adjacent counties ===
- Carroll County (north)
- Howard County (northeast)
- Tipton County (east)
- Hamilton County (southeast)
- Boone County (south)
- Montgomery County (southwest)
- Tippecanoe County (west)

=== Cities and towns ===
- Colfax
- Frankfort
- Kirklin
- Michigantown
- Mulberry
- Rossville

=== Unincorporated towns ===
- Antioch
- Avery
- Beard
- Boyleston
- Cambria
- Cyclone
- Edna Mills
- Fickle
- Forest
- Geetingsville
- Hamilton
- Hillisburg
- Jefferson
- Kilmore
- Manson
- Middlefork
- Moran
- Pickard
- Scircleville
- Sedalia

=== Extinct towns ===
- Berlin
- Martinsville
- Prairieville

=== Townships ===
- Center
- Forest
- Jackson
- Johnson
- Kirklin
- Madison
- Michigan
- Owen
- Perry
- Ross
- Sugar Creek
- Union
- Warren
- Washington

=== Major highways ===
- Interstate 65
- U.S. Route 52
- U.S. Route 421
- Indiana State Road 26
- Indiana State Road 28
- Indiana State Road 29
- Indiana State Road 38
- Indiana State Road 39
- Indiana State Road 75

=== Airport ===
Clinton County is served by the Frankfort Municipal Airport.

=== Railroads ===
- CSX Transportation
- Norfolk Southern Railway

== Climate and weather ==
Frankfort, Indiana

Climate chart (precipitation, max. and min. temperature)
J	F	M	A	M	J	J	A	S	O	N	D
2.1 32 16	2 38 20	3.2 49 30	3.6 61 39	4.1 72 50	4.5 81 59	4.1 84 63	4 82 61	3 76 53	2.9 64 42	3.4 50 33	2.9 37 22
- █ Average max. and min. temperatures in °F
- █ Precipitation totals in inches
- Source: The Weather Channel
Metric conversion
J	F	M	A	M	J	J	A	S	O	N	D
53 0 −9	52 3 −7	80 9 −1	91 16 4	104 22 10	115 27 15	103 29 17	101 28 16	76 24 12	73 18 6	85 10 1	74 3 −6
- █ Average max. and min. temperatures in °C
- █ Precipitation totals in mm

In recent years, average temperatures in Frankfort have ranged from a low of 16 °F (−9 °C) in January to a high of 84 °F (29 °C) in July, although a record low of −26 °F (−32 °C) was recorded in December 1983 and a record high of 105 °F (41 °C) was recorded in July 1980. Average monthly precipitation ranged from 2.03 inches (52 mm) in February to 4.51 inches (115 mm) in June.

== Government ==
The county government is a constitutional body, and is granted specific powers by the Constitution of Indiana, and by the Indiana Code.

County Council: The county council is the legislative branch of the county government and controls all the spending and revenue collection in the county. Representatives are elected from county districts. The council members serve four-year terms. They are responsible for setting salaries, the annual budget, and special spending. The council also has limited authority to impose local taxes, in the form of an income and property tax that is subject to state level approval, excise taxes, and service taxes.

Board of Commissioners: The executive body of the county is made of a board of commissioners. The commissioners are elected county-wide, in staggered terms, and each serves a four-year term. One of the commissioners, typically the most senior, serves as president. The commissioners are charged with executing the acts legislated by the council, collecting revenue, and managing the day-to-day functions of the county government.

Court: The county maintains a small claims court that can handle some civil cases. The judge on the court is elected to a term of four years and must be a member of the Indiana Bar Association. The judge is assisted by a constable who is also elected to a four-year term. In some cases, court decisions can be appealed to the state-level circuit court.

County Officials: The county has several other elected offices, including sheriff, coroner, auditor, treasurer, recorder, surveyor, and circuit court clerk. Each of these elected officers serves a term of four years and oversees a different part of county government. Members elected to county government positions are required to declare a party affiliation and to be residents of the county.

Clinton County is part of Indiana's 4th congressional district; Indiana Senate districts 7 and 23; and Indiana House of Representatives district 38.

United States presidential election results for Clinton County, Indiana
Year	Republican		Democratic		Third party(ies)	
Year	No.	%	No.	%	No.	%
1888	3,519	50.50%	3,278	47.04%	171	2.45%
1892	3,222	47.03%	3,006	43.88%	623	9.09%
1896	3,607	48.38%	3,747	50.26%	101	1.35%
1900	3,677	48.78%	3,603	47.80%	258	3.42%
1904	4,053	53.10%	3,112	40.77%	468	6.13%
1908	3,626	47.20%	3,680	47.90%	376	4.89%
1912	2,182	30.52%	3,255	45.52%	1,713	23.96%
1916	3,638	47.76%	3,662	48.07%	318	4.17%
1920	7,739	52.59%	6,721	45.67%	257	1.75%
1924	7,469	53.88%	6,070	43.79%	323	2.33%
1928	7,606	55.89%	5,895	43.31%	109	0.80%
1932	6,288	42.56%	8,314	56.27%	174	1.18%
1936	7,265	46.19%	8,340	53.02%	125	0.79%
1940	8,610	52.36%	7,732	47.02%	102	0.62%
1944	8,087	55.37%	6,381	43.69%	137	0.94%
1948	7,762	52.02%	7,001	46.92%	158	1.06%
1952	10,057	60.14%	6,469	38.68%	198	1.18%
1956	9,690	60.44%	6,268	39.10%	74	0.46%
1960	9,620	59.32%	6,533	40.28%	64	0.39%
1964	7,157	45.93%	8,353	53.61%	72	0.46%
1968	7,929	53.91%	5,714	38.85%	1,064	7.23%
1972	9,849	69.42%	4,283	30.19%	55	0.39%
1976	8,199	54.80%	6,662	44.52%	102	0.68%
1980	8,158	58.43%	5,258	37.66%	546	3.91%
1984	8,969	67.12%	4,329	32.40%	65	0.49%
1988	8,570	65.82%	4,412	33.88%	39	0.30%
1992	6,141	50.24%	3,490	28.55%	2,593	21.21%
1996	6,156	53.20%	3,949	34.13%	1,466	12.67%
2000	7,141	64.97%	3,643	33.15%	207	1.88%
2004	8,471	71.32%	3,335	28.08%	71	0.60%
2008	6,919	55.79%	5,307	42.79%	175	1.41%
2012	6,338	64.13%	3,308	33.47%	237	2.40%
2016	8,531	71.15%	2,819	23.51%	641	5.35%
2020	9,334	72.02%	3,361	25.93%	266	2.05%
2024	9,108	73.16%	3,135	25.18%	207	1.66%

== Demographics ==
Historical population
Census	Pop.	Note	%±
1830	1,423		—
1840	7,508		427.6%
1850	11,869		58.1%
1860	14,505		22.2%
1870	17,330		19.5%
1880	23,472		35.4%
1890	27,370		16.6%
1900	28,202		3.0%
1910	26,674		−5.4%
1920	27,737		4.0%
1930	27,329		−1.5%
1940	28,411		4.0%
1950	29,734		4.7%
1960	30,765		3.5%
1970	30,547		−0.7%
1980	31,545		3.3%
1990	30,974		−1.8%
2000	33,866		9.3%
2010	33,224		−1.9%
2020	33,190		−0.1%
2025 (est.)	33,322	▲	0.4%
U.S. Decennial Census; 1790-1960 1900-1990; 1990-2000 2010

=== Racial and ethnic composition ===
Clinton County, Indiana – Racial and ethnic composition Note: the US Census treats Hispanic/Latino as an ethnic category. This table excludes Latinos from the racial categories and assigns them to a separate category. Hispanics/Latinos may be of any race.
Race / Ethnicity (NH = Non-Hispanic)	Pop 1980	Pop 1990	Pop 2000	Pop 2010	Pop 2020	% 1980	% 1990	% 2000	% 2010	% 2020
White alone (NH)	31,041	30,378	31,052	28,349	25,808	98.40%	98.08%	91.69%	85.33%	77.76%
Black or African American alone (NH)	13	33	67	138	196	0.04%	0.11%	0.20%	0.42%	0.59%
Native American or Alaska Native alone (NH)	23	50	43	44	62	0.07%	0.16%	0.13%	0.13%	0.19%
Asian alone (NH)	46	59	63	65	70	0.15%	0.19%	0.19%	0.20%	0.21%
Native Hawaiian or Pacific Islander alone (NH)	x	x	4	3	13	x	x	0.01%	0.01%	0.04%
Other race alone (NH)	0	1	5	25	46	0.00%	0.00%	0.01%	0.08%	0.14%
Mixed race or Multiracial (NH)	x	x	154	205	853	x	x	0.45%	0.62%	2.57%
Hispanic or Latino (any race)	422	453	2,478	4,395	6,142	1.34%	1.46%	7.32%	13.23%	18.51%
Total	31,545	30,974	33,866	33,224	33,190	100.00%	100.00%	100.00%	100.00%	100.00%

=== 2020 census ===
As of the 2020 census, the county had a population of 33,190. The median age was 38.3 years. 26.0% of residents were under the age of 18 and 17.2% of residents were 65 years of age or older. For every 100 females there were 98.3 males, and for every 100 females age 18 and over there were 95.9 males age 18 and over.

The racial makeup of the county was 80.9% White, 0.6% Black or African American, 0.5% American Indian and Alaska Native, 0.2% Asian, <0.1% Native Hawaiian and Pacific Islander, 9.8% from some other race, and 7.9% from two or more races. Hispanic or Latino residents of any race comprised 18.5% of the population.

50.5% of residents lived in urban areas, while 49.5% lived in rural areas.

There were 12,421 households in the county, of which 34.0% had children under the age of 18 living in them. Of all households, 51.3% were married-couple households, 17.5% were households with a male householder and no spouse or partner present, and 23.1% were households with a female householder and no spouse or partner present. About 24.7% of all households were made up of individuals and 11.5% had someone living alone who was 65 years of age or older.

There were 13,450 housing units, of which 7.7% were vacant. Among occupied housing units, 71.8% were owner-occupied and 28.2% were renter-occupied. The homeowner vacancy rate was 0.9% and the rental vacancy rate was 7.5%.

=== 2010 census ===
As of the 2010 United States census, there were 33,224 people, 12,105 households, and 8,754 families residing in the county. The population density was 82.0 inhabitants per square mile (31.7/km^{2}). There were 13,321 housing units at an average density of 32.9 per square mile (12.7/km^{2}). The racial makeup of the county was 91.0% white, 0.4% black or African American, 0.2% Asian, 0.2% American Indian, 6.8% from other races, and 1.3% from two or more races. Those of Hispanic or Latino origin made up 13.2% of the population. In terms of ancestry, 22.4% were German, 11.1% were American, 10.3% were Irish, and 9.6% were English.

Of the 12,105 households, 36.1% had children under the age of 18 living with them, 55.5% were married couples living together, 11.1% had a female householder with no husband present, 27.7% were non-families, and 23.1% of all households were made up of individuals. The average household size was 2.68 and the average family size was 3.13. The median age was 37.5 years.

The median income for a household in the county was $47,697 and the median income for a family was $57,445. Males had a median income of $42,009 versus $29,086 for females. The per capita income for the county was $21,131. About 7.5% of families and 11.7% of the population were below the poverty line, including 17.0% of those under age 18 and 6.4% of those age 65 or over.

== See also ==
- National Register of Historic Places listings in Clinton County, Indiana
