= Pettit, Indiana =

- Unincorporated community
- Tippecanoe County's location in Indiana

- Location in Tippecanoe County
- Coordinates: 40°25′03″N 86°42′33″W
- Country: United States
- State: Indiana
- County: Tippecanoe
- Township: Perry
- Elevation: 673 ft (205 m)
- Time zone: UTC-5 (Eastern (EST))
  - Summer (DST): UTC-4 (EDT)
- ZIP code: 47905
- Area code: 765
- GNIS feature ID: 441066

Pettit is a small unincorporated community in Perry Township, Tippecanoe County, Indiana, located east by northeast of Dayton.

The community is part of the Lafayette, Indiana Metropolitan Statistical Area.

== History ==
A post office was established at Pettit in 1854, and remained in operation until it was discontinued in 1902.

== Geography ==
Pettit is located in Perry Township at an elevation of 673 feet.
