= Cambria, Indiana =

Cambria
- Unincorporated community
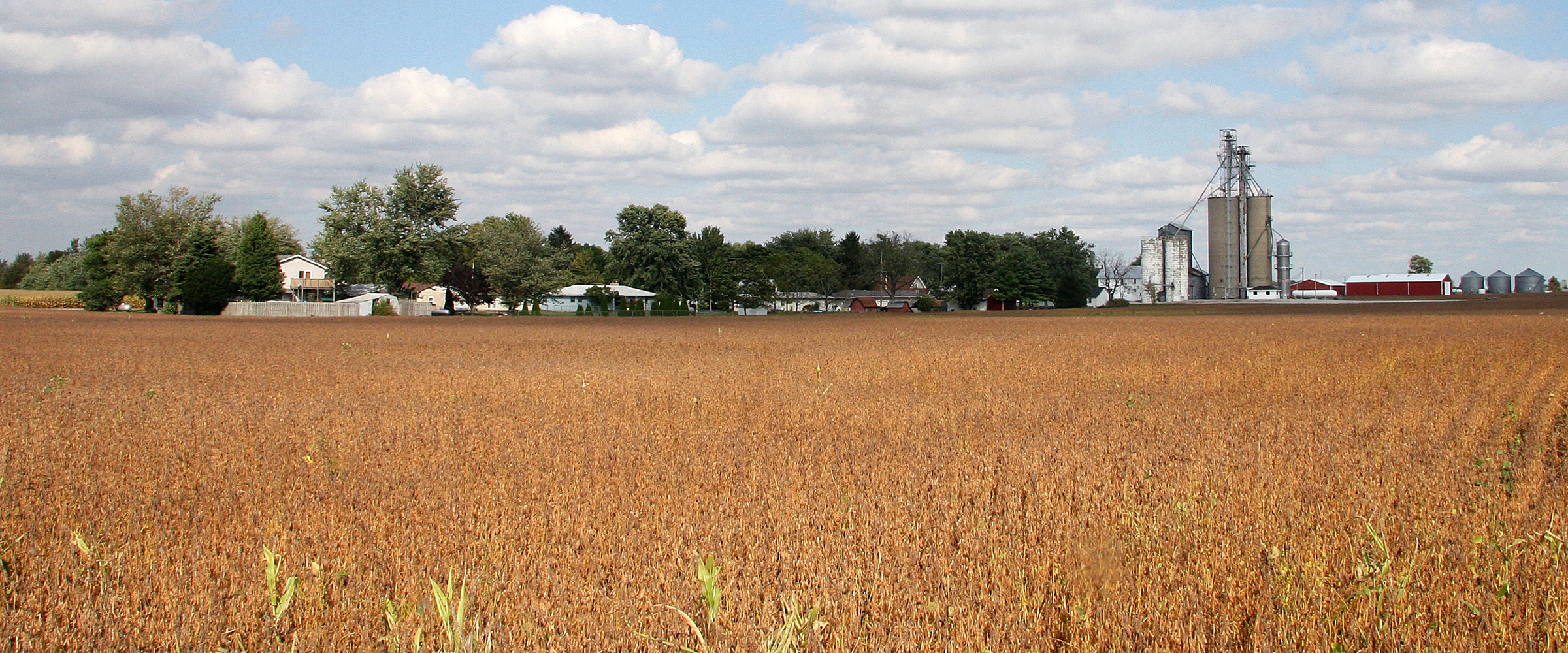

- Location within Clinton County, Indiana
- Coordinates: 40°21′57″N 86°33′33″W
- Country: United States
- State: Indiana
- County: Clinton
- Township: Owen
- Elevation: 820 ft (250 m)
- ZIP code: 46041
- FIPS code: 18-09856
- GNIS feature ID: 431998

Cambria is an unincorporated community in Owen Township, Clinton County, Indiana.

== History ==
Cambria was established as a station on the Monon Railroad which was built through the southwestern portion of Owen Township. Cambria is the classical name for Wales. A post office was established at Cambria in 1883, and remained in operation until it was discontinued in 1915.
