= Perry Township, Tippecanoe County, Indiana =

Perry Township
- Township
- Location in Tippecanoe County
- Coordinates: 40°25′54″N 86°45′06″W
- Country: United States
- State: Indiana
- County: Tippecanoe

Government
  - Type: Indiana township

Area
  - Total: 36.24 sq mi (93.9 km^{2})
  - Land: 36.08 sq mi (93.4 km^{2})
  - Water: 0.15 sq mi (0.39 km^{2}) 0.41%
- Elevation: 659 ft (201 m)

Population (2020)
  - Total: 9,070
  - Density: 198.5/sq mi (76.6/km^{2})
- Time zone: UTC-5 (Eastern (EST))
  - Summer (DST): UTC-4 (EDT)
- ZIP codes: 47905
- Area code: 765
- GNIS feature ID: 453725

Perry Township is one of thirteen townships in Tippecanoe County, Indiana, United States. As of the 2010 census, its population was 7,161 and it contained 2,782 housing units.

== History ==
Hershey House was listed on the National Register of Historic Places in 1978.

== Geography ==
According to the 2010 census, the township has a total area of 36.24 square miles (93.9 km^{2}), of which 36.08 square miles (93.4 km^{2}) (or 99.56%) is land and 0.15 square miles (0.39 km^{2}) (or 0.41%) is water.

=== Cities, towns, villages ===
- Lafayette (east edge)

=== Unincorporated communities ===
- Heath at 40.4611470°N 86.7333397°W
- Monitor at 40.4197581°N 86.7563958°W
- Pettit at 40.4175359°N 86.7091721°W

(This list is based on USGS (United States Geological Survey) data and may include former settlements.)

=== Adjacent townships ===
- Washington Township (north)
- Clay Township, Carroll County (east)
- Ross Township, Clinton County (east)
- Madison Township, Clinton County (southeast)
- Sheffield Township (south)
- Wea Township (southwest)
- Fairfield Township (west)

=== Cemeteries ===
The township contains these three cemeteries: Swank, Union and Zion.

=== Major highways ===
- Interstate 65

=== Airports and landing strips ===
- Halsmer Airport
- Wildcat Air Landing Area

== School districts ==
- Tippecanoe School Corporation

== Political districts ==
- Indiana's 4th congressional district
- State House District 41
- State Senate District 22
