= Boyleston, Indiana =

Boyleston
- Unincorporated community
- Location within Clinton County, Indiana
- Coordinates: 40°17′11″N 86°23′41″W
- Country: United States
- State: Indiana
- County: Clinton
- Township: Michigan
- Founded: 1875
- Named after: Lewis N. Boyle
- Elevation: 902 ft (275 m)
- ZIP code: 46057
- FIPS code: 18-06922
- GNIS feature ID: 431430

Boyleston is an unincorporated community in Michigan Township, Clinton County, Indiana.

== History ==
Lewis N. Boyle of Indianapolis platted the town of Boyleston on November 17, 1875, along the Lake Erie and Western Railroad. A post office was established at Boyleston in 1877, and remained in operation until it was discontinued in 1951.
