= Washington Township, Clinton County, Indiana =

Washington Township
- Township
- Location of Washington Township in Clinton County
- Coordinates: 40°17′16″N 86°36′43″W
- Country: United States
- State: Indiana
- County: Clinton
- Organized: 1830
- Named for: George Washington

Government
  - Type: Indiana township

Area
  - Total: 28.78 sq mi (74.5 km^{2})
  - Land: 28.74 sq mi (74.4 km^{2})
  - Water: 0.04 sq mi (0.10 km^{2})
- Elevation: 846 ft (258 m)

Population (2020)
  - Total: 1,063
  - Density: 36.99/sq mi (14.28/km^{2})
- FIPS code: 18-80486
- GNIS feature ID: 453989

Washington Township is one of fourteen townships in Clinton County, Indiana, United States. As of the 2020 census, its population was 1,063 (down from 1,098 at 2010) and it contained 446 housing units. The township was named for President George Washington.

== History ==
Before Clinton County existed, all of its territory, along with a small piece of what's now northern Boone County, was from 1828 to 1830 part of Tippecanoe County and known as Washington Township. When Clinton County was founded, this name was retained for the township then most settled. As established on May 15, 1830, it included all of Perry Township (which was cut off in 1834) and the south half of Madison (made separate in 1835).

William Clark, the first white settler to come to this area, arrived in 1826 and built a cabin just north of what later would become Jefferson. David Kilgore and family arrived the next year and settled nearby.

== Geography ==
According to the 2010 census, the township has a total area of 28.78 square miles (74.5 km^{2}), of which 28.74 square miles (74.4 km^{2}) (or 99.86%) is land and 0.04 square miles (0.10 km^{2}) (or 0.14%) is water.

=== Unincorporated towns ===
- Fickle
- Jefferson

=== Adjacent townships ===
- Ross Township (north)
- Center Township (east)
- Union Township (east)
- Jackson Township (southeast)
- Perry Township (south)
- Lauramie Township, Tippecanoe County (west)
- Sheffield Township, Tippecanoe County (west)
- Madison Township (northwest)

=== Major highways ===
- Interstate 65
- U.S. Route 421
- Indiana State Road 38

=== Cemeteries ===
The township contains three cemeteries: Abbot, Jefferson and Providence.
