= Michigan Township, Clinton County, Indiana =

Michigan Township
- Township
- Location of Michigan Township in Clinton County
- Coordinates: 40°19′06″N 86°24′18″W
- Country: United States
- State: Indiana
- County: Clinton
- Organized: 1831

Government
  - Type: Indiana township

Area
  - Total: 35.82 sq mi (92.8 km^{2})
  - Land: 35.82 sq mi (92.8 km^{2})
  - Water: 0 sq mi (0 km^{2})
- Elevation: 869 ft (265 m)

Population (2020)
  - Total: 1,585
  - Density: 44.25/sq mi (17.08/km^{2})
- FIPS code: 18-48762
- GNIS feature ID: 453620

Michigan Township is one of fourteen townships in Clinton County, Indiana. As of the 2020 census, its population was 1,585 (down from 1,649 at 2010) and it contained 673 housing units. The township was named for the Michigan Road, an early thoroughfare through the area.

== History ==
Mahlon Shinn and Robert Edwards were the township's first white settlers, arriving in 1830 and followed the same year by many more. The township was organized in March 1831.

== Geography ==
According to the 2010 census, the township has a total area of 35.82 square miles (92.8 km^{2}), all land. Prior to settlement the land was heavily timbered with oak, poplar, walnut, sugar maple, beech, elm, ironwood, dogwood and pawpaw.

=== Cities and towns ===
- Michigantown

=== Unincorporated towns ===
- Avery
- Boyleston

=== Adjacent townships ===
- Warren Township (north)
- Forest Township (northeast)
- Johnson Township (east)
- Kirklin Township (south)
- Jackson Township (southwest)
- Center Township (west)
- Union Township (west)
- Owen Township (northwest)

=== Major highways ===
- U.S. Route 421
- Indiana State Road 29

=== Cemeteries ===
The township contains seven cemeteries: Brandon, Hopewell Cemeteries, Layman, Layton, Old Whiteman, Paris and Whiteman.
