= Pyrmont, Indiana =

Pyrmont
- Unincorporated community
- Carroll County's location in Indiana

- Location in Carroll County
- Coordinates: 40°28′03″N 86°40′47″W
- Country: United States
- State: Indiana
- County: Carroll
- Township: Clay
- Elevation: 676 ft (206 m)
- ZIP code: 46923
- FIPS code: 18-62424
- GNIS feature ID: 441677

Pyrmont is an unincorporated community in Clay Township, Carroll County, Indiana.

== History ==
Pyrmont was likely named after Waldeck and Pyrmont, in Germany.

An historical marker, erected in 1977 by the Carroll County Historical Society at the principal intersection in Pyrmont gives some of its history:

John Wagner built a dam, race and saw mill about a mile South in 1833 and added a grist mill. He sold to John Fisher who sold to John Fetterhoff who built a large frame mill. Joel Wagoner, James Allen, Elias Morkert, J. J. Cripe, Wm. Gardner, Bert Smoker were later operators. It burned December 7, 1929. Fetterhoff’s Mill Post Office established 1851, was changed to Pyrmont in 1866.

Pyrmont was the site of a 152-foot (46 m) single span Smith truss covered bridge, built in 1860 by the Wheelock Bridge Company. The bridge collapsed in July, 1951.
