= Madison Township, Clinton County, Indiana =

Madison Township
- Township
- Location of Madison Township in Clinton County
- Coordinates: 40°20′31″N 86°39′04″W
- Country: United States
- State: Indiana
- County: Clinton
- Organized: 1839
- Named for: James Madison

Government
  - Type: Indiana township

Area
  - Total: 25.52 sq mi (66.1 km^{2})
  - Land: 25.52 sq mi (66.1 km^{2})
  - Water: 0 sq mi (0 km^{2})
- Elevation: 778 ft (237 m)

Population (2020)
  - Total: 2,118
  - Density: 82.99/sq mi (32.04/km^{2})
- FIPS code: 18-45918
- GNIS feature ID: 453589

Madison Township is one of fourteen townships in Clinton County, Indiana. As of the 2020 census, its population was 2,118 (up from 2,079 at 2010) and it contained 861 housing units. The township was named after President James Madison.

== History ==
The first white settlers in the land that would become Madison Township were Win Winship, Jacob Stettler, Charles Poulston and James Taylor, all of whom arrived in 1829. The first post office was at Winship's Mills with E. Winship as the first postmaster.

== Geography ==
According to the 2010 census, the township has a total area of 25.52 square miles (66.1 km^{2}), all land. Prior to being settled, the land was almost completely covered in dense forest, principally oak, walnut, poplar, sugar maple, beech, ash, hickory, elm, and various other hardwood species.

=== Cities and towns ===
- Mulberry
- Hamilton (unincorporated)

=== Adjacent townships ===
- Ross Township (northeast)
- Washington Township (southeast)
- Lauramie Township, Tippecanoe County (southwest)
- Sheffield Township, Tippecanoe County (west)
- Perry Township, Tippecanoe County (northwest)

=== Major highways ===
- Indiana State Road 38

=== Cemeteries ===
The township contains two cemeteries, Bennet and Fair Haven.
