= Forest, Indiana =

Forest
- Unincorporated community and Census-designated place
- Location within Clinton County, Indiana
- Coordinates: 40°22′30″N 86°19′57″W
- Country: United States
- State: Indiana
- County: Clinton
- Township: Forest
- Founded: 1 September 1874
- Elevation: 883 ft (269 m)
- ZIP code: 46039
- FIPS code: 18-23926
- GNIS feature ID: 2830342

Forest is an unincorporated community in Forest Township, Clinton County, Indiana.

== History ==
The town of Forest was platted on September 1, 1874, by Henry Y. Morrison to serve as a station along the Frankfort and Kokomo Railroad (later the Clover Leaf Railroad). The town's name was given because the site was forested, and the first railroad tickets sold there were issued from an oak stump used as a ticket counter. The town gained a post office in 1877 with C. G. R. Sims as the first postmaster.

The residents of Forest supported the Temperance movement, as a county history describes:

A reckless man undertook to establish a saloon here in the spring of 1886, despite the protests of the citizens, but after his building had been blown up with dynamite he decided to seek another location.

As of circa 1913, the town had "about four hundred" inhabitants and considerable activity, including a bank (Citizens), three churches (Baptist, Methodist and Christian Holiness), and a number of lodges and fraternal organizations, including the Odd Fellows (172 men) and Rebekahs (58 women), Knights of Pythias (77 members), Masons (70), Improved Order of Red Men (48) and Modern Woodmen of America (26). As of 2016, Forest has much less considerable activity with only the post office and three churches still running.

== Demographics ==
The United States Census Bureau first delineated Forest as a census designated place in the 2022 American Community Survey.
