= Indiana State Road 75 =

State highway in Indiana, United States

State Road 75
- SR 75 highlighted in red

Route information
- Maintained by INDOT
- Length: 59.563 mi (95.857 km)

Southern segment
- Length: 36.896 mi (59.378 km)
- South end: US 40 in Stilesville
- Major intersections: US 36 near Danville; US 136 in Jamestown; I-74 in Jamestown; SR 32 near Advance
- North end: SR 47 in Thorntown

Northern segment
- Length: 22.667 mi (36.479 km)
- South end: US 421 / SR 38 / SR 39 near Frankfort
- Major intersections: SR 26 near Sedalia; SR 18 in Flora
- North end: SR 218 in Camden

Location
- Country: United States
- State: Indiana
- Counties: Boone, Hendricks, Putnam, Carroll, Clinton

Highway system
- Indiana State Highway System; Interstate; US; State; Scenic
← I-74	→ I-80

State Road 75, the highest two-digit route in the U.S. state of Indiana, consists of two discontinuous north–south segments.

== Route description ==
=== Southern section ===
The southern section is about 37 miles (60 km) long. It begins at U.S. Route 40 at the Putnam-Hendricks county line and runs northward through the towns of Coatesville and North Salem in Hendricks County, and Jamestown and Advance in Boone County. There is a junction with U.S. Route 136 at Jamestown, and a junction with Interstate 74 just to the north. The northern terminus is at State Road 47 in the town of Thorntown.

=== Northern section ===
The northern section is 22.7 miles (36.5 km) long. It begins at U.S. Route 421 / State Road 38 / State Road 39 in Frankfort in Clinton County and runs northward, crossing State Road 26 east of Rossville, and passing through the town of Flora where it crosses State Road 18. The northern terminus is at State Road 218 in the town of Camden in Carroll County.

In August 2008, the Indiana Department of Transportation awarded Carroll County a grant of $1.2 million to be used to extend the road 3 miles (4.8 km) north, to connect with the planned relocation of State Road 25.

== Former route in Spencer County ==
When the Glover H. Cary Bridge between Owensboro, Kentucky and Rockport, Indiana opened in September 1940, its northern end connected to a new nine-mile (14 km) stretch of state highway through Spencer County that fed traffic to State Road 66. As the Kentucky highway which connected to the bridge was designated Kentucky 75, Indiana gave its connector road the same number.

In 1954, U.S. Route 231 was extended through Indiana, and the southernmost stretch of the new U.S. route in Indiana was routed along S.R. 75. The road was signed with both designations. The Indiana Department of Highways removed 75's designation from U.S. 231 in Spencer County by 1979, along with 231's other concurrent routes throughout the state (others included S.R. 45 and S.R. 43).

In October 2002, with the opening of the William H. Natcher Bridge and the relocation of U.S. 231, this segment of highway was again redesignated, this time as a southern extension of S.R. 161.

== Major intersections ==
County	Location	mi	km	Destinations	Notes
Putnam	Jefferson Township	0.000	0.000	US 40 – Brazil, Indianapolis	Southern terminus of SR 75
Putnam	Jefferson Township	0.177	0.285	SR 240 – Greencastle	
Hendricks	Marion Township	9.478	15.253	US 36 – Rockville, Danville	
Hendricks	North Salem	17.057	27.451	SR 236 – Danville	
Hendricks–Boone county line	Jamestown	21.787	35.063	SR 234 west – Ladoga	Western end of SR 234 concurrency
Boone	Jamestown	22.233	35.781	US 136 / SR 234 – Brownsburg, Crawfordsville	Eastern end of SR 234 concurrency and terminus of SR 234
Boone	Jamestown	23.558– 23.687	37.913– 38.121	I-74 – Indianapolis, Danville	Exit number 52 on I-74
Boone	Jefferson Township	31.365	50.477	SR 32 – Crawfordsville, Lebanon	
Boone	Thorntown	36.896	59.378	SR 47 – Crawfordsville	Northern terminus of the southern section of SR 75
Gap in route
Clinton	Frankfort	36.897	59.380	US 421 / SR 38 / SR 39 – Delphi, Indianapolis	Southern terminus of the northern section of SR 75
Clinton	Owen Township	46.149	74.270	SR 26 – Lafayette, Kokomo	
Carroll	Flora	55.183	88.808	SR 18 – Delphi, Marion	
Carroll	Camden	59.563	95.857	SR 218	Northern terminus of SR 75
1.000 mi = 1.609 km; 1.000 km = 0.621 mi: Concurrency terminus
