= Middlefork, Clinton County, Indiana =

Middlefork
- Unincorporated community
- Location within Clinton County, Indiana
- Coordinates: 40°24′56″N 86°23′33″W
- Country: United States
- State: Indiana
- County: Clinton
- Township: Warren
- Elevation: 817 ft (249 m)
- ZIP code: 46041
- FIPS code: 18-48960
- GNIS feature ID: 449695

Middlefork is an unincorporated community in Warren Township, Clinton County, Indiana. It is named for the Middle Fork of Wildcat Creek which runs along the north side of the town.

== History ==
Middlefork was founded along the Michigan Road, an important early Indiana thoroughfare, but the site never gained a railroad line and remained a small social and business center for local residents. The town's first store was operated by William Sims, then by John Evans. Its first postmaster was John Purdum.

Several lodges and fraternal organization operated at Middlefork, including the Masons, Red Men, Odd Fellows, GAR and the Independent Order of Good Templars, the latter being dedicated to temperance work. The Templars "bought out the only saloon keeper in the place and emptied his stock of liquors into the street, after which there was no further sale of intoxicants in the village."

A post office was established at Middlefork (spelled Middle Fork in early years) in 1836, and remained in operation until it was discontinued in 1907.
