= Sedalia, Indiana =

Sedalia
- Unincorporated community
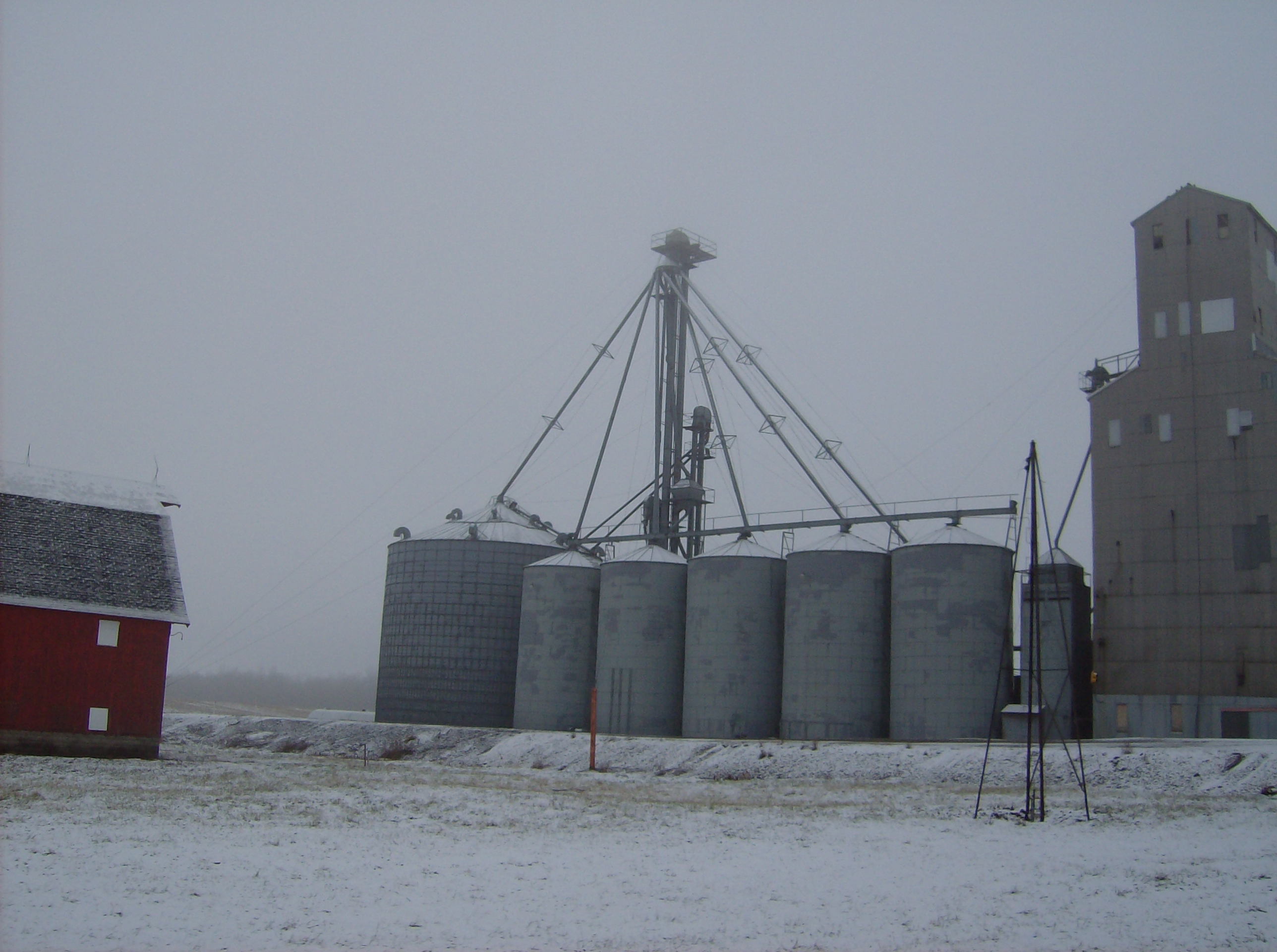
- Grain elevator in Sedalia

- Location within Clinton County, Indiana
- Coordinates: 40°24′56″N 86°30′53″W
- Country: United States
- State: Indiana
- County: Clinton
- Township: Owen
- Elevation: 781 ft (238 m)
- ZIP code: 46067
- FIPS code: 18-68598
- GNIS feature ID: 443192

Sedalia is an unincorporated community in Owen Township, Clinton County, Indiana, United States.

== History ==
Sedalia was platted March 31, 1873 by James A. Campbell and Jackson B. McCune and was named after Sedalia, Illinois, the home town of an official of the Vandalia Railroad. McCune built the first house and was the first postmaster. William Miller operated the first store, Allen Branch was the first blacksmith, and Dr. Keeny the first physician.

== Geography ==
Sedalia is located along State Road 26, half a mile east of State Road 75.

== Gallery ==
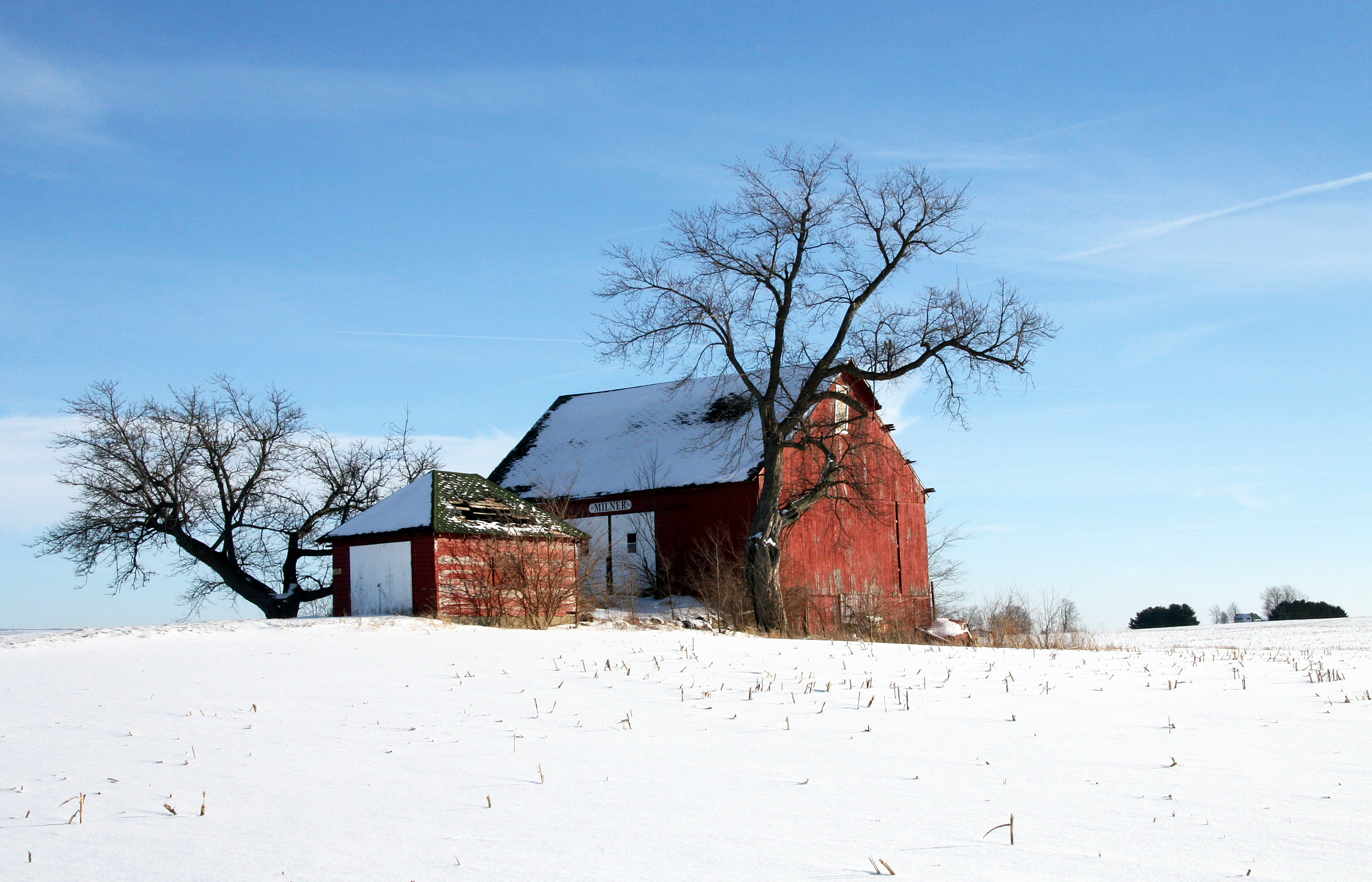
The Milner barn on the east side of town, since demolished.
