= Geetingsville, Indiana =

Geetingsville
- Unincorporated community
- Location within Clinton County, Indiana
- Coordinates: 40°24′59″N 86°28′07″W
- Country: United States
- State: Indiana
- County: Clinton
- Township: Owen
- Elevation: 827 ft (252 m)
- ZIP code: 46041
- FIPS code: 18-27180
- GNIS feature ID: 435475

Geetingsville is an unincorporated community on the border of Owen and Warren townships in Clinton County, Indiana.

== History ==
Never officially platted, the village of Geetingsville was a small social and business center with a general store, a blacksmith shop and a physician (Dr. M. V. Young). In the 1880s the Presbyterians erected a brick church in Geetingsville.

Geetingsville had a post office between 1856 and 1905. Henry W. Geeting served as postmaster.
