= Jackson Township, Clinton County, Indiana =

Jackson Township
- Township
- Location of Jackson Township in Clinton County
- Coordinates: 40°13′12″N 86°30′12″W
- Country: United States
- State: Indiana
- County: Clinton
- Organized: 1830
- Named after: Andrew Jackson

Government
  - Type: Indiana township

Area
  - Total: 43.45 sq mi (112.5 km^{2})
  - Land: 43.45 sq mi (112.5 km^{2})
  - Water: 0 sq mi (0 km^{2})
- Elevation: 883 ft (269 m)

Population (2020)
  - Total: 1,207
  - Density: 27.78/sq mi (10.73/km^{2})
- FIPS code: 18-36882
- GNIS feature ID: 453437

Jackson Township is one of fourteen townships in Clinton County, Indiana. As of the 2020 census, its population was 1,207 (up from 1,173 at 2010 The township was named for President Andrew Jackson.) and it contained 493 housing units.

== History ==
Jackson was one Clinton County's original townships, created at the first meeting of the county commissioners on May 15, 1830, and remains the largest of the current fourteen. Its first white settlers were Walter and Anthony Leek who arrived in 1828.

== Geography ==
According to the 2010 census, the township has a total area of 43.45 square miles (112.5 km^{2}), all land. It includes most of what was known to the pioneers as Twelve Mile Prairie. The unincorporated towns of Cyclone and Manson sit on its eastern and western borders, respectively. A CSX rail line (originally laid down by the Terre Haute, Indianapolis and Eastern Railroad) runs south from Frankfort through the middle of the township.

=== Unincorporated towns ===
- Antioch
- Cyclone

(This list is based on USGS data and may include former settlements.)

=== Adjacent townships ===
- Center Township (north)
- Michigan Township (northeast)
- Kirklin Township (east)
- Clinton Township, Boone County (southeast)
- Washington Township, Boone County (south)
- Sugar Creek Township, Boone County (southwest)
- Perry Township (west)
- Washington Township (northwest)

=== Major highways ===
- Interstate 65
- Indiana State Road 38
- Indiana State Road 39

=== Cemeteries ===
The township contains two cemeteries: Allen and Buntin.
