= Rossville, Indiana =

- Town
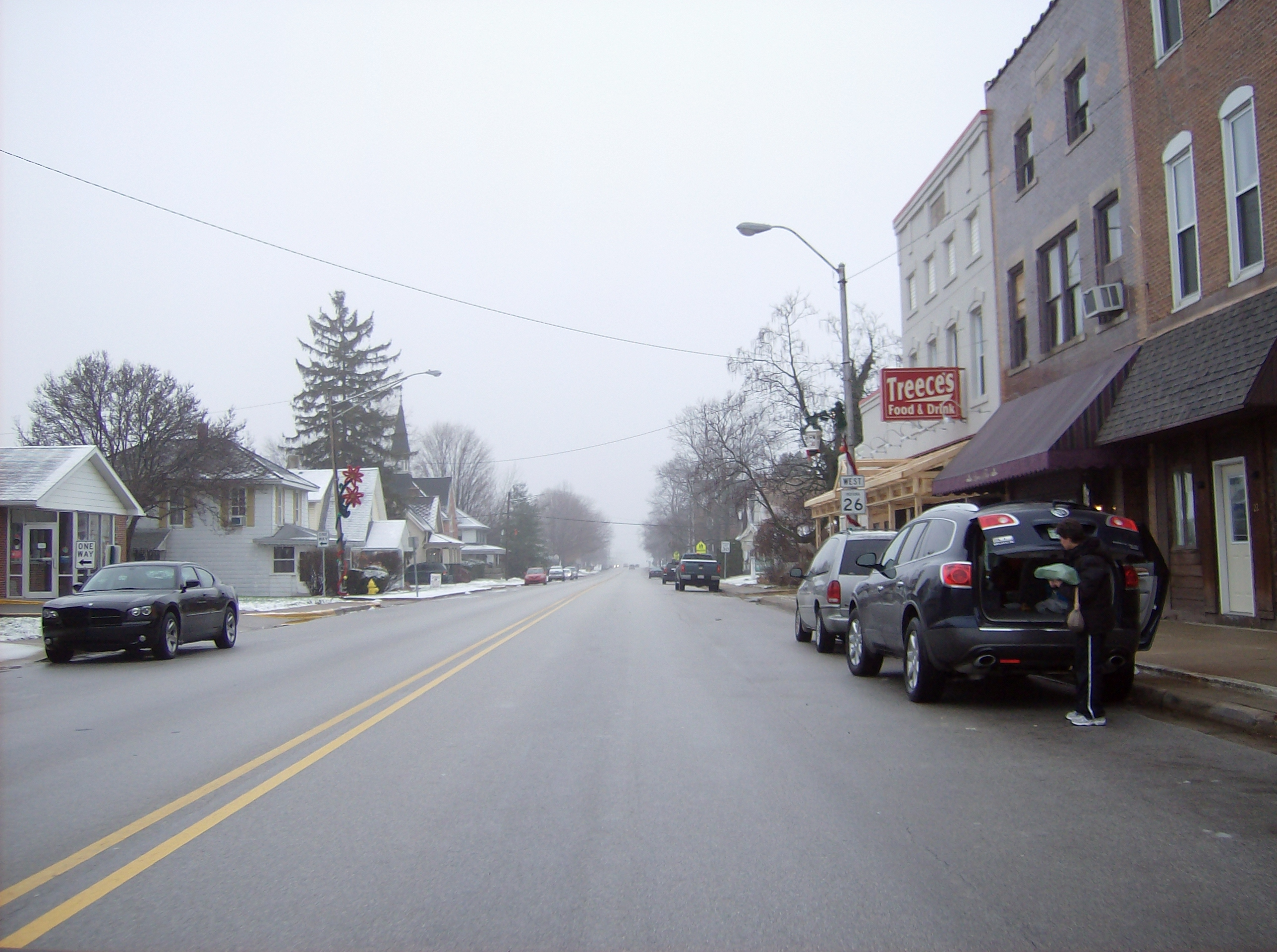
- Westbound along Main Street in downtown Rossville

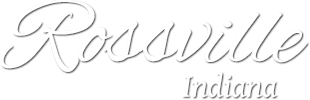
- Logo
- Motto: "Where You Feel At Home"
- Location of Rossville in Clinton County, Indiana.
- Coordinates: 40°25′11″N 86°35′45″W
- Country: United States
- State: Indiana
- County: Clinton
- Township: Ross
- Founded: 1832
- Incorporated: December 1, 1870
- Named for: John Ross

Area
  - Total: 0.46 sq mi (1.19 km^{2})
  - Land: 0.46 sq mi (1.19 km^{2})
  - Water: 0 sq mi (0.00 km^{2})
- Elevation: 722 ft (220 m)

Population (2020)
  - Total: 1,508
  - Density: 3,284.2/sq mi (1,268.04/km^{2})
- Time zone: UTC-5 (Eastern (EST))
  - Summer (DST): UTC-4 (EDT)
- ZIP code: 46065
- Area code: 765
- FIPS code: 18-66150
- GNIS feature ID: 2396891
- Website: rossville.net

Rossville is a town in Ross Township, Clinton County, Indiana, United States. As of the 2020 census, Rossville had a population of 1,508.

== History ==
The area that is now Rossville was originally inhabited by the Miami Indians. The first settlers arrived in 1828.

In 1832, Gaige Wagner, with his wife Johanna Wallace and infant child Salmon, settled on 160 acres (0.65 km^{2}) of land north of what is now Main Street in Rossville. In 1834, Ewing and Thomas Smith platted the town of Rossville with the intention of starting a blacksmith shop at the location. The town grew steadily and gained a store operated by William Seawright, a saddler (John H. Smith) and a physician (Dr. James Wilson). Residents of Rossville are also referred to as "Rossvillians".

A petition to incorporate the town was filed on October 22, 1870, at which time the town had 339 residents and 66 families. The incorporation election, held November 5, passed with a vote of 35 to 19 and on December 1, 1870, Rossville was incorporated. The town is named for John Ross, a pioneer settler and associate county judge.

The Monon Railroad was completed through Rossville in 1883.

== Geography ==
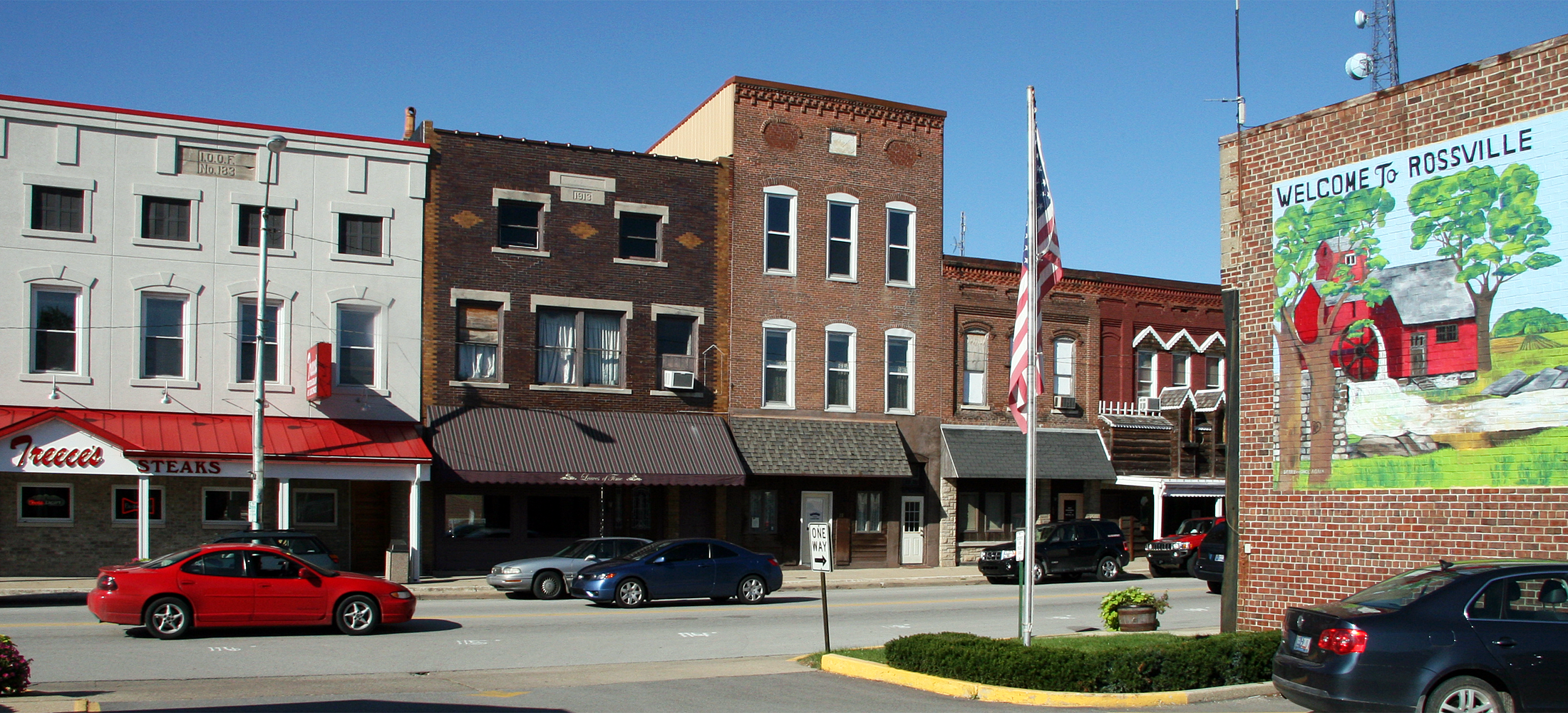
Downtown Rossville

According to the 2010 census, Rossville has a total area of 0.52 square miles (1.35 km^{2}), all land.

== Demographics ==
Historical population
Census	Pop.	Note	%±
1850	160		—
1860	329		105.6%
1870	389		18.2%
1880	475		22.1%
1890	594		25.1%
1900	598		0.7%
1910	677		13.2%
1920	595		−12.1%
1930	626		5.2%
1940	627		0.2%
1950	739		17.9%
1960	831		12.4%
1970	830		−0.1%
1980	1,148		38.3%
1990	1,175		2.4%
2000	1,513		28.8%
2010	1,653		9.3%
2020	1,508		−8.8%
U.S. Decennial Census

=== 2020 census ===
As of the 2020 census, Rossville had a population of 1,508. The median age was 37.0 years. 26.4% of residents were under the age of 18 and 17.2% of residents were 65 years of age or older. For every 100 females there were 92.1 males, and for every 100 females age 18 and over there were 86.2 males age 18 and over.

0.0% of residents lived in urban areas, while 100.0% lived in rural areas.

There were 600 households in Rossville, of which 33.5% had children under the age of 18 living in them. Of all households, 50.7% were married-couple households, 13.3% were households with a male householder and no spouse or partner present, and 27.7% were households with a female householder and no spouse or partner present. About 24.5% of all households were made up of individuals and 10.3% had someone living alone who was 65 years of age or older.

There were 642 housing units, of which 6.5% were vacant. The homeowner vacancy rate was 0.7% and the rental vacancy rate was 7.5%.

Racial composition as of the 2020 census
Race	Number	Percent
White	1,385	91.8%
Black or African American	10	0.7%
American Indian and Alaska Native	1	0.1%
Asian	5	0.3%
Native Hawaiian and Other Pacific Islander	1	0.1%
Some other race	35	2.3%
Two or more races	71	4.7%
Hispanic or Latino (of any race)	54	3.6%

=== 2010 census ===
As of the census of 2010, there were 1,653 people, 611 households, and 451 families living in the town. The population density was 3,118.9 inhabitants per square mile (1,204.2/km^{2}). There were 652 housing units at an average density of 1,230.2 per square mile (475.0/km^{2}). The racial makeup of the town was 97.5% White, 0.4% African American, 0.2% Native American, 0.5% Asian, 0.6% from other races, and 0.8% from two or more races. Hispanic or Latino of any race were 0.8% of the population.

There were 611 households, of which 37.3% had children under the age of 18 living with them, 54.5% were married couples living together, 14.6% had a female householder with no husband present, 4.7% had a male householder with no wife present, and 26.2% were non-families. 22.6% of all households were made up of individuals, and 11.4% had someone living alone who was 65 years of age or older. The average household size was 2.56 and the average family size was 2.99.

The median age in the town was 39.6 years. 26% of residents were under the age of 18; 7.7% were between the ages of 18 and 24; 23.4% were from 25 to 44; 23.8% were from 45 to 64; and 18.9% were 65 years of age or older. The gender makeup of the town was 45.5% male and 54.5% female.

=== 2000 census ===
As of the census of 2000, there were 1,513 people, 555 households, and 411 families living in the town. The population density was 2,929.8 inhabitants per square mile (1,131.2/km^{2}). There were 586 housing units at an average density of 1,134.7 per square mile (438.1/km^{2}). The racial makeup of the town was 98.88% White, 0.53% African American, 0.13% Asian, 0.07% from other races, and 0.40% from two or more races. Hispanic or Latino of any race were 0.33% of the population.

There were 555 households, out of which 38.7% had children under the age of 18 living with them, 64.3% were married couples living together, 7.2% had a female householder with no husband present, and 25.8% were non-families. 22.5% of all households were made up of individuals, and 9.9% had someone living alone who was 65 years of age or older. The average household size was 2.58 and the average family size was 3.04.

In the town, the population was spread out, with 27.8% under the age of 18, 5.9% from 18 to 24, 31.9% from 25 to 44, 16.7% from 45 to 64, and 17.7% who were 65 years of age or older. The median age was 36 years. For every 100 females, there were 80.3 males. For every 100 females age 18 and over, there were 81.7 males.

The median income for a household in the town was $48,333, and the median income for a family was $50,694. Males had a median income of $45,000 versus $23,819 for females. The per capita income for the town was $19,765. About 2.3% of families and 3.7% of the population were below the poverty line, including 2.8% of those under age 18 and 8.7% of those age 65 or over.

== Arts and culture ==
=== Annual cultural events ===
An annual festival marks the end of summer in Rossville. The event has been held annually since 1984. The festival is held on the fourth full weekend in August, and includes a car show, fireworks, music, performances on the main stage, street fair, parade, programs in the high school auditorium, queen, little miss and mister contest, and town-wide garage sales. The festival concludes with a community-wide worship service.
