= National Register of Historic Places listings in Carroll County, Indiana =

Location of Carroll County in Indiana

This is a list of the National Register of Historic Places listings in Carroll County, Indiana.

This is intended to be a complete list of the properties and districts on the National Register of Historic Places in Carroll County, Indiana, United States. Latitude and longitude coordinates are provided for many National Register properties and districts; these locations may be seen together in a map.

There are 41 properties and districts listed on the National Register in the county. Another property was once listed but has been removed.

Properties and districts located in incorporated areas display the name of the municipality, while properties and districts in unincorporated areas display the name of their civil township. Properties and districts split between multiple jurisdictions display the names of all jurisdictions.

This National Park Service list is complete through NPS recent listings posted August 28, 2026.

== Current listings ==
	Name on the Register	Image	Date listed	Location	City or town	Description
1	Adams Mill	Adams Mill	November 23, 1984 (#84000278)	Off County Road 50E, northeast of Cutler; 40°28′50″N 86°30′29″W	Democrat Township	
2	Adams Mill Covered Bridge	Adams Mill Covered Bridge	January 11, 1996 (#95001537)	County Road 50E over Wildcat Creek, northeast of Cutler; 40°29′01″N 86°30′42″W	Democrat Township	
3	American House Hotel		September 4, 2018 (#100002859)	205 Michigan Rd. 40°28′52″N 86°23′42″W	Burlington	
4	Bachelor Run Steel Truss Bridge		August 31, 2026 (#100013345)	County Road East 250 South; 40°30′38″N 86°26′39″W	Burlington Township	
5	Barnett-Seawright-Wilson House	Barnett-Seawright-Wilson House	September 17, 1980 (#80000054)	203 E. Monroe St. 40°35′18″N 86°40′25″W	Delphi	
6	Baum-Shaeffer Farm	Baum-Shaeffer Farm	August 28, 1998 (#98001102)	6678 W200N, southeast of Delphi; 40°34′28″N 86°39′11″W	Deer Creek Township	
7	Burlington Township No. 9 School		November 29, 2019 (#100004727)	6013 Cty. Rd. East 600 South. 40°27′37″N 86°24′40″W	Burlington Township	
8	Burris House and Potawatomi Spring	Burris House and Potawatomi Spring	September 15, 1977 (#77000018)	Towpath Rd. at Lockport; 40°41′54″N 86°34′28″W	Adams Township	
9	Camden First Baptist Church		February 22, 2023 (#100008659)	225 East Main St. 40°36′31″N 86°32′16″W	Camden	
10	Camden Masonic Temple	Camden Masonic Temple	December 23, 2003 (#03001313)	213 W. Main St. 40°36′31″N 86°32′26″W	Camden	
11	Camden Paint Creek Concrete Arch Bridge		March 3, 2025 (#100011479)	State Road 218 over Paint Creek; 40°36′30″N 86°31′39″W	Camden vicinity	
12	Carroll County Courthouse	Carroll County Courthouse	December 23, 2003 (#03001317)	101 W. Main St. 40°35′10″N 86°40′29″W	Delphi	
13	Carroll County Infirmary		December 3, 2018 (#100003177)	6409 W100N; 40°33′42″N 86°38′48″W	Deer Creek Township	
14	Carrollton Bridge	Carrollton Bridge	June 22, 2003 (#03000539)	Carrollton Rd. across the Wabash River, north of Delphi; 40°38′54″N 86°39′24″W	Adams, Deer Creek, and Tippecanoe Townships	
15	Deer Creek Valley Rural Historic District	Deer Creek Valley Rural Historic District	December 19, 2002 (#02001557)	Southeastern corner of Sec. 21, most of Sec. 22, and areas north of Deer Creek, east of Delphi; 40°35′35″N 86°37′49″W	Deer Creek Township	
16	Delphi City Hall	Delphi City Hall	December 17, 1998 (#98001525)	105-109 Washington St. 40°35′12″N 86°40′26″W	Delphi	
17	Delphi Courthouse Square Historic District	Delphi Courthouse Square Historic District	March 31, 2010 (#10000120)	Roughly bounded by Monroe, the southern side of Main, and the western sides of Market and Indiana Sts. 40°35′11″N 86°40′29″W	Delphi	
18	Delphi Lime Kilns	Delphi Lime Kilns	June 27, 2002 (#02000693)	North-northwest of Delphi; 40°35′45″N 86°40′43″W	Deer Creek Township	
19	Delphi Methodist Episcopal Church	Delphi Methodist Episcopal Church	September 14, 2015 (#15000592)	118 N. Union St. 40°35′17″N 86°40′26″W	Delphi	
20	Delphi Residential Historic District		November 19, 2024 (#100011037)	Roughly bounded by the Norfolk & Southern Railroad on the north and west, Front Street on the south, and Bowen Street (or a continuation thereof) on the east. 40°35′20″N 86°40′19″W	Delphi	
21	District School No. 3	District School No. 3	March 31, 1988 (#88000374)	Southeastern corner of the junction of County Roads 750N and 100W, northeast of Rockfield; 40°39′21″N 86°32′38″W	Rock Creek Township	
22	Foreman-Case House	Foreman-Case House	May 24, 1990 (#90000811)	312 E. Main St. 40°35′12″N 86°40′15″W	Delphi	
23	Franklin Street Stone Arch Bridge	Franklin Street Stone Arch Bridge	March 1, 2021 (#100006203)	Franklin St. over Old Canal; 40°35′01″N 86°41′01″W	Delphi	
24	Lancaster Covered Bridge	Lancaster Covered Bridge	March 2, 2021 (#100006206)	Cty. Rd. 500 W-500 S over Wildcat Cr. 40°28′04″N 86°37′02″W	Owasco vicinity	
25	Little Rock Creek Stone Arch Bridge		March 2, 2021 (#100006207)	Cty. Rd. 1025 N-175 W over Little Rock Cr. 40°41′42″N 86°33′24″W	Lockport vicinity	
26	Lock No. 33 Lock Keeper's House, and Wabash and Erie Canal Lock No. 33	Lock No. 33 Lock Keeper's House, and Wabash and Erie Canal Lock No. 33	June 24, 2002 (#02000684)	Along the Wabash and Erie Canal south of Bicycle Bridge Rd., southwest of Delphi; 40°34′52″N 86°41′00″W	Deer Creek Township	
27	Lockport Wabash River Bridge		March 3, 2025 (#100011480)	North County Road 300 North over Wabash River; 40°41′38″N 86°34′15″W	Lockport vicinity	
28	Meridian Line Road Iron Truss Bridge		September 9, 2025 (#100011870)	Meridian Line Road over Deer Creek; 40°36′04″N 86°31′31″W	Camden	
29	Middle Fork Wildcat Creek Concrete Arch Bridge		August 31, 2026 (#100013343)	State Road 75 over Middle Fork of Wildcat Creek; 40°26′27″N 86°31′30″W	Democrat Township	
30	Niewerth Building	Niewerth Building	May 24, 1984 (#84001001)	124 E. Main St. 40°35′10″N 86°40′22″W	Delphi	
31	North Street Viaduct	North Street Viaduct	August 28, 2023 (#100009295)	North St. overpass at US 421/39/Washington St. 40°34′56″N 86°40′13″W	Delphi	
32	Fred and Minnie Raber Farm	Fred and Minnie Raber Farm	September 16, 1992 (#92001169)	State Road 218 east of County Road 425W, west of Camden; 40°36′21″N 86°36′11″W	Deer Creek Township	
33	South Delphi Historic District		March 5, 2024 (#100010027)	Roughly bounded by the north boundary of Riley Park on the north, Prince William Road on the northeast, the alley south of Summit Street on the southeast, and Wabash Street and the west boundary of Riley Park on the south and southwest 40°34′54″N 86°40′11″W	Delphi	
34	Sunset Point	Sunset Point	June 24, 2002 (#02000685)	Confluence of Deer Creek and the Wabash River, southwest of Delphi; 40°34′20″N 86°41′18″W	Deer Creek Township	
35	Sycamore Row	Sycamore Row	June 24, 2002 (#100009297)	Old IN 29 from Deer Creek south approx. 1,300 feet (400 m) to IN 29; 40°36′25″N 86°23′29″W	Washington Township	
36	Andrew Thomas House	Andrew Thomas House	December 27, 1984 (#84000485)	W. Main St. 40°36′31″N 86°32′26″W	Camden	
37	Wabash and Erie Canal Culvert No. 100	Wabash and Erie Canal Culvert No. 100	March 20, 2002 (#02000194)	Towpath Rd. over Burnett's Creek, northeast of Lockport; 40°42′11″N 86°34′02″W	Adams Township	
38	Wagoner-Ayres House		May 20, 2024 (#100010377)	4565 East State Road 18; 40°32′48″N 86°26′18″W	Flora	
39	Washington Street Stone Arch Bridge	Washington Street Stone Arch Bridge	March 1, 2021 (#100006209)	Washington St. over Old Canal; 40°35′34″N 86°40′44″W	Delphi	
40	Wildcat Creek Steel Truss Bridge		August 31, 2026 (#100013344)	Highway 75 over Wildcat Creek; 40°28′55″N 86°31′48″W	Democrat Township	
41	Wilson Bridge	Wilson Bridge	June 6, 2001 (#01000623)	0.6 miles (0.97 km) west of County Road 450W on County Road 300N over Deer Creek, east of Delphi; 40°35′27″N 86°37′16″W	Deer Creek Township	

== Former listing ==
	Name on the Register	Image	Date listed	Date removed	Location	City or town	Description
1	Pulaski County Bridge No. 31	Pulaski County Bridge No. 31	June 22, 2003 (#03000546)	October 1, 2014	Spans the Wabash and Erie Canal, southwest of downtown Delphi; 40°34′59″N 86°41′00″W	Delphi	Formerly located on County Road 1175W near Medaryville; moved to Delphi in 2006

== See also ==
- List of National Historic Landmarks in Indiana
- National Register of Historic Places listings in Indiana
- Listings in neighboring counties: Cass, Clinton, Howard, Tippecanoe, White
- List of Indiana state historical markers in Carroll County
