= McIntyre House =

McIntyre House, McIntyre Farm or McIntyre Building or variations, may refer to:

- McIntyre House (Salt Lake City, Utah), listed on the National Register of Historic Places (NRHP) in Salt Lake City, Utah
- McIntyre House (Logan, Arkansas), listed on the NRHP in Benton County, Arkansas
- J. McIntyre Farm, Newark, Delaware, NRHP-listed
- Bradlee-McIntyre House, Longwood, Florida, NRHP-listed
- McIntyre-Burri House, Saint Joseph, Missouri, listed on the NRHP in Buchanan County, Missouri
- McIntyre Building, Salt Lake City, Utah, listed on the NRHP in Salt Lake City, Utah
