= Adams Mills =

Adams Mills may refer to:

- Adams Mills, Ohio, small unincorporated community in Muskingum County, Ohio, United States
- Adams Mills, Michigan, populated place in Branch County, Michigan

== See also ==
- Adams Mill
