= Burris House =

Burris House may refer to:

- Burris House and Potawatomi Spring, Carroll County, Indiana, listed on the National Register of Historic Places (NRHP)
- Charles McLaran House, also known as Burris House, Columbus, Mississippi, NRHP-listed
- Bost-Burris House, also known as the Elias Burris House, near Newton, Catawba County, North Carolina, NRHP-listed

== See also ==
- McIntyre-Burri House in St. Joseph, Missouri, NRHP-listed
