= Adams Mill Covered Bridge =

- U.S. National Register of Historic Places
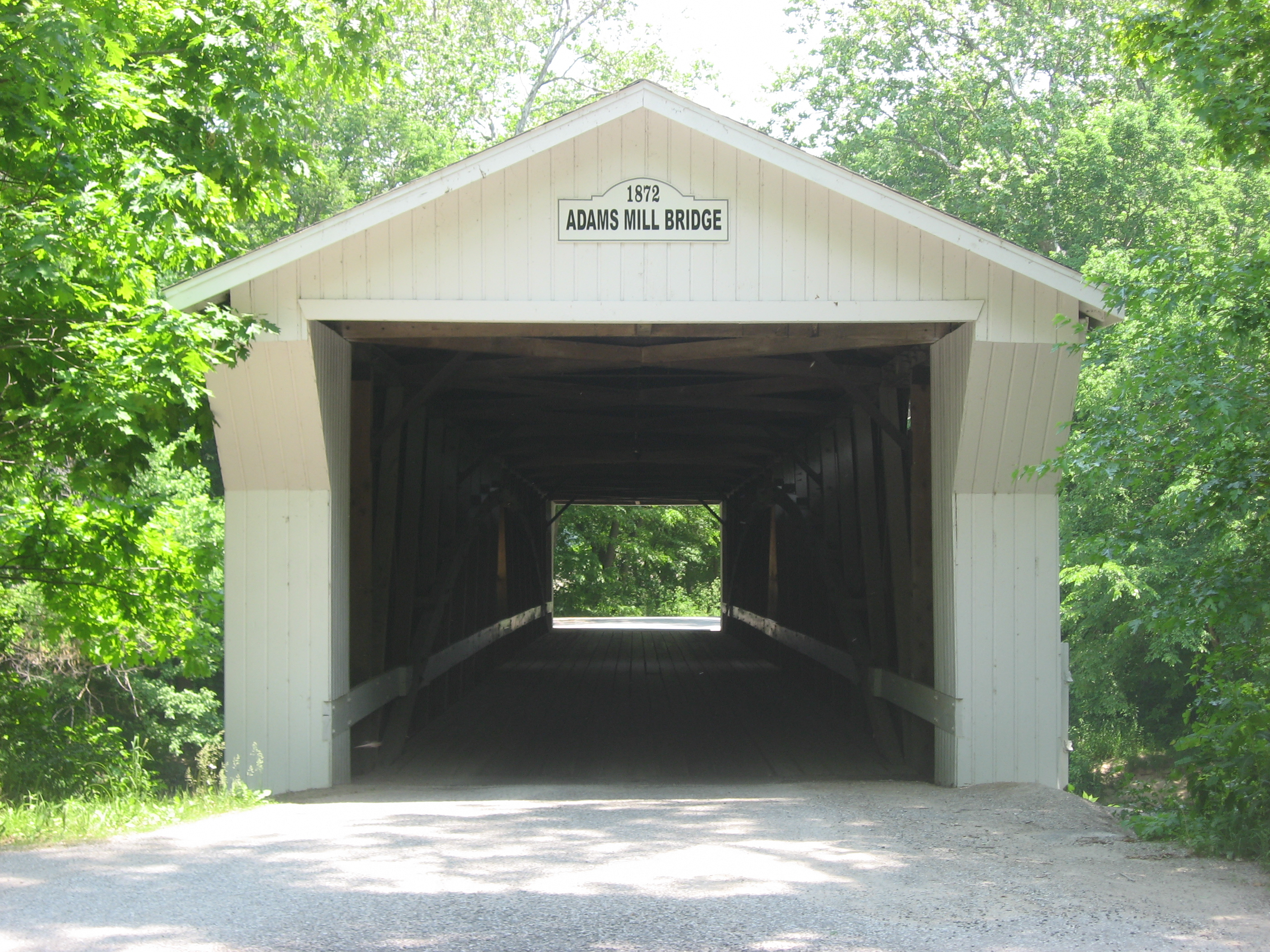

- Location within Carroll County, Indiana Location within Indiana Location within the United States
- Nearest city: Cutler, Indiana
- Coordinates: 40°29′1″N 86°30′42″W
- Built: 1872
- Architect: Robert W. Smith; Wheelock Bridge Company
- Architectural style: Howe truss, Burr arch
- NRHP reference No.: 95001537
- Added to NRHP: January 11, 1996

Adams Mill Covered Bridge is a covered bridge located near Cutler, Indiana. It was built in 1872, added to the National Register of Historic Places in 1996, and completely restored in 1999.

== History ==
John Adams was an early settler, moving to Carroll County, Indiana, in 1831. There he settled, finishing construction of his Adams Mill in 1845. In June 1871, the Carroll County Commissioners approved petitions requesting that two bridges be built over Wildcat Creek. Adams Mill Bridge was built in 1872 by the Wheelock Bridge Company. Both bridges were completed for a total cost of $12,237.33.

In 1870 Richard Loman and others petitioned for a covered bridge to be built across the Wild Cat Creek, and the proposal was approved in 1871. The bridge used a Howe truss system.

In 1875, the first bridge built was washed out in a flood.

About 1900, the bridge was modified with the addition of Burr arches to increase the load the bridge could carry. By 1957 the bridge's condition had worsened to the point that a local history group began a fundraising campaign for it. The bridge was closed to vehicles in 1974 because of its condition. In 1978, the bridge suffered from severe vandalism. In 1992 Friends of Adams Mill Valley, Inc., was formed to again raise money for the bridge's care. The group received a grant for $291,000. In addition, the group raised $85,000 by 1999 and given to the county to receive a 20-percent matching grant. In the mid-1990s, bikes and foot traffic were also banned. Finally, in 1999 the Kaser-Spraker Construction Co. started restoring the bridge. On October 9, 1999, it was reopened. The project cost $686,000.

In 1996, Adams Mill Covered Bridge was added to the National Register of Historic Places.

In 1998 the Friends of Adams Mill Valley, Inc., made a deal with Kaser-Spraker Inc. of South Bend, Indiana, in the amount of $545,932.00 for restoration. On October 9, 1999, restoration was complete and the bridge was reopened.

== Description ==
The Adams Mill Covered Bridge uses a No. 1 Howe truss with wheelock iron abutments and latter arches attached to the truss.

It is located south of State Road 18 and north of State Road 26, 0.5 miles (0.80 km) east of Cutler to County Road 50 East, 0.5 miles (0.80 km) north on County Road 50 East.

== Gallery ==
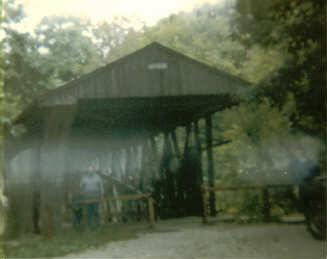
The Adams Mill Bridge prior to renovation.

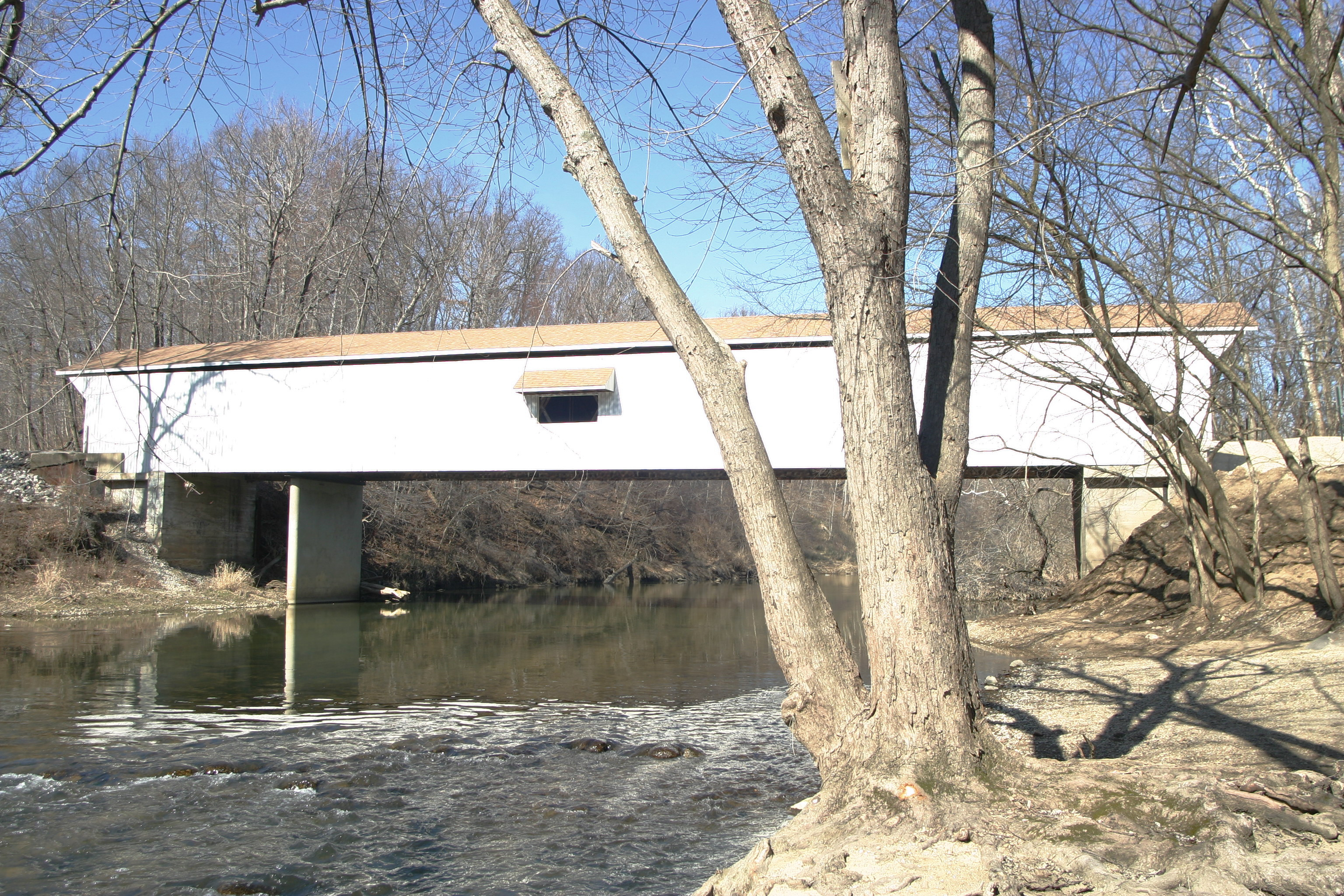
Side of the bridge (2006)

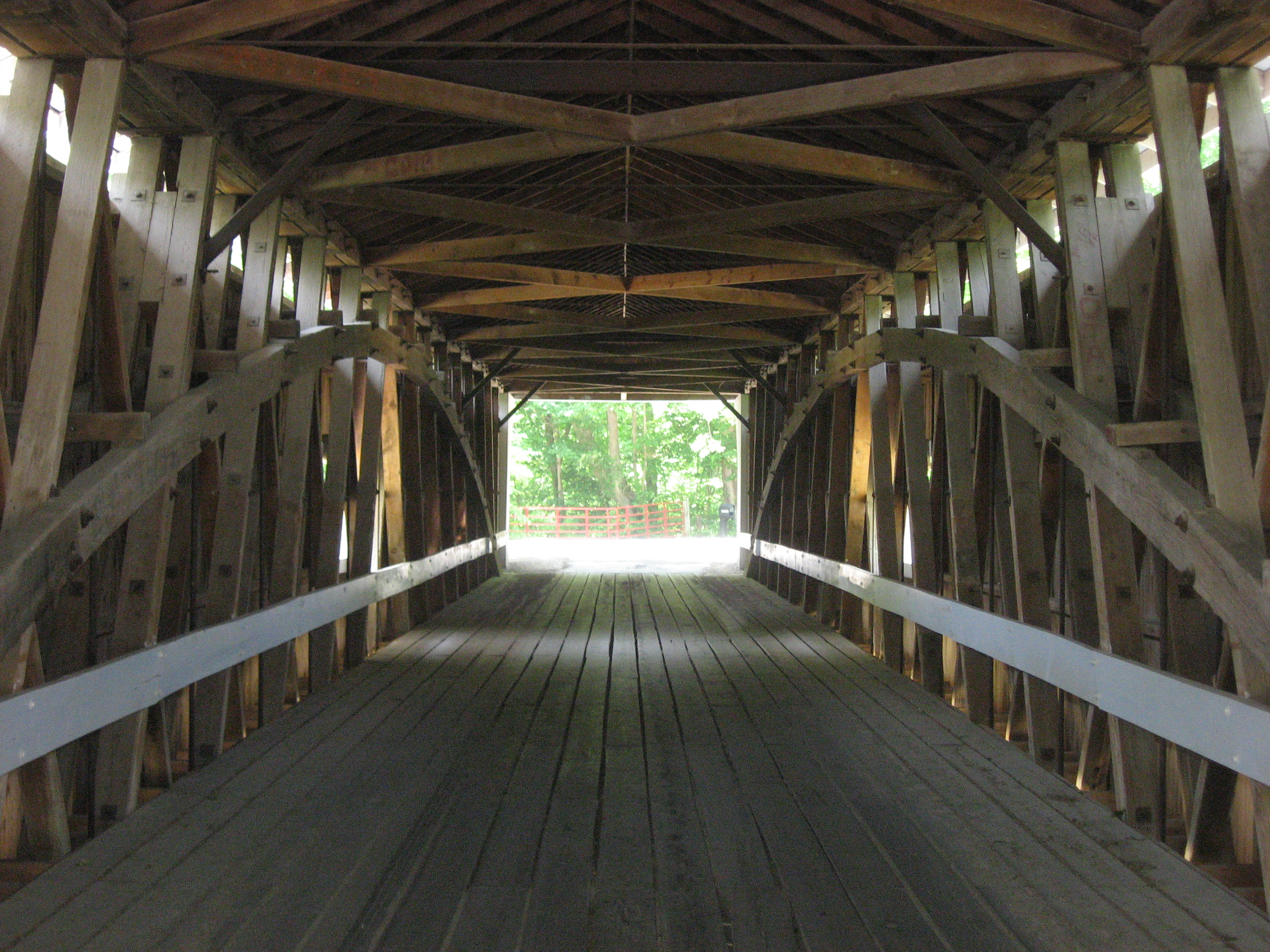
Inside view looking northwards

== See also ==
- List of bridges documented by the Historic American Engineering Record in Indiana
- National Register of Historic Places listings in Carroll County, Indiana
- List of covered bridges in Indiana
