= List of Indiana state historical markers in Carroll County =

Location of Carroll County in Indiana

This is a list of the Indiana state historical markers in Carroll County.

This is intended to be a complete list of the official state historical markers placed in Carroll County, Indiana, United States by the Indiana Historical Bureau. The locations of the historical markers and their latitude and longitude coordinates are included below when available, along with their names, years of placement, and topics as recorded by the Historical Bureau. There are 5 historical markers located in Carroll County.

== Historical markers ==
Marker title	Image	Year placed	Location	Topics
Sycamore Row		1963	State Road 29, 0.5 miles south of Deer Creek; 40°36′19″N 86°23′28.5″W	Transportation, Nature and Natural Disasters
New Purchase Boundary (Treaty of St. Mary's)		1966	U.S. Route 421 south of the Wabash River bridge and north of South Road near Pittsburg; 40°35′28″N 86°42′0″W	Early Settlement and Exploration, American Indian/Native American, Government Institutions
Wabash and Erie Canal		1992	Bicycle Bridge Road, 0.1 miles north of the junction of U.S. Route 421 and Indiana State Road 25 at the trailhead access and parking for Historic Delphi Trails on the western edge of Delphi; 40°35′0″N 86°41′1″W	Transportation, Business, Industry, and Labor
Claude R. Wickard		2018	Carroll White REMC, 241 N. Heartland Dr., Delphi; 40°30′26″N 86°39′7″W	Agriculture, Industry and Labor, Government
Fouts Soyland Farm / American Soybean Association		2020	Route 29 south of County Road E400N, Deer Creek; 40°36′8″N 86°23′29″W	Agriculture, Industry and Labor
Sycamore Row (replaced 1963 marker)		2021	State Road 29, 0.5 mile south of Deer Creek; 40°36′21″N 86°23′27″W	Transportation, Nature and Natural Disasters

== See also ==
- List of Indiana state historical markers
- National Register of Historic Places listings in Carroll County, Indiana
