= Michigan Road Toll House =

- U.S. National Register of Historic Places
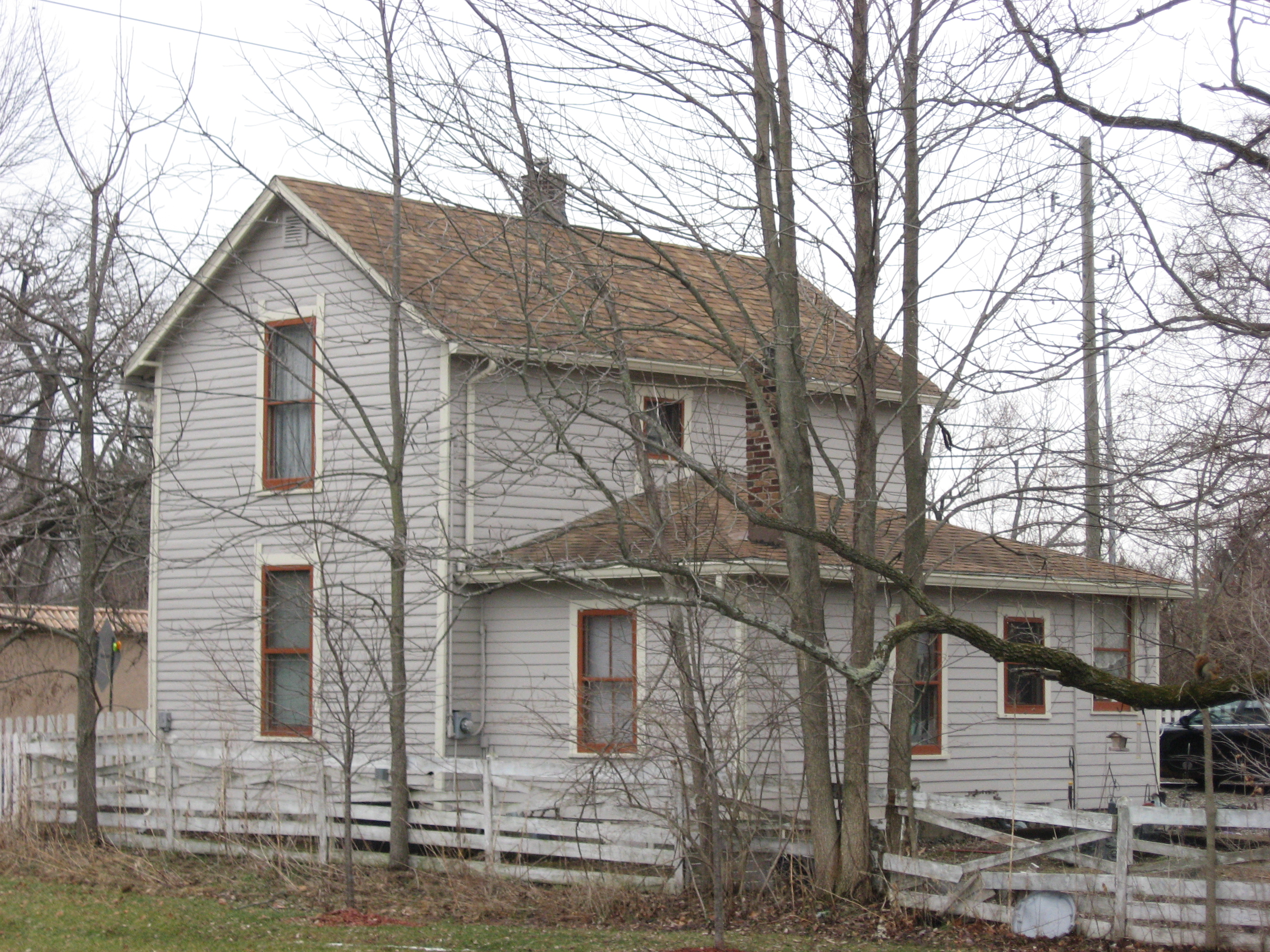
- Michigan Road Toll House, November 2010

- Location within Indianapolis Location within Indiana Location within the United States
- Location: 4702 Michigan Rd., NW., Indianapolis, Indiana
- Coordinates: 39°50′29″N 86°11′20″W
- Area: less than one acre
- Built: c. 1850, 1886
- NRHP reference No.: 74000031
- Added to NRHP: August 7, 1974

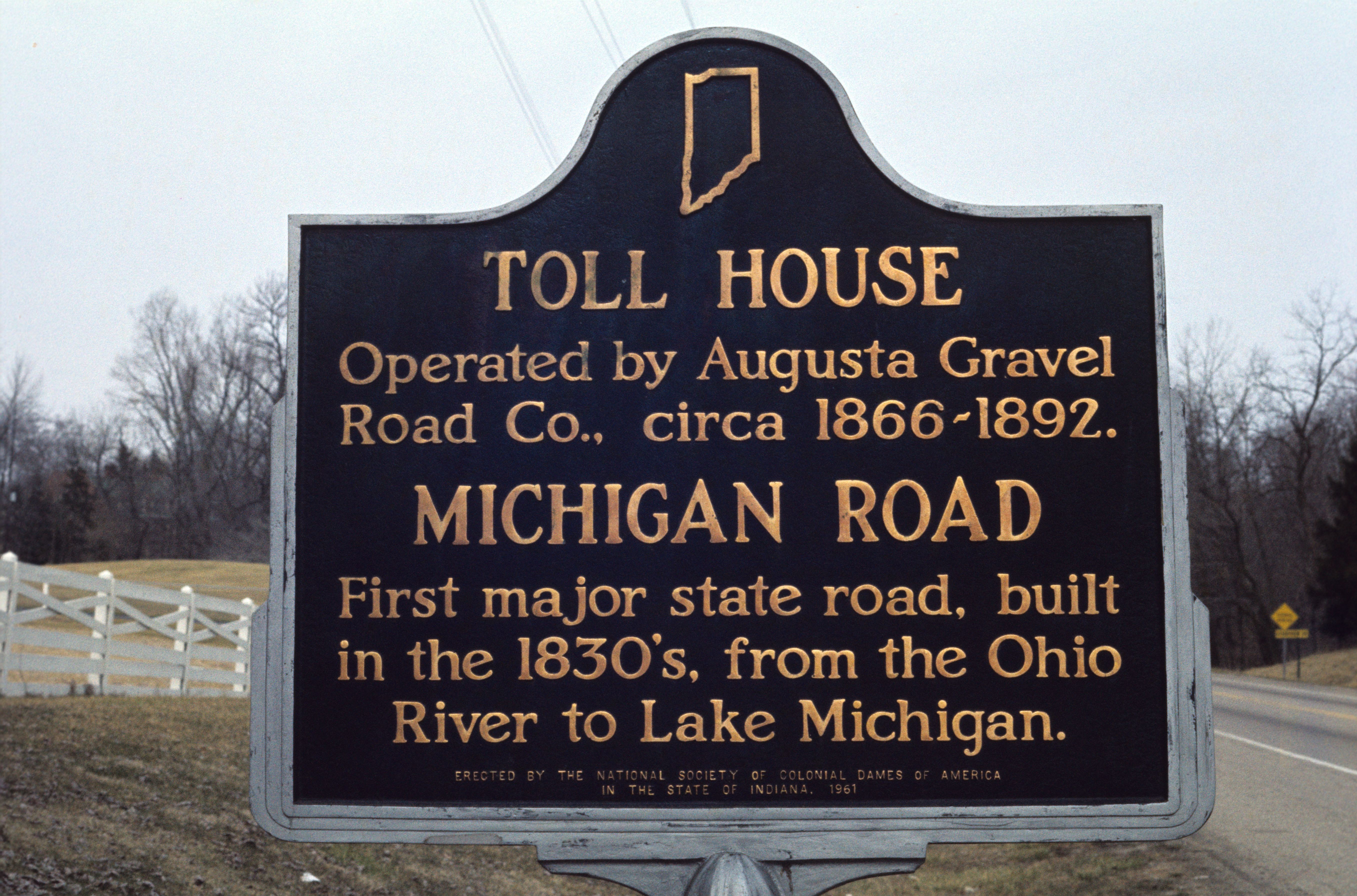

Michigan Road Toll House is a historic toll house located on the Michigan Road at Indianapolis, Indiana. It was built about 1850, as a simple one-story frame building. It was raised to two stories in 1886. The building operated as a toll house from about 1866 to 1892. The building was also used as a post office, notary public office, and general store.

It was added to the National Register of Historic Places in 1974.

== See also ==
- National Register of Historic Places listings in Marion County, Indiana
