= Democrat Township, Carroll County, Indiana =

Democrat Township
- Township
- Location of Democrat Township in Carroll County
- Coordinates: 40°28′03″N 86°31′32″W
- Country: United States
- State: Indiana
- County: Carroll

Government
  - Type: Indiana township

Area
  - Total: 29.72 sq mi (77.0 km^{2})
  - Land: 29.72 sq mi (77.0 km^{2})
  - Water: 0 sq mi (0 km^{2})
- Elevation: 741 ft (226 m)

Population (2020)
  - Total: 1,025
  - Density: 34.49/sq mi (13.32/km^{2})
- FIPS code: 18-17686
- GNIS feature ID: 453263

Democrat Township is one of fourteen townships in Carroll County, Indiana. As of the 2020 census, its population was 1,025 (up from 885 at 2010) and it contained 353 housing units.

== History ==
Democrat Township was organized in 1835.

Adams Mill and Adams Mill Covered Bridge are listed on the National Register of Historic Places.

== Geography ==
According to the 2010 census, the township has a total area of 29.72 square miles (77.0 km^{2}), all land.

=== Unincorporated towns ===
- Adams Mill
- Cutler
- Lexington
- Prince William
- Ray

=== Adjacent townships ===
- Monroe (north)
- Burlington (east)
- Warren Township, Clinton County (southeast)
- Owen Township, Clinton County (south)
- Ross Township, Clinton County (southwest)
- Clay (west)
- Madison (west)

=== Major highways ===
- Indiana State Road 75

== Education ==
Democrat Township residents may obtain a library card at the Flora-Monroe Township Public Library in Flora.
