= Gailey Hollow Farmstead =

Historic house in Arkansas, United States

- U.S. National Register of Historic Places
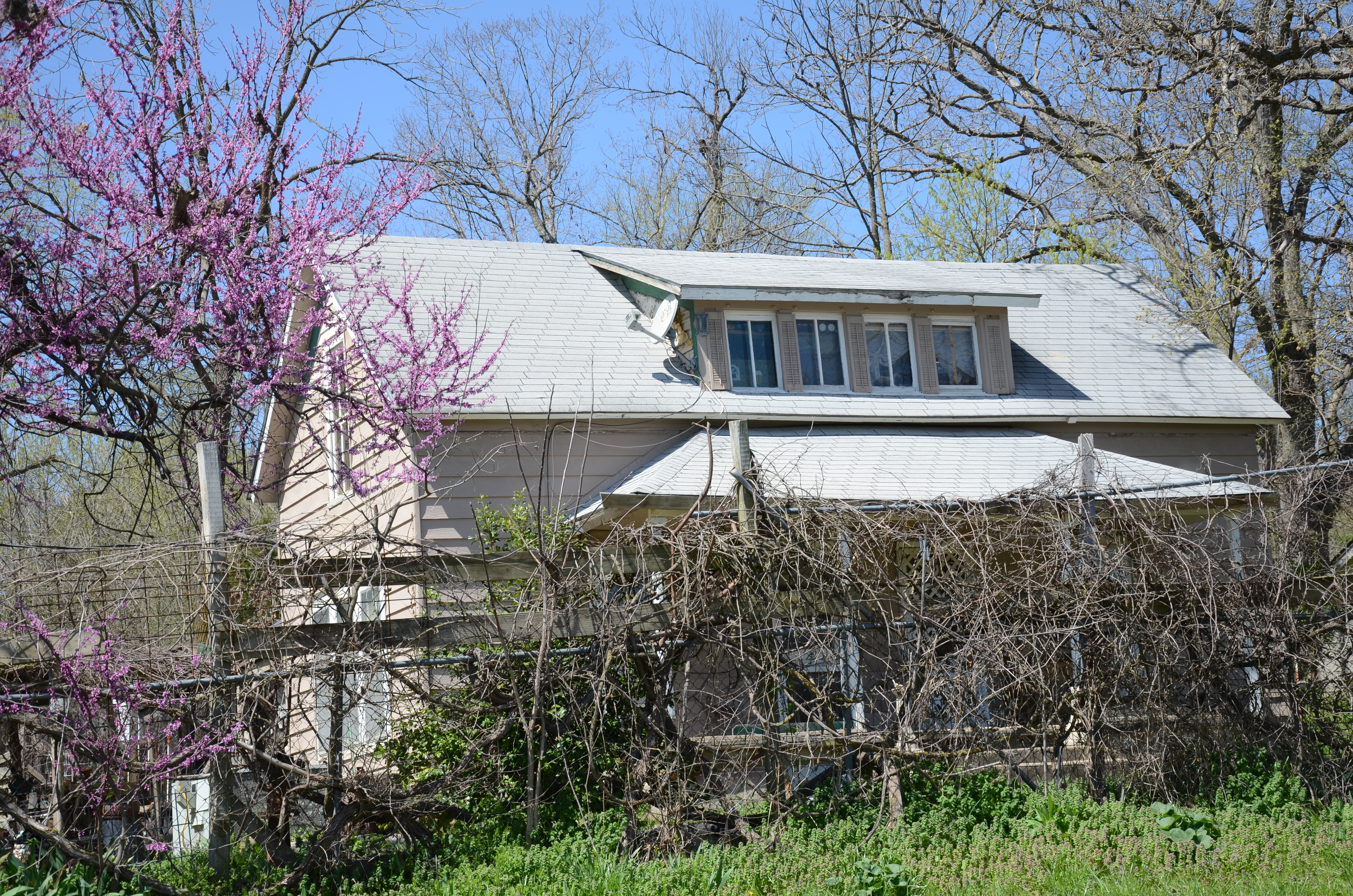

- Location within Arkansas Location within the United States
- Nearest city: Logan, Arkansas
- Coordinates: 36°12′42″N 94°22′56″W
- Area: 1.5 acres (0.61 ha)
- Built: 1910
- Architectural style: Double-Pen
- MPS: Benton County MRA
- NRHP reference No.: 87002381
- Added to NRHP: January 28, 1988

The Gailey Hollow Farmstead is a historic farm on Gailey Hollow Road in rural southern Benton County, Arkansas, north of Logan. The farm complex consists of a house and six outbuildings, and is a good example of an early 20th-century farmstead. The main house is a T-shaped double pen frame structure, 1 1/2 stories tall, with a wide shed-roof dormer across the roof of the main facade. There are shed-roof porches on either side of the rear projecting T section; the house is finished in weatherboard. The outbuildings include a barn, garage, carriage house, smoke house, chicken house, and grain crib.

The property was listed on the National Register of Historic Places in 1988.

== See also ==
- National Register of Historic Places listings in Benton County, Arkansas
