= Logan, Arkansas =

- Unincorporated community
- Location within Arkansas Location within the United States
- Coordinates: 36°12′03″N 94°23′15″W
- Country: United States
- State: Arkansas
- County: Benton
- Elevation: 1,043 ft (318 m)
- Time zone: UTC-6 (Central (CST))
  - Summer (DST): UTC-5 (CDT)
- Area code: 479
- GNIS feature ID: 72443

Logan is an unincorporated community in Benton County, Arkansas, United States, located 15.5 miles (24.9 km) southwest of Bentonville. The Gailey Hollow Farmstead and the McIntyre House, both listed on the National Register of Historic Places, are near Logan.
