= Lexington, Carroll County, Indiana =

Lexington
- Unincorporated community
- Carroll County's location in Indiana

- Location in Carroll County
- Coordinates: 40°27′32″N 86°29′20″W
- Country: United States
- State: Indiana
- County: Carroll
- Township: Democrat
- Elevation: 751 ft (229 m)
- ZIP code: 46920
- FIPS code: 18-43128
- GNIS feature ID: 437810

Lexington is an unincorporated community in Democrat Township, Carroll County, Indiana.

== History ==
Lexington was laid out in 1835.
