= Prince William, Indiana =

Prince William
- Unincorporated community
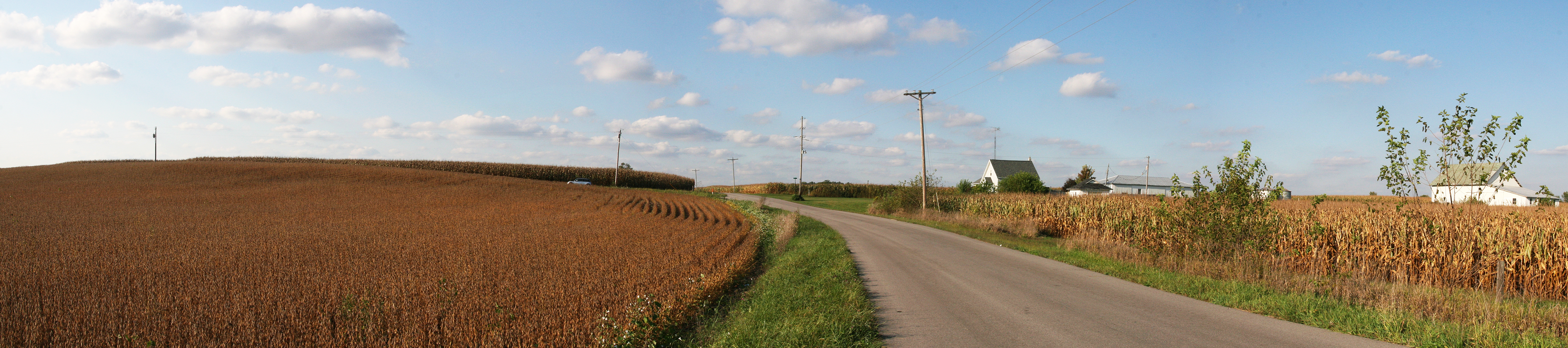

- Carroll County's location in Indiana

- Location in Carroll County
- Coordinates: 40°26′32″N 86°34′23″W
- Country: United States
- State: Indiana
- County: Carroll
- Township: Democrat
- Elevation: 722 ft (220 m)
- ZIP code: 46065
- FIPS code: 18-62075
- GNIS feature ID: 441601

Prince William is an unincorporated community in Democrat Township, Carroll County, Indiana.

Prince William was one of two initial villages when the township was organized in May 1835. It was named for Prince William, Duke of Cumberland. The Prince William post office was discontinued in 1881.

== History ==
Prince William, Indiana was founded in 1837 by Benjamin Ashba(Ashby). Prince William and Lexington were the major towns of Democrat Township until the 1870s.
