= Camden Masonic Temple =

- U.S. National Register of Historic Places
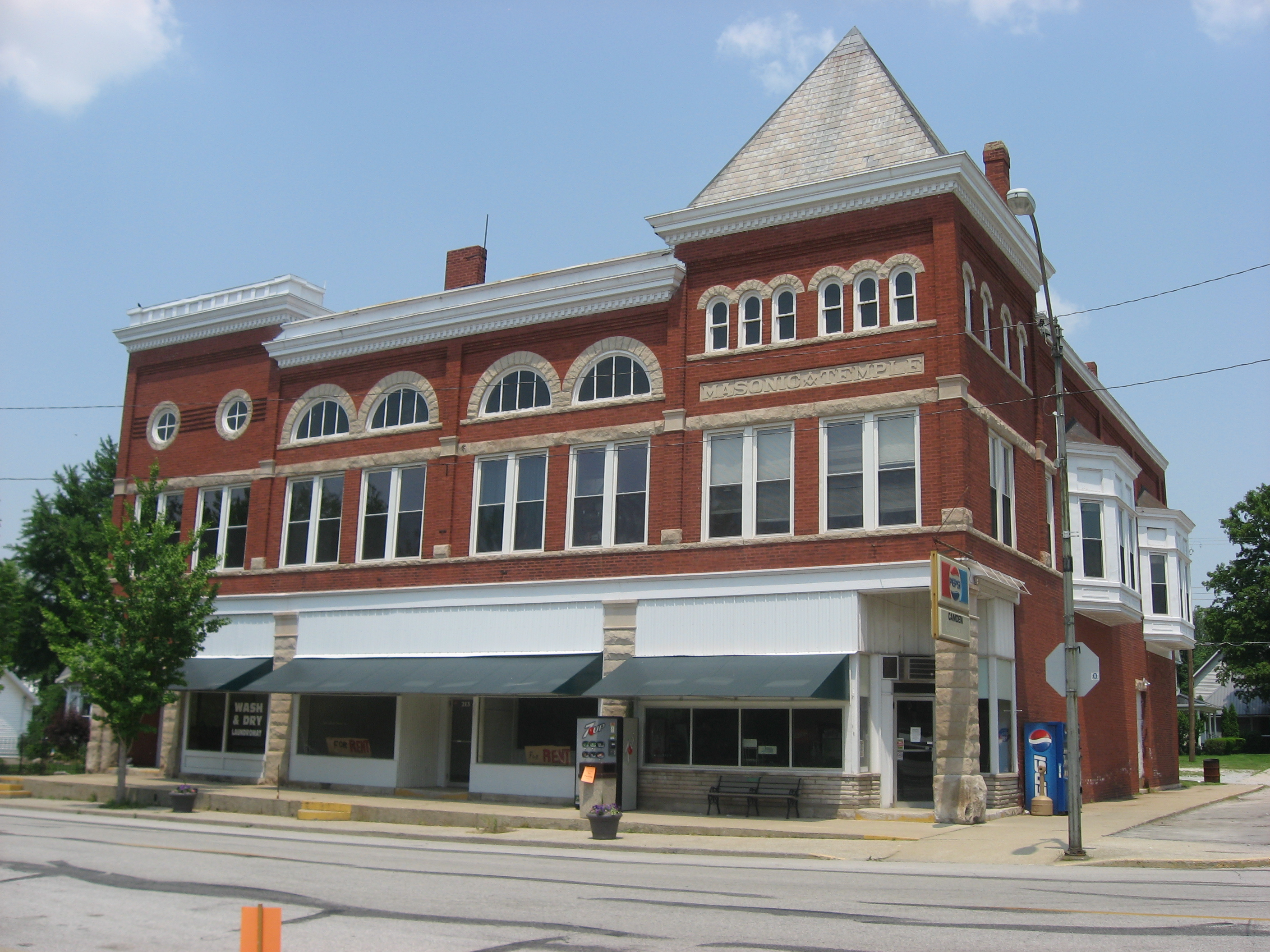
- Front of the temple

- Location within Carroll County, Indiana Location within Indiana Location within the United States
- Location: 213 W. Main St., Camden, Indiana
- Coordinates: 40°36′31″N 86°32′26″W
- Area: less than one acre
- Built: 1902
- Architect: Krutch, C.S. and Co.
- Architectural style: Romanesque
- NRHP reference No.: 03001313
- Added to NRHP: December 23, 2003

The Camden Masonic Temple, also known as Mount Zion Lodge #211, is a historic Masonic Lodge located at Camden, Indiana. It was built in 1902, and is a three-story Romanesque Revival style brick and limestone building. It was used historically as a meeting hall, as a specialty store, as a department store, as a professional building, and as a multiple dwelling.

It was listed on the National Register of Historic Places in 2003.

== See also ==
- List of Masonic buildings in Indiana
- National Register of Historic Places listings in Carroll County, Indiana
