= Michigan Road =

Road in Indiana

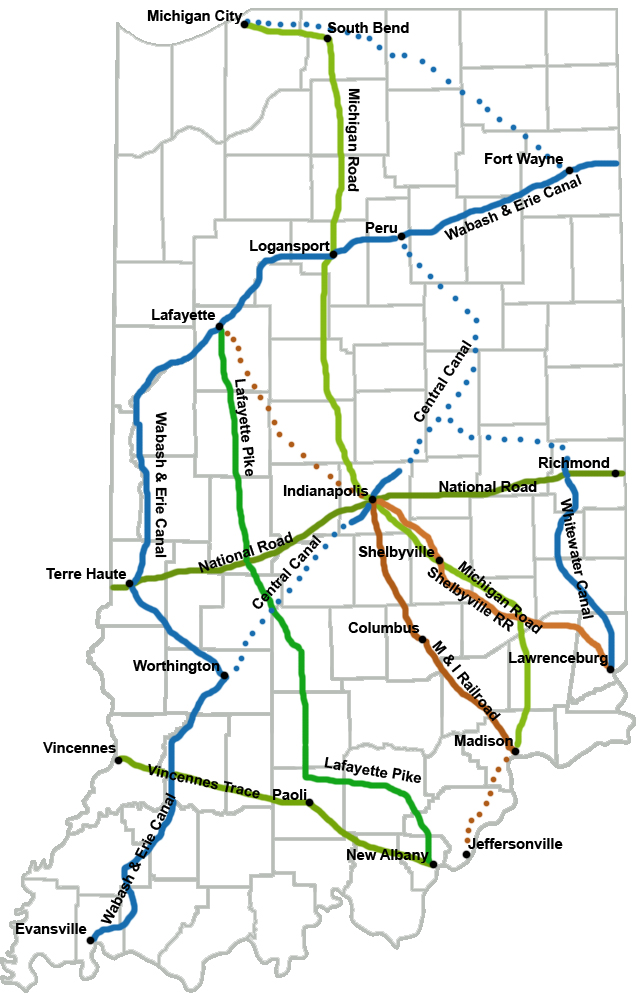
Michigan Road, as well as other early roads, in Indiana

The Michigan Road was one of the earliest roads in Indiana. Roads in early Indiana were often roads in name only. In actuality they were sometimes little more than crude paths following old animal and Native American trails and filled with sinkholes, stumps, and deep, entrapping ruts. Hoosier leaders, however, recognized the importance of roads to the growth and economic health of the state, and the needed improvements. They encouraged construction of roads which would do for Indiana what the National Road was doing for the whole country.

As early as 1821 the legislature earmarked funds for more than two dozen roads throughout the state. Road building was often the responsibility of the counties, which were empowered to call out a local labor force for construction and provide road viewers, or supervisors.

== History ==
Indiana's first "super highway" was the Michigan Road, which was built in the 1830s and 1840s and ran from Madison to Michigan City via Indianapolis. Like the National Road, it did much to spur settlement and economic growth. Half of the pioneers to settle northwestern Indiana did so by using the Michigan Road to travel from the Ohio River to their destination. It was the "most ambitious" project to connect Indianapolis with the rest of the state.

One of the things that made the road possible was a treaty the state of Indiana forged with the Pottawatomie on October 16, 1826. Governor James B. Ray led the negotiations. It allowed for a ribbon of land 100 feet (30 m) wide to stretch from the Ohio River (at Madison) to Lake Michigan (Michigan City). The Pottawatomie left the region by that very road when the last of their tribe was forcibly removed in the 1838 Pottawatomie Trail of Death.

A commission was selected in 1828 to route the road from Indianapolis to Lake Michigan. It was told to make the trailhead be the best harbor, preferably natural, that could be had with Lake Michigan. The Kankakee River's swamp posed a problem for the construction of the road, forcing the commission to avoid a more direct northwesterly route and instead have it go from Logansport, straight up to the south bend of the St Joseph River (now the city of South Bend), and then west to Lake Michigan. Michigan City was formally selected to be the trailend in 1832.

The route from Madison to Indianapolis was straighter. From Madison it went north through Ripley and Jefferson counties straight to Napoleon, and from there straight through Shelby County to Indianapolis.

It proved to be the preferred route to Indianapolis for 34 separate counties, even through the road went through only 14 counties. In 1836, the Indiana General Assembly passed the Mammoth Internal Improvement Act, which provided funds to pave the entire length of the road. However, the economic difficulties brought on by overspending and the Panic of 1837 caused the state to enter partial bankruptcy before the entire length could be paved. The situation forced Indiana to give control of the road to the individual counties as part of a plan to avoid losing it to the state's creditors.

== Today ==
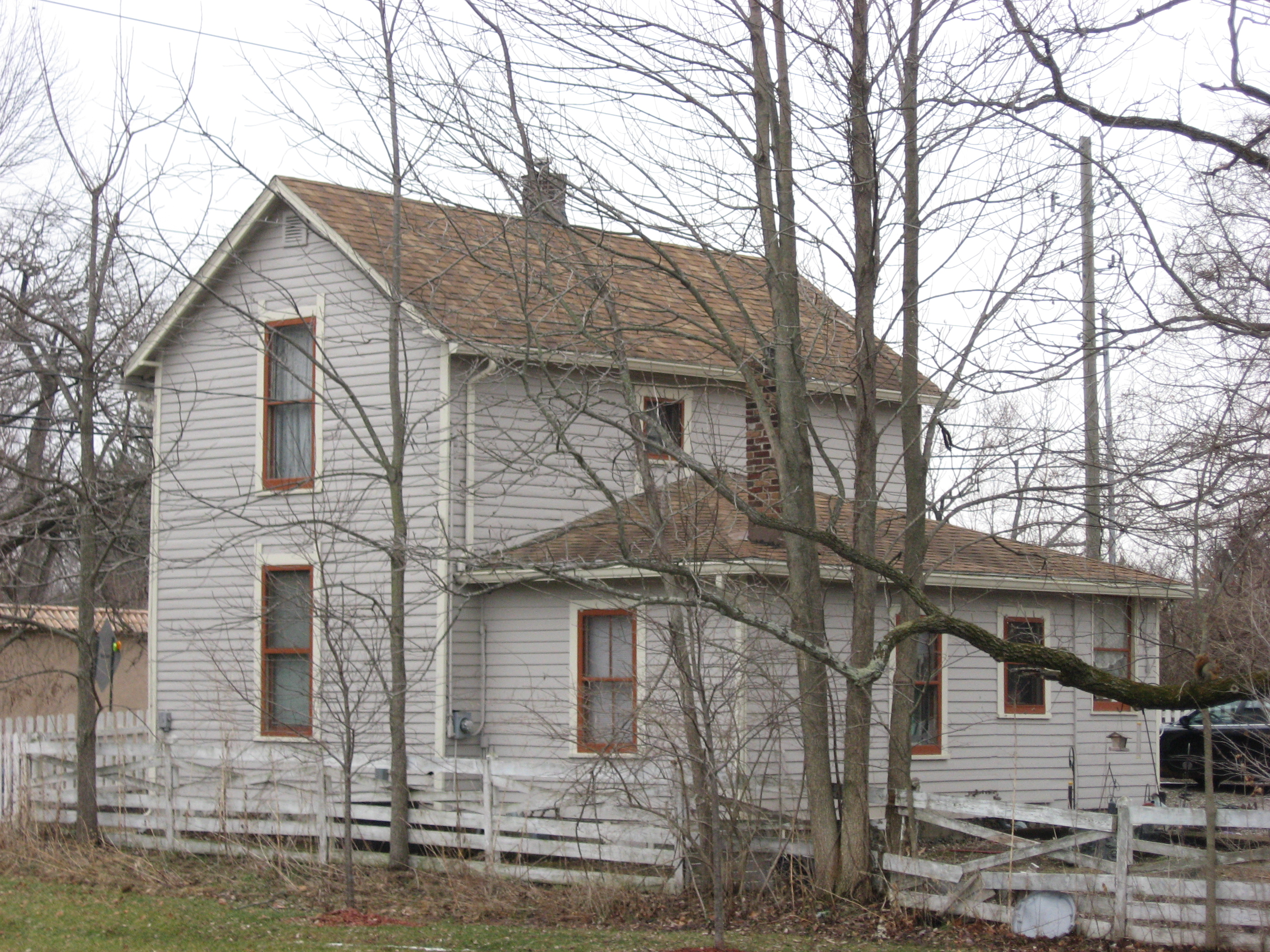
The former tollhouse erected by the Augusta Gravel Road Company along the road in Indianapolis

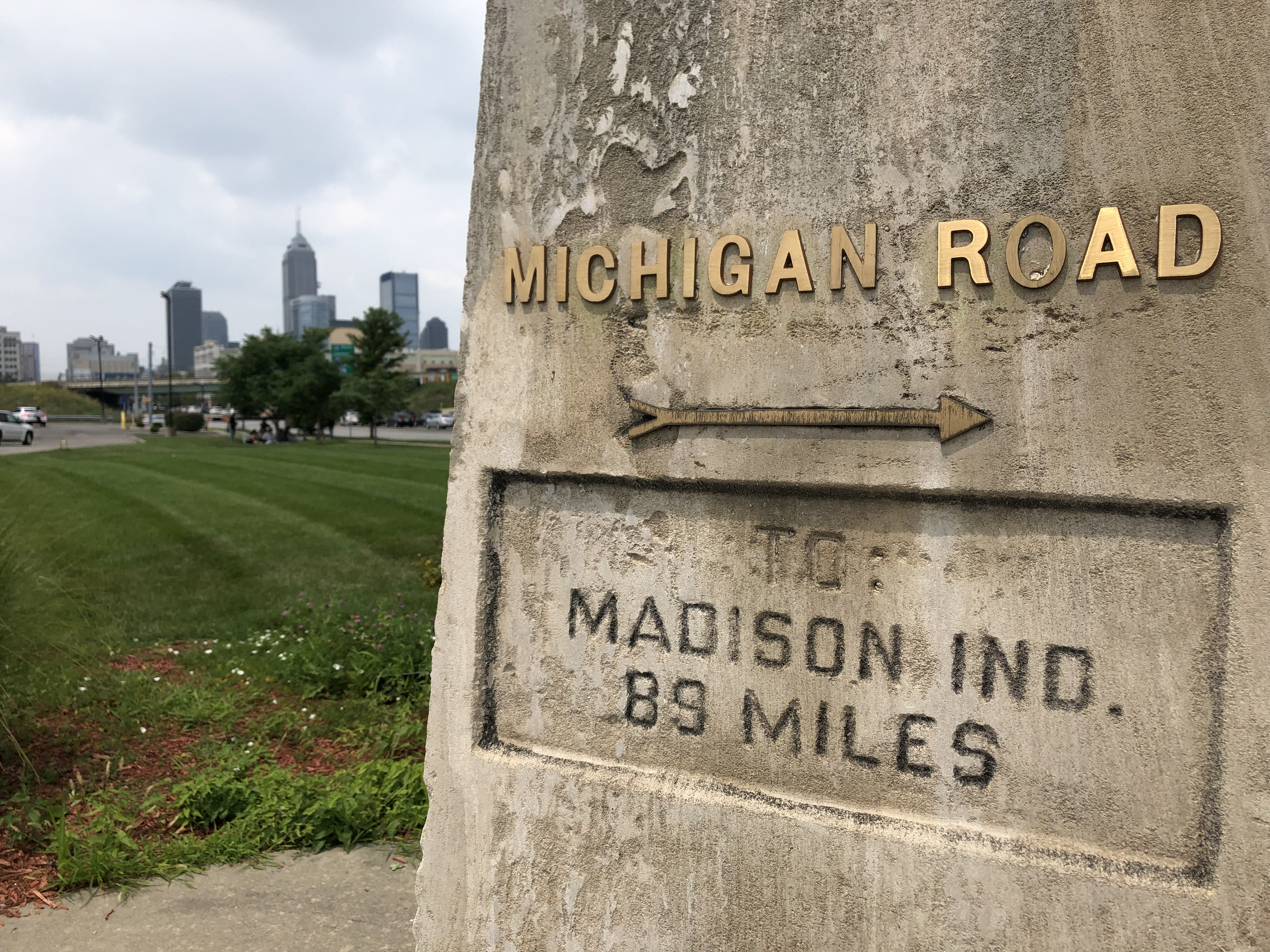
An obelisk monument near the historic intersection of the Michigan and National roads in Indianapolis

State Road 29, originally much longer, followed the route from Madison to Bryantsburg, and from Napoleon in the south to Logansport in the north. State Road 25 followed the original route to Rochester, and U.S. Route 31 followed the original route from Rochester to South Bend. State Road 2 and U.S. Route 20 follow the original road from South Bend to Michigan City.

The later U.S. Route 421 replaced Indiana State Road 29 from Madison to near Boyleston. The original route for US 421 was altered when Interstate 465 was constructed. A more "truck friendly" route was also built from Madison to North Madison.

The original US 31 has been bypassed in several locations, most notably, in terms of the Michigan Road, from Rochester to north of Plymouth. SR 29 from the south into Logansport has been decommissioned, as has the entire route (that which remains) from the junction of I-74 and US 421 north of Greensburg to the junction of I-465 and US 421 on the northwest side of Indianapolis.

In Indianapolis, a few remnants of the road still remain. A tollhouse stands just north of the White River. It was erected by the Augusta Gravel Road Company to recoup its costs in repairing the road.

A monument marking the intersection of the Michigan Road and the National Road sits at the corner of Washington Street and Southeastern Avenue near downtown Indianapolis. The monument was relocated slightly as part of the changes to Interstate 65 exits in 2008.

The road received a State Byway Designation in 2011.

== See also ==
- Buffalo Trace (road)
- Michigan Avenue or the Chicago Road, an early road connecting Detroit and Chicago
- Sycamore Row (road)
