= Wales Adams =

American politician

Wales Adams (March 2, 1804 – November 2, 1879) was a member of the Michigan House of Representative from 1844-1845. Adams was a native of Massachusetts. In 1831 he founded Adams Mills, Michigan. He died in Bronson, Michigan.

== Sources ==
- Romig, Walter (1986). Michigan Place Names. Detroit: Wayne State University Press. p. 10. ISBN 978-0-8143-1838-6 – via Google Books.
