= Adams Township, Carroll County, Indiana =

Township in Indiana, United States

Adams Township
- Township
- Location of Adams Township in Carroll County
- Coordinates: 40°42′13″N 86°36′39″W
- Country: United States
- State: Indiana
- County: Carroll

Government
  - Type: Indiana township

Area
  - Total: 25.99 sq mi (67.3 km^{2})
  - Land: 25.67 sq mi (66.5 km^{2})
  - Water: 0.32 sq mi (0.83 km^{2})
- Elevation: 699 ft (213 m)

Population (2020)
  - Total: 495
  - Density: 19.3/sq mi (7.45/km^{2})
- FIPS code: 18-00316
- GNIS feature ID: 453074

Adams Township is one of fourteen townships in Carroll County, Indiana. As of the 2020 census, its population was 495 (down from 516 at 2010) and it contained 211 housing units.

== History ==
Adams Township was organized in 1828.

The Burris House and Potawatomi Spring, Carrollton Bridge, and Wabash and Erie Canal Culvert No. 100 are listed on the National Register of Historic Places.

== Geography ==
According to the 2010 census, the township has a total area of 25.99 square miles (67.3 km^{2}), of which 25.67 square miles (66.5 km^{2}) (or 98.77%) is land and 0.32 square miles (0.83 km^{2}) (or 1.23%) is water.

=== Unincorporated towns ===
- Lockport

=== Adjacent townships ===
- Jackson Township, White County (north)
- Jefferson Township, Cass County (northeast)
- Clinton Township, Cass County (east)
- Liberty (east)
- Rock Creek (southeast)
- Deer Creek (south)
- Tippecanoe (southwest)
- Jefferson (west)
- Lincoln Township, White County (northwest)

=== Cemeteries ===
The township contains three cemeteries: Great Eastern, Johnson City and Seceder.

== Education ==
Adams Township residents may obtain a library card at the Delphi Public Library in Delphi.
