= McIntyre House (Logan, Arkansas) =

Historic house in Arkansas, United States

- Formerly listed on the U.S. National Register of Historic Places
- Location within Arkansas Location within the United States
- Nearest city: Logan, Arkansas
- Coordinates: 36°12′13″N 94°22′11″W
- Area: less than one acre
- Built: 1910
- Architectural style: Queen Anne
- MPS: Benton County MRA
- NRHP reference No.: 87002382

Significant dates
- Added to NRHP: January 28, 1988
- Removed from NRHP: October 14, 2026

The McIntyre House is a historic house in rural Benton County, Arkansas, near the community of Logan. It is a 1 1/2-story wood-frame structure, with clapboard siding and a wide clipped-gable roof. A shed-roof porch extends across the front, supported by turned columns and simple decorative woodwork. Built c. 1910, the house is an excellent local example of a rural vernacular Queen Anne farmhouse.

The house was listed on the National Register of Historic Places in 1988.

== See also ==
- National Register of Historic Places listings in Benton County, Arkansas
