= J. McIntyre Farm =

- U.S. National Register of Historic Places
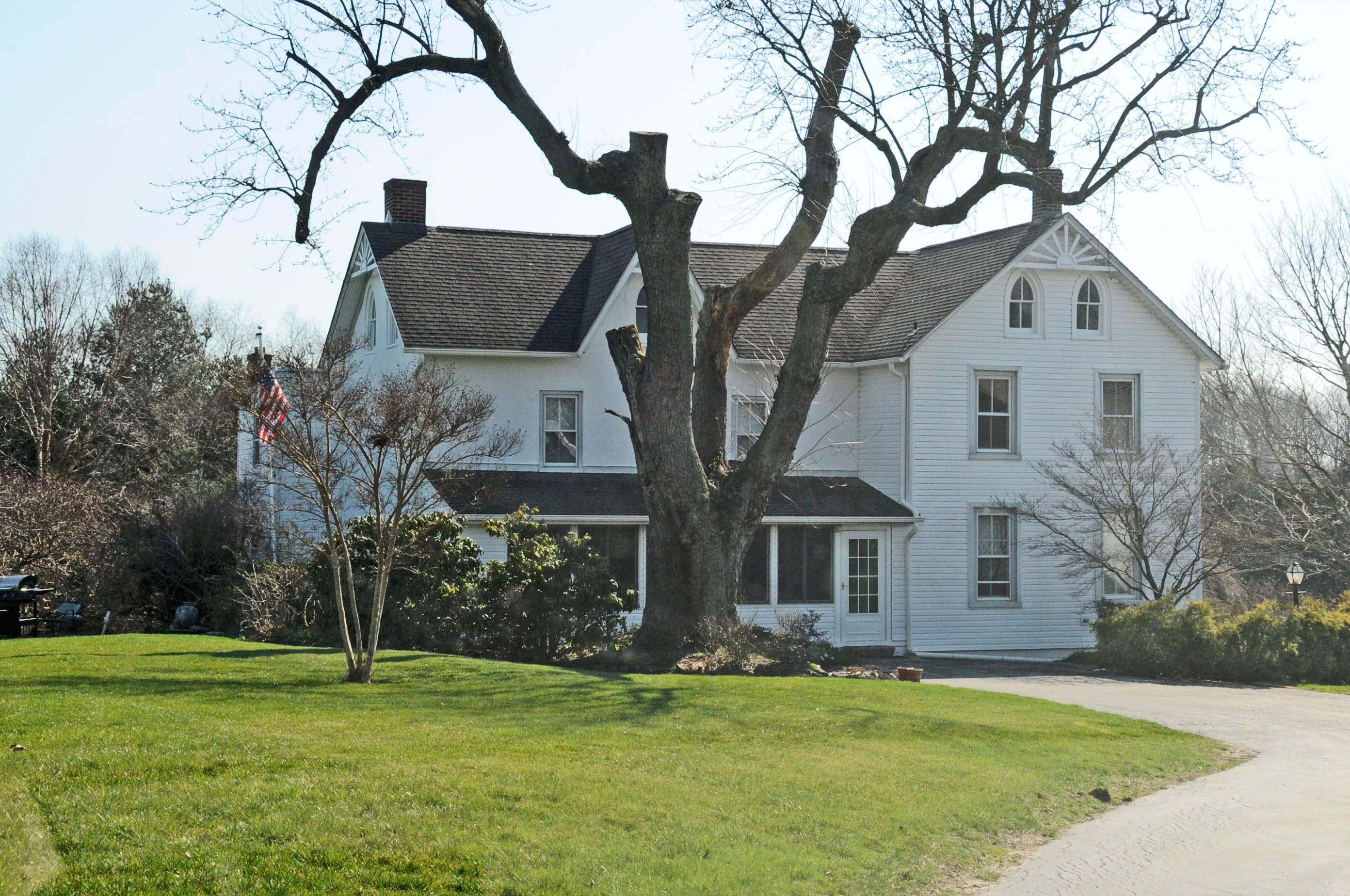

- Location within Delaware Location within the United States
- Location: 6464 Limestone Rd., near Newark, Delaware
- Coordinates: 39.77625°N 75.72254°W
- Area: 50 acres (20 ha)
- Built: c. 1830
- Architectural style: Gothic, Bi-level barn
- MPS: Agricultural Buildings and Complexes in Mill Creek Hundred, 1800-1840 TR
- NRHP reference No.: 86003098
- Added to NRHP: November 13, 1986

J. McIntyre Farm is a historic farm located near Newark, New Castle County, Delaware. The property includes five contributing buildings. They are a stuccoed brick house with frame Gothic Revival style additions, a stone bank barn (c. 1830), and three late 19th century outbuildings: a braced frame corn crib, a braced frame machine shed, and a two-story granary covered with corrugated metal siding. The house is a two-story, three-bay, brick building with an added central cross-gable, and a frame wing extending from its west endwall. The barn walls are constructed of large, dark fieldstones with large, rectangular quoins, and in places is covered with a pebbled stucco.

It was added to the National Register of Historic Places in 1986.
