= Deer Creek Valley Rural Historic District =

Historic district in Indiana, United States

- U.S. National Register of Historic Places
- U.S. Historic district
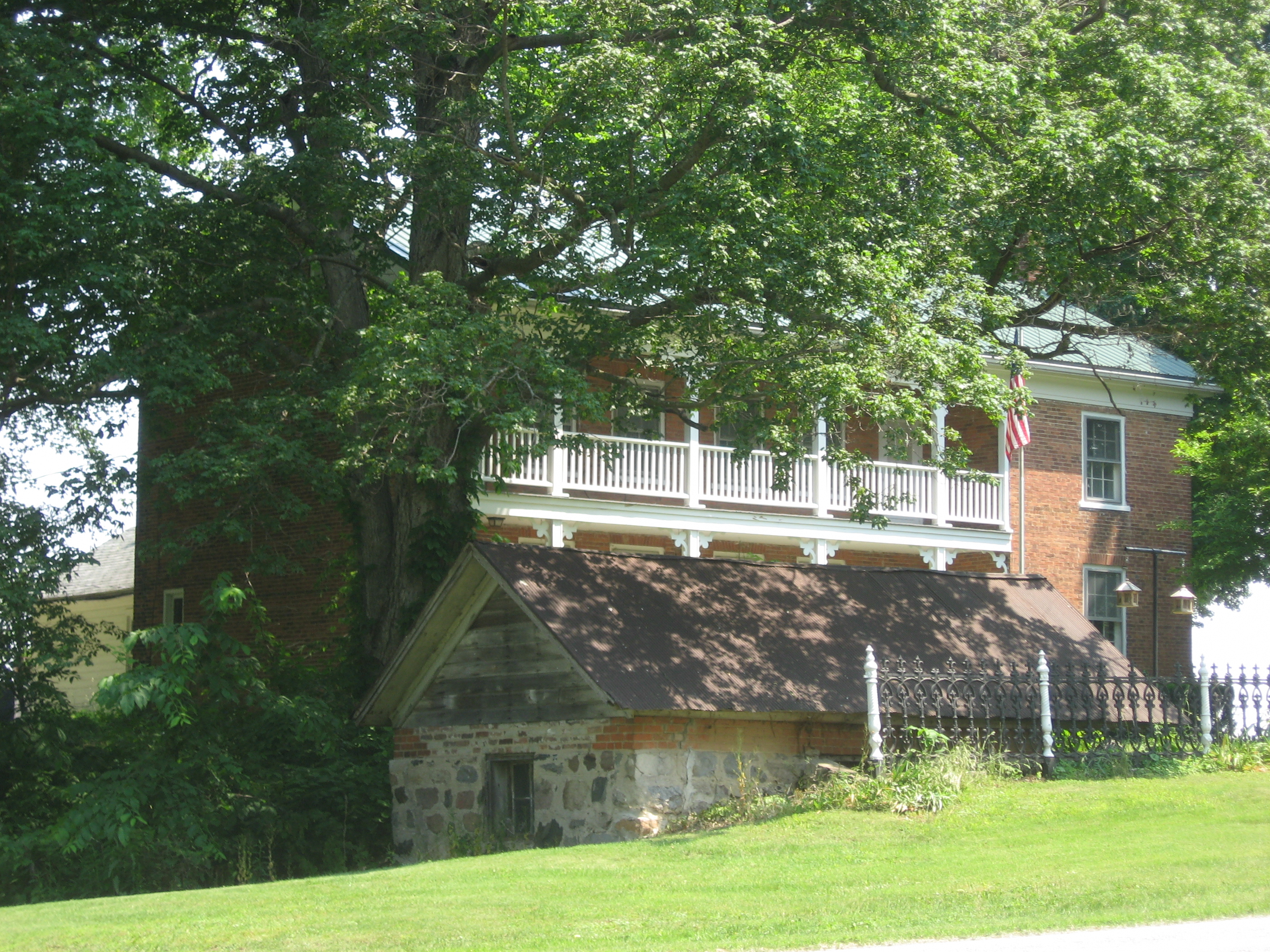
- Mears family farmhouse and springhouse, June 2011

- Location within Carroll County, Indiana Location within Indiana Location within the United States
- Location: Southeastern corner of Sec. 21, most of Sec. 22, and areas north of Deer Creek, east of Delphi, Deer Creek Township, Carroll County, Indiana
- Coordinates: 40°35′35″N 86°37′49″W
- Area: 770 acres (310 ha)
- Architectural style: Greek Revival, Gothic Revival, et al
- NRHP reference No.: 02001557
- Added to NRHP: December 19, 2002

Deer Creek Valley Rural Historic District is a national historic district located in Deer Creek Township, Carroll County, Indiana. It encompasses 44 contributing buildings, 17 contributing sites, and 13 contributing structures on 20 historic properties near Delphi, Indiana. It includes several farmsteads, four cemeteries, two bridges (High Bridge and the separately listed Wilson Bridge), the Monon railroad right of way, the Delphi-Camden Road, and Deer Creek and its slate bluffs. Notable farmsteads include the Mears Family Farmstead with a two-story Greek Revival style brick farmhouse.

It was listed on the National Register of Historic Places in 2002.
