= Andrew Thomas House =

Historic house in Indiana, United States

- U.S. National Register of Historic Places
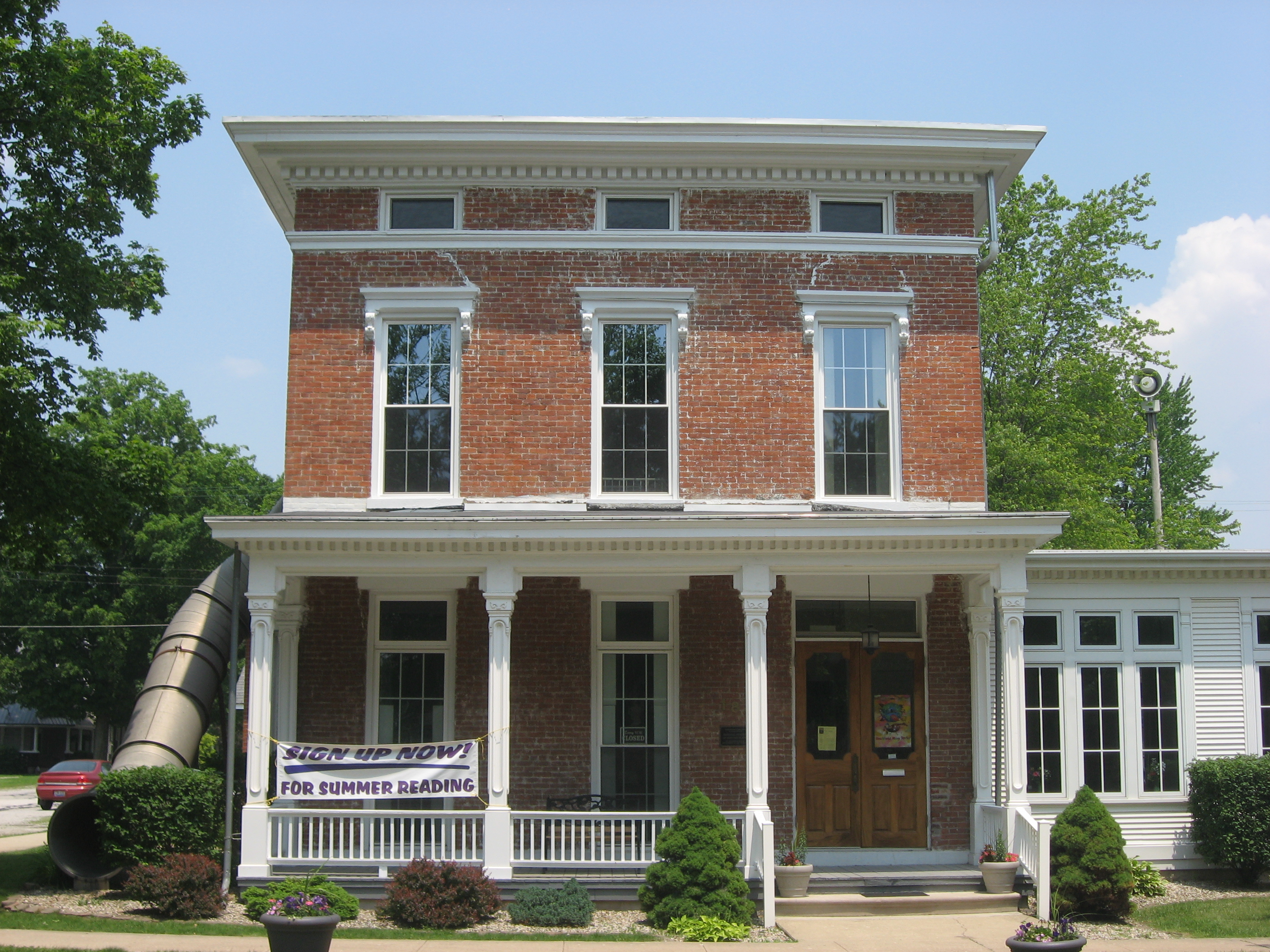
- Andrew Thomas House, June 2011

- Location within Carroll County, Indiana Location within Indiana Location within the United States
- Location: W Main St., Camden, Indiana
- Coordinates: 40°36′31″N 86°32′26″W
- Area: less than one acre
- Built: 1869
- Architectural style: Greek Revival, Italianate
- NRHP reference No.: 84000485
- Added to NRHP: December 27, 1984

Andrew Thomas House, also known as Camden-Jackson Township Public Library, is a historic home located at Camden, Indiana. It was built in 1869, and is a 2 1/2-story, transitional Greek Revival / Italianate style brick dwelling. It measures approximately 27 feet, 6 inches, wide and 65 feet deep. It features a full-width, one-story front porch. In 1969, the building was acquired for use as a community library.

It was listed on the National Register of Historic Places in 2003.
