= Carrollton Bridge =

- U.S. National Register of Historic Places
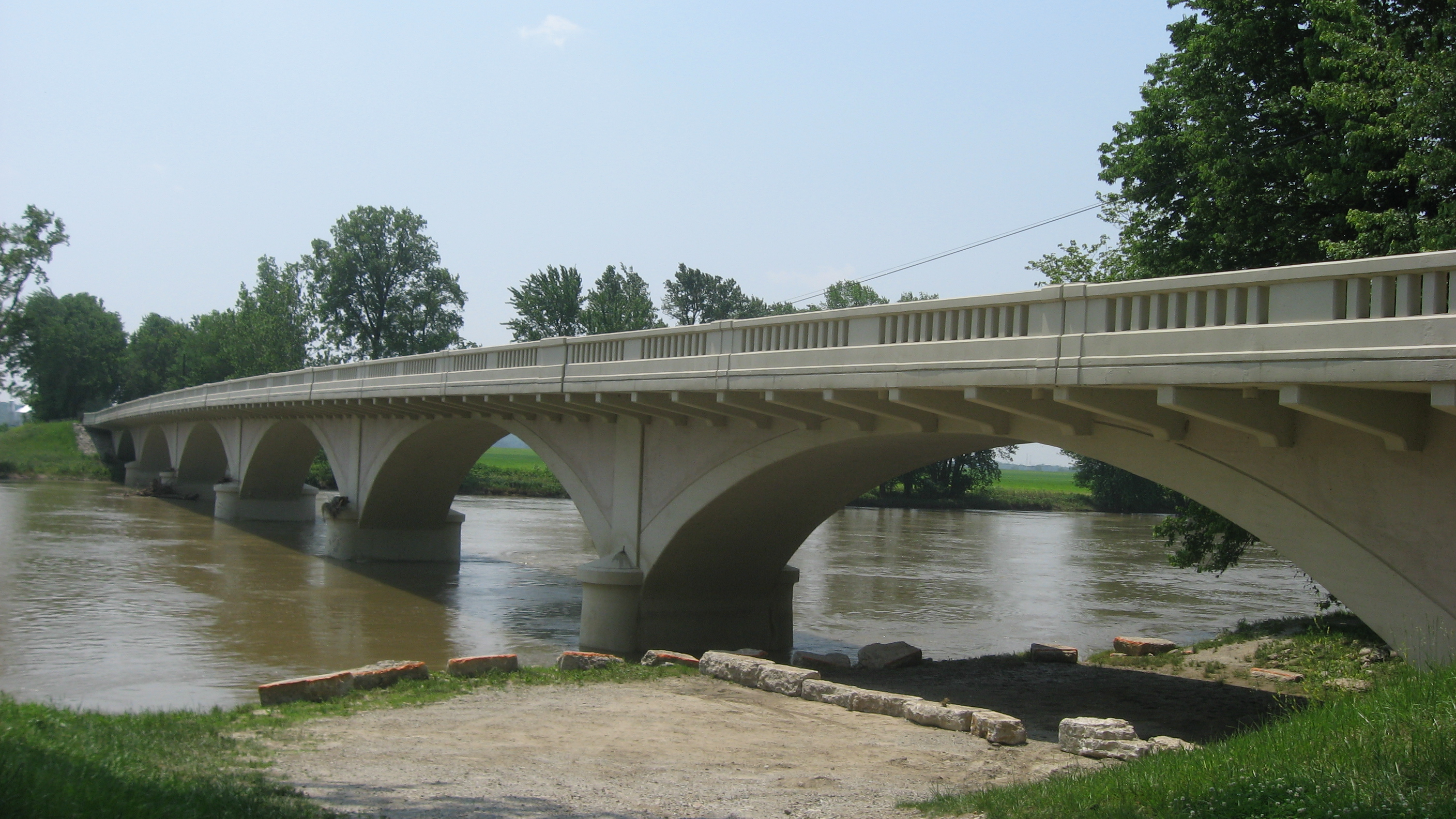
- Carrollton Bridge, June 2011

- Location within Carroll County, Indiana Location within Indiana Location within the United States
- Location: Carrollton Rd. across the Wabash River, north of Delphi, Adams, Deer Creek, and Tippecanoe Township, Carroll County, Indiana
- Coordinates: 40°38′54″N 86°39′24″W
- Area: less than one acre
- Architect: Luten, Daniel B.; National Concrete Co.
- Architectural style: Closed-Spandrel Arch
- NRHP reference No.: 03000539
- Added to NRHP: June 22, 2003

Carrollton Bridge, also known as Carroll County Bridge #132, is a historic closed-spandrel arch bridge that spans the Wabash River in Adams Township, Deer Creek Township, and Tippecanoe Township, Carroll County, Indiana. It was designed by Daniel B. Luten and built in 1927. It consists of six reinforced concrete arches. It has an overall length of 619 feet 4 inches (188.77 m).

It was listed on the National Register of Historic Places in 2003.
