= Camden, Indiana =

- Town
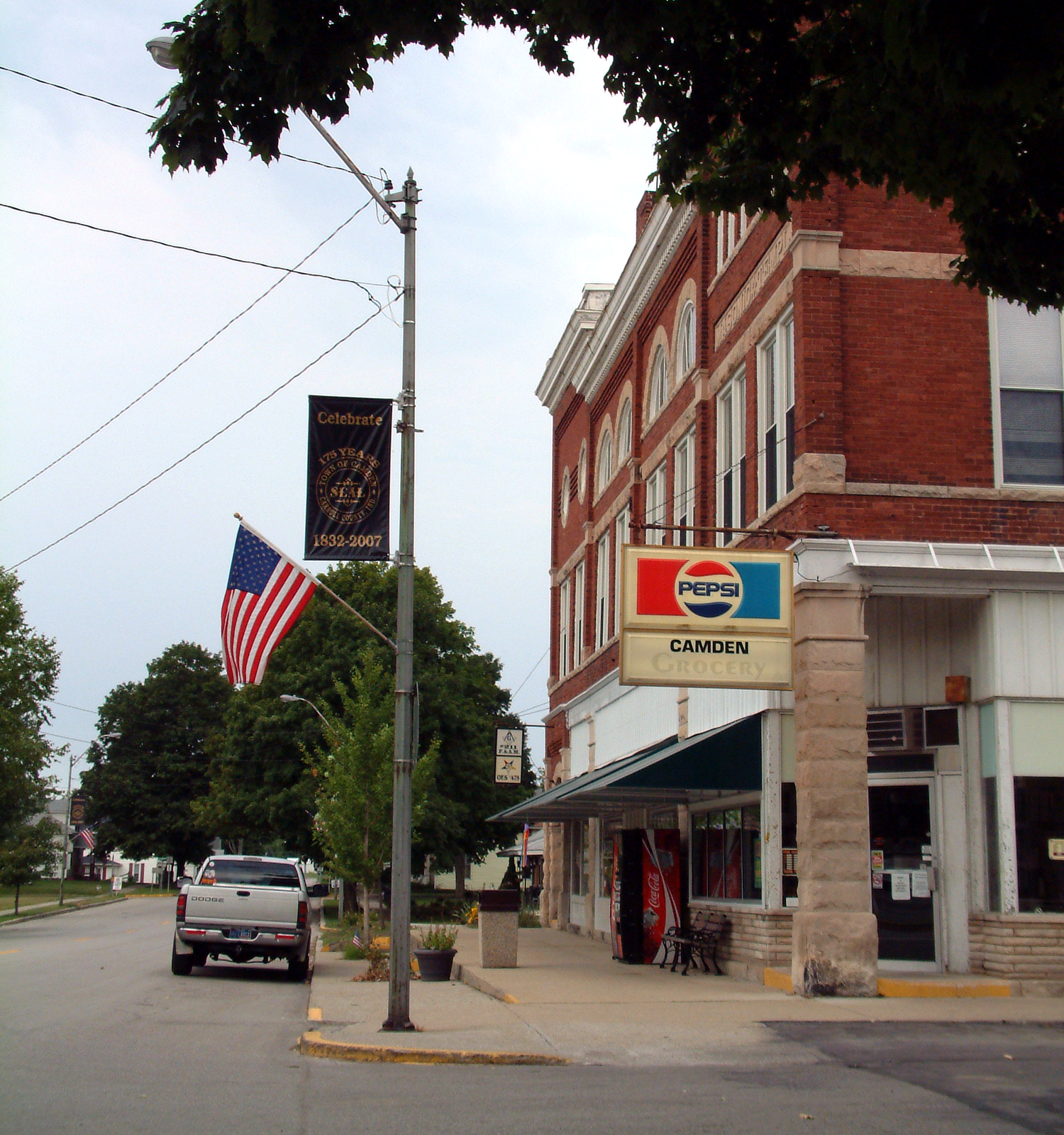
- Looking west along Main Street in Camden

- Location of Camden in Carroll County, Indiana.
- Coordinates: 40°36′36″N 86°32′22″W
- Country: United States
- State: Indiana
- County: Carroll
- Township: Jackson

Area
  - Total: 0.26 sq mi (0.67 km^{2})
  - Land: 0.26 sq mi (0.67 km^{2})
  - Water: 0 sq mi (0.00 km^{2})
- Elevation: 676 ft (206 m)

Population (2020)
  - Total: 593
  - Density: 2,291.2/sq mi (884.65/km^{2})
- Time zone: UTC−5 (EST)
  - Summer (DST): UTC−5 (EST)
- ZIP code: 46917
- Area code: 574
- FIPS code: 18-09910
- GNIS feature ID: 2396624
- Website: www.townofcamden.org

Camden is a town in Jackson Township, Carroll County, Indiana, United States. As of the 2020 census, Camden had a population of 593. It is part of the Lafayette, Indiana Metropolitan Statistical Area.

== History ==
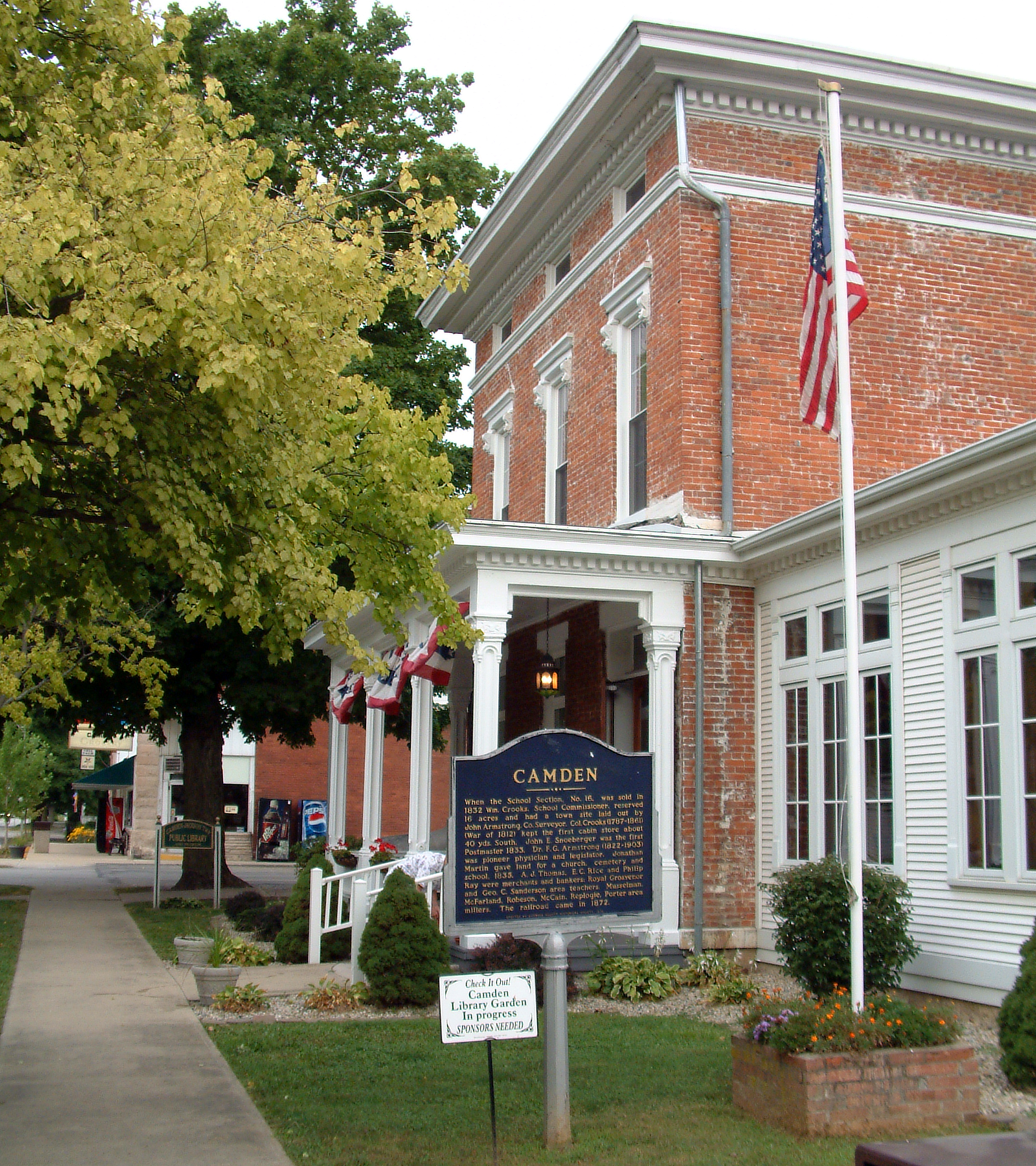
The former Andrew Thomas House and historical marker on West Main Street is now the Jackson Township Public Library and Museum.

The post office at Camden was established in 1833. Camden was platted as a town in 1836.

The Camden Masonic Temple, New 1952 Camden High School Gymnasium and Andrew Thomas House are listed on the National Register of Historic Places.

== Geography ==
Camden is located in Jackson Township.

According to the 2010 census, Camden has a total area of 0.26 square miles (0.67 km^{2}), all land.

== Demographics ==
Historical population
Census	Pop.	Note	%±
1850	168		—
1860	316		88.1%
1870	476		50.6%
1880	457		−4.0%
1910	557		—
1920	597		7.2%
1930	538		−9.9%
1940	590		9.7%
1950	600		1.7%
1960	601		0.2%
1970	577		−4.0%
1980	618		7.1%
1990	607		−1.8%
2000	582		−4.1%
2010	611		5.0%
2020	593		−2.9%
U.S. Decennial Census

=== 2010 census ===
As of the census of 2010, there were 611 people, 249 households, and 161 families living in the town. The population density was 2,350.0 inhabitants per square mile (907.3/km^{2}). There were 271 housing units at an average density of 1,042.3 per square mile (402.4/km^{2}). The racial makeup of the town was 98.2% White, 0.3% African American, 0.2% Native American, and 1.3% from two or more races.

There were 249 households, of which 31.3% had children under the age of 18 living with them, 50.2% were married couples living together, 8.8% had a female householder with no husband present, 5.6% had a male householder with no wife present, and 35.3% were non-families. 32.9% of all households were made up of individuals, and 19.7% had someone living alone who was 65 years of age or older. The average household size was 2.45 and the average family size was 3.04.

The median age in the town was 40.2 years. 25.2% of residents were under the age of 18; 7% were between the ages of 18 and 24; 23.3% were from 25 to 44; 26.7% were from 45 to 64; and 17.8% were 65 years of age or older. The gender makeup of the town was 47.6% male and 52.4% female.

=== 2000 census ===
As of the census of 2000, there were 582 people, 233 households, and 160 families living in the town. The population density was 2,240.7 inhabitants per square mile (865.1/km^{2}). There were 248 housing units at an average density of 954.8 per square mile (368.7/km^{2}). The racial makeup of the town was 98.97% White, 0.69% Native American, and 0.34% from two or more races.

There were 233 households, out of which 34.8% had children under the age of 18 living with them, 59.7% were married couples living together, 6.0% had a female householder with no husband present, and 31.3% were non-families. 28.3% of all households were made up of individuals, and 18.5% had someone living alone who was 65 years of age or older. The average household size was 2.50 and the average family size was 3.10.

In the town, the population was spread out, with 27.8% under the age of 18, 5.8% from 18 to 24, 29.0% from 25 to 44, 19.2% from 45 to 64, and 18.0% who were 65 years of age or older. The median age was 36 years. For every 100 females, there were 90.2 males. For every 100 females age 18 and over, there were 82.6 males.

The median income for a household in the town was $44,250, and the median income for a family was $53,750. Males had a median income of $30,083 versus $22,174 for females. The per capita income for the town was $19,476. About 1.3% of families and 4.2% of the population were below the poverty line, including none of those under age 18 and 21.2% of those age 65 or over.

== Education ==
The town has a free lending library, the Camden-Jackson Township Public Library.

== Plain community ==
The Old Brethren German Baptists, a small Christian Old Order horse and buggy community, that many erroneously perceive as Amish, has its center near Camden.

== Notable people ==
- American Idol (season 7) contestant Amanda Overmyer.
- Claude Raymond Wickard - Secretary of Agriculture from 1940 to 1945.
