= Wilson Bridge (Delphi, Indiana) =

- U.S. National Register of Historic Places
- U.S. Historic district – Contributing property
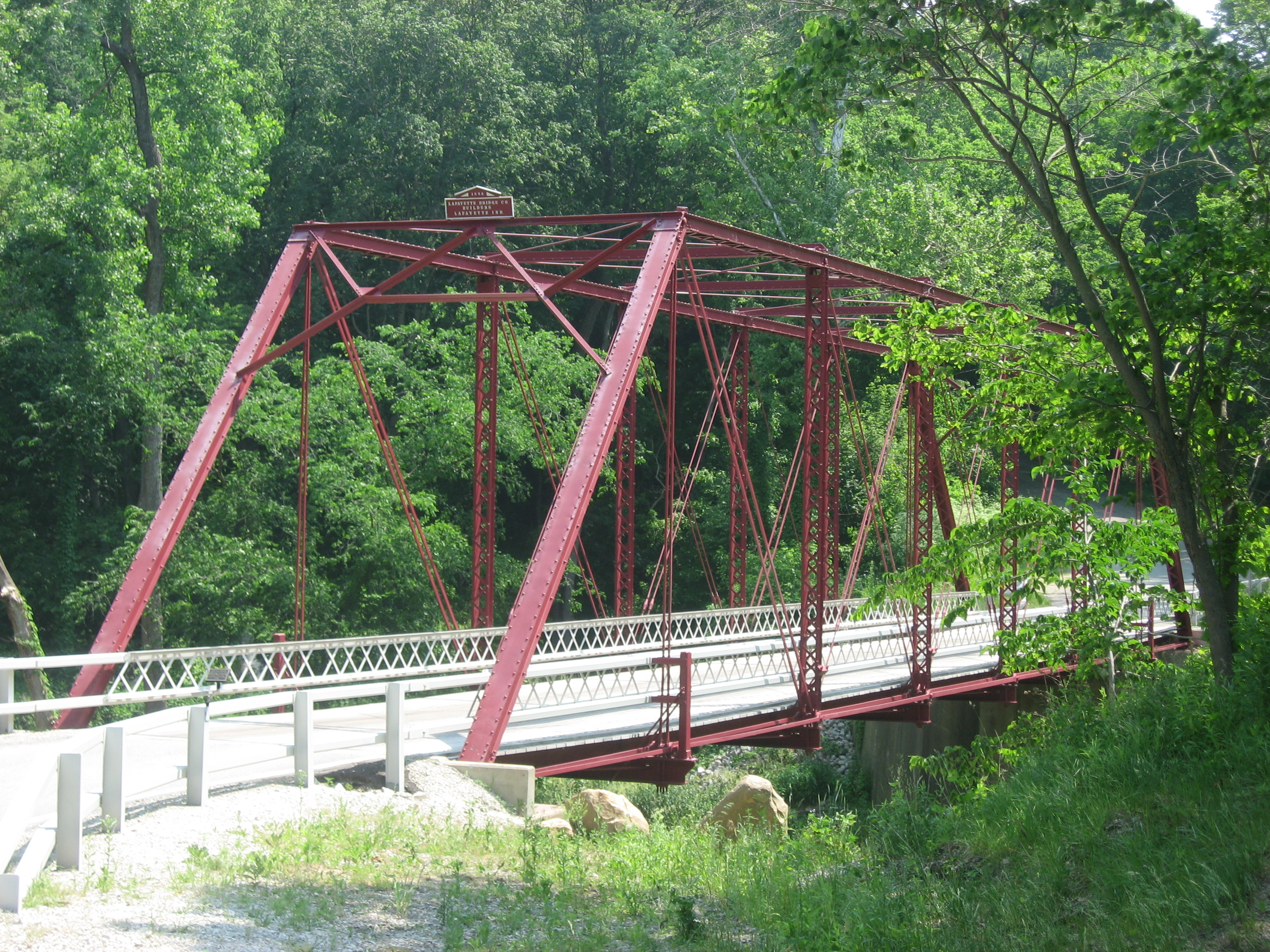
- Wilson Bridge over Deer Creek, June 2011

- Location within Carroll County, Indiana Location within Indiana Location within the United States
- Location: 0.6 miles west of County Road 450W on County Road 300N over Deer Creek, east of Delphi, Deer Creek Township, Carroll County, Indiana
- Coordinates: 40°35′27″N 86°37′16″W
- Area: less than one acre
- Built: 1897-1898
- Built by: Lafayette Bridge Co.; Smith, Craver
- Architectural style: Pratt through truss
- NRHP reference No.: 01000623
- Added to NRHP: June 6, 2001

Wilson Bridge, also known as Old Royster Ford and Carroll County Bridge No. 121, is a historic Pratt through truss bridge that spans Deer Creek and is located in Deer Creek Township, Carroll County, Indiana. It was built by the Lafayette Bridge Company in 1897–1898. It measures 122 feet long and 14 feet high.

It was listed on the National Register of Historic Places in 2001. It is located in the Deer Creek Valley Rural Historic District.
