= Deer Creek Township, Carroll County, Indiana =

Deer Creek Township
- Township
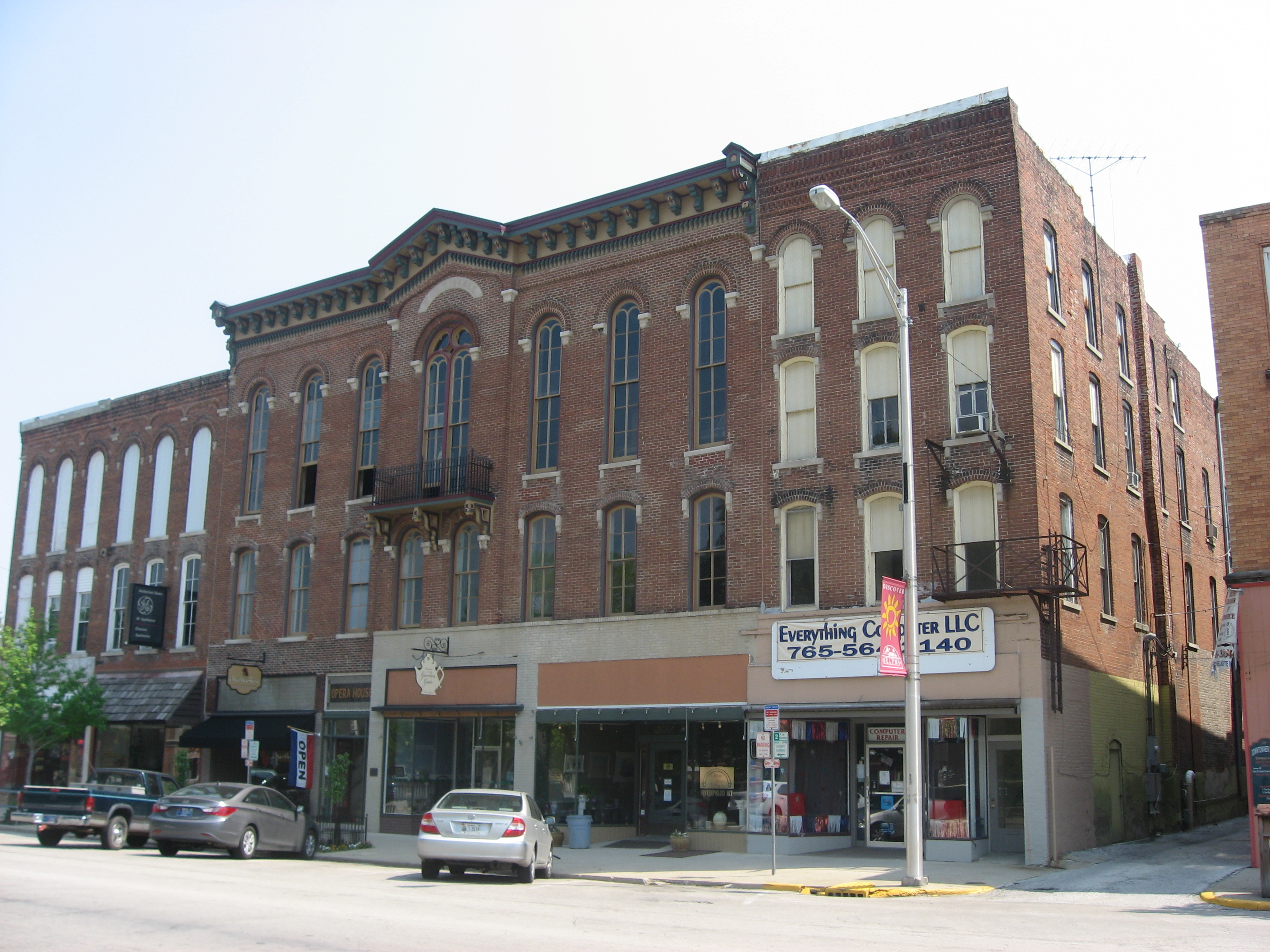
- The Delphi City Hall, a historic place in the township

- Location of Deer Creek Township in Carroll County
- Coordinates: 40°35′15″N 86°37′59″W
- Country: United States
- State: Indiana
- County: Carroll

Government
  - Type: Indiana township

Area
  - Total: 43.94 sq mi (113.8 km^{2})
  - Land: 43.7 sq mi (113 km^{2})
  - Water: 0.24 sq mi (0.62 km^{2})
- Elevation: 627 ft (191 m)

Population (2020)
  - Total: 4,566
  - Density: 104/sq mi (40.3/km^{2})
- FIPS code: 18-17236
- GNIS feature ID: 453257

Deer Creek Township is one of fourteen townships in Carroll County, Indiana. As of the 2020 census, its population was 4,566 (slightly down from 4,571 at 2010) and it contained 1,975 housing units.

== History ==
Deer Creek Township was organized in 1828.

The Baum-Shaeffer Farm, Carrollton Bridge, Deer Creek Valley Rural Historic District, Delphi Lime Kilns, Lock No. 33 Lock Keeper's House, and Wabash and Erie Canal Lock No. 33, Fred and Minnie Raber Farm, Sunset Point, and Wilson Bridge are listed on the National Register of Historic Places.

== Geography ==
According to the 2010 census, the township has a total area of 43.94 square miles (113.8 km^{2}), of which 43.7 square miles (113 km^{2}) (or 99.45%) is land and 0.24 square miles (0.62 km^{2}) (or 0.55%) is water.

=== Cities and towns ===
- Delphi (the county seat)

=== Unincorporated towns ===
- Harley (extinct)

=== Adjacent townships ===
- Adams (north)
- Rock Creek (northeast)
- Jackson (east)
- Monroe (southeast)
- Madison (south)
- Washington Township, Tippecanoe County (southwest)
- Tippecanoe (west)
- Tippecanoe Township, Tippecanoe County (west)

=== Major highways ===
- U.S. Route 421
- Indiana State Road 18
- Indiana State Road 25
- Indiana State Road 218

=== Cemeteries ===
The township contains eight cemeteries: Bostetter, Delphi, Mears, Robinson, Saint Josephs, Sharp Point, Whistler and Wingard.
