= Adams Mills, Michigan =

Coordinates: 41.761831°N 85.044591°W

Adams Mills, Michigan is a populated place in Branch County, Michigan. It was established in 1831 by Wales Adams at the point where the road to Chicago crossed the Prairie River.
