= Cutler, Indiana =

Cutler
- Unincorporated community and Census-designated place
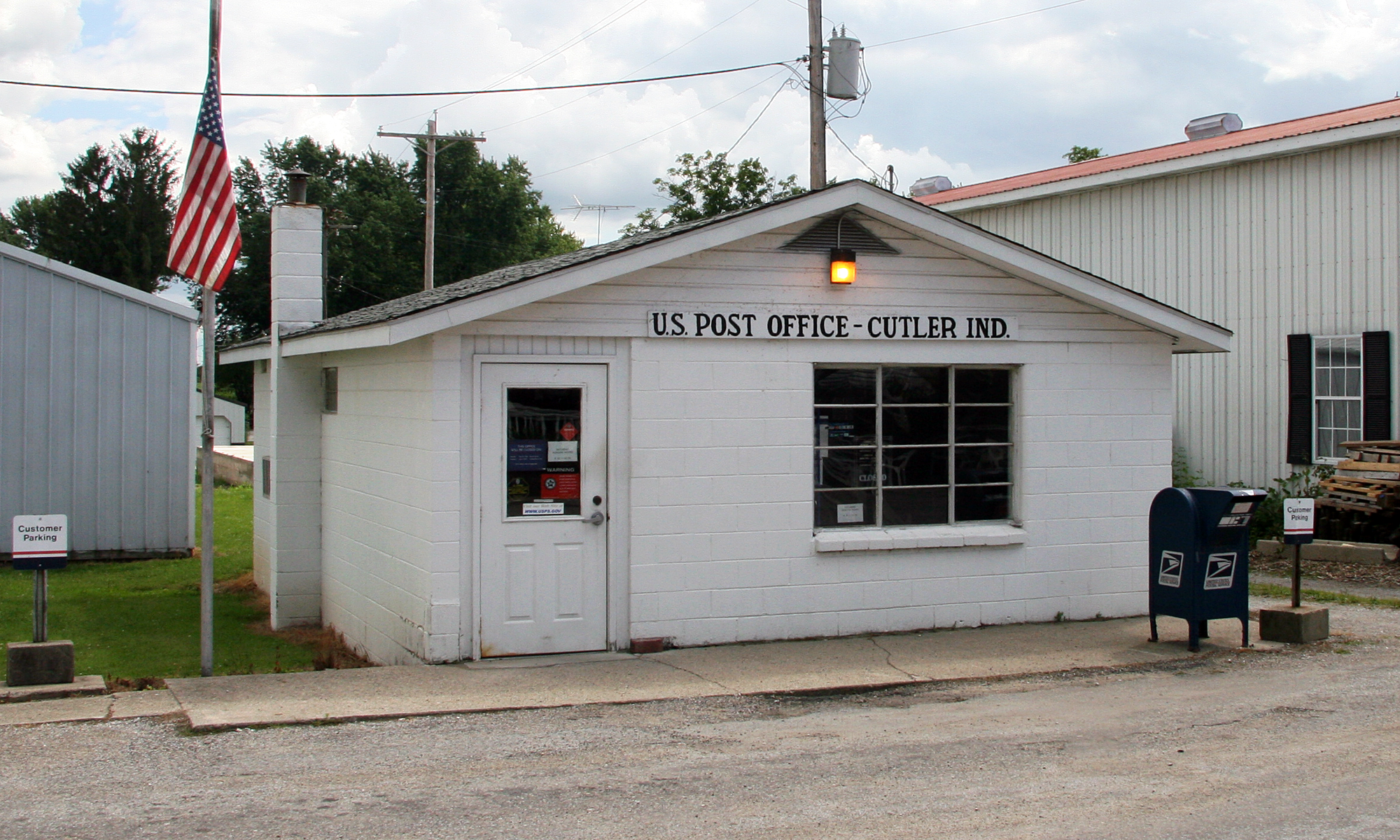
- The post office in Cutler, Indiana

- Carroll County's location in Indiana

- Location in Carroll County
- Coordinates: 40°28′28″N 86°31′31″W
- Country: United States
- State: Indiana
- County: Carroll
- Township: Democrat
- Elevation: 738 ft (225 m)
- ZIP code: 46920
- FIPS code: 18-16480
- GNIS feature ID: 2830324

Cutler is an unincorporated community in Democrat Township, Carroll County, Indiana, United States. It is part of the Lafayette, Indiana Metropolitan Statistical Area.

== History ==
The town was laid out by John A. Cook during the construction of the Logansport Crawfordsville & Southwestern Rail Road sometime in 1871. It was named by him, probably from the man in charge of the construction, William P. Cutler.

The first post office at Cutler was established in 1873.

== Demographics ==
The United States Census Bureau delineated Cutler as a census designated place in the 2022 American Community Survey.

== Education ==
Cutler residents may obtain a library card at the Burlington Community Library in Burlington.

== Notable person ==
- Hugh Lowery, NFL football player, was born in Cutler.
