= Fred and Minnie Raber Farm =

- U.S. National Register of Historic Places
- U.S. Historic district
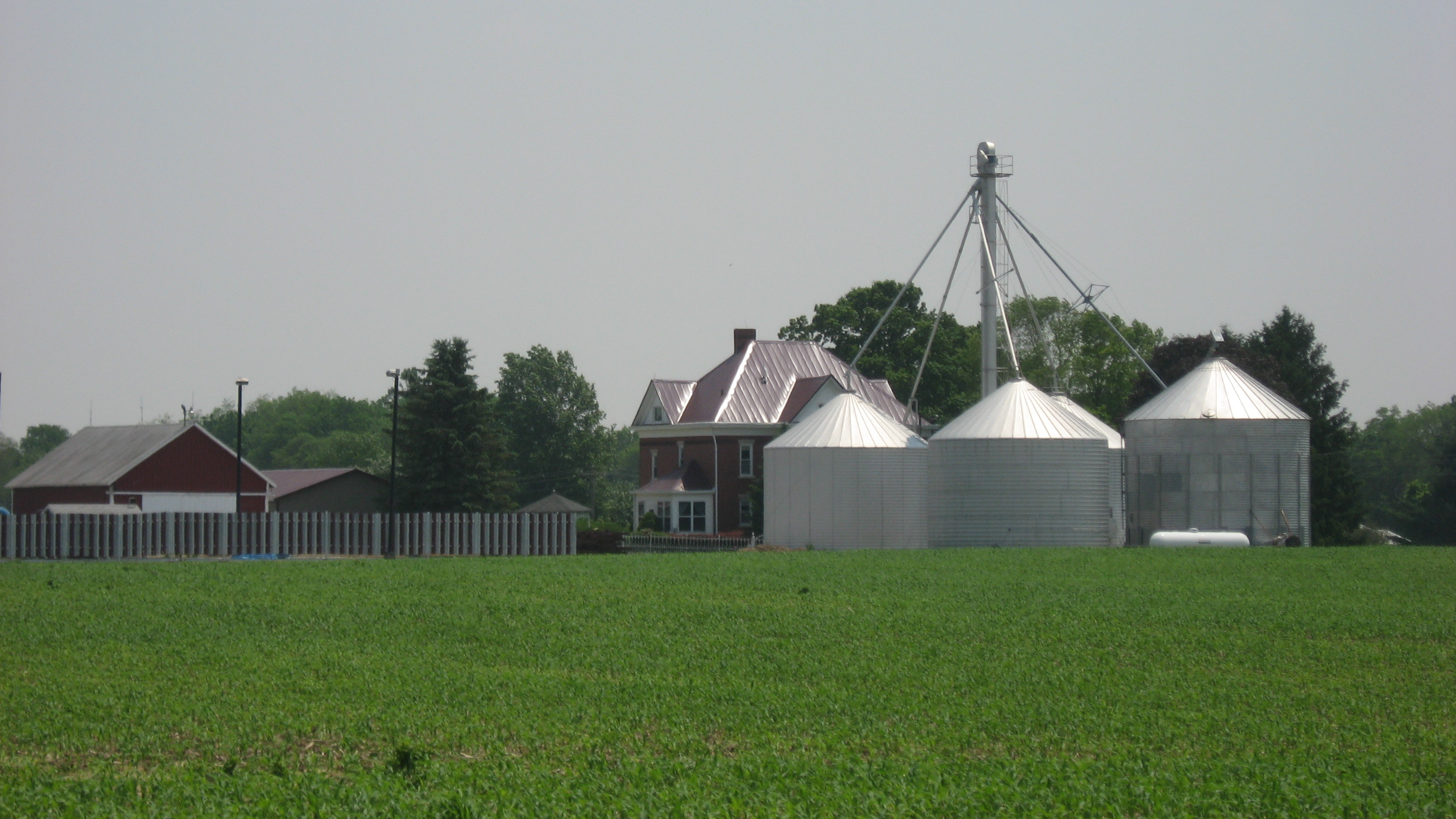
- Fred and Minnie Raber Farm, June 2011

- Location within Carroll County, Indiana Location within Indiana Location within the United States
- Location: Southeastern corner of Sec. 21, most of Sec. 22, and areas north of Deer Creek, east of Delphi, Deer Creek Township, Carroll County, Indiana
- Coordinates: 40°36′21″N 86°36′11″W
- Area: 5 acres (2.0 ha)
- Built: 1905
- Built by: Holsinger, George
- Architectural style: Late 19th And 20th Century Revivals, Free Classic
- NRHP reference No.: 92001169
- Added to NRHP: September 16, 1992

Fred and Minnie Raber Farm, also known as the Raber-Hasselbring-Shaffer Farm and Raber-Robbins Farm, is a historic home and farm and national historic district located in Deer Creek Township, Carroll County, Indiana. The house was built in 1904–1905, and is a large 2 1/2-story, brick veneer frame dwelling with elements of Queen Anne and Colonial Revival style design. It has a steeply pitched hip roof, one-story verandah, and paired Tuscan order columns. Also on the property are the contributing gazebo, garage, chicken house, corn crib, scales site, iron fence, and barn.

It was listed on the National Register of Historic Places in 1992.
