= Lockport, Indiana =

Lockport
- Unincorporated community
- Carroll County's location in Indiana

- Location in Carroll County
- Coordinates: 40°41′57″N 86°34′25″W
- Country: United States
- State: Indiana
- County: Carroll
- Township: Adams
- Elevation: 571 ft (174 m)
- ZIP code: 47926
- FIPS code: 18-44550
- GNIS feature ID: 438202

Lockport is an unincorporated community in Adams Township, Carroll County, Indiana. It is part of the Lafayette, Indiana Metropolitan Statistical Area.

== History ==
A post office was established at Lockport in 1838, and remained in operation until it was discontinued in 1904. The birth of the town, and its name, are related to the set of lock gates that one would have encountered on the Wabash and Erie Canal.

== Geography ==
Lockport is located less than half a mile northwest of the Wabash River. Burnetts Creek flows along the east side of town.
