= Wabash and Erie Canal Culvert No. 100 =

- Wabash and Erie Canal Culvert #100
- U.S. National Register of Historic Places
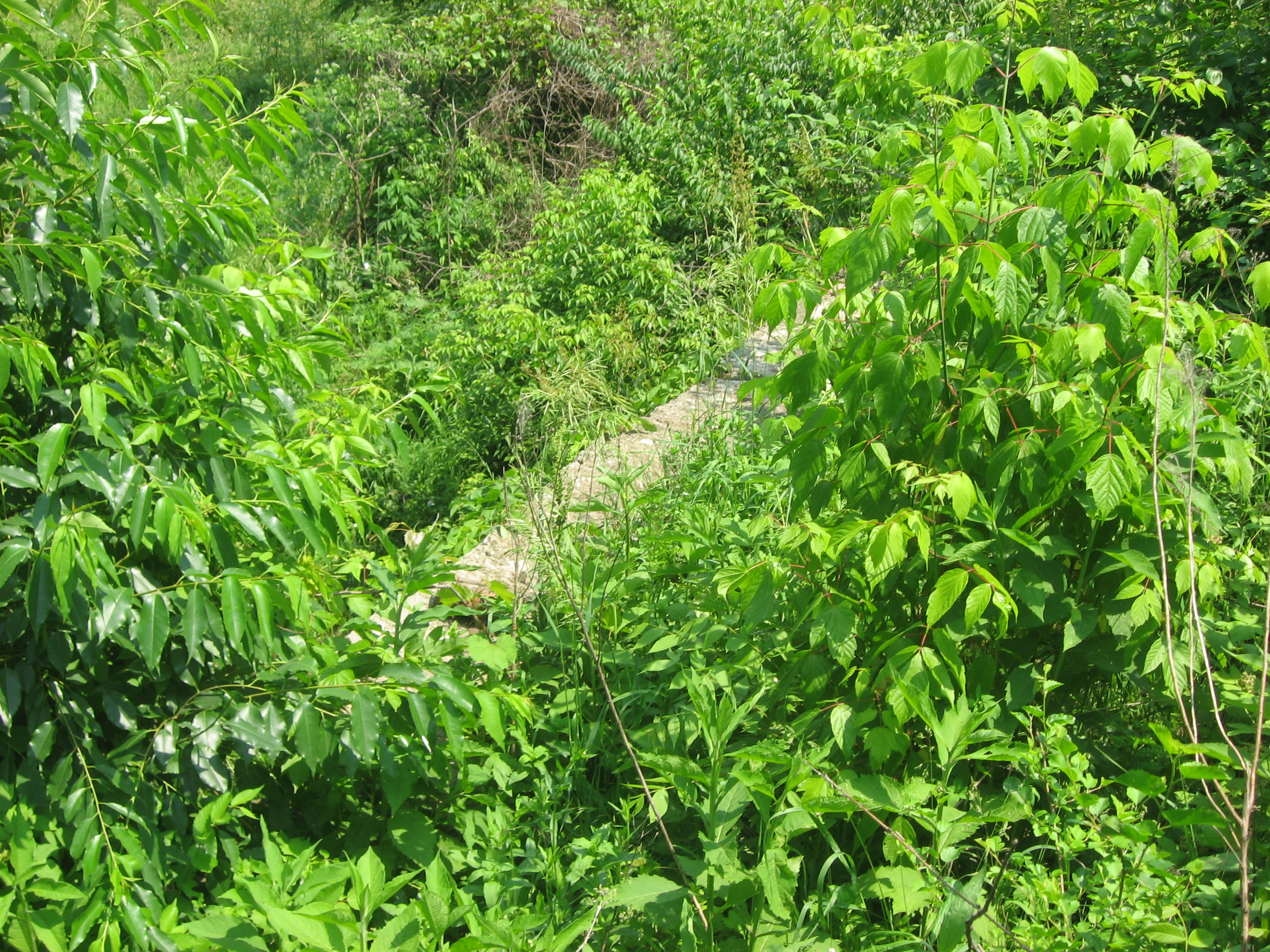
- Edge of the Burnett's Creek Arch, June 2011

- Location within Carroll County, Indiana Location within Indiana Location within the United States
- Location: Towpath Rd. at Lockport, Adams Township, Carroll County, Indiana
- Coordinates: 40°42′11″N 86°34′2″W
- Area: 0.1 acres (0.040 ha)
- Built: 1840
- Built by: Case, Reed
- Architectural style: masonry arch
- NRHP reference No.: 02000194
- Added to NRHP: March 20, 2002

Wabash and Erie Canal Culvert #100, also known as Burnett's Creek Arch and County Bridge #181, is a historic culvert built for the Wabash and Erie Canal and located at Adams Township, Carroll County, Indiana. It was built in 1840, and is a semicircular span measuring 20 feet long, 10 feet high, and 87 feet, 6 inches wide. It is constructed of limestone slabs. The culvert now supports a county roadway.

It was listed on the National Register of Historic Places in 2002.
