= Baum–Shaeffer Farm =

- U.S. National Register of Historic Places
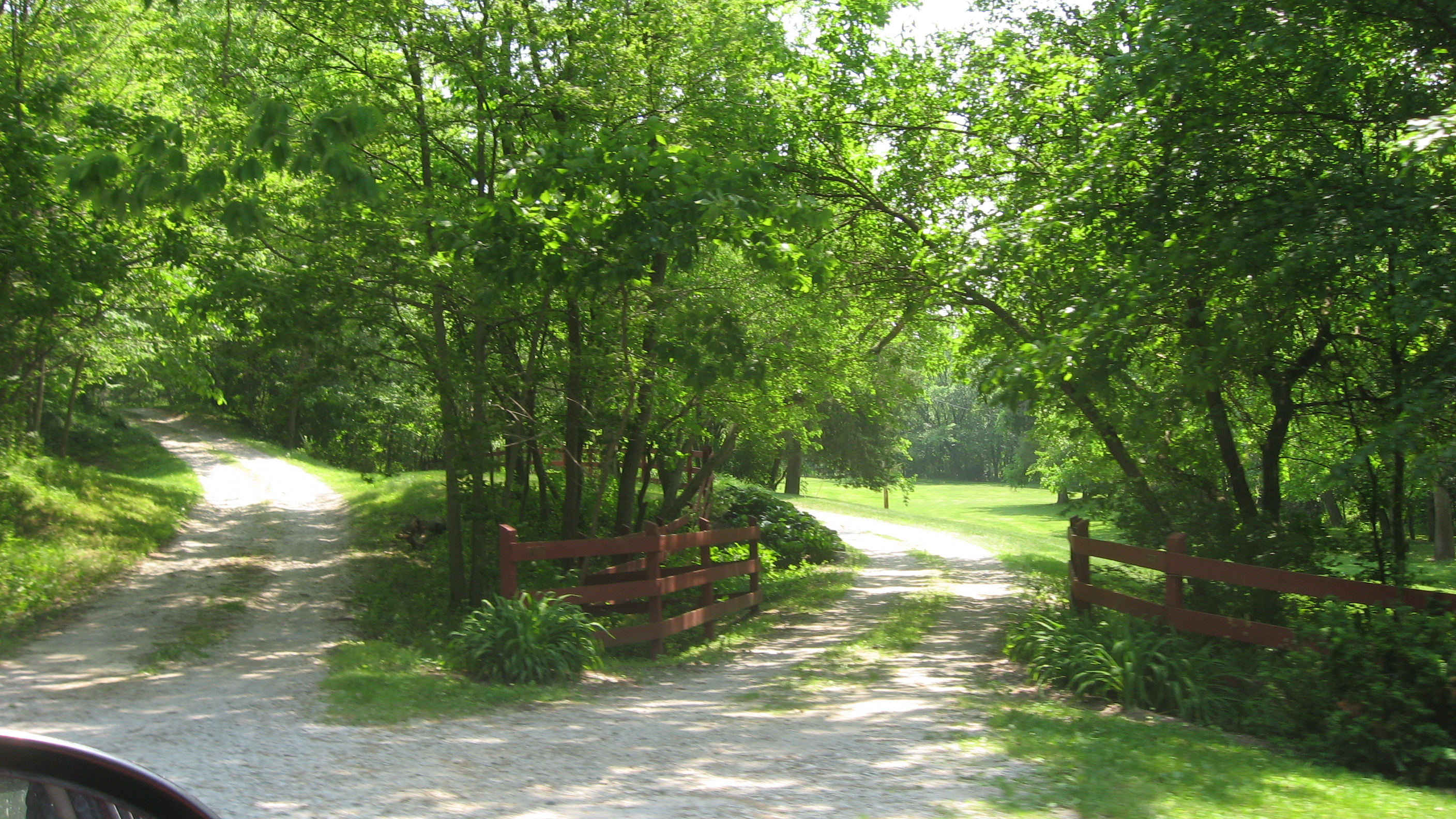
- Baum–Shaeffer Farm driveway, June 2011

- Location within Carroll County, Indiana Location within Indiana Location within the United States
- Location: Southeastern corner of Sec. 21, most of Sec. 22, and areas north of Deer Creek, east of Delphi, Deer Creek Township, Carroll County, Indiana
- Coordinates: 40°34′28″N 86°39′11″W
- Area: 5 acres (2.0 ha)
- Built: c. 1830, c. 1855
- Built by: Baum, David
- Architectural style: Italianate, bank barn
- NRHP reference No.: 98001102
- Added to NRHP: August 28, 1998

Baum–Shaeffer Farm is a historic home and farm located in Deer Creek Township, Carroll County, Indiana. The house was built about 1855, and is a two-story, cross-plan, Italianate style brick dwelling. It sits on a rubble limestone foundation and measures 40 feet wide and 60 feet long. Also on the property are the contributing wooden hay barn (c. 1850), wooden granary (c. 1900), log smokehouse (1830s), brick summer kitchen (c. 1850), and wooden sheep barn (c. 1900).

It was listed on the National Register of Historic Places in 1998.
