= McIntyre-Burri House =

Historic house in Missouri, United States

- U.S. National Register of Historic Places
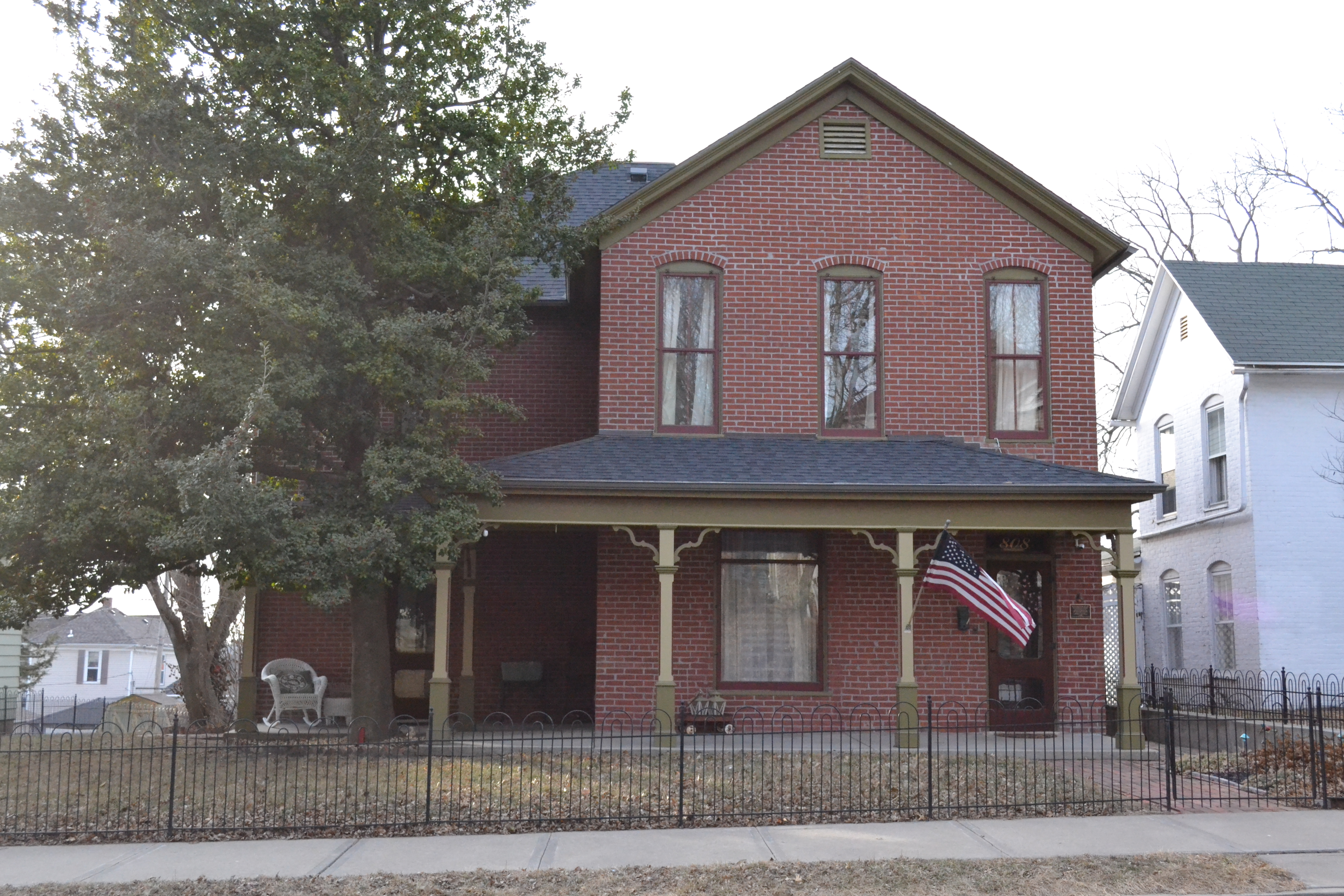

- Location within Missouri Location within the United States
- Location: 808 N. 24th St., Saint Joseph, Missouri
- Coordinates: 39°46′35″N 94°49′54″W
- Area: less than one acre
- Built: c. 1870, 1907
- Architectural style: Italianate
- MPS: St. Joseph MPS
- NRHP reference No.: 05001435
- Added to NRHP: December 23, 2005

McIntyre-Burri House is a historic home in St. Joseph, Missouri. It was built about 1870, and is a two-story, Italianate style brick dwelling. A rear frame addition was constructed in 1907, when the house was converted to a duplex. It has a low pitched cross-gable roof, segmental arched openings, and a full-width front porch with Tuscan order columns.

It was listed on the National Register of Historic Places in 2005.
