= Burris House and Potawatomi Spring =

Historic house in Indiana, United States

- U.S. National Register of Historic Places
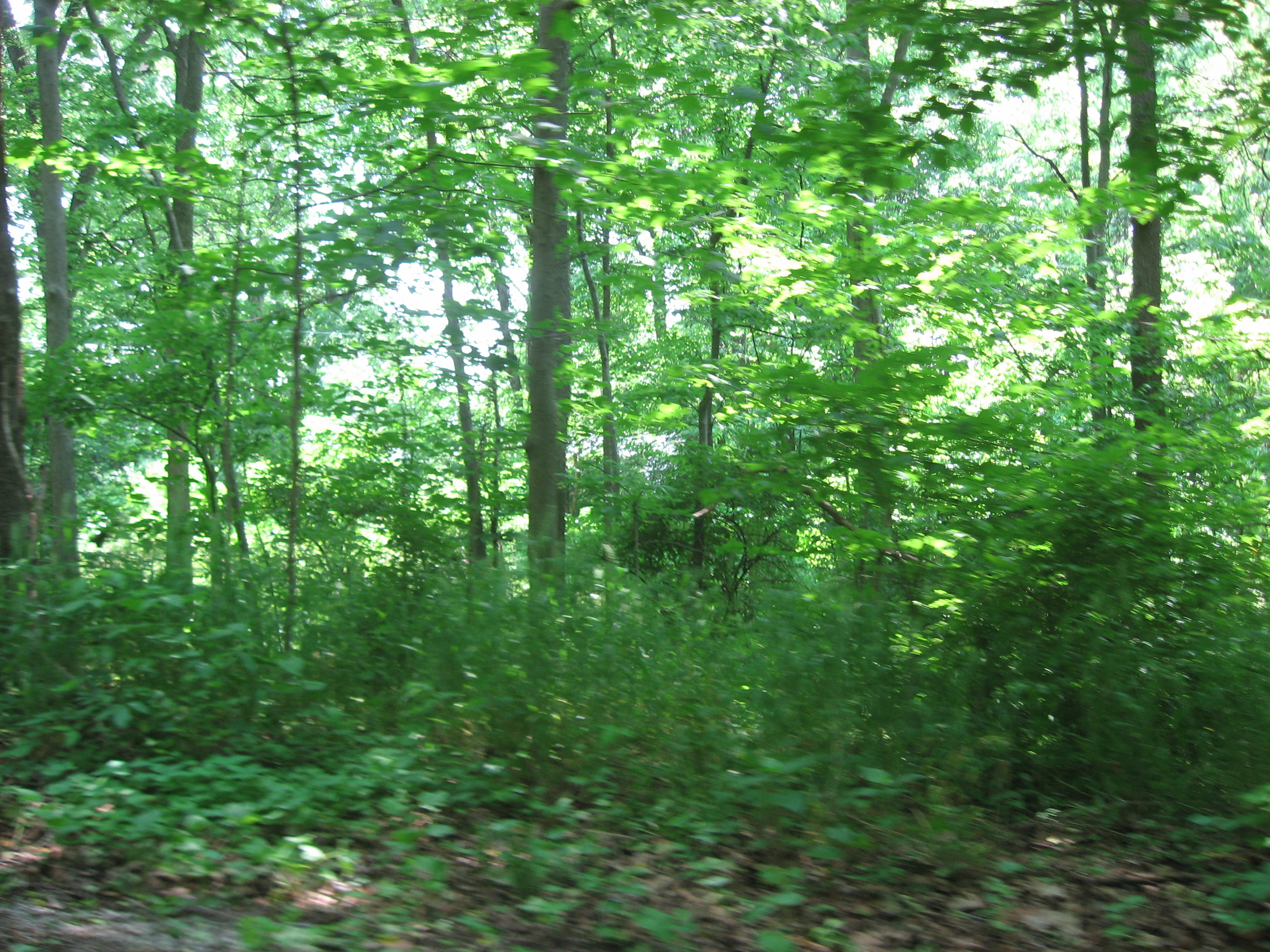
- Site of the Burris House at Lockport, June 2011

- Location within Carroll County, Indiana Location within Indiana Location within the United States
- Location: Towpath Rd. at Lockport, Adams Township, Carroll County, Indiana
- Coordinates: 40°41′54″N 86°34′28″W
- Area: 2 acres (0.81 ha)
- Built: c. 1838-1840
- NRHP reference No.: 77000018
- Added to NRHP: September 15, 1977

Burris House and Potawatomi Spring was a historic home located at Adams Township, Carroll County, Indiana. The house was built between 1838 and 1840, and is a simple two-story, frame dwelling sheathed in clapboard. It sat on a limestone foundation and measured 31 feet wide and 45 feet long. It was cut into the Wabash and Erie Canal embankment and served as an inn, post office, and merchandise warehouse. The Potawatomi Spring is located nearby and was used by Native American and early settlers. The spring was a source of water for Lockport until about 1940. The house has been demolished.

It was listed on the National Register of Historic Places in 1977.
