= Sycamore Row (road) =

Coordinates: 40°36′24.7″N 86°23′28.6″W

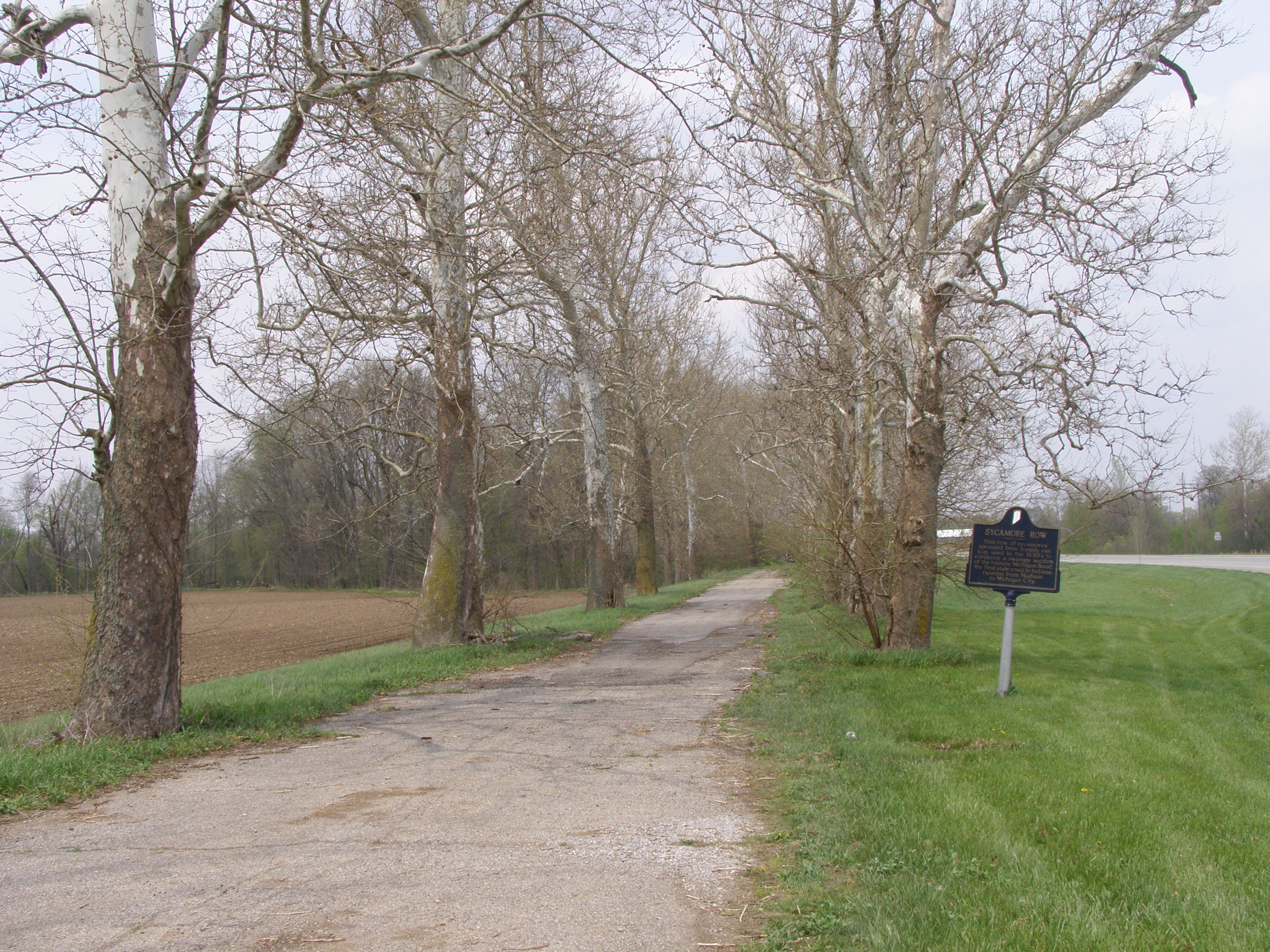
Sycamore Row along the old Michigan Road, leading north to its crossing of Deer Creek, in Carroll County, Indiana.

Sycamore Row is a stretch of road in Carroll County, Indiana lined with sycamore trees. The trees sprouted from sycamore logs placed in the 1830s as a corduroy road to cross swampy land on Indiana State Road 29. The site is noted by the Indiana Historical Bureau with a historical marker. Currently State Road 29 bypasses Sycamore Row and regular traffic does not travel over the road. The road section was listed on the National Register of Historic Places in 2023.

== History ==
By 1837, the Michigan Road had reached Logansport. The roadway consisted of leveled dirt and log bridges, which decayed with every rain and snow fall. By 1850 the state approved funding to have the road planked. The roadbed was leveled and then covered with a wooden structure. Planking consisted of log sills or sleepers, laid lengthwise along the outer edges. Crosswise, planks were nailed to the sleepers. The planks were 2 or 3 inches (5.1 or 7.6 cm) thick. Each sleeper run could be up to 10 feet (3.0 m) in length. When necessary, multiple sleeper sections were linked end to end. Together, these planks provided a road free of dust and mud. With age, mud holes formed under the planks and sprayed outwards and up between the planks, making some sections of roadway impassible during the muddy season.

Because of the initial construction and continued maintenance expenses, plank roads became toll roads or pikes. There was a toll booth at the south end of Sycamore Row in Deer Creek.

== Authenticity questioned ==
While the Michigan Road is known to have been routed along what is now Sycamore Row, the explanation for why the road is now lined with sycamores has not been confirmed. The text of the historical marker has been under review since 2010.
