= Adams Mill =

- U.S. National Register of Historic Places
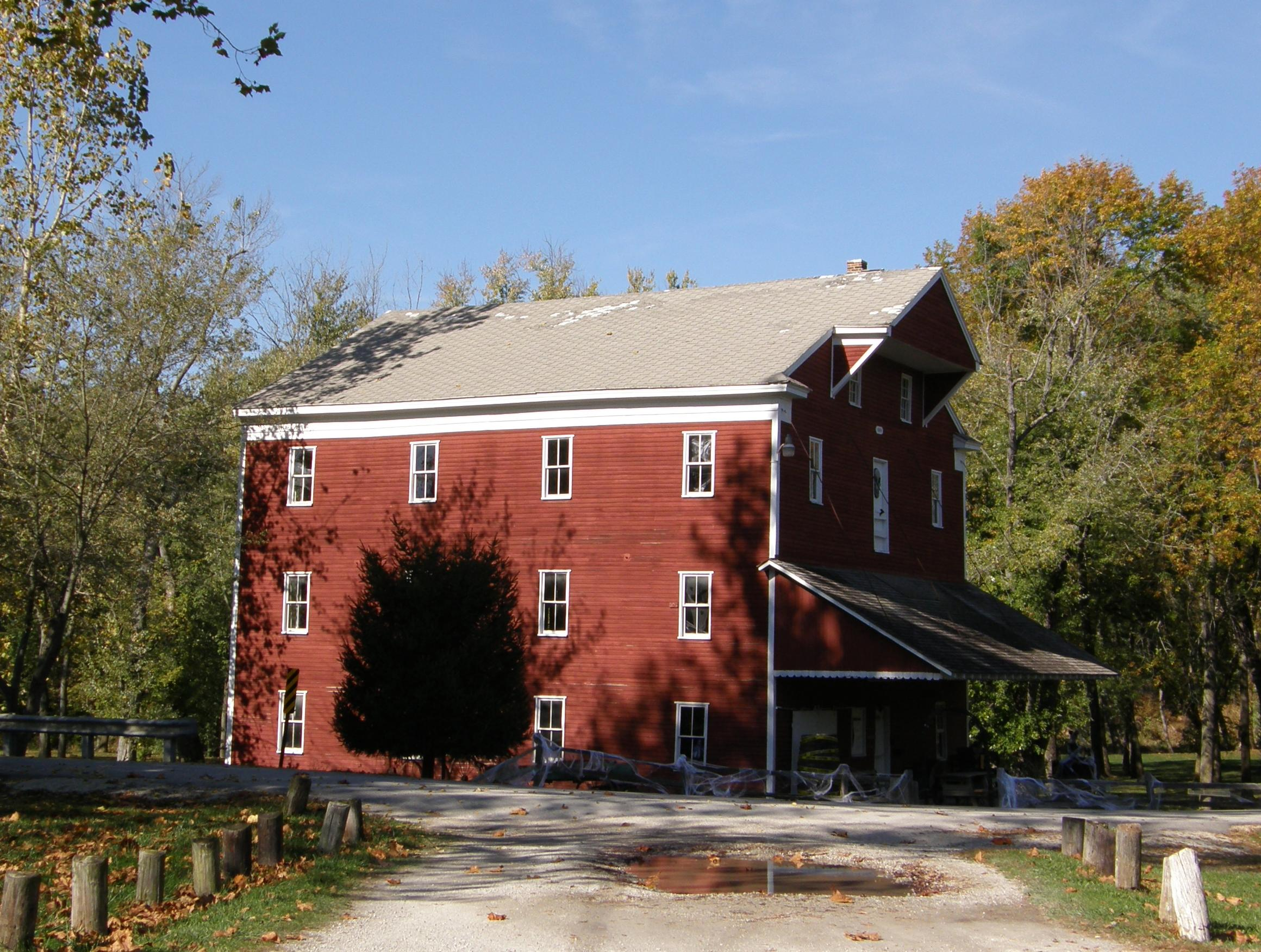
- Adams Mill, October 1988

- Location within Carroll County, Indiana Location within Indiana Location within the United States
- Location: Off County Road 50E, northeast of Cutler, Democrat Township, Carroll County, Indiana
- Coordinates: 40°28′50″N 86°30′29″W
- Area: 1.3 acres (0.53 ha)
- Built: 1845-1846
- NRHP reference No.: 84000278
- Added to NRHP: November 23, 1984

Adams Mill is a historic grist mill located at Democrat Township, Carroll County, Indiana, United States. It was built in 1845–1846, and is a 3 1/2-story, rectangular frame building. It measures approximately 45 feet by 50 feet, has a gable roof, and rests on a cut stone pier foundation. It remained in commercial operation until 1952. It is open to the public.

It was listed on the National Register of Historic Places in 1984.
