= National Register of Historic Places listings in Clinton County, Indiana =

Location of Clinton County in Indiana

This is intended to be a complete list of the properties and districts on the National Register of Historic Places in Clinton County, Indiana, United States. Latitude and longitude coordinates are provided for many National Register properties and districts; these locations may be seen together in a map.

There are 12 properties and districts listed on the National Register in the county, and one former listing.

Properties and districts located in incorporated areas display the name of the municipality, while properties and districts in unincorporated areas display the name of their civil township. Properties and districts split between multiple jurisdictions display the names of all jurisdictions.

This National Park Service list is complete through NPS recent listings posted October 30, 2026.

== Current listings ==
| | Name on the Register | Image | Date listed | Location | City or town | Description |
|---|---|---|---|---|---|---|
| 1 | Christian Ridge Historic District | Christian Ridge Historic District | June 22, 2003 (#03000540) | Roughly bounded by Prairie Creek, Young and E. Washington Sts., and Harvard Terr. 40°16′43″N 86°30′21″W | Frankfort | |
| 2 | Clinton County Courthouse | Clinton County Courthouse | December 5, 1978 (#78000027) | Public Square; 40°16′52″N 86°30′40″W | Frankfort | |
| 3 | Colfax Carnegie Library | Colfax Carnegie Library | March 17, 1994 (#94000230) | 207 S. Clark St. 40°11′36″N 86°39′59″W | Colfax | |
| 4 | Charles H. and Emma Condon House | Charles H. and Emma Condon House | January 2, 1997 (#96001545) | 603 S. Jackson St. 40°16′33″N 86°30′36″W | Frankfort | |
| 5 | Frankfort Commercial Historic District | Frankfort Commercial Historic District | August 14, 1998 (#98001055) | Roughly bounded by Walnut, Columbia, and Morrison Sts. and Prairie Creek; 40°16′54″N 86°30′42″W | Frankfort | |
| 6 | Kirklin Public Library | Kirklin Public Library | March 3, 1995 (#95000206) | 115 N. Main St. 40°11′36″N 86°21′37″W | Kirklin | |
| 7 | Old Frankfort Stone High School | Old Frankfort Stone High School | June 4, 1979 (#79000012) | 301 E. Clinton; 40°16′48″N 86°30′32″W | Frankfort | |
| 8 | Parkview Home of Clinton County | Parkview Home of Clinton County | December 3, 2018 (#100003179) | 1501 Burlington Ave. 40°17′42″N 86°30′05″W | Center Township | |
| 9 | Rosenberger Building | Rosenberger Building | May 3, 1984 (#84001004) | 83 Old Main St. 40°11′25″N 86°39′49″W | Colfax | |
| 10 | South Frankfort Historic District | South Frankfort Historic District | June 17, 2009 (#09000422) | Roughly between Walnut St., Prairie Creek, and Meredith and Columbia Sts. 40°16′35″N 86°30′40″W | Frankfort | |
| 11 | TPA Park | TPA Park | August 28, 2019 (#100004364) | 1 Adrian Marks Dr. 40°17′35″N 86°30′16″W | Frankfort | |
| 12 | John Young House | John Young House | November 25, 1994 (#94001348) | 9665 N. County Road 250E, northeast of Geetingsville; 40°25′36″N 86°27′31″W | Warren Township | |

== Former listings ==
| | Name on the Register | Image | Date listed | Date removed | Location | City or town | Description |
|---|---|---|---|---|---|---|---|
| 1 | Scotland Bridge | Scotland Bridge | March 17, 1994 (#94000228) | March 5, 2024 | Lost Rd. (County Road 400E) over Sugar Creek, northeast of Mechanicsburg; 40°10′36″N 86°25′54″W | Jackson and Harrison Townships | Extends into Boone County |

== See also ==
- List of National Historic Landmarks in Indiana
- National Register of Historic Places listings in Indiana
- Listings in neighboring counties: Boone, Carroll, Hamilton, Howard, Montgomery, Tipton, Tippecanoe
