= List of Carnegie libraries in Indiana =

The following list of Carnegie libraries in Indiana provides detailed information on United States Carnegie libraries in Indiana, where 164 public libraries were built from 156 grants (totaling $2,508,664) awarded by the Carnegie Corporation of New York from 1901 to 1918. In addition, academic libraries were built at 2 institutions (totaling $80,000).

== Key ==
Building still operating as a library
Building standing, but now serving another purpose
Building no longer standing
Building listed on the National Register of Historic Places
Building contributes to a historic district on the National Register of Historic Places

== Public libraries ==
	Library	City or town	Image	Date granted	Grant amount	Location	Notes
1	Akron	Akron		May 13, 1913	$12,500	205 E. Rochester St.	Has an addition and is still used as the public library. (April 2011)
2	Albion	Albion		Jan 28, 1916	$10,000	109 N. York St.	Open 1918–1995, demolished 2021?
3	Alexandria	Alexandria		Apr 26, 1902	$14,000	117 E. Church St.	Opened 1903
4	Anderson	Anderson		Apr 11, 1902	$50,000	32 W. 10th St.	Open 1905–1987, now an art museum
5	Angola	Angola		Mar 27, 1909	$10,000	322 S. Wayne St.	
6	Atlanta	Atlanta		May 15, 1916	$10,000	100 S. Walnut St.	
7	Attica	Attica		Jan 13, 1903	$10,000	305 S. Perry St.	Opened in 1904 and an addition was added in 1995.
8	Bedford	Bedford		Jan 9, 1902	$20,000	1323 K St.	
9	Bloomfield	Bloomfield		Jul 22, 1908	$12,000	125 S. Franklin St.	
10	Bloomington	Bloomington		Oct 21, 1901	$31,000	200 E. 6th St.	Now a museum
11	Bluffton	Bluffton		Jan 13, 1903	$13,000	223 W. Washington St. 40.738929°N 85.173563°W	Open 1905–1991, now a county government annex
12	Boonville	Boonville		Nov 3, 1913	$12,000	121 E. Locust St.	Now a police station
13	Boswell	Boswell		Nov 30, 1910	$8,000	101 E. Main St. 40.518503°N 87.381569°W	Has an addition and is still used as the public library. (April 2011)
14	Brazil	Brazil		Mar 14, 1902	$20,000	204 N. Walnut St.	
15	Brook	Brook		May 21, 1913	$7,000	100 W. Main St. 40.865895°N 87.363828°W	Has an addition and is still used as the public library. (April 2011)
16	Brookston	Brookston		Sep 29, 1915	$10,000	111 W. 2nd St. 40.603437°N 86.868274°W	Has an addition and is still used as the public library. (April 2011)
17	Brookville	Brookville		Nov 30, 1910	$10,000	919 Main St.	
18	Brownsburg	Brownsburg		Apr 3, 1912	$12,500	104 E. Main St.	Now houses the Hendricks County Solid Waste Management District office.
19	Butler	Butler		Dec 8, 1913	$10,000	201 E. Main St.	Used by the DeKalb County Historical Society. (May 2011)
20	Carlisle	Carlisle		Feb 6, 1915	$10,000		Burned down in 1965
21	Carmel	Carmel		Mar 14, 1913	$11,000	40 E. Main St.	Open 1914–1971, now a restaurant
22	Clinton	Clinton		Feb 25, 1908	$12,500	313 S. 4th St.	
23	Coatesville	Coatesville		Apr 13, 1914	$8,000		Open 1916–1948, destroyed by a tornado
24	Colfax	Colfax		Sep 29, 1915	$9,000	207 S. Clark St.	Still used as the public library. (April 2011)
25	Columbus	Columbus		Dec 30, 1901	$15,000		Demolished 1970
26	Connersville	Connersville		Dec 13, 1907	$20,000		
27	Converse	Converse		Nov 9, 1916	$9,000	100 S. Jefferson St.	Has an addition and is still used as the public library. (April 2011)
28	Corydon	Corydon		Sep 27, 1912	$7,500	117 W. Beaver St.	Open 1914–1998
29	Covington	Covington		Mar 14, 1913	$10,000	622 S. 5th St.	
30	Crawfordsville	Crawfordsville		Mar 8, 1901	$25,000	222 S. Washington St.	Now the Carnegie Museum of Montgomery County.
31	Crown Point	Crown Point		Feb 28, 1906	$12,000	223 S. Main St.	Open 1908–1974 Is now used as offices for Crown Point Community Library system.
32	Culver	Culver		Jan 6, 1915	$10,000	107 N. Main St.	Opened 1915
33	Danville	Danville		Mar 14, 1902	$10,000	101 S. Indiana St.	Major renovation in 1999 keeping with original architectural design. Under renovation in 2016.
34	Darlington	Darlington		Feb 6, 1915	$10,000	203 W. Main St.	
35	Decatur	Decatur		Mar 8, 1904	$12,000	122 S. 3rd St.	Opened 1906, now county court office
36	Delphi	Delphi		Dec 30, 1904	$10,000	222 E. Main St.	
37	Earl Park	Earl Park		Nov 21, 1911	$7,500	102 E. 5th St.	Has an addition and is still used as the public library. (April 2011)
38	East Chicago Baring Avenue Branch	East Chicago		Jan 13, 1903	$40,000	1008 W. Chicago Ave.	
39	East Chicago Indiana Harbor Branch	East Chicago		Jan 13, 1903	$20,000	3605 Grand Ave.	Now the East Chicago Academy of Visual and Performing Arts. (March 2015)
40	Elkhart	Elkhart		Mar 6, 1901	$35,000		Open 1903–1969, demolished 1970
41	Elwood	Elwood		Oct 3, 1901	$30,000	124 N. 16th St.	Open 1903–1997
42	Evansville East Branch	Evansville		Jan 6, 1911	$60,000	840 E. Chandler Ave. in the Bayard Park Neighborhood	Opened 1913
43	Evansville West Branch	Evansville		Jan 6, 1911	—	2000 W. Franklin St.	Opened 1913
44	Evansville Cherry Branch	Evansville		Jan 6, 1911	—	515 Cherry St.	Colored branch during segregation, open 1914–1955, demolished c.1970
45	Flora	Flora		Feb 3, 1917	$10,000	109 N. Center St.	Still used as a public library.
46	Fort Branch	Fort Branch		May 15, 1916	$10,000	107 E. Locust St.	
47	Fort Wayne	Fort Wayne		Mar 14, 1901	$90,000	900 Library Plz.	Demolished 1968
48	Fortville	Fortville		Mar 31, 1916	$10,000	115 N. Main St.	Open 1918–1986, now a church youth center
49	Fowler	Fowler		Apr 11, 1906	$7,500	102 N. Van Buren Ave.	Has an addition and is still used as the public library. (April 2011)
50	Francesville	Francesville		Apr 19, 1915	$9,000	201 W. Montgomery St.	Has an addition and is still used as the public library. (April 2011)
51	Frankfort	Frankfort		Nov 24, 1905	$22,500	208 W. Clinton St.	
52	Franklin	Franklin		Apr 28, 1913	$17,500	196 E. Madison St.	Converted into condos in 1990s
53	Garrett	Garrett		Mar 14, 1913	$10,000	107 W. Houston St.	
54	Gary Central Branch	Gary		Apr 28, 1910	$90,000		Open 1912–1962
55	Gary Bailey Branch	Gary		Apr 28, 1910	$25,000	1501 W. Madison St.	Opened 1918, the only Colonial Revival-style Carnegie library in Indiana. Demolished.
56	Gas City	Gas City		Jan 2, 1913	$12,500	135 E. Main St.	Has an addition and is still used as the public library. (February 2011)
57	Goshen	Goshen		Jan 15, 1901	$25,000	202 N. 5th St.	Open 1903–1968, now city hall
58	Grandview	Grandview		Sep 14, 1917	$8,000	403 Main St.	
59	Greencastle	Greencastle		Jan 22, 1902	$20,165	103 E. Poplar St.	
60	Greenfield	Greenfield		Mar 8, 1904	$10,000	100 W. North St.	Now a restaurant
61	Greensburg	Greensburg		Mar 14, 1902	$15,000	114 N. Michigan Ave.	Now a private residence.
62	Hammond	Hammond		Jan 14, 1904	$27,000		
63	Hartford City	Hartford City		Jan 22, 1902	$16,000	314 N. High St.	Has an addition and is still used as the public library. (February 2011)
64	Hebron	Hebron		Sep 14, 1917	$10,000	201 W. Sigler St.	Has an addition and is still used as the public library. (July 2010)
65	Hobart	Hobart		Jan 14, 1914	$16,000	706 E. 4th St.	Open 1915–1968, the only Tudor Revival building in Hobart, now used by the Hobart Historical Society as a museum of local history. (July 2010)
66	Huntington	Huntington	Former Carnegie library building in Huntington, Indiana July 2025	Dec 21, 1901	$25,000	44 E. Park Dr.	Now houses a comic book and game store.
67	Indianapolis West Indianapolis Branch	Indianapolis		Jan 19, 1909	$100,000	1926 W. Morris St.	Open 1912–1986, demolished 1994
68	Indianapolis Madison Avenue Branch	Indianapolis		Jan 19, 1909	—	1034 S. Alabama St.	Demolished 1968 to make way for I-70
69	Indianapolis Spades Park Branch	Indianapolis		Jan 19, 1909	—	1801 Nowland Ave.	Opened 1912
70	Indianapolis East Washington Branch	Indianapolis		Jan 19, 1909	—	2822 E. Washington St.	Opened 1911
71	Indianapolis Hawthorne Branch	Indianapolis		Jan 19, 1909	—	70 N. Mount St.	Now a community services center
72	Jeffersonville	Jeffersonville		Feb 15, 1902	$16,000	Warder Park	Open 1903–1970
73	Kendallville	Kendallville		Jul 13, 1912	$12,500	124 E. Rush St.	
74	Kentland	Kentland		Dec 2, 1909	$10,000	201 E. Graham St.	Has an addition and is still used as the public library. (April 2011)
75	Kewanna	Kewanna		May 21, 1913	$8,000	210 E. Main St.	
76	Kingman	Kingman		Jul 9, 1913	$8,000	123 W. State St.	
77	Kirklin	Kirklin		May 8, 1914	$7,500	115 N. Main St.	
78	Knightstown	Knightstown		Apr 25, 1911	$10,000	5 E. Main St.	Opened 1912
79	Kokomo	Kokomo		Mar 14, 1902	$25,000		Demolished 1965
80	LaGrange	LaGrange		Nov 9, 1916	$12,500	203 W. Spring St.	Has an addition and is still used as the public library. (October 2010)
81	La Porte	La Porte		Mar 31, 1916	$27,500	904 Indiana Ave.	Has an addition and is still used as the public library. (July 2025)
82	Lawrenceburg	Lawrenceburg		Apr 13, 1914	$11,000	150 Mary St.	
83	Lebanon	Lebanon		Jan 6, 1903	$15,000	104 E. Washington St.	
84	Liberty	Liberty		Jan 6, 1915	$10,000	2 E. Seminary St.	
85	Ligonier	Ligonier		Apr 8, 1907	$10,000	300 S. Main St.	Renovations were done in 2013 by Kelty Tappy Design, Inc. in Fort Wayne, IN.
86	Linden	Linden		Jan 28, 1916	$7,500	102 S. Main St.	Opened 1922
87	Linton	Linton		Dec 24, 1907	$15,000	110 E. Vincennes St.	Now the Carnegie Heritage & Arts Center
88	Logansport	Logansport		Apr 26, 1902	$35,000		Burned down in 1941
89	Lowell	Lowell		Mar 11, 1918	$12,500	512 E. Commercial Ave.	Open 1920–1969 Is now a martial arts studio (2023).
90	Marion	Marion		Feb 18, 1901	$50,000	600 S. Washington St.	Has an addition and is still used as the public library. (February 2011)
91	Martinsville	Martinsville		Feb 13, 1906	$12,500	110 S. Jefferson St.	Has an addition and is still used as the public library (November 2018)
92	Merom	Merom		Nov 9, 1916	$10,000	8554 W. Market St.	
93	Milford	Milford		Dec 3, 1915	$10,000	101 N. Main St.	
94	Mishawaka	Mishawaka		Jan 6, 1915	$30,000	122 N. Hill St.	Now an event venue
95	Mitchell	Mitchell		May 8, 1914	$15,000	804 W. Main St.	
96	Monon	Monon		Dec 8, 1913	$10,000	427 N. Market St.	Has an addition and is still used as the public library. (April 2011)
97	Monterey	Monterey		Apr 3, 1917	$5,000	6260 E. Main St.	
98	Monticello	Monticello		Jan 16, 1906	$10,000	101 S. Bluff St.	Now county historical society
99	Montpelier	Montpelier		Feb 21, 1907	$10,000	301 S. Main St.	Has an addition and is still used as the public library. (February 2011)
100	Mooresville	Mooresville		Jan 2, 1913	$10,000	30 W. Main St.	
101	Mount Vernon	Mount Vernon		Dec 27, 1902	$14,000	520 Main St.	Currently functions as Mount Vernon City Hall. A new library building was built across the street in 1986
102	Muncie	Muncie		Mar 8, 1901	$55,000	301 E. Jackson St.	Currently functions as the genealogy center for Muncie Public Library.
103	New Albany	New Albany		Mar 14, 1902	$40,000	201 E. Spring St.	The building has been converted to the Carnegie Center for Art & History.
104	New Carlisle	New Carlisle		Sep 14, 1917	$9,000	124 E. Michigan St.	Currently houses town offices
105	New Castle	New Castle		Jul 9, 1913	$20,000	376 S. 15th St.	
106	Newburgh	Newburgh		May 15, 1916	$10,000	23 W. Jennings St.	Now city hall
107	Noblesville	Noblesville		Dec 29, 1903	$12,500	16 S. 10th St.	Extensively altered, now city hall
108	North Judson	North Judson		Sep 14, 1917	$10,000	208 Keller Ave.	
109	North Manchester	North Manchester		Apr 8, 1910	$10,000	204 W. Main St.	Open 1912–1995, now law offices
110	North Vernon	North Vernon		Feb 8, 1918	$20,000	143 E. Walnut St.	Open 1920–1997, now city hall
111	Orleans	Orleans		Jan 6, 1915	$10,000	174 N. Maple St.	
112	Osgood	Osgood		Jan 9, 1913	$9,000	136 W. Ripley St.	
113	Owensville	Owensville		Dec 3, 1915	$12,500	110 S. Main St.	
114	Oxford	Oxford		Jan 14, 1914	$8,000	201 E. Smith St.	Has an addition and is still used as the public library. (April 2011)
115	Paoli	Paoli		Jan 31, 1913	$8,000	147 E. Court Street	Building is still owned by library. New location (2010) is located at 100 W. Water St.
116	Pendleton	Pendleton		Apr 25, 1911	$8,000	424 E. State St.	Open 1911–1991, currently an alternative school.
117	Peru	Peru		Mar 8, 1901	$25,000	102 E. Main St.	
118	Pierceton	Pierceton	Carnegie library building in Pierceton, Indiana July 2025	Dec 3, 1915	$10,000	101 Catholic St.	Is still in use as the public library (July 2025).
119	Plainfield	Plainfield		Nov 21, 1911	$9,000	120 S. Center St.	Open 1913–1968, now the headquarters for Triangle Fraternity
120	Plymouth	Plymouth		Jan 6, 1911	$15,000		Demolished 1976
121	Portland	Portland		Mar 12, 1901	$15,000		Demolished 2000
122	Poseyville	Poseyville		Jan 2, 1904	$5,500	55 S. Cale St.	Opened 1905
123	Princeton	Princeton		Jan 22, 1903	$15,000	124 S. Hart St.	
124	Remington	Remington		Mar 16, 1915	$10,000		Burned down in 1960
125	Rensselaer	Rensselaer		Jan 13, 1903	$12,000	301 N. Van Rensselaer St.	Now an art gallery
126	Rising Sun	Rising Sun		Dec 3, 1915	$10,000	100 N. High St.	Built 1916, now a veterans museum
127	Roachdale	Roachdale	Carnegie library building in Roachdale, Indiana June 2023	Jan 31, 1913	$10,000	100 E. Washington St.	Is still in use as the public library (July 2023).
128	Roann	Roann		Jun 11, 1914	$10,000	240 S. Chippewa Rd.	Still operating as a township library.
129	Rochester	Rochester		Dec 20, 1904	$15,000	802 Jefferson St.	Used as a private residence.
130	Rockport	Rockport		Jan 5, 1916	$17,000	210 Walnut St.	
131	Rockville	Rockville		Apr 13, 1914	$12,500	106 N. Market St.	
132	Royal Center	Royal Center		Sep 25, 1914	$10,000	203 S. Chicago St.	
133	Salem	Salem		Feb 20, 1904	$16,000	212 N. Main St.	
134	Scottsburg	Scottsburg		Nov 22, 1917	$12,500	108 S. Main St.	Still used as a library. Has been expanded.
135	Seymour	Seymour		Feb 2, 1903	$10,000	303 W. 2nd St.	
136	Shelbyville	Shelbyville		Dec 30, 1901	$20,000	57 W. Broadway St.	Still used as a public library. Additions in 1966 and 1994
137	Sheridan	Sheridan		Dec 7, 1911	$12,500	214 S. Main St.	Currently used as a private business.
138	Shoals	Shoals		Mar 14, 1913	$10,000	404 High St.	
139	Spencer	Spencer		Jan 6, 1911	$10,000	110 E. Market St.	Owen County Heritage & Culture Center
140	Sullivan	Sullivan		Jan 13, 1903	$11,000	100 S. Crowder St.	
141	Syracuse	Syracuse		Feb 3, 1917	$10,000	115 E. Main St.	Still in use as a public library
142	Tell City	Tell City		Mar 31, 1916	$10,000	548 9th St.	Currently used as a Historical Society Museum
143	Thorntown	Thorntown		Sep 27, 1912	$10,000	124 N. Market St.	Has an addition and is still used as the public library. (April 2011)
144	Tipton	Tipton		Mar 14, 1902	$13,000		Demolished 1980
145	Union City	Union City		Nov 25, 1903	$10,000	408 N. Columbia St.	
146	Valparaiso	Valparaiso		Apr 22, 1906	$20,000		Demolished in 1994 for a new library building
147	Van Buren	Van Buren		May 3, 1917	$10,000	115 S. 1st St.	Has an addition and is still used as the public library. (April 2011)
148	Vevay	Vevay		Nov 7, 1917	$12,500	210 Ferry St.	Now Vevay town hall
149	Vincennes	Vincennes		Mar 21, 1910	$35,000	502 N. 7th St.	
150	Wabash	Wabash		Mar 7, 1901	$20,000	188 W. Hill St.	Still operating as library with an addition.
151	Walton	Walton	Walton Tipton Township Public Library	Nov 17, 1914	$10,000	110 N. Main St.	
152	Warren	Warren		Apr 3, 1917	$10,000	123 E. 3rd St.	Still operating as a public library.
153	Warsaw	Warsaw	Carnegie library building in Warsaw, Indiana July 2025	Sep 29, 1915	$15,000	310 E. Main St.	Has an addition and is still in use as the public library (July 2025).
154	Washington	Washington		Mar 8, 1901	$20,000	300 W. Main St.	
155	Waterloo	Waterloo		Mar 14, 1913	$9,000	300 S. Wayne St.	
156	Waveland	Waveland		Feb 26, 1914	$10,000	115 Green St.	Still in use as a public library.
157	West Lebanon	West Lebanon		Apr 19, 1915	$7,500	200 N. High St.	Has an addition and is still used as the public library. (July 2011)
158	Westfield	Westfield		Apr 8, 1910	$9,000	104 W. Main St.	Open 1911–1983, now a print shop
159	Westville	Westville		Dec 8, 1913	$8,000	153 W. Main St.	Expanded and still in use as the community library (May 2011)
160	Whiting	Whiting		Dec 30, 1904	$15,000	1735 Oliver St.	Is still in use as the public library (July 2025).
161	Williamsport	Williamsport		Mar 31, 1916	$8,000	Fall St.	Open 1917–2002, now a private residence
162	Winamac	Winamac		Jan 6, 1911	$10,000	121 S. Riverside Dr.	
163	Winchester	Winchester		Apr 23, 1906	$12,000	125 N. East St.	Grant was received in 1906, building was completed in 1915. New addition added in the 1990s.
164	Worthington	Worthington		Apr 3, 1917	$10,000	26 N. Commercial St.	

== Academic libraries ==
	Institution	Locality	Image	Date granted	Grant amount	Location	Notes
1	DePauw University	Greencastle		Mar 21, 1905	$50,000		Open 1909–1958, now Emison Art Center
2	Earlham College	Richmond		Mar 15, 1905	$30,000		Open 1907–1964, now Tyler Hall

== See also ==
- List of libraries in the United States
