= Frankfort Commercial Historic District =

Frankfort Commercial Historic District may refer to:

- Frankfort Commercial Historic District (Frankfort, Indiana), listed on the National Register of Historic Places (NRHP) in Clinton County
- Frankfort Commercial Historic District (Frankfort, Kentucky), NRHP-listed in Franklin County

== See also ==
- South Frankfort Historic District, Frankfort, Indiana, NRHP-listed
