= EVPL =

EVPL may refer to:

- Ethernet Virtual Private Line, a data service defined by Metro Ethernet Forum, providing a point-to-point Ethernet connection
- Envoplakin, a human gene
- Evansville Vanderburgh Public Library
