= Hobart Carnegie Library =

- U.S. National Register of Historic Places
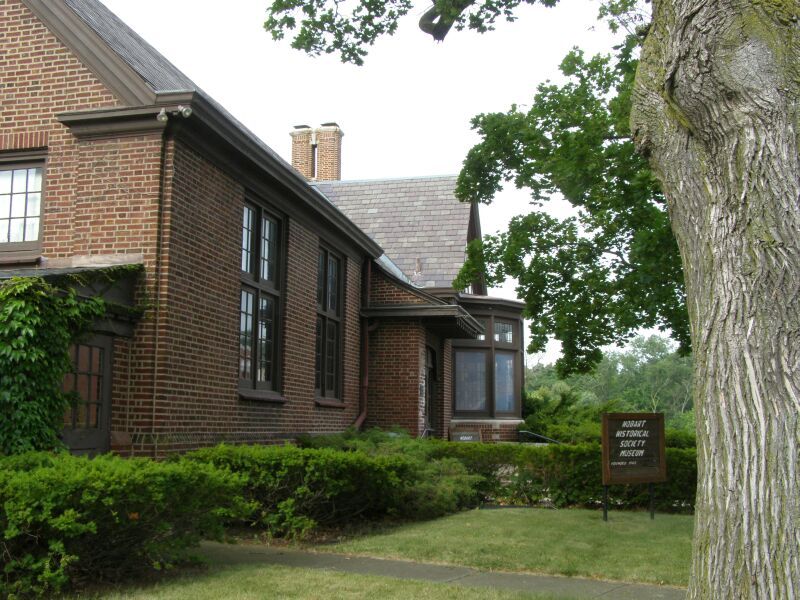
- Hobart Carnegie Library, July 2010

- Location within Indiana Location within the United States
- Location: 706 E. 4th St., Hobart, Indiana
- Coordinates: 41°31′56″N 87°15′49″W
- Area: less than one acre
- Built: 1914-1915
- Architect: Wickes, A. F.; Moe, Ingwald
- Architectural style: Tudor Revival
- NRHP reference No.: 82000047
- Added to NRHP: July 15, 1982

Hobart Carnegie Library, also known as the Hobart Historical Society Museum, is a historic Carnegie library located at Hobart, Indiana. It was built in 1914–1915, and is a one-story, Tudor Revival style brick building. The building has a high-pitched slate gable roof and a polygonal bay with leaded glass windows and entry porch. The building was constructed with a $16,000 grant from the Carnegie Foundation.

== History ==
It was listed in the National Register of Historic Places in 1982. The Hobart Public Library is the first public library in Hobart, Indiana. It hold two significant features, it is a Carnegie library and the only Tudor Revival structure in Hobart.

The Women's Reading Club of Hobart was granted $16,000 from the Carnegie Corporation in 1914–15. A. F. Wickes, an Illinois-born architect designed during a ten-year period of residency in Gary. Ingwald Moe who had emigrated from Norway in 1906 to Gary was hired to build the library. He created a large construction company. His company built many buildings for Indiana Steel, a subsidiary of U.S. Steel, and the Gary Methodist Hospital and the Palace Theater.

The Hobart Library is patterned after Floor Plan "A" as shown in "Notes on Library Buildings," a pamphlet supplied by the Carnegie Corporation. Carnegie had created the pamphlet as libraries were not common and standards were not common at this time. Recommendations on window placement and basement construction were followed. Exterior appearance was not specifically stated, other than the limiting of ornate or expensive features. There is no specific information regarding the use of the Tudor Revival design. It is the only known example of Tudor Revival in Hobart. In 1968, the library built a larger building elsewhere and sold the Carnegie building to the Hobart Historical Society. It is now a museum.

== Description ==
The building is rectangular with a high-pitched gable roof. On the south is a small gabled bay and entry porch. It is a brick structure with a slate roof in a Tudor Revival style. The roofline is outlined by an ogee-shaped cornice with returns. The brickwork is a Flemish bond, with decorative coursing in the foundation area. The double chimney is corbelled on the east facade. The main entry is on the south next to the bay window. A small porch extends from the main roof over the door. East of the entry is a polygonal bay window, with five, large, leaded glass windows. Each window has a stained glass flower decoration. The brickwork is intricate limestone trim. The bay window is topped by a gable in a half-timbered design with quatrefoil decorative elements. The west façade was built with a Palladian style window grouping and a circular ventilator in the gable area. A later addition to provide access to the basement area has altered this façade. A 1969 addition on the north façade used concrete block.

The basement is a one-half story above grade designed for lectures and meetings. The main floor is one large room. The east end was designated the children's reading room, while west end was reserved for adults. The librarian was located opposite the main door. The Carnegie floor plan "A" places windows high in the walls, to provide for bookshelves below. The east end has a fireplace center on the wall, was considered a waste of space for bookshelves. The woodwork and bookcases were of oak.

== See also ==
- List of Carnegie libraries in Indiana

== Bibliography ==
- George S. Bobinski; Carnegie libraries: Their History and Impact on American Public Library Development; Chicago, American Library Assn., 1969. Hobart Gazette. January 15, 1915, Page 1
- William F. Howat; A Standard History of Lake County, Indiana. Chicago, Lewis, 1915,
- Thomas H. Cannon and others; History of the Lake and Calumet Region of Indiana, Indianapolis, Historians' Assn., 1927
