= Carnegie Library (Muncie, Indiana) =

- Muncie Public Library
- U.S. National Register of Historic Places
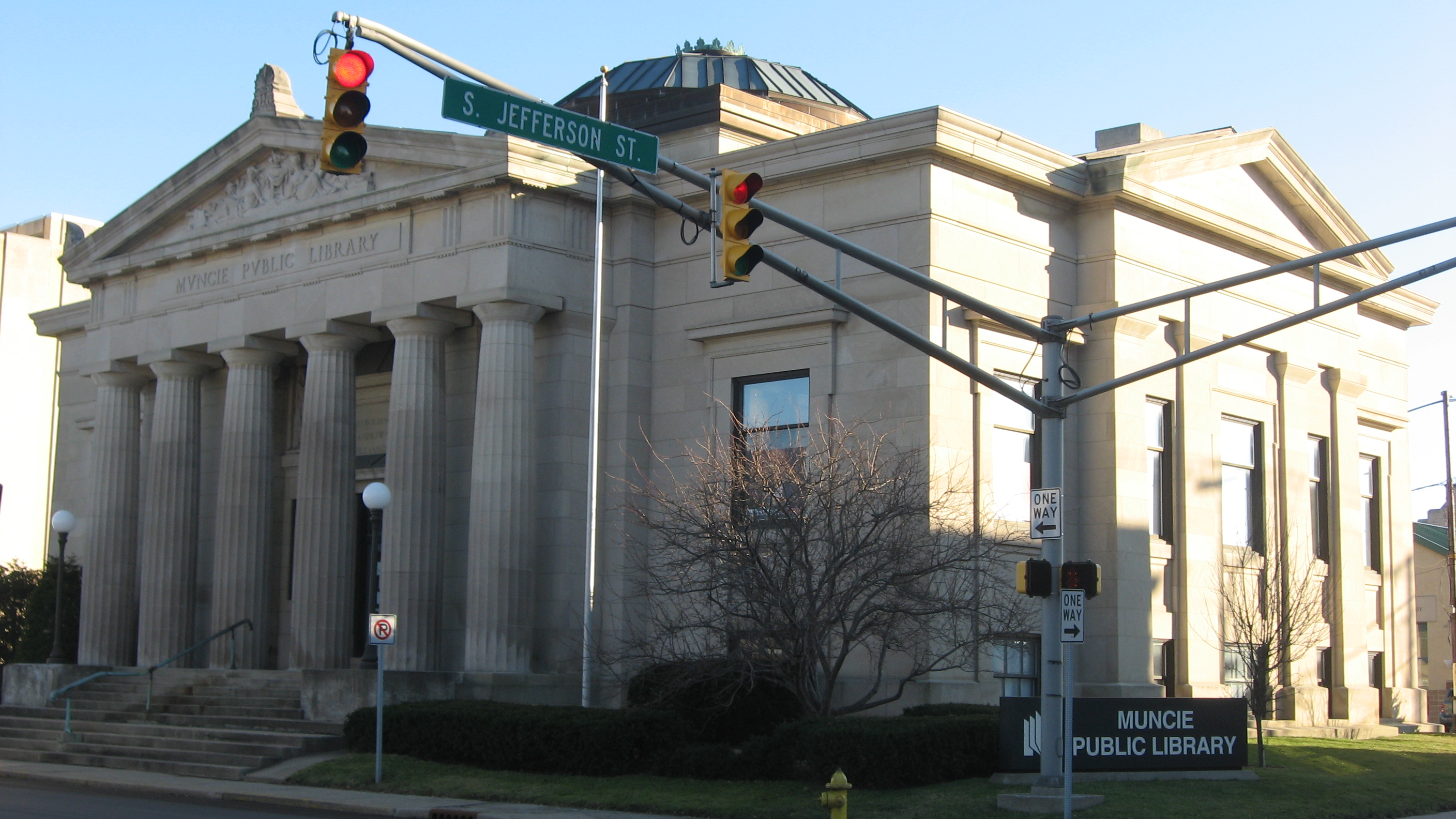
- Front and side of the library

- Location within Indiana Location within the United States
- Location: 301 E. Jackson St., Muncie, Indiana
- Coordinates: 40°11′33″N 85°23′2″W
- Area: 1 acre (0.40 ha)
- Built: 1903
- Architect: Marshall S. Mahurin
- Architectural style: Neoclassical
- NRHP reference No.: 76000019
- Added to NRHP: June 17, 1976

The Carnegie Library is a historic Carnegie library located at Muncie, Indiana, United States. The building houses the Local History & Genealogy collection and an open computer lab. The facility also provides wireless access and a meeting room for local groups to reserve. It is one of four branches that make up the Muncie Public Library System. The building was made possible through a financial donation to the City of Muncie by Andrew Carnegie to expand their library system throughout the community. The foundation for Carnegie Library was built in 1902 and the building opened to the public in 1904. It has been in continuous use as a library since its opening. The building is located in downtown Muncie at the intersection of Jackson and Jefferson.

== History ==
The Carnegie Library was dedicated on January 1, 1904. The library was built after a donation of $55,000 was given to the City of Muncie by Andrew Carnegie, with the goal to assist them in expanding their library system throughout the community. The library was one of the first structures in Indiana built from the funding of Andrew Carnegie, who was a major philanthropist, who supported library systems throughout the world. The plot of land where the building is located was a gift from local businessman George Spilker. As of 2015, the library continues to house the local history and genealogy department of the Muncie Library System.

== Architecture ==
The design and building of the library was conducted by the architectural firm of Wing and Mahurin of Fort Wayne, Indiana. The exterior structure is made of Indiana Limestone and modeled after Greek and classical architectural forms. The exterior of the building remains in its original state. The neoclassical architectural style includes a Romanesque dome located on the roof, in the central part of the library.

== Local history and genealogy ==
The Carnegie Library offers a variety of resources to aid researchers in discovering local history and their ancestry. Some of the resources include: cemetery records; census records; county histories and records; court documents; directories; family histories; funeral home records; microfilm for various Muncie and Delaware County newspapers from 1837–present; obituaries; Sanborn fire insurance maps for 1883, 1887, 1889, 1892, 1902, and 1911–1950; and vital records such as marriage, birth, and death records from the 19th and 20th centuries.

== See also ==
- List of Carnegie libraries in Indiana
