= John Stonebraker =

American football player (1918–2000)

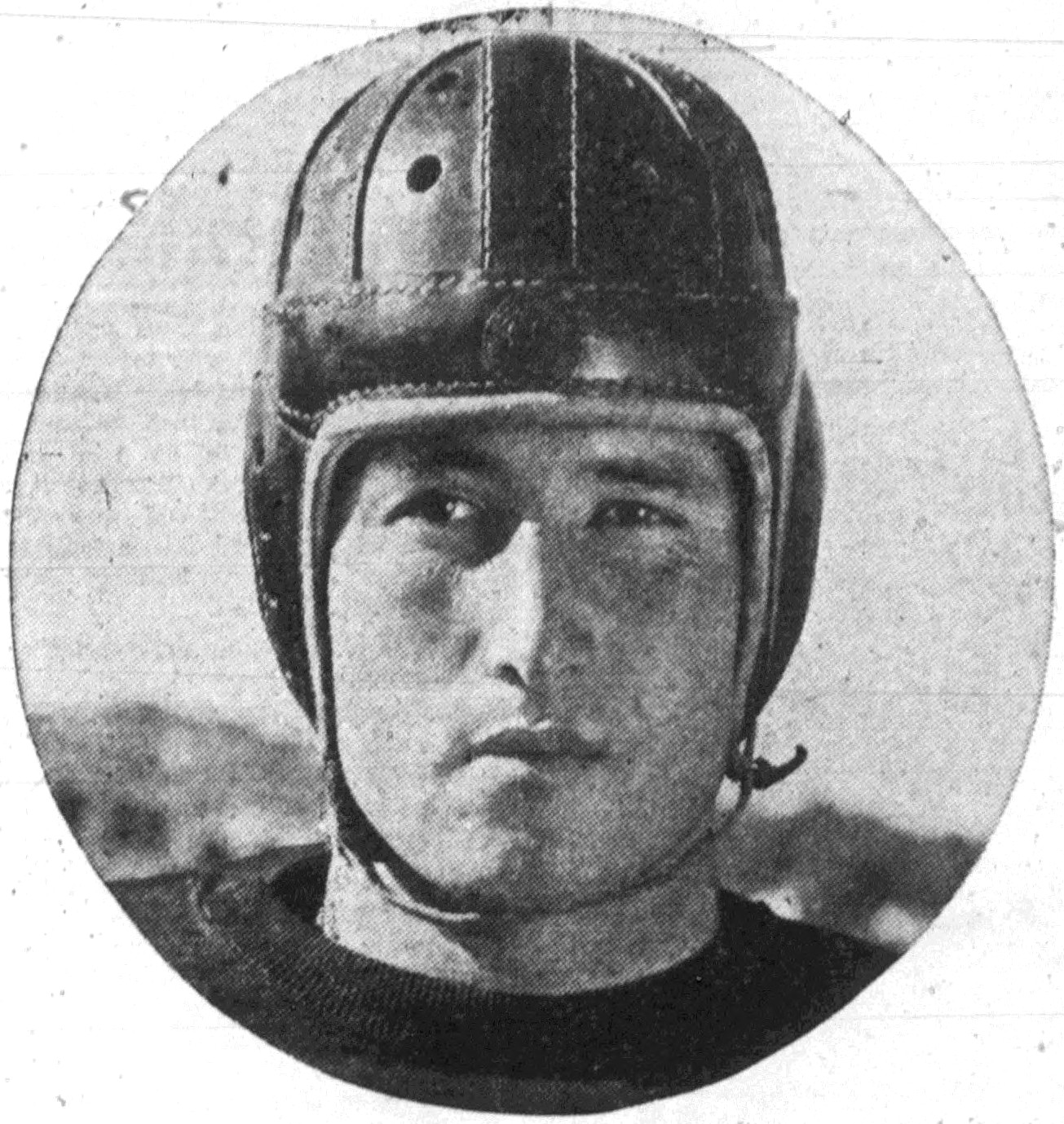
- Stonebraker, circa 1941

No. 51
- Position: End

Personal information
- Born: April 25, 1918; Frankfort, Indiana, U.S.
- Died: January 25, 2000 (aged 81); Claremont, California, U.S.
- Listed height: 6 ft 3 in (1.91 m)
- Listed weight: 200 lb (91 kg)

Career information
- High school: Fairfax (Los Angeles, California); Black-Foxe Military Institute (Hollywood, California)
- College: USC (1937–1939)

Career history
- Washington Redskins (1941)*; Hollywood Bears (1941); Green Bay Packers (1942); Los Angeles Mustangs (1943); Los Angeles Bulldogs (1943); San Diego Naval Training Station Bluejackets (1944)
- * Offseason or practice squad member only

Career statistics
- Games played: 9
- Games started: 2

John Shanklin Stonebraker (April 25, 1918 – January 25, 2000) was an American professional football player. An end, he played college football for the USC Trojans and was a member of their 1939 national championship team. He later played professionally in the National Football League (NFL) for the Green Bay Packers in 1942. He was also a member of the Washington Redskins and played two seasons in the Pacific Coast Professional Football League (PCFL) with the Hollywood Bears, Los Angeles Mustangs and Los Angeles Bulldogs, earning All-PCFL honors in 1941.

== Life and career ==
Stonebraker was born on April 25, 1918, in Frankfort, Indiana. He later moved to California where he attended Fairfax High School and later Black-Foxe Military Institute in Los Angeles. He played football as an end in high school, earning second-team all-city honors at Fairfax in 1934 and 1935. He then played for Black-Foxe during the 1936 season.

Stonebraker enrolled at the University of Southern California (USC) in 1937 and played for the USC Trojans football team. He also competed for the USC Trojans track and field team, specializing in the javelin throw and shot put. He received his first varsity letter with the football team in 1938 and was one of their "outstanding pass receivers". He helped them compile a record of 9–2 with an appearance in the 1939 Rose Bowl, where they defeated the Duke Blue Devils. In preparation for the 1939 season, Stonebraker worked moving 300-pound (140 kg) ice blocks. He caught a 41-yard touchdown pass in the team's win over rival California and helped them compile an undefeated 8–0–2 record with a national championship title. He left USC in 1940.

Stonebraker signed with the Washington Redskins of the NFL on August 13, 1941, but was released on September 22 without appearing in a game. After his release, he joined the Hollywood Bears of the Pacific Coast Professional Football League (PCFL), starting all eight games while recording one receiving touchdown. He was named to the All-PCFL team and helped the Bears compile an undefeated 8–0 record. In June 1942, he signed with the Green Bay Packers. The Green Bay Press-Gazette described him as a "rugged right end" and noted that he was "highly recommended" to the Packers. Stonebraker appeared in nine games, two as a starter, helping the Packers finish second in their division with a record of 8–2–1. He did not return to the Packers in 1943.

Stonebraker signed with the Los Angeles Mustangs of the PCFL in 1943 and later joined the Los Angeles Bulldogs towards the end of the season to play tackle. He later served in the United States Navy. In 1944, while in the Navy, he played for the San Diego Naval Training Station Bluejackets.

Stonebraker married Marjorie Frantz in May 1939 and they had a son; he died on January 25, 2000, at the Pomona Valley Hospital Medical Center, at the age of 81.
