= Bayard Park Neighborhood =

- Bayard Park Historic District
- U.S. National Register of Historic Places
- U.S. Historic district
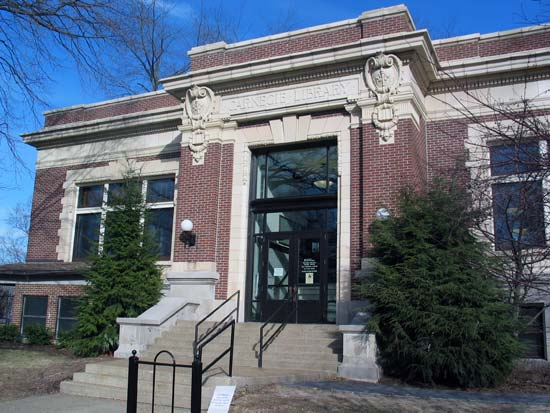
- The East Branch Library, completed in 1912 and built in the style of Beaux Arts Classicism.

- Location within Indiana Location within the United States
- Location: Roughly bounded by Gum, Kentucky, Blackford and Garvin Sts., Evansville, Indiana
- Coordinates: 37°57′57″N 87°33′0″W
- Area: 87 acres (35 ha)
- Architect: Anderson & Veatch; Multiple
- Architectural style: Bungalow, Craftsman, Late Victorian, Carpenter Cottage
- NRHP reference No.: 85001373
- Added to NRHP: June 27, 1985

The Bayard Park Neighborhood is a neighborhood in Evansville, Indiana which is bounded by Lincoln Avenue, US Highway 41, Washington Avenue and Garvin Street. The Bayard Park Historic District contains approximately 87 acres including 335 contributing buildings and one contributing site within the neighborhood boundaries. It was added to the National Register of Historic Places in 1985. The architecture of residential homes in the neighborhood include quaint 1890s Queen Anne cottages, ground-hugging bungalows, American Fourquares, and high-style Early American and English revival types. The neighborhood also features Evansville's first neighborhood park and the East Branch Library, a Carnegie Library funded by the renowned philanthropist Andrew Carnegie.

== History ==
The Bayard Park enclave took root in the last decades of the 19th century as the city of Evansville expanded eastward. The area's future as a residential area was determined when various owners of the land determined in 1893 to prohibit, via recorded plan restrictions, any type of commerce in their respective subdivisions. This made the neighborhood the first planned land development in Evansville.

== Demographics ==
Like many urbanized neighborhoods, Bayard Park has undergone significant demographic changes over the years. In 2009 about 22.9% of the residents in the historic district of the neighborhood lived below the Poverty line, compared with 13.7% in the city as a whole.
