= Manson, Indiana =

Manson
- Unincorporated community
- Location within Clinton County, Indiana
- Coordinates: 40°14′24″N 86°35′25″W
- Country: United States
- State: Indiana
- County: Clinton
- Township: Perry
- Founded: 1874
- Named for: Mahlon Manson
- Elevation: 860 ft (260 m)
- ZIP code: 46041
- FIPS code: 18-46494
- GNIS feature ID: 438535

Manson is an unincorporated community in Perry Township, Clinton County, Indiana. The town is named for Mahlon Dickerson Manson, a general in the American Civil War and Lieutenant Governor of Indiana.

== History ==
Manson was laid out June 30, 1874, by Lucinda Clark, David Clark and Rebecca Clark. The New Lights had a small church in Manson in the early 20th century.
