= La Porte Public Library =

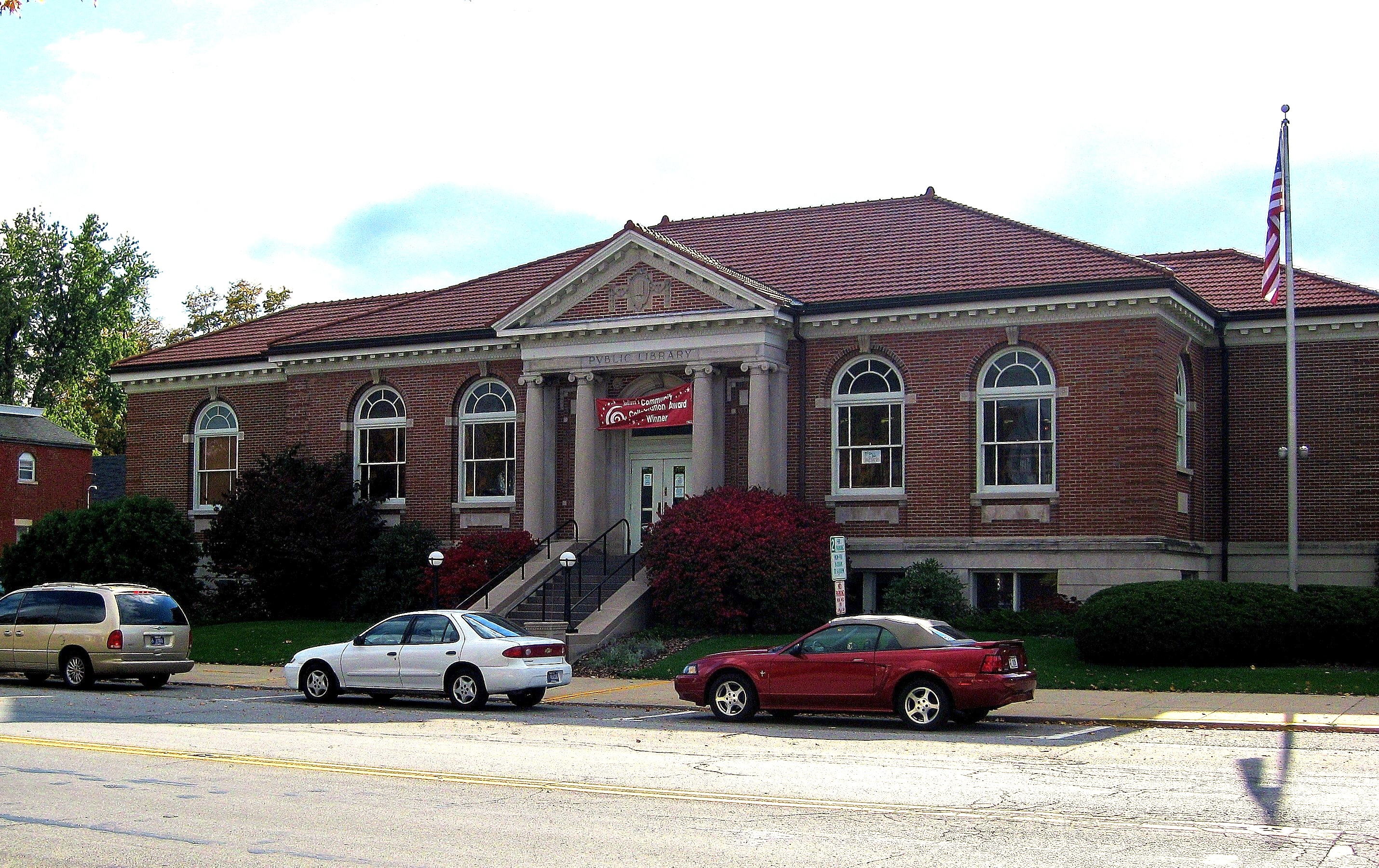
- 2008 photo
- 41°36′32″N 86°43′17″W
- Location: 904 Indiana Avenue; La Porte, Indiana, U.S.
- Type: Public library
- Established: 1896
- Architect(s): Wilson B. Parker
- Service area: La Porte County, Indiana

Other information
- Website: www.laportelibrary.org

The La Porte Public Library (predecessor, La Porte Library and Natural History Association) was established in 1896. It is located at 904 Indiana Avenue, in La Porte, Indiana, US. Wilson B. Parker was the architect of the Neoclassical style building. Signage denoting that is a Carnegie library was installed in 2002.

== Origins ==
The La Porte Public Library dates its origin from the library agitation spreading from New Harmony, Indiana, where William Maclure, the first president of the Philadelphia Academy of Science, had become associated with Robert Owen in his socialist experiment. McClure provided in his will for the establishment of workingmen's institutes, one of the provisions of which was the collection of a library of 100 volumes, and one of these libraries formed the nucleus of the La Porte Library and Natural History Association in 1863. This association had a somewhat checkered career of some 33 years, involving numerous complications in property. They had accumulated some 5,000 volumes and had a small building sufficient for their needs on an ample lot near the center of the city. They also had an additional property yielding a small income. Their income, however, from all sources was hardly large enough to keep a librarian at a small salary.

The library was always a favorite with the people of La Porte until the disturbance and hard feelings occasioned by the offer of General Orr, and its outcome resulted in neglect and indifference. From then, the association was in a poor condition, although the greater part of its property has been acquired during that time through the subscriptions to the building fund and the wills of Mr. Case and Mrs. Treat. Before the Orr invasion, the association without any invested fund, had a considerable income derived from membership fees, lectures and festivals, and entertainments of one sort and another given for its benefit. Its books and magazines were largely read and its lectures well attended. Some of the foremost men and women in the lecture field of that era who came to La Porte included: Clara Barton, Charles Sumner, Horace Greely, Ralph Waldo Emerson, Wendell Phillips, William Lloyd Garrison, and others of like prominence. These lectures proved so popular that the association accumulated some money which they wished to use for the benefit of the city.

After an agitation led by the librarian with cooperation of the Woman's Club, which had felt the lack of reference books, the association voted, in January 1896, to turn the library over to the city for a free public library, to be supported by a special tax of one-third mill, there being in the state an act providing for a tax of one-third mill for the support of a free library under control of the school board.

== Early years ==
The La Porte Public Library was organized under the law of 1881, which placed it in the care of the Board of Education, with the authority to levy a tax of not more than one mill on the dollar of all taxable property of the city.

The income-bearing property of the Library Association was sold and the proceeds devoted to enlarging the library building. The library was formally transferred to the city in April 1897. It contained at that time nearly 7,000 volumes.

In 1899, the income was about US$1,300, which was soon to be increased by a new Indiana library law passed at a session of the Indiana Legislature which authorized a one mill tax. The Indiana Library Association and the women's clubs of the state were largely instrumental in securing the passage of this law.

In 1904, the levy was one half of the allowance and brought about US$2,000 per year. With this sum, a librarian and assistant were hired, each of whom worked sixty hours per week; there was also a janitor who devoted half as much time.

About 700 volumes were added each year and 63 periodicals subscribed for. Magazines were bound and worn books rebound as needed. In 1904, there were 10,550 volumes on the shelves to which the public had free access. The circulation was 24,445 volumes per year, which was an average of 80 volumes per day.

Jennie B. Jessup was appointed librarian by the La Porte Library and Natural History Association in 1894, and continued through to the change to a free Public Library until August 1897, when Miss Emily Vail was appointed. Vail retained her position until January 2, when, upon her resignation, Jennie B. Jessup was re-appointed.

In 1904, the Board of Education and Library Trustees consisted of I. Meissner, president; J. B. Rupel, secretary; and E. C. Hall, treasurer.

In. 1911, The La Porte County Historical Society held its meetings in a room of the library.

== Architecture and fittings ==
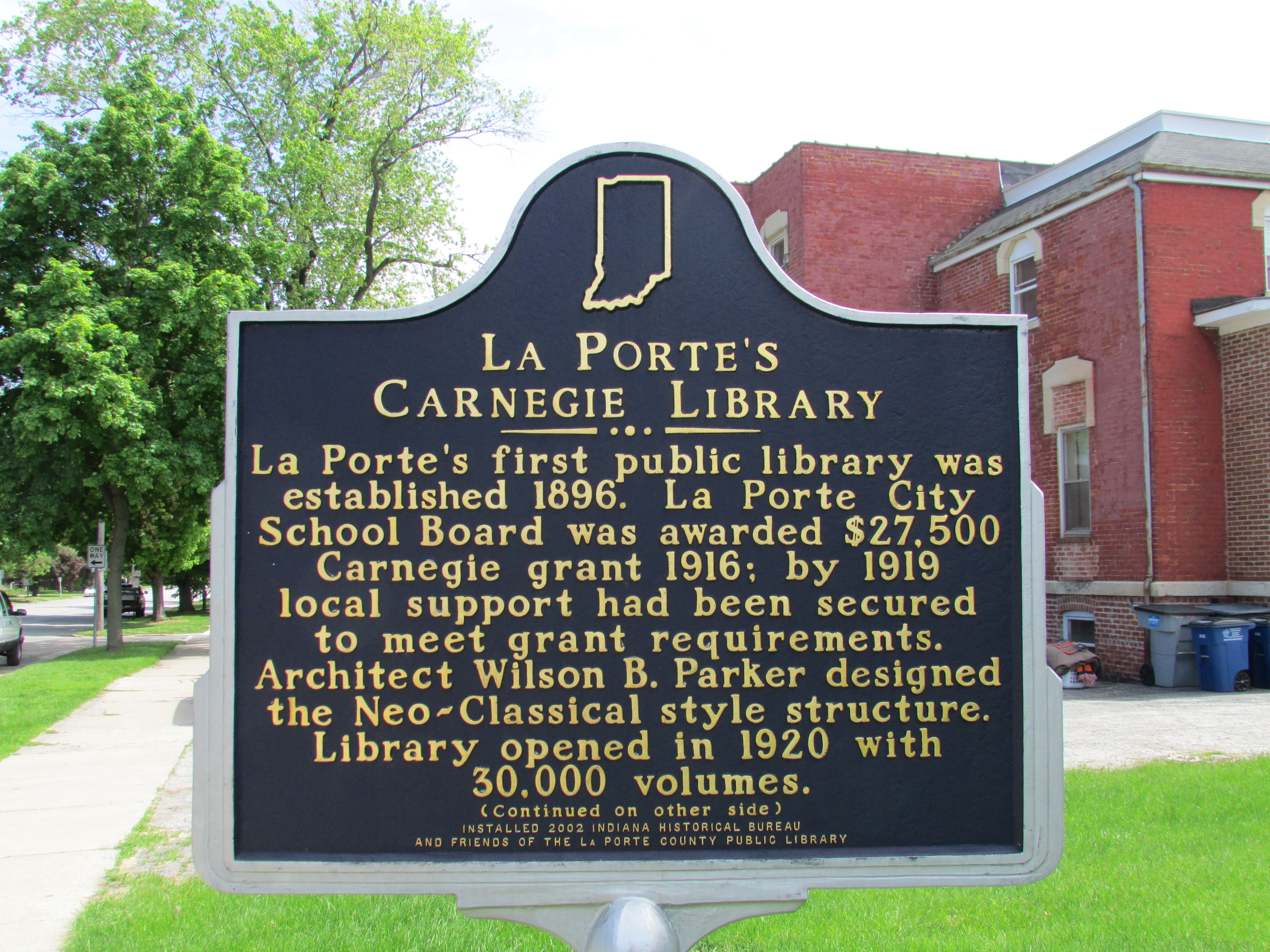
Carnegie library marker

The building is two stories and a basement. The main floor is devoted to a general reading room, reference books, children's reading room, students' reference room, librarian's office, work room and stacks. The second floor contains a large assembly hall in which are the documents, of which there is a good working collection, and an additional room is devoted to the museum of Native American relics and curiosities, bequeathed to the library by the La Porte Library and Natural History Association, as well as a large collection of Native American relics found in the county.

The heating plant and lavatories are located in the basement.

Signage denoting that is a Carnegie library (ID# 46.2002.1) was installed in 2002.

== See also ==
- List of Carnegie libraries in Indiana
