= Frankfort Municipal Airport =

Frankfort Clinton County Regional Airport
- IATA: none; ICAO: KFKR; FAA LID: FKR

Summary
- Airport type: Public
- Owner: Frankfort Airport Authority
- Operator: Jet Access
- Location: Frankfort
- Elevation AMSL: 861 ft (262 m)
- Coordinates: 40°16′22″N 86°33′47″W

Map
- Location of airport in Indiana FKR (the United States)

Runways
Direction	Length		Surface
Direction	ft	m	Surface
9/27	5,000	1,524	Asphalt
4/22	2,527	770	Asphalt

Statistics
- Aircraft operations (2019): 19,181
- Based aircraft (2021): 32
- Source: Federal Aviation Administration

Frankfort Clinton County Regional Airport (ICAO: KFKR, FAA LID: FKR) is a public airport located 3 miles (4.8 km) west of Frankfort, in Clinton County, Indiana, United States. The airport was founded in December 1960.

== Facilities and aircraft ==
Frankfort Municipal Airport covers an area of 162 acres (66 ha) at an elevation of 861 feet (262 m) above mean sea level. It has two asphalt runways: 9/27 is a 5,000 by 75 feet (1,524 X 23 m) runway with approved GPS and NDB approaches, and 4/22 is a 2,527 by 70 feet (770 X 21 m) runway.

For the 12-month period ending December 31, 2019, the airport had 19,181 aircraft operations, an average of 53 per day: 97% general aviation and 3% air taxi. In December 2021, there were 32 aircraft based at this airport: 27 single-engine, 3 multi-engine, 1 jet and 1 helicopter.

== See also ==
- List of airports in Indiana
