= Jim Davis (Indiana politician) =

American politician

James L. Davis (July 28, 1928 – November 27, 2012) was an American politician.

Born in Frankfort, Indiana, Davis served in the United States Marine Corps during World War II. He then graduated from Purdue University. Davis served in the Indiana House of Representatives 1982–1998. He died in Frankfort, Indiana.
