= Perry Township, Clinton County, Indiana =

Perry Township
- Township
- Location of Perry Township in Clinton County
- Coordinates: 40°13′17″N 86°38′25″W
- Country: United States
- State: Indiana
- County: Clinton
- Organized: 1834
- Named for: Commodore Perry

Government
  - Type: Indiana township

Area
  - Total: 33.14 sq mi (85.8 km^{2})
  - Land: 33.13 sq mi (85.8 km^{2})
  - Water: 0.01 sq mi (0.026 km^{2})
- Elevation: 840 ft (256 m)

Population (2020)
  - Total: 1,494
  - Density: 45.10/sq mi (17.41/km^{2})
- FIPS code: 18-59004
- GNIS feature ID: 453718

Perry Township is one of fourteen townships in Clinton County, Indiana. As of the 2020 census, its population was 1,494 (up from 1,459 at 2010) and it contained 596 housing units. The township was named for Oliver Hazard Perry, an American naval officer in the War of 1812.

== History ==
The first white settler to arrive in what would become Perry Township was Elijah Rogers who erected a log cabin in 1827. The township was established in September, 1834, created from a portion of Washington Township.

== Geography ==
According to the 2010 census, the township has a total area of 33.14 square miles (85.8 km^{2}), of which 33.13 square miles (85.8 km^{2}) (or 99.97%) is land and 0.01 square miles (0.026 km^{2}) (or 0.03%) is water.

=== Cities and towns ===
- Colfax

=== Unincorporated towns ===
- Manson

=== Adjacent townships ===
- Washington Township (north)
- Jackson Township (east)
- Washington Township, Boone County (southeast)
- Sugar Creek Township, Boone County (south)
- Lauramie Township, Tippecanoe County (west)
- Sugar Creek Township, Montgomery County (west)

=== Major highways ===
- Interstate 65
- U.S. Route 52
- Indiana State Road 28

=== Cemeteries ===
The township contains six cemeteries: Davis, Loveless, Manson, McKendra, Plainview and Shilo.

== Education ==
Perry Township is served by the Colfax-Perry Township Public Library.
