= Old Mishawaka Carnegie Library =

- Mishawaka Carnegie Library
- U.S. National Register of Historic Places
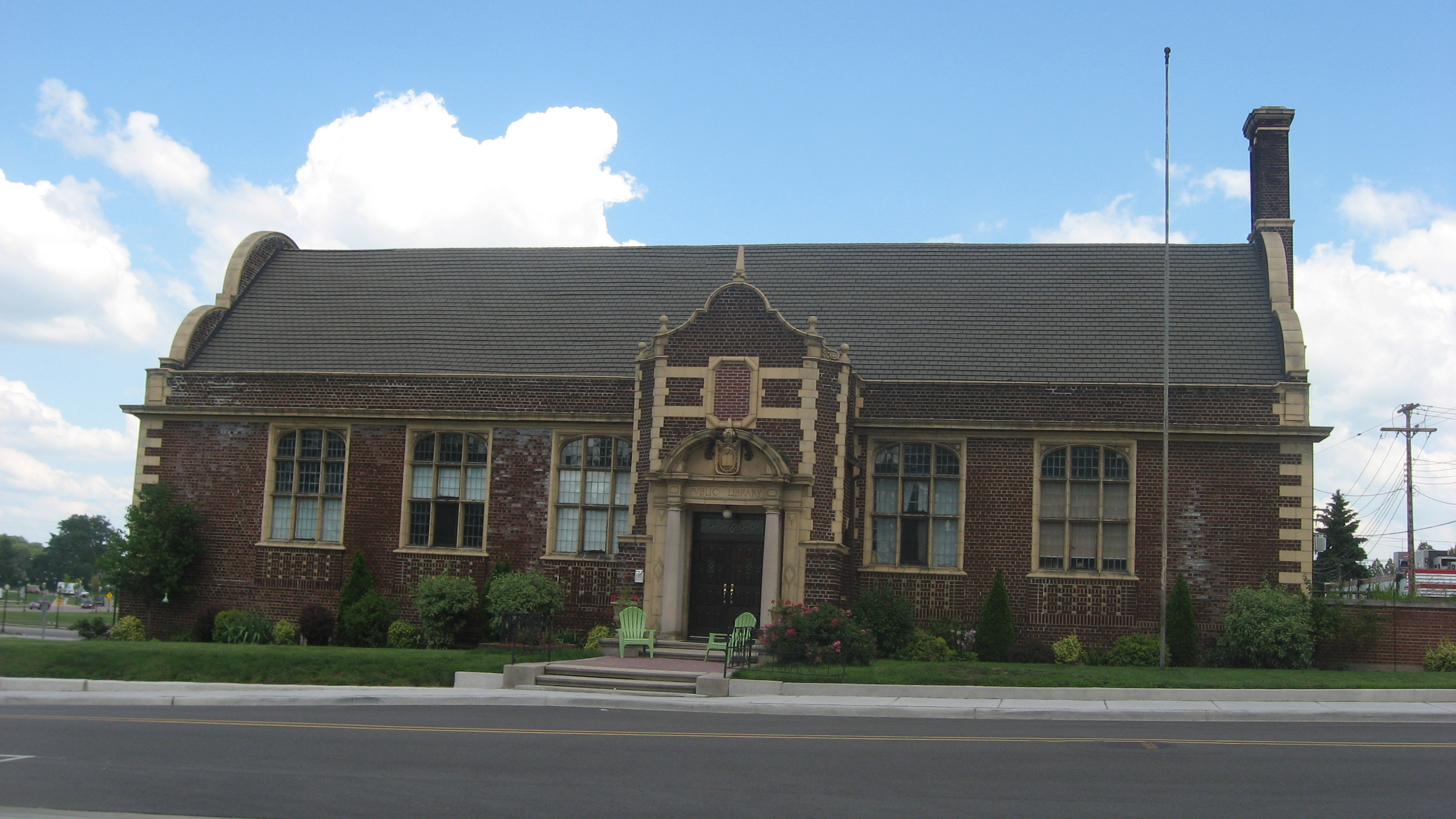
- Mishawaka Carnegie Library, July 2013

- Location within Indiana
- Location: 122 North Hill, Mishawaka, Indiana
- Coordinates: 41°39′41″N 86°11′4″W
- Area: less than one acre
- Built: 1916
- Architect: Wickes, A.F.; et.al.
- Architectural style: Late 19th And 20th Century Revivals, Jacobethan Revival
- NRHP reference No.: 98001048
- Added to NRHP: August 14, 1998

Old Mishawaka Carnegie Library is a former public library and historic Carnegie library located at Mishawaka, Indiana.

== Description and history ==
It was built in 1916, and is a one-story, Jacobethan Revival style, oriental brick building with terra cotta embellishments. It features a projecting entrance portico with limestone columns. An addition was constructed by the Works Progress Administration in 1937. It was built with a $30,000 grant from the Carnegie Foundation.

It was listed on the National Register of Historic Places in 1998. The building no longer contains a public library. Since 1969, the building has held private offices, a private residence, and in 2018 opened as Jesus Latin Grill and Tequila Bar.
