= Old Frankfort Stone High School =

- U.S. National Register of Historic Places
- U.S. Historic district – Contributing property
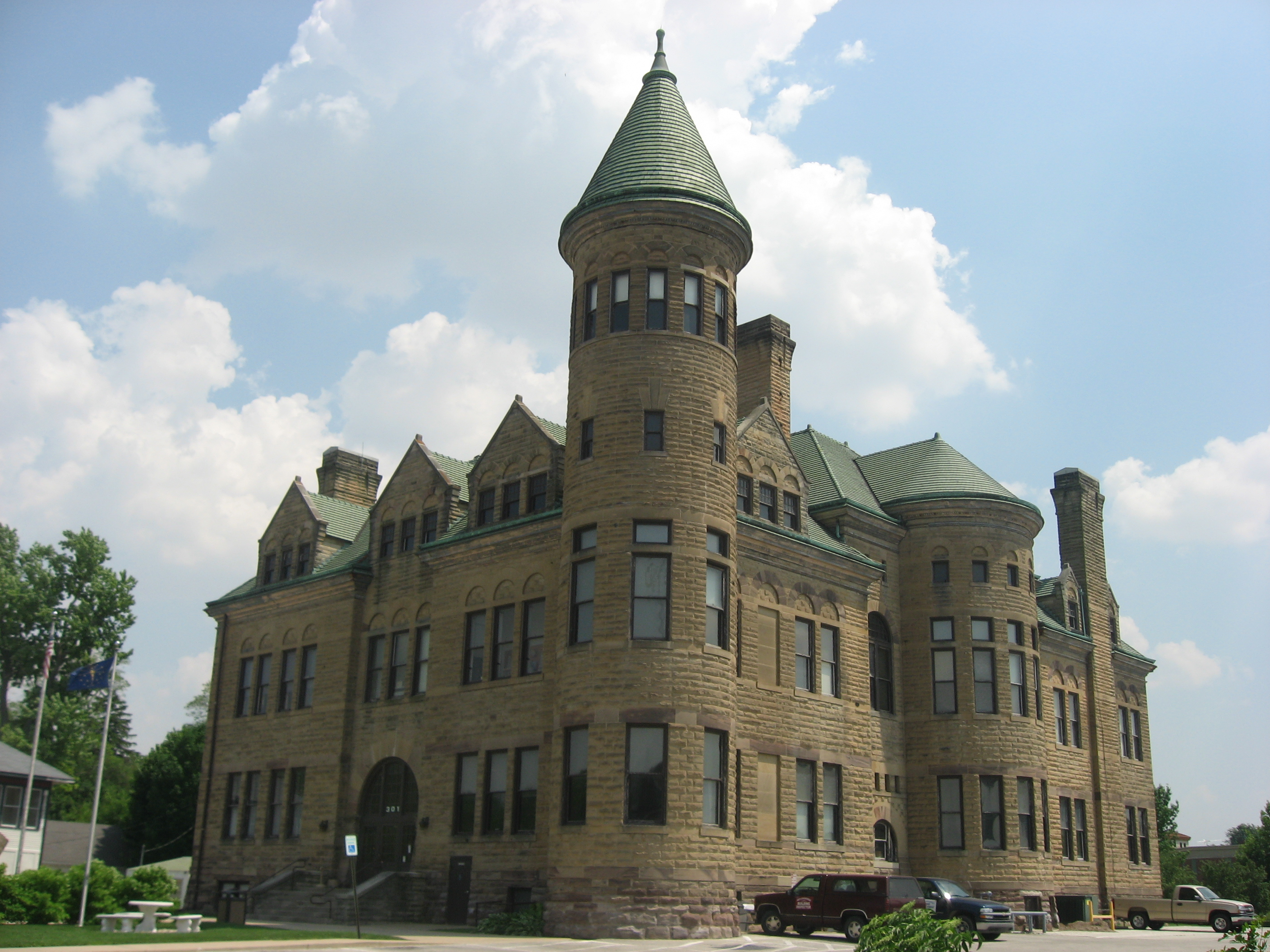
- Old Frankfort Stone High School, June 2011

- Location within Indiana Location within the United States
- Location: 301 E. Clinton, Frankfort, Indiana
- Coordinates: 40°16′48″N 86°30′32″W
- Area: 1.5 acres (0.61 ha)
- Built: 1892, 1926
- Architect: Pierce and Morgan; Paden, J.
- Architectural style: Romanesque, Richardsonian Romanesque
- NRHP reference No.: 79000012
- Added to NRHP: June 4, 1979

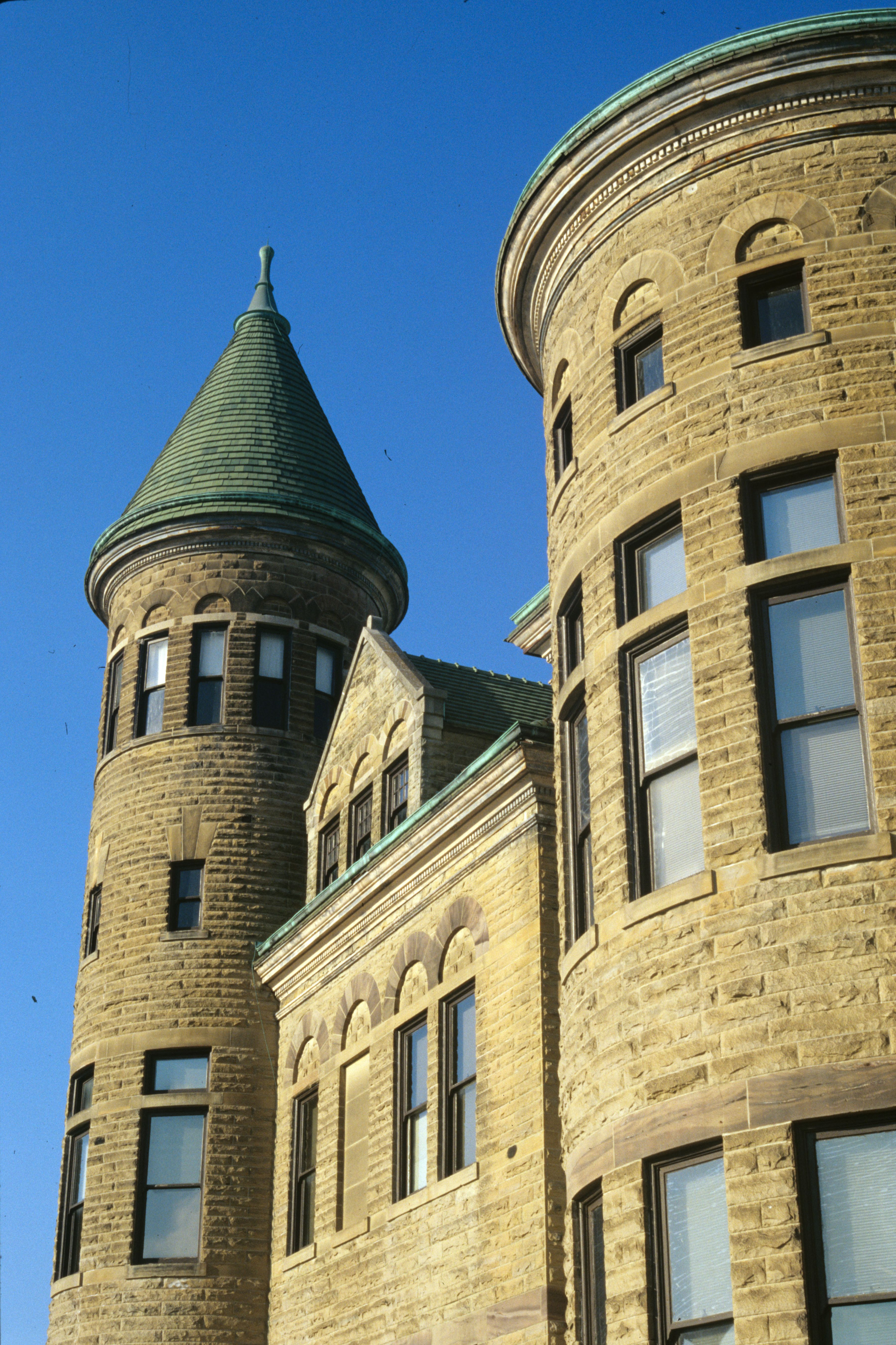
Old Frankfort Stone High School tower detail, photographed 2000

Old Frankfort Stone High School, also known as Old Stoney, is a historic high school building in Frankfort, Indiana. It was built in 1892, and is a 2 1/2-story, Richardsonian Romanesque style sandstone building on a raised basement. It has Indiana limestone trim, a large round arched entrance, four large stone chimneys, and four-story corner tower with a tall conical roof. The building was damaged by fire in 1922, and rebuilt with the work completed in 1926. The building housed a junior high school from 1962 to 1974, after which it ceased use as a public school.

It was listed on the National Register of Historic Places in 1979. It is located in the Christian Ridge Historic District.

Since 1980, the Clinton County Historical Society and Museum has been located in on the second floor of Old Stoney.
