= Rosenberger Building =

- U.S. National Register of Historic Places
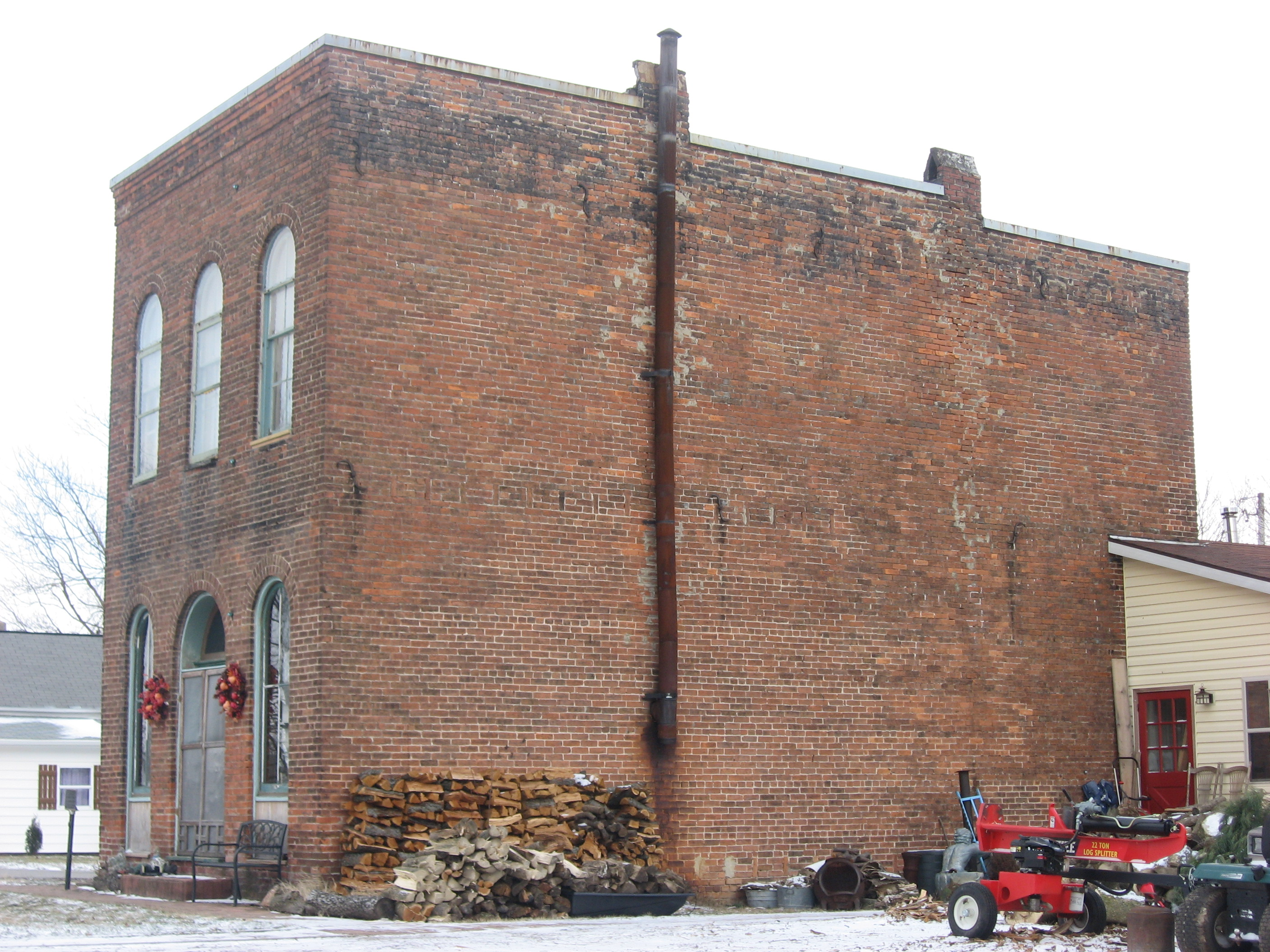
- Rosenberger Building, January 2013

- Location within Indiana Location within the United States
- Location: 83 Old Main St., Colfax, Indiana
- Coordinates: 40°11′25″N 86°39′49″W
- Area: less than one acre
- Built: c. 1850
- NRHP reference No.: 84001004
- Added to NRHP: May 3, 1984

Rosenberger Building is a historic commercial building located at Colfax, Indiana. It was built about 1850, and is a two-story, three-bay, rectangular brick building. It measures 20 feet wide and 41 feet deep, and has a 16 feet by 24 feet frame rear addition. It features round arch window openings. It is the oldest commercial building in Colfax.

It was listed on the National Register of Historic Places in 1984.
