= Frankfort, Indiana =

- City
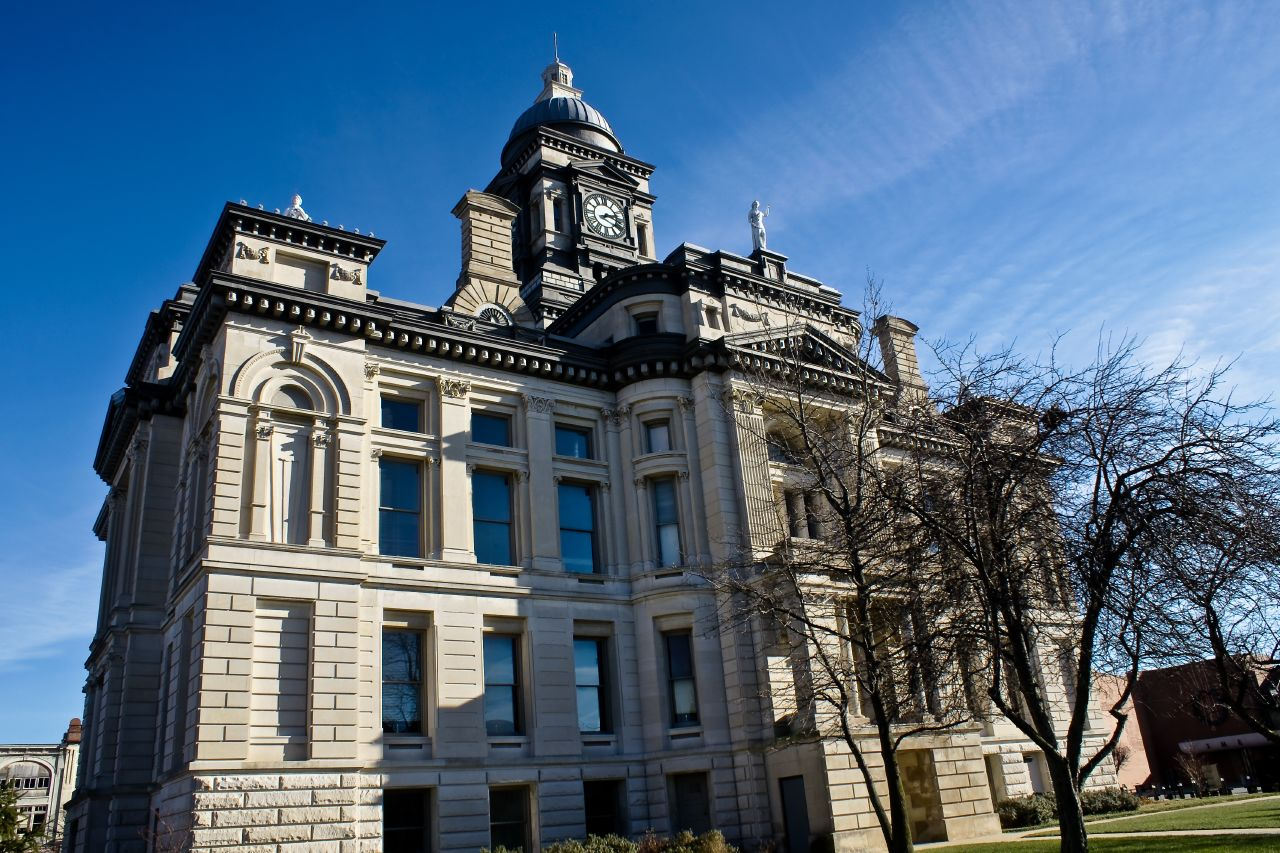
- Clinton County Courthouse in Frankfort

- Flag Logo

- Location of Frankfort in Clinton County, Indiana.
- Coordinates: 40°16′47″N 86°30′21″W
- Country: United States
- State: Indiana
- County: Clinton
- Townships: Center, Washington, Perry
- Founded: 1830
- Incorporated: 1846
- Named for: Frankfurt am Main

Government
  - Mayor: Judith Sheets (R)

Area
  - Total: 8.05 sq mi (20.86 km^{2})
  - Land: 8.05 sq mi (20.86 km^{2})
  - Water: 0 sq mi (0.00 km^{2})
- Elevation: 860 ft (260 m)

Population (2020)
  - Total: 16,715
  - Density: 2,075.1/sq mi (801.21/km^{2})
- Time zone: UTC−5 (EST)
  - Summer (DST): UTC−4 (EDT)
- ZIP Code: 46041
- Area code: 765
- FIPS code: 18-25324
- GNIS feature ID: 2394805
- Website: frankfort-in.gov

Frankfort is a city in Clinton County, Indiana, United States. It had a population of 16,715 as of the 2020 census. The city is the county seat of Clinton County.

== History ==
Brothers John, William and Nicholas Pence, previously of Warren County, Ohio, settled on the land on which Frankfort now stands in 1829, having entered it from the government in 1827 and 1828. In 1830, the brothers donated 60 acres (240,000 m^{2}) of the land to the county commissioners, a donation which led to the establishment of the county seat at that site rather than in Jefferson, a community which had also been vying for the honor. The new town was named Frankfort at the brothers' request and honors their German great-grandparents' home of Frankfurt am Main.

The town of Frankfort was laid off on the 60-acre (240,000 m^{2}) tract by William Douglass, the county agent, and the plat filed on June 8, 1830. The original plat consisted of 64 lots in eight blocks surrounding a public square where the courthouse now stands. The county board paid contractors Allen & Michael the sum of $20 to erect the first courthouse, a 1 1/2-story temporary structure made of logs hewn from trees that grew on the square and surrounding streets. Its replacement was built by contractor John Elder in 1837 and 1838 for $12,000 and operated for 45 years. Indianapolis architect George W. Bunting in 1881 designed the third courthouse, a 165-foot (50 m) tall structure built of Indiana limestone by contractors Farman & Pearce for approximately $200,000. Its cornerstone was laid September 2, 1882.

The youngest elected mayor of Frankfort was Robert Keene at the age of 21 when he took office in January 1922 just one month prior to the fire at Old Stoney on February 24, 1922. At the time of the fire, Old Stoney was used as the high school. Today, Old Stoney is used as City Hall.

In addition to Old Stoney, the Christian Ridge Historic District, Clinton County Courthouse, Charles H. and Emma Condon House, Frankfort Commercial Historic District, and South Frankfort Historic District are listed on the National Register of Historic Places.

== Geography ==
According to the 2010 census, Frankfort has a total area of 6.31 square miles (16.34 km^{2}), all land.

== Demographics ==
Historical population
Census	Pop.	Note	%±
1850	582		—
1860	773		32.8%
1870	1,300		68.2%
1880	2,803		115.6%
1890	5,919		111.2%
1900	7,100		20.0%
1910	8,634		21.6%
1920	11,585		34.2%
1930	12,196		5.3%
1940	13,706		12.4%
1950	15,028		9.6%
1960	15,302		1.8%
1970	14,956		−2.3%
1980	15,168		1.4%
1990	14,754		−2.7%
2000	16,662		12.9%
2010	16,422		−1.4%
2020	16,715		1.8%
Source: US Census Bureau

=== 2020 census ===
As of the 2020 census, Frankfort had a population of 16,715. The median age was 34.0 years. 28.5% of residents were under the age of 18 and 15.1% of residents were 65 years of age or older. For every 100 females there were 96.6 males, and for every 100 females age 18 and over there were 93.2 males age 18 and over.

99.6% of residents lived in urban areas, while 0.4% lived in rural areas.

There were 6,068 households in Frankfort, of which 36.8% had children under the age of 18 living in them. Of all households, 42.0% were married-couple households, 19.7% were households with a male householder and no spouse or partner present, and 28.8% were households with a female householder and no spouse or partner present. About 28.3% of all households were made up of individuals and 12.8% had someone living alone who was 65 years of age or older.

There were 6,614 housing units, of which 8.3% were vacant. The homeowner vacancy rate was 1.4% and the rental vacancy rate was 7.9%.

Racial composition as of the 2020 census
Race	Number	Percent
White	11,483	68.7%
Black or African American	149	0.9%
American Indian and Alaska Native	130	0.8%
Asian	52	0.3%
Native Hawaiian and Other Pacific Islander	5	0.0%
Some other race	2,981	17.8%
Two or more races	1,915	11.5%
Hispanic or Latino (of any race)	5,515	33.0%

=== 2010 census ===
As of the census of 2010, there were 16,422 people, 5,835 households, and 3,972 families living in the city. The population density was 2,602.5 inhabitants per square mile (1,004.8/km^{2}). There were 6,551 housing units at an average density of 1,038.2 per square mile (400.9/km^{2}). The racial makeup of the city was 71.9% White, 0.6% African American, 0.3% Native American, 0.2% Asian, 13.1% from other races, and 1.8% from two or more races. Hispanic or Latino of any race were 27.0% of the population.

There were 5,835 households, of which 38.2% had children under the age of 18 living with them, 47.0% were married couples living together, 14.9% had a female householder with no husband present, 6.2% had a male householder with no wife present, and 31.9% were non-families. 26.5% of all households were made up of individuals, and 11.2% had someone living alone who was 65 years of age or older. The average household size was 2.71 and the average family size was 3.26.

The median age in the city was 33.5 years. 28.2% of residents were under the age of 18; 9.9% were between the ages of 18 and 24; 25.4% were from 25 to 44; 22.8% were from 45 to 64; and 13.8% were 65 years of age or older. The gender makeup of the city was 49.3% male and 50.7% female.

=== 2000 census ===
As of the census of 2000, there were 16,662 people, 6,279 households, and 4,175 families living in the city. The population density was 3,240.5 inhabitants per square mile (1,251.2/km^{2}). There were 6,682 housing units at an average density of 1,299.6 per square mile (501.8/km^{2}). The racial makeup of the city was 70.08% White, 0.47% African American, 0.16% Native American, 0.28% Asian, 0.03% Pacific Islander, 7.84% from other races, and 1.14% from two or more races. Hispanic or Latino of any race were 20.53% of the population.

There were 6,279 households, out of which 33.0% had children under the age of 18 living with them, 49.5% were married couples living together, 11.8% had a female householder with no husband present, and 33.5% were non-families. 28.7% of all households were made up of individuals, and 13.6% had someone living alone who was 65 years of age or older. In the city, the population was spread out, with 27.0% under the age of 18, 10.9% from 18 to 24, 27.3% from 25 to 44, 19.1% from 45 to 64, and. 15.7% who were 65 years of age or older. The median age was 34 years. For every 100 females, there were 95.0 males. For every 100 females age 18 and over, there were 90.0 males.

The median income for a household in the city was $33,275, and the median income for a family was $42,686. Males had a median income of $32,092 versus $23,722 for females. The per capita income for the city was $15,393. About 8.8% of families and 11.7% of the population were below the poverty line, including 12.1% of those under age 18 and 10.9% of those age 65 or over.

== Transportation ==
=== Airport ===
Frankfort is served by the Frankfort Municipal Airport.

=== Highways ===
U.S. 421 and Indiana state routes 28, 39 and 75 converge in the city. Interstate 65 is a short distance to the west of Frankfort.

=== Rail ===
The city is at the junction of several rail lines. The Monon Railroad (The Hoosier and the Tippecanoe Chicago-Indianapolis trains), New York, Chicago and St. Louis Railroad (Nickel Plate) (The Blue Arrow and the Blue Dart St. Louis-Cleveland trains) and the Pennsylvania Railroad (The Kentuckian [Chicago-Indianapolis] and South Wind [Chicago-Miami/Tampa/St. Petersburg] trains) ran passenger trains through the city. Successor railroads such as CSX and Norfolk Southern have the tracks or right of ways of the routes today.

== Notable people ==
- Charles Aidman, film, stage and television actor.
- Anthony Caruso, film and television actor.
- Everett Case, school basketball coach
- Kyle Cook band member: Matchbox Twenty and The New Left
- Reuben W. Coon, Illinois state legislator, newspaper editor, and lawyer
- Jim Davis, legislator
- Harry Endicott, racing driver
- Will Geer, film, television and stage actor
- Rana Foroohar, financial reporter for Time
- Mahlon D. Manson, Union Army brigadier general
- Linley E. Pearson, 37th Indiana Attorney General
- Harold Shaw, racing driver
- John Stonebraker, NFL player
- James P. Ulm, U.S. Air Force brigadier general
- Talitha Washington, mathematician at Howard University

== Education ==
Public

- Community Schools of Frankfort

In the fall of 2013 Ivy Tech opened a campus in Frankfort on a site that once housed The Frankfort Times, the local newspaper.

The city has a free lending library, the Frankfort Community Public Library.
