= Charles H. and Emma Condon House =

Historic house in Indiana, United States

- U.S. National Register of Historic Places
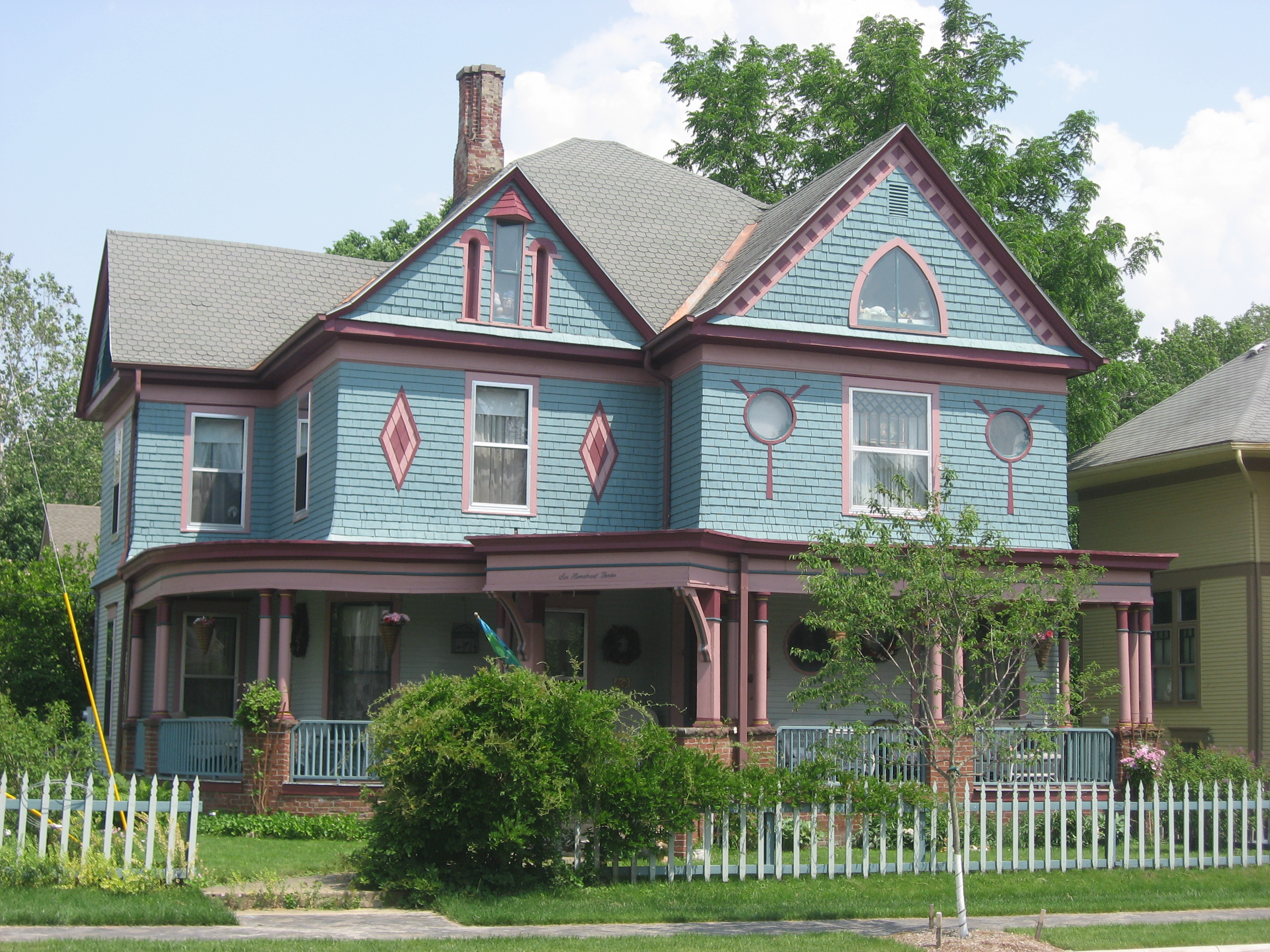
- Charles H. and Emma Condon House, June 2011

- Location within Indiana Location within the United States
- Location: 603 S. Jackson St., Frankfort, Indiana
- Coordinates: 40°16′33″N 86°30′36″W
- Area: less than one acre
- Built: c. 1902
- Architectural style: Queen Anne
- NRHP reference No.: 96001545
- Added to NRHP: January 2, 1997

Charles H. and Emma Condon House, also known as the Andrew J. Thompson House, is a historic home located at Frankfort, Indiana, United States. It was built about 1902, and is a two-story, Queen Anne style frame dwelling on a brick foundation. It has a clapboard and shingled exterior and an irregularly gabled and hipped roof. It features a one-story wraparound porch with paired Doric order columns. It was restored in the 1990s.

It was listed on the National Register of Historic Places in 1997.
