= Clinton County Courthouse (Indiana) =

- U.S. National Register of Historic Places
- U.S. Historic district – Contributing property
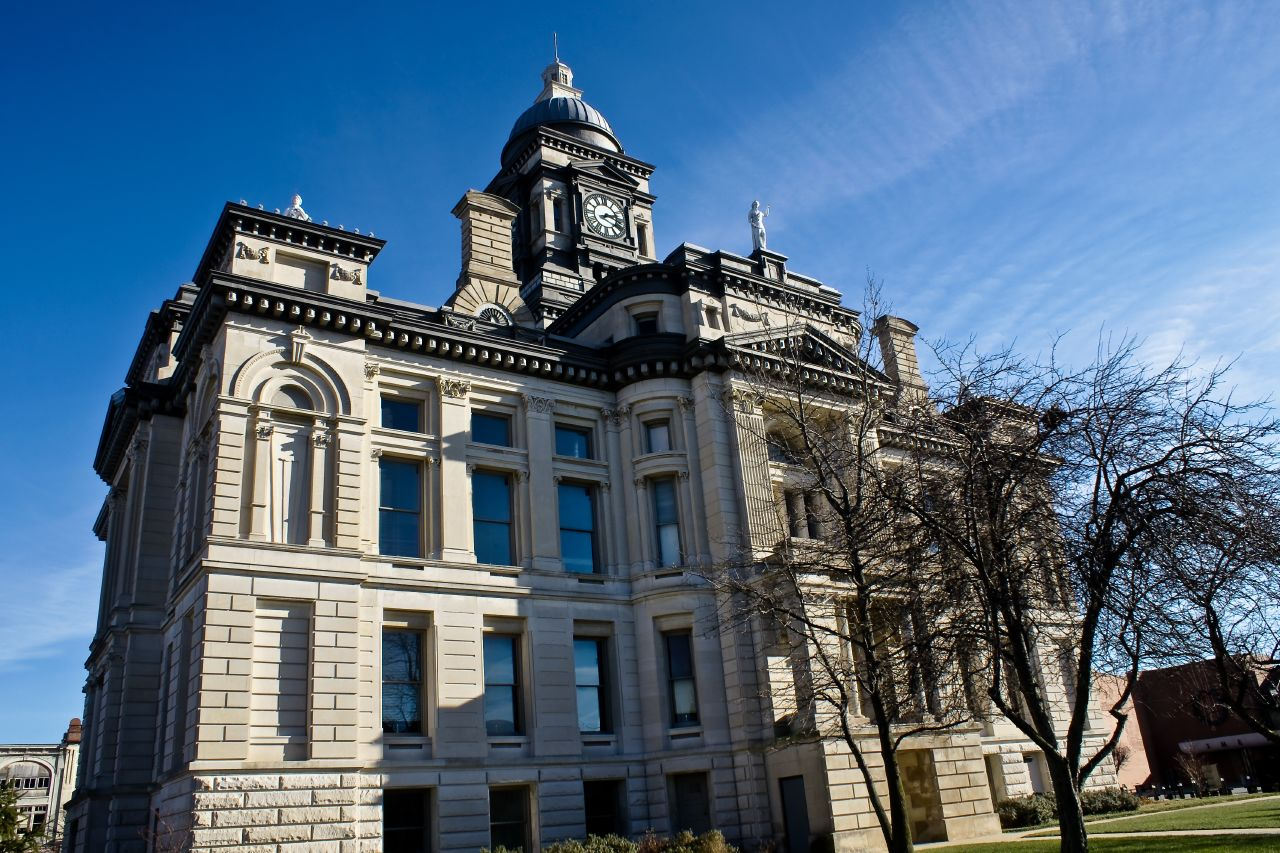
- Front of the courthouse

- Location within Indiana Location within the United States
- Interactive map showing the location of Clinton County Courthouse
- Location: Public Sq., Frankfort, Indiana
- Coordinates: 40°16′52″N 86°30′40″W
- Area: 2 acres (0.81 ha)
- Built: 1882
- Architect: Bunting, George W.
- Architectural style: Second Empire
- NRHP reference No.: 78000027
- Added to NRHP: December 5, 1978

The Clinton County Courthouse is a historic courthouse located at 50 North Jackson Street in Frankfort, Indiana, United States. Built 1882–1884. the courthouse was designed by George W. Bunting, who also designed courthouses in Anderson (Madison County) and Franklin (Johnson County). The Clinton County Courthouse is a three-story, Second Empire style limestone building adorned with statuary and a 165-foot domed central tower with a clock. The courthouse cost $170,450 to build in 1882. The courthouse is still in use as the county courthouse.

A virtual duplicate of the Clinton Courthouse was built in Anderson, Indiana (razed) in red brick at the same time as the Clinton County Courthouse.

It was added to the National Register of Historic Places in 1978. It is located in the Frankfort Commercial Historic District.
