= Christian Ridge Historic District =

Historic district in Indiana, United States

- U.S. National Register of Historic Places
- U.S. Historic district
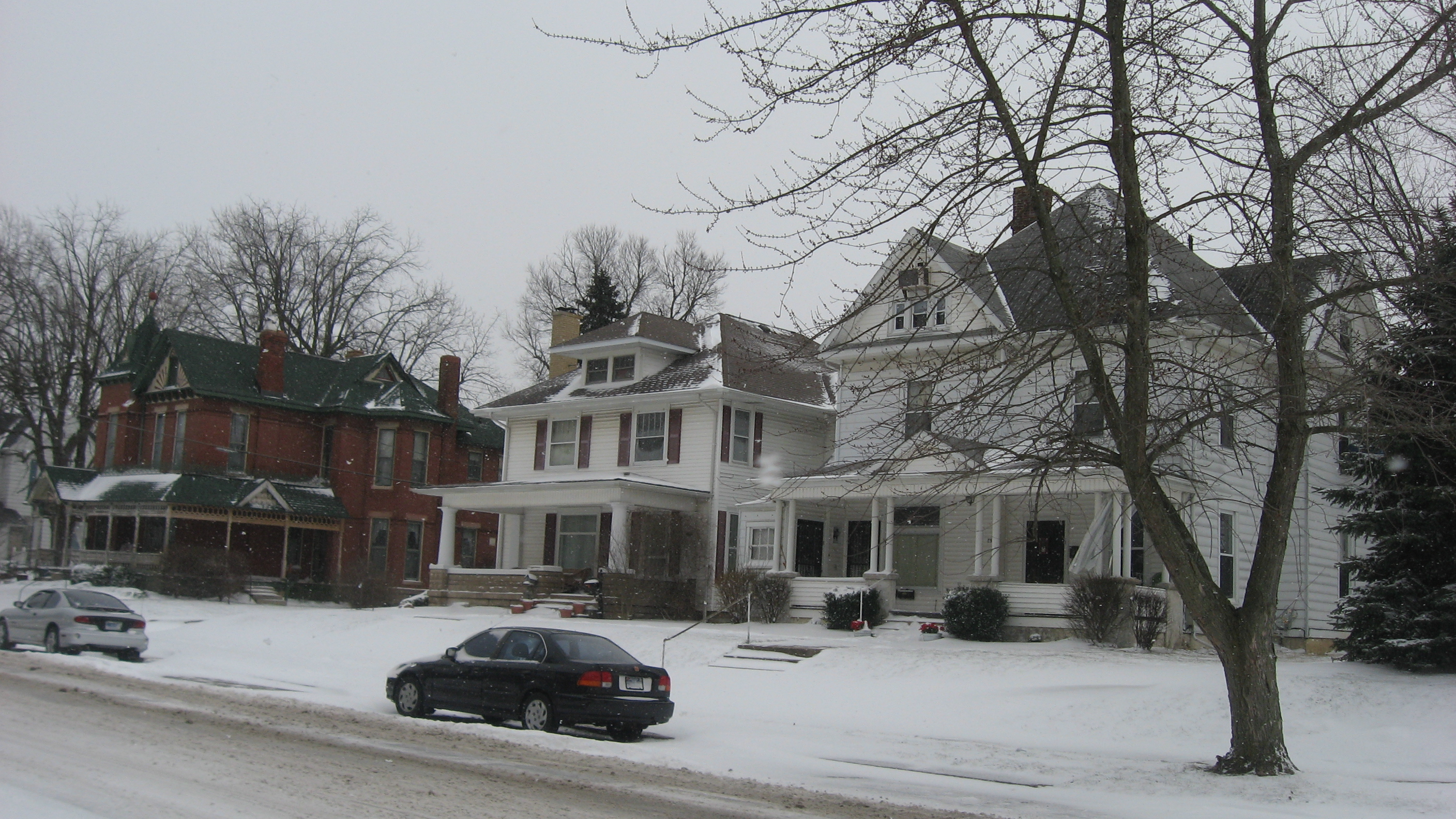
- Houses in the Christian Ridge Historic District, January 2012

- Location within Indiana Location within the United States
- Location: Roughly bounded by Prairie Cr., Young & E. Washington Sts., & Harvard Terr., Frankfort, Indiana
- Coordinates: 40°16′43″N 86°30′21″W
- Area: 160 acres (65 ha)
- Built: 1832
- Architect: Leonard, Rodney; Ross, John A.
- Architectural style: Late Victorian, Late 19th And 20th Century Revivals
- NRHP reference No.: 03000540
- Added to NRHP: June 22, 2003

Christian Ridge Historic District is a national historic district located at Frankfort, Indiana. The district encompasses 430 contributing buildings and 2 contributing structures in a predominantly residential section of Frankfort. The district developed between about 1832 and 1952, and includes notable examples of Queen Anne, Colonial Revival, and Bungalow / American Craftsman style residential architecture. Located in the district is the separately listed Old Frankfort Stone High School.

It was added to the National Register of Historic Places in 2003.
