= Kirklin Public Library =

- U.S. National Register of Historic Places
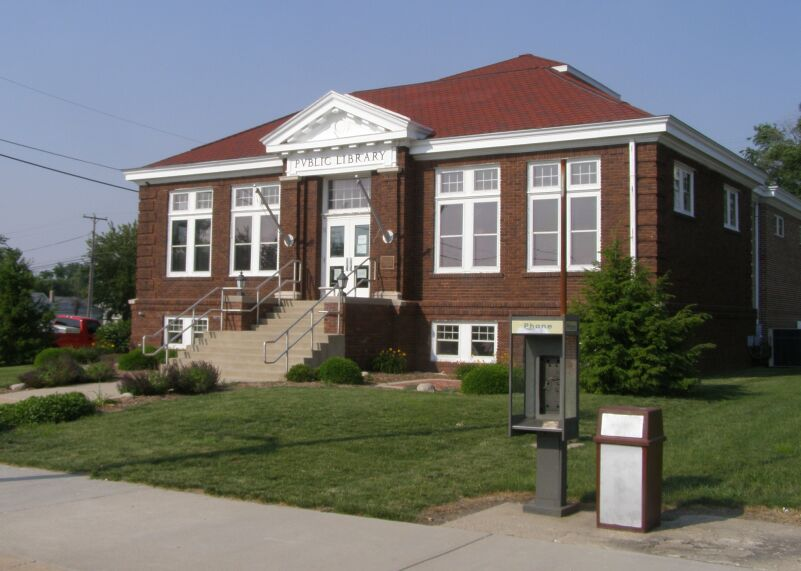
- Kirklin Public Library, June 2011

- Location within Indiana Location within the United States
- Location: 115 N. Main St., Kirklin, Indiana
- Coordinates: 40°11′36″N 86°21′37″W
- Area: less than one acre
- Built: 1915
- Architect: Brookie, True L., & McGinnis
- Architectural style: Classical Revival
- NRHP reference No.: 95000206
- Added to NRHP: March 3, 1995

Kirklin Public Library is a historic Carnegie library located at Kirklin, Indiana. It was built in 1915, and is a one-story, Classical Revival style brick building on a raised basement. It features a low-pitched hipped tile roof. It was built in part with $7,500 provided by the Carnegie Foundation.

It was listed on the National Register of Historic Places in 1995.

The Kirklin Public Library today is one of three active lending libraries in Clinton County.
