= Frankfort Commercial Historic District (Frankfort, Indiana) =

Historic district in Indiana, United States

- U.S. National Register of Historic Places
- U.S. Historic district
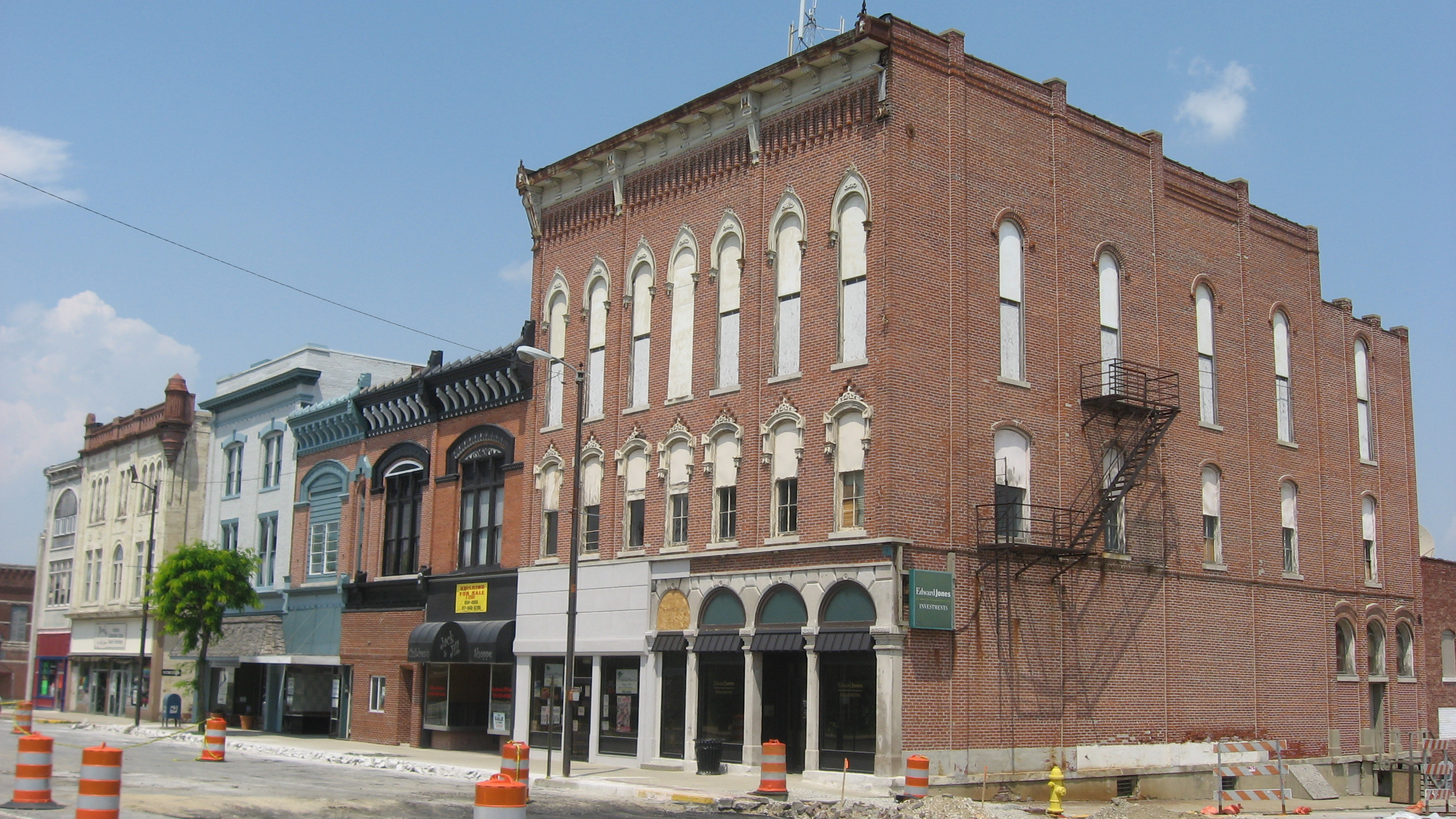
- Jackson Street in the Frankfort Commercial Historic District, June 2011

- Location within Indiana Location within the United States
- Location: Roughly bounded by Walnut, Columbia, Morrison Sts. and Prairie Creek, Frankfort, Indiana
- Coordinates: 40°16′54″N 86°30′42″W
- Area: 15 acres (6.1 ha)
- Built: 1870
- Architectural style: Italianate, Romanesque, Classical Revival
- NRHP reference No.: 98001055
- Added to NRHP: August 14, 1998

Frankfort Commercial Historic District is a national historic district located at Frankfort, Indiana. The district encompasses 57 contributing buildings and 6 contributing structures in the central business district of Frankfort. The district developed between about 1870 and 1947, and includes notable examples of Italianate, Romanesque Revival, and Classical Revival style architecture. Located at the center of the district is the separately listed Clinton County Courthouse. Other notable buildings include the Harker Building (1890), Frankfort Municipal Building (1916), Coca-Cola building (mid-1920s), Ross Building (1897), Keys Building (1899), and K. F. & W Traction Station (early 1920s).

It was added to the National Register of Historic Places in 1998.
