= Evansville Vanderburgh Public Library =

Public library system in Evansville, Indiana

Coordinates: 37.971411°N 87.565594°W

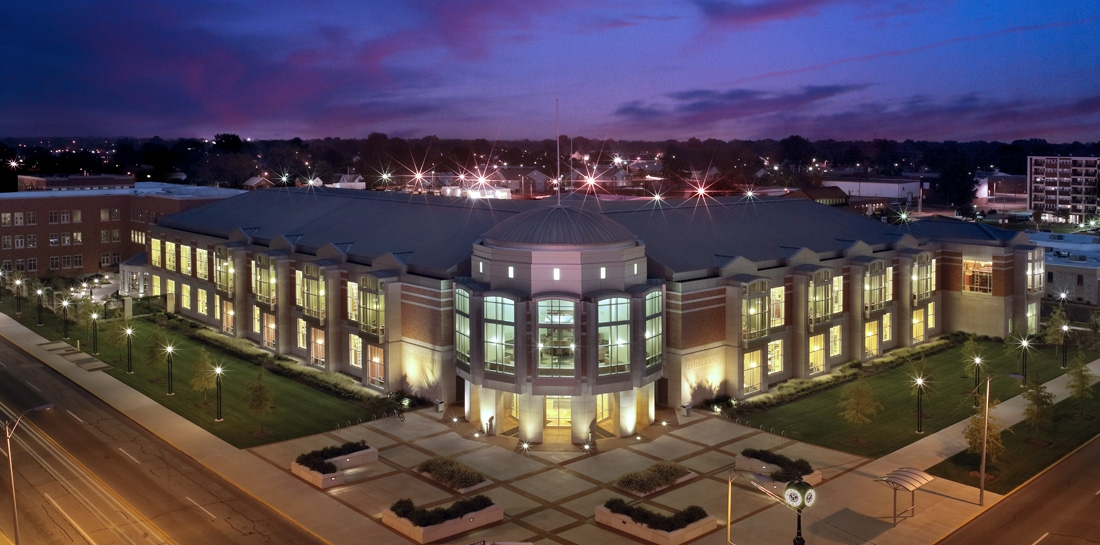
- Central Library
- Location: Evansville, Indiana
- Established: 1848
- Branches: 8

Collection
- Size: 950,023

Access and use
- Population served: 179,703 (Vanderburgh)

Other information
- Budget: $12,094,015
- Director: R. Scott Kinney
- Employees: 186
- Website: www.evpl.org

The Evansville Vanderburgh Public Library (EVPL) is a public library system serving Evansville and Vanderburgh County in Indiana, USA. The EVPL also supplements the services provided by the Evansville Vanderburgh School Corporation and has the authority to approve the tax levy of the independently run and operated Willard Library.

The EVPL had a total circulation of 2,922,126 and had 1,842,085 in-person visits to its system in 2013. EVPL was rated a five star library by the Library Journal, which places it in the top 1% of public libraries in the United States. EVPL also obtained a Top Ten library ranking in the 2010 edition of Hennen's American Public Library Ratings, achieving a number eight ranking within its population category. In addition to the Central Library, there is also the East and West, McCollough, North Park, Oaklyn, Red Bank, and Stringtown Branches.

== History ==
Evansville's public library system was started in 1848 in the county auditor's office.

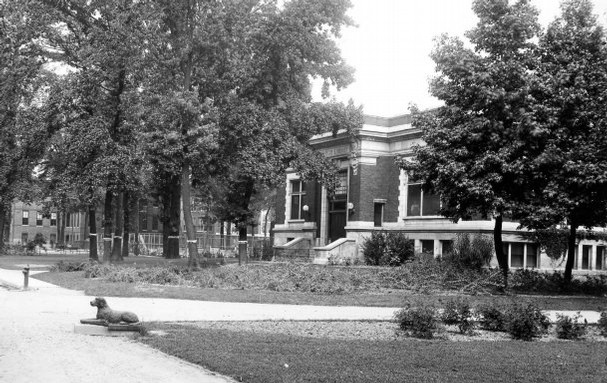
The East Branch Library shortly after it opened in 1913

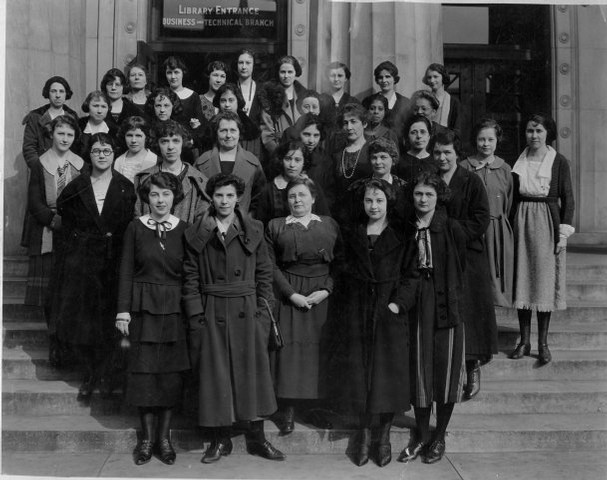
Ethel McCollough, center, poses with library staff on the steps of the Coliseum

== Administration ==
The EVPL is governed by a board of trustees made up of seven members who are appointed as follows: two members by the County Commissioners of Vanderburgh County, two members by the County Council of Vanderburgh County, and three members by the Evansville Vanderburgh School Corporation. EVPL is a municipal corporation with the power and authority to levy taxes. The EVPL also has the authority to approve the tax levy of the independently run and operated Willard Library.

== Gallery ==
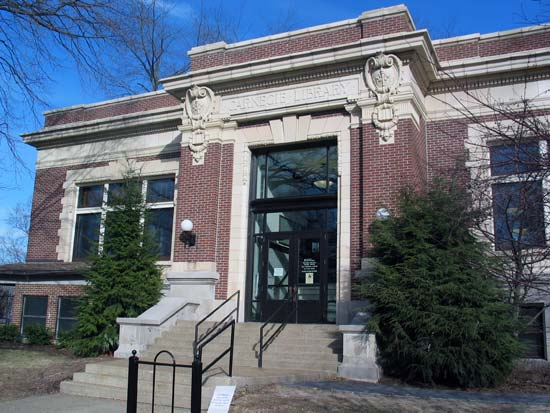
East Branch Library

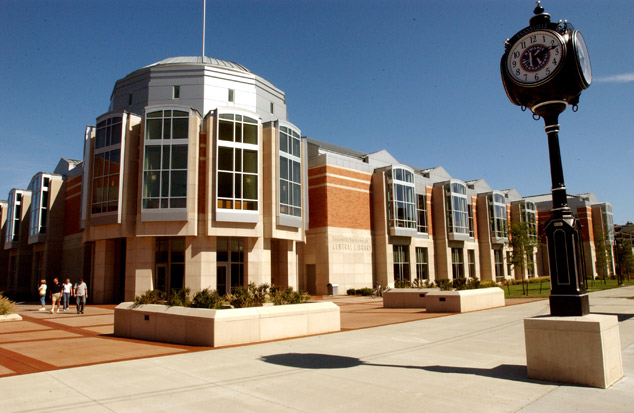
The Central Library in downtown Evansville

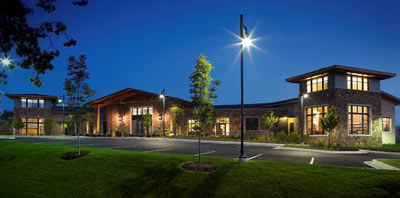
North Park Branch

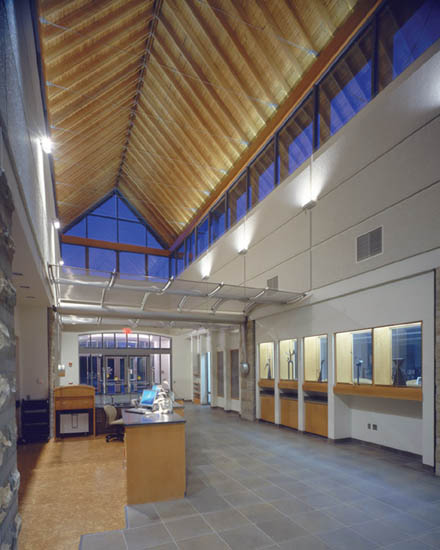
Oaklyn Branch interior lobby

== Resources ==
- Evansville-Vanderburgh Public Libraries website
- EVPL Centennial collection of digitized images and other historical items
