= Kirklin, Indiana =

- Town
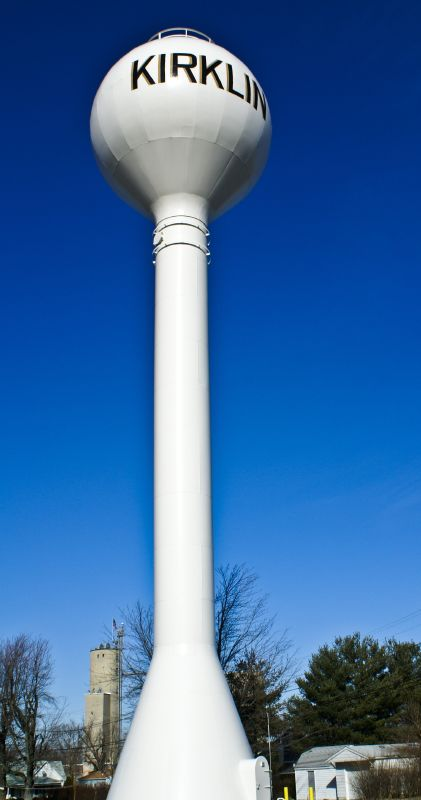
- Kirklin water tower

- Location of Kirklin in Clinton County, Indiana.
- Coordinates: 40°11′34″N 86°21′33″W
- Country: United States
- State: Indiana
- County: Clinton
- Township: Kirklin
- Founded: 1830s
- Incorporated: 1876
- Named for: Nathan Kirk, settler

Area
  - Total: 0.42 sq mi (1.09 km^{2})
  - Land: 0.42 sq mi (1.09 km^{2})
  - Water: 0 sq mi (0.00 km^{2})
- Elevation: 922 ft (281 m)

Population (2020)
  - Total: 710
  - Density: 1,686/sq mi (651.1/km^{2})
- Time zone: UTC-5 (EST)
  - Summer (DST): UTC-5 (EST)
- ZIP code: 46050
- Area code: 765
- FIPS code: 18-39942
- GNIS feature ID: 2396693
- Website: townofkirklin.in.gov

Kirklin is a town in Kirklin Township, Clinton County, Indiana, United States. The population was 710 at the 2020 census. The town was named for Nathan Kirk, a local pioneer settler.

== History ==
Nathan Kirk, the first white settler in eastern Clinton County, laid out the town of Kirklin in the early 1830s, the original plat consisting a row of seven blocks on either side of the Michigan Road (Main Street). An addition filed on October 24, 1836, added blocks to the east, west and south sides of the original plat. Edward Miller established the first general store in a log building and William Wynkoop built the first hotel; other early businesses included Hiram Dougherty's cabinet shop, James Hollcraft's bar, John Heffner's blacksmith shop, Columbus Kemp's tannery and M. Z. Saylor (physician).

A total of 224 residents signed a petition to incorporate Kirklin, and an election held April 1, 1876, unanimously approved incorporation. On June 8, 1876, the county commissioners declared the town of Kirklin incorporated.

In the early 20th century, Kirklin held horse shows and street fairs along its brick-paved Main Street.

Kirklin was also commonly known as Kirk's Cross Roads.

The Kirklin Public Library was listed on the National Register of Historic Places in 1995.

== Geography ==
According to the 2020 census, Kirklin has a total area of 0.42 square miles (1.09 km^{2}), all land.

== Demographics ==
Historical population
Census	Pop.	Note	%±
1850	59		—
1870	141		—
1880	252		78.7%
1890	550		118.3%
1900	624		13.5%
1910	699		12.0%
1920	695		−0.6%
1930	644		−7.3%
1940	712		10.6%
1950	734		3.1%
1960	767		4.5%
1970	736		−4.0%
1980	662		−10.1%
1990	707		6.8%
2000	766		8.3%
2010	788		2.9%
2020	710		−9.9%
U.S. Decennial Census

=== 2010 census ===
As of the census of 2010, there were 788 people, 288 households, and 205 families living in the town. The population density was 2,317.6 inhabitants per square mile (894.8/km^{2}). There were 321 housing units at an average density of 944.1 per square mile (364.5/km^{2}). The racial makeup of the town was 98.5% White, 0.1% African American, 0.1% Asian, 0.5% from other races, and 0.8% from two or more races. Hispanic or Latino of any race were 1.3% of the population.

There were 288 households, of which 42.7% had children under the age of 18 living with them, 51.0% were married couples living together, 10.8% had a female householder with no husband present, 9.4% had a male householder with no wife present, and 28.8% were non-families. 24.0% of all households were made up of individuals, and 10.4% had someone living alone who was 65 years of age or older. The average household size was 2.74 and the average family size was 3.20.

The median age in the town was 34.1 years. 31.1% of residents were under the age of 18; 7.2% were between the ages of 18 and 24; 26.3% were from 25 to 44; 25% were from 45 to 64; and 10.4% were 65 years of age or older. The gender makeup of the town was 49.6% male and 50.4% female.

=== 2000 census ===
As of the census of 2000, there were 766 people, 301 households, and 204 families living in the town. The population density was 2,371.2 inhabitants per square mile (915.5/km^{2}). There were 321 housing units at an average density of 993.7 per square mile (383.7/km^{2}). The racial makeup of the town was 96.61% White, 0.39% Native American, 0.39% Asian, 2.35% from other races, and 0.26% from two or more races. Hispanic or Latino of any race were 2.35% of the population.

There were 301 households, out of which 33.9% had children under the age of 18 living with them, 53.8% were married couples living together, 8.0% had a female householder with no husband present, and 31.9% were non-families. 25.6% of all households were made up of individuals, and 13.6% had someone living alone who was 65 years of age or older. The average household size was 2.54 and the average family size was 3.08.

In the town, the population was spread out, with 27.2% under the age of 18, 7.6% from 18 to 24, 32.0% from 25 to 44, 21.7% from 45 to 64, and 11.6% who were 65 years of age or older. The median age was 35 years. For every 100 females, there were 104.3 males. For every 100 females age 18 and over, there were 91.8 males.

The median income for a household in the town was $39,167, and the median income for a family was $41,000. Males had a median income of $31,976 versus $22,656 for females. The per capita income for the town was $14,633. About 7.4% of families and 12.0% of the population were below the poverty line, including 18.3% of those under age 18 and 4.9% of those age 65 or over.
