= Colfax, Indiana =

- Town
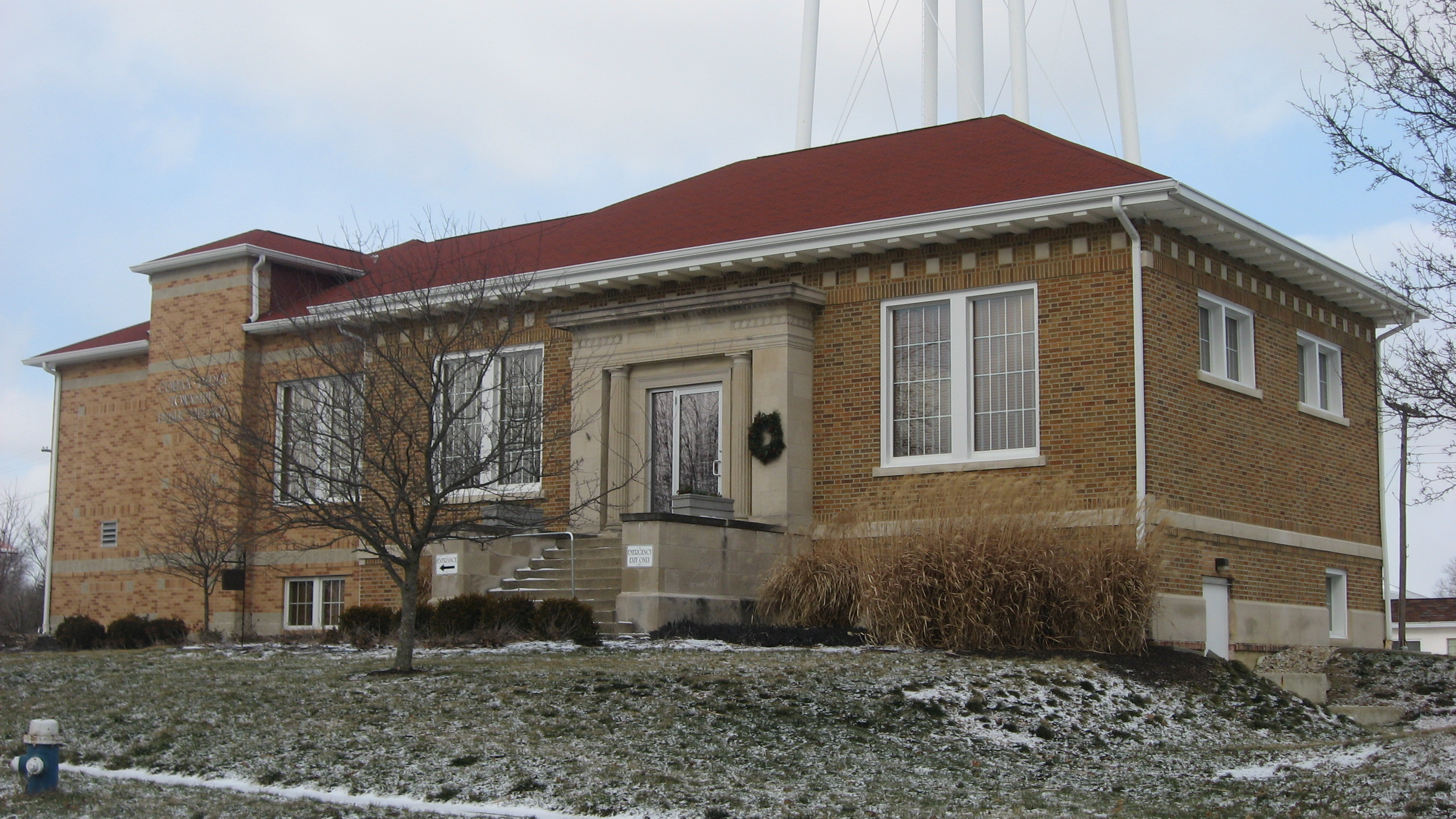
- The Colfax Carnegie Library

- Location of Colfax in Clinton County, Indiana.
- Coordinates: 40°11′39″N 86°40′01″W
- Country: United States
- State: Indiana
- County: Clinton
- Township: Perry
- Founded: 1849
- Named after: Schuyler Colfax

Area
  - Total: 0.37 sq mi (0.96 km^{2})
  - Land: 0.37 sq mi (0.96 km^{2})
  - Water: 0 sq mi (0.00 km^{2})
- Elevation: 843 ft (257 m)

Population (2020)
  - Total: 702
  - Density: 1,898.7/sq mi (733.11/km^{2})
- Time zone: UTC-5 (EST)
  - Summer (DST): UTC-5 (EST)
- ZIP code: 46035
- Area code: 765
- FIPS code: 18-14284
- GNIS feature ID: 2396658

Colfax is a town in Perry Township, Clinton County, Indiana, United States. As of the 2020 census, Colfax had a population of 702. The town was originally known as Midway since it was a halfway point on the IC&L Railroad between Chicago and Louisville. Railways intersected north–south and east–west making Colfax a popular transfer destination. The town was renamed to honor Vice President Schuyler Colfax in 1857.

== History ==
Colfax was laid out in 1849 by Montgomery Stroud. It was originally named Midway for its position between Chicago and Louisville along the IC&L railroad. In 1853 the town gained a post office named Colfax, and in December 1857 the name of the town itself became Colfax, by petition of the residents. By 1861 the town had two churches, two general stores, a hotel, a saw mill and approximately 200 residents.

An incorporation election held December 25, 1869, resulted in 24 yeas and 1 no. The town had 187 residents in 1870, but with the construction of the Vandalia railroad through town in 1870-71 it grew quickly and by 1880 had a population of 638.

The Colfax Carnegie Library and Rosenberger Building are listed on the National Register of Historic Places.

== Geography ==
According to the 2010 census, Colfax has a total area of 0.36 square miles (0.93 km^{2}), all land.

== Demographics ==
Historical population
Census	Pop.	Note	%±
1870	187		—
1880	638		241.2%
1890	730		14.4%
1900	767		5.1%
1910	801		4.4%
1920	793		−1.0%
1930	690		−13.0%
1940	717		3.9%
1950	725		1.1%
1960	725		0.0%
1970	633		−12.7%
1980	823		30.0%
1990	727		−11.7%
2000	768		5.6%
2010	691		−10.0%
2020	702		1.6%
U.S. Decennial Census

=== 2010 census ===
As of the census of 2010, there were 691 people, 268 households, and 194 families living in the town. The population density was 1,919.4 inhabitants per square mile (741.1/km^{2}). There were 322 housing units at an average density of 894.4 per square mile (345.3/km^{2}). The racial makeup of the town was 96.1% White, 0.4% African American, 0.7% Asian, 0.3% from other races, and 2.5% from two or more races. Hispanic or Latino of any race were 3.2% of the population.

There were 268 households, of which 37.3% had children under the age of 18 living with them, 53.7% were married couples living together, 12.3% had a female householder with no husband present, 6.3% had a male householder with no wife present, and 27.6% were non-families. 23.5% of all households were made up of individuals, and 10.1% had someone living alone who was 65 years of age or older. The average household size was 2.58 and the average family size was 3.01.

The median age in the town was 40.1 years. 25.2% of residents were under the age of 18; 7.9% were between the ages of 18 and 24; 25.1% were from 25 to 44; 26.6% were from 45 to 64; and 15.2% were 65 years of age or older. The gender makeup of the town was 47.2% male and 52.8% female.

=== 2000 census ===
As of the census of 2000, there were 768 people, 286 households, and 205 families living in the town. The population density was 2,118.9 inhabitants per square mile (818.1/km^{2}). There were 305 housing units at an average density of 841.5 per square mile (324.9/km^{2}). The racial makeup of the town was 99.87% White and 0.13% Asian. Hispanic or Latino of any race were 1.69% of the population.

There were 286 households, out of which 36.0% had children under the age of 18 living with them, 59.8% were married couples living together, 7.0% had a female householder with no husband present, and 28.3% were non-families. 23.1% of all households were made up of individuals, and 11.9% had someone living alone who was 65 years of age or older. The average household size was 2.69 and the average family size was 3.18.

In the town, the population was spread out, with 29.3% under the age of 18, 7.6% from 18 to 24, 29.7% from 25 to 44, 21.1% from 45 to 64, and 12.4% who were 65 years of age or older. The median age was 34 years. For every 100 females, there were 95.4 males. For every 100 females age 18 and over, there were 93.9 males.

The median income for a household in the town was $42,688, and the median income for a family was $44,514. Males had a median income of $31,792 versus $28,000 for females. The per capita income for the town was $14,482. About 6.7% of families and 7.8% of the population were below the poverty line, including 5.5% of those under age 18 and 10.1% of those age 65 or over.

== Education ==
The town has a free lending library, the Colfax-Perry Township Public Library.
