= South Frankfort Historic District =

Historic district in Indiana, United States

- U.S. National Register of Historic Places
- U.S. Historic district
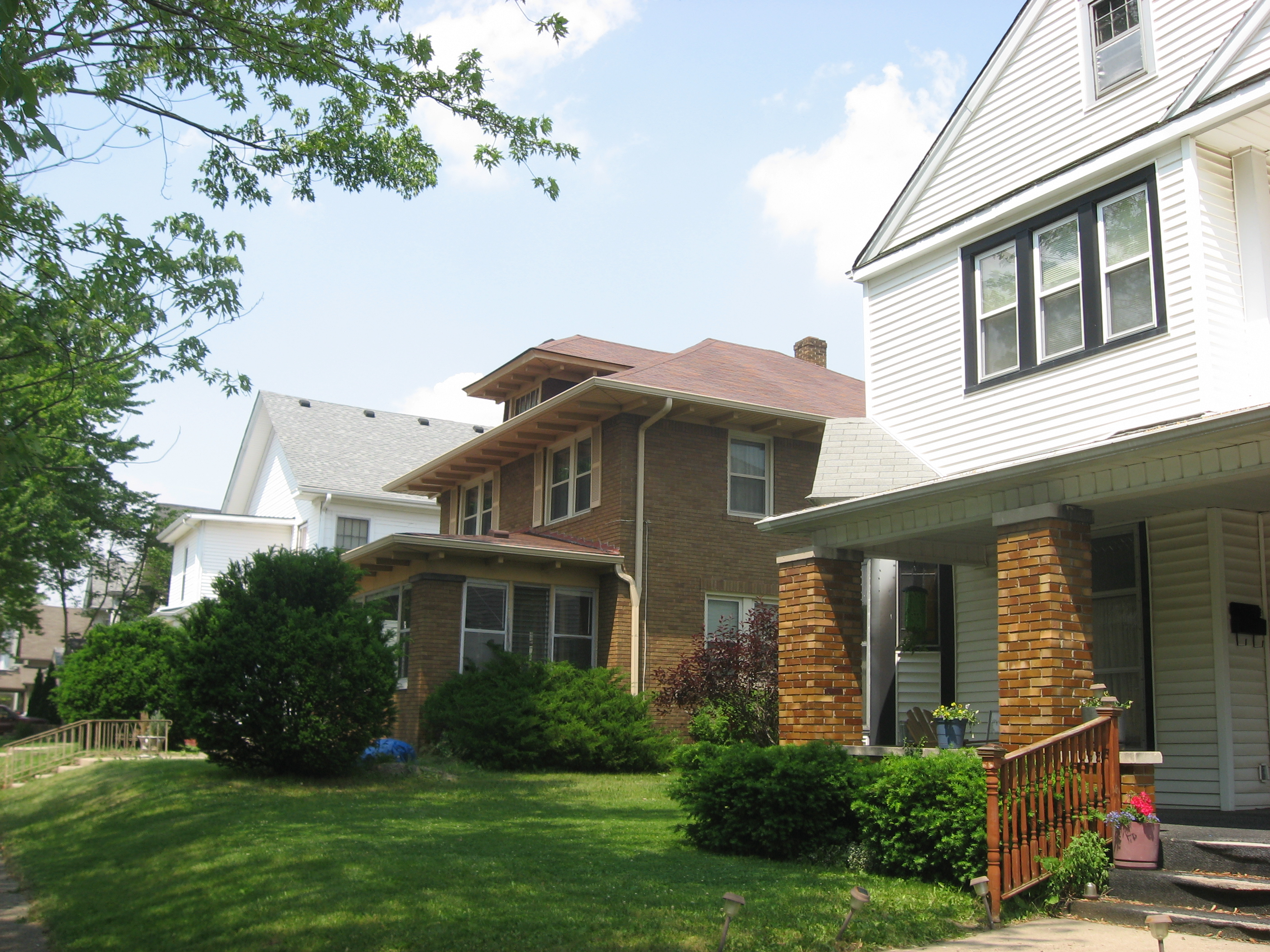
- Houses in the South Frankfort Historic District, June 2011

- Location within Indiana Location within the United States
- Location: Roughly between Walnut St., Prairie Creek, Meredith and Columbia Sts., Frankfort, Indiana
- Coordinates: 40°16′35″N 86°30′40″W
- Area: 36.2 acres (14.6 ha)
- Architectural style: Late 19th And 20th Century Revivals, Late Victorian
- NRHP reference No.: 09000422
- Added to NRHP: June 17, 2009

South Frankfort Historic District is a national historic district located at Frankfort, Indiana. The district encompasses 151 contributing buildings and 1 contributing structures in a predominantly residential section of Frankfort. The district developed between about 1875 and 1940, and includes notable examples of Italianate, Queen Anne, Colonial Revival, and Bungalow / American Craftsman style residential architecture. Notable buildings include the Hammersley Building (c. 1940), First Baptist Church (1912–1913), and Masonic Temple (1912).

It was added to the National Register of Historic Places in 2009.
