= Colfax Carnegie Library =

- U.S. National Register of Historic Places
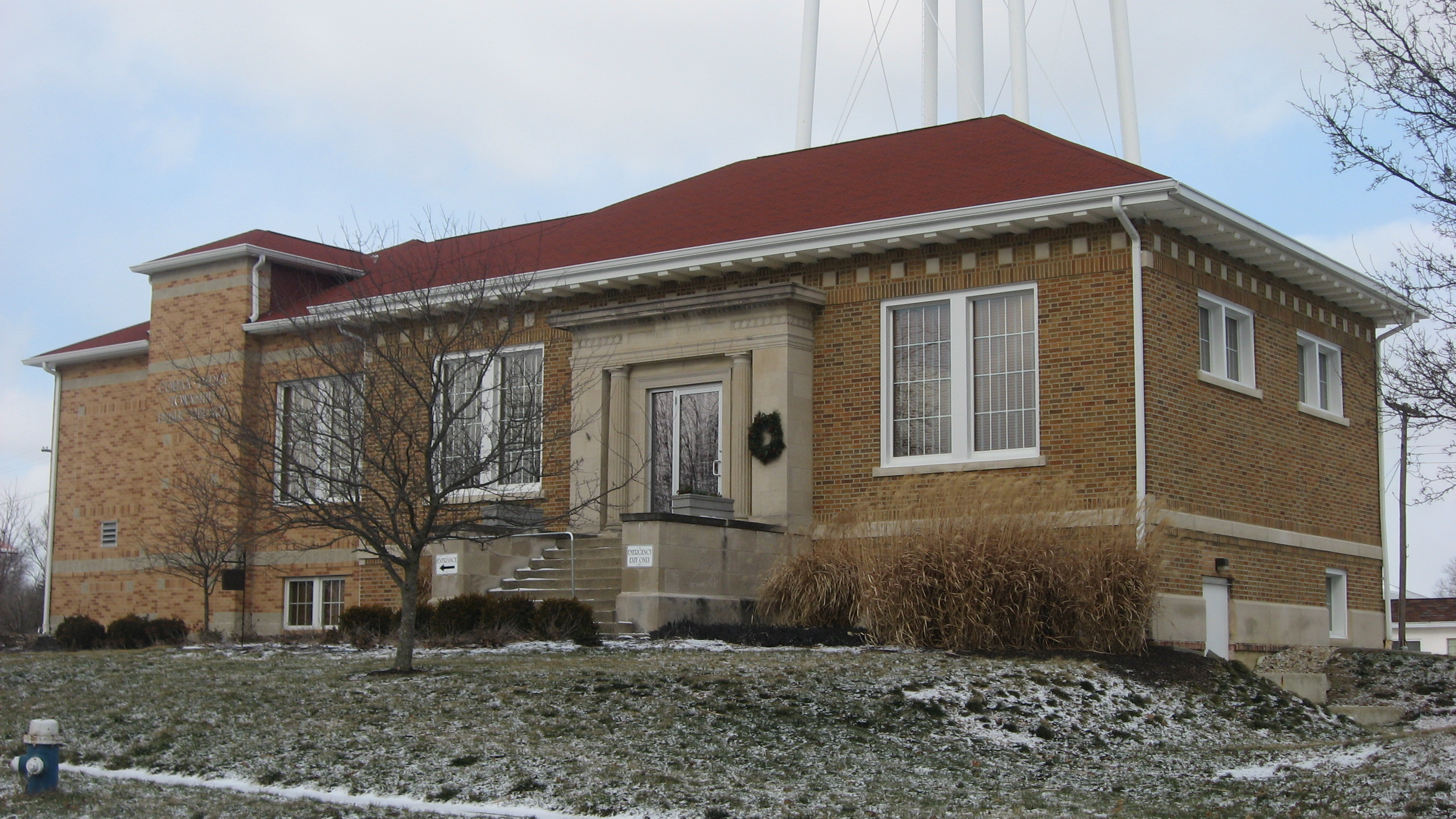
- Front and southern end

- Location within Indiana Location within the United States
- Location: 207 S. Clark St., Colfax, Indiana
- Coordinates: 40°11′36″N 86°39′58″W
- Area: less than one acre
- Built: 1917
- Architect: Gill and Gill; Graham, Donald, et al.
- Architectural style: Classical Revival
- NRHP reference No.: 94000230
- Added to NRHP: March 17, 1994

The Colfax Carnegie Library, also known as Colfax Public Library, is a historic Carnegie library located at Colfax, Indiana. It was built in 1917, and is a 1 1/2-story, Classical Revival style brick building on a raised basement. It features a red terra cotta style hipped roof and decorative frieze. It was built in part with $9,000 provided by the Carnegie Foundation.

It was listed on the National Register of Historic Places in 1994. The historic Carnegie library remains in operation today as a public library; its name has been changed to "Colfax-Perry Township Public Library" to accurately represent its wider service area.
