= List of Indiana townships =

Indiana townships
- Map of the 1,008 townships in Indiana
- Category: Lower-level administrative division
- Location: Indiana
- Created: 1852
- Number: 1,008
- Populations: 52 (Wabash Township) – 156,686 (North Township)
- Areas: 3.9 square miles (10 km^{2}) (Albion Township) – 111.9 square miles (290 km^{2}) (Union Township)
- Government: Township government

The U.S. state of Indiana is divided into 1,008 townships in 92 counties. Each is administered by a township trustee. The population is from the 2010 census unless denoted otherwise.

Township	County	Population
Abington	Wayne	853
Aboite	Allen	35,765
Adams	Allen	31,816
Adams	Carroll	516
Adams	Cass	895
Adams	Decatur	1,944
Adams	Hamilton	4,858
Adams	Madison	3,892
Adams	Morgan	1,194
Adams	Parke	5,825
Adams	Ripley	5,119
Adams	Warren	512
Addison	Shelby	20,585
Albion	Noble	2,456
Allen	Miami	695
Allen	Noble	7,134
Anderson	Madison	56,436
Anderson	Perry	1,557
Anderson	Rush	1,153‡‡
Anderson	Warrick	1,274
Armstrong	Vanderburgh	1,599
Ashland	Morgan	1,720
Aubbeenaubbee	Fulton	1,448
Bainbridge	Dubois	16,020
Baker	Morgan	717
Barkley	Jasper	900
Barr	Daviess	4,811
Barton	Gibson	1,677
Bath	Franklin	369
Baugo	Elkhart	9,431
Bean Blossom	Monroe	2,916
Bearcreek	Jay	1,578
Beaver	Newton	1,573
Beaver	Pulaski	516
Beech Creek	Greene	2,595
Benton	Elkhart	3,200‡‡
Benton	Monroe	3,358
Bethel	Posey	327‡
Bethlehem	Cass	795
Bethlehem	Clark	309
Big Creek	White	819
Bigger	Jennings	726
Black	Posey	10,288‡
Bloomfield	LaGrange	5,412
Blooming Grove	Franklin	1,154
Bloomington	Monroe	44,167
Blue Creek	Adams	1,540‡‡
Blue River	Hancock	1,417
Blue River	Harrison	2,064
Blue River	Henry	1,224
Blue River	Johnson	4,936
Bogard	Daviess	1,473
Bolivar	Benton	1,179‡‡
Bono	Lawrence	833
Boon	Warrick	12,755
Boone	Cass	1,484
Boone	Crawford	175
Boone	Dubois	799
Boone	Harrison	1,391
Boone	Madison	661
Boone	Porter	6,160
Boston	Wayne	887
Bourbon	Marshall	3,152
Brandywine	Hancock	2,392
Brandywine	Shelby	2,015
Brazil	Clay	8,471
Brookville	Franklin	5,773
Brown	Hancock	2,571
Brown	Hendricks	11,593
Brown	Montgomery	1,719
Brown	Morgan	12,973
Brown	Ripley	1,597
Brown	Washington	1,199
Brownstown	Jackson	5,552
Brownsville	Union	845
Buck Creek	Hancock	8,430
Burlington	Carroll	1,742
Busseron	Knox	1,393
Butler	DeKalb	1,691
Butler	Franklin	1,318
Butler	Miami	866
Caesar Creek	Dearborn	238
Cain	Fountain	1,142
California	Starke	2,011
Calumet	Lake	104,258
Campbell	Jennings	1,191
Campbell	Warrick	906
Carpenter	Jasper	1,953
Carr	Clark	4,380‡‡
Carr	Jackson	1,510
Carrollton	Carroll	598
Carter	Spencer	3,258
Cass	Clay	347
Cass	Dubois	2,115
Cass	Greene	358
Cass	LaPorte	1,833
Cass	Ohio	714
Cass	Pulaski	878
Cass	Sullivan	2,074
Cass	White	585
Cedar Creek	Allen	12,570
Cedar Creek	Lake	12,097
Center	Benton	2,715‡‡
Center	Boone	18,030
Center	Clinton	17,245
Center	Dearborn	5,318
Center	Delaware	69,199
Center	Gibson	1,341
Center	Grant	23,406
Center	Greene	3,535
Center	Hancock	25,819
Center	Hendricks	12,167
Center	Howard	45,275
Center	Jennings	8,894
Center	Lake	31,756
Center	LaPorte	25,075
Center	Marion	142,787
Center	Marshall	15,593
Center	Martin	1,654
Center	Porter	43,267
Center	Posey	1,321‡
Center	Ripley	2,657
Center	Rush	780
Center	Starke	6,229
Center	Union	3,048
Center	Vanderburgh	39,007
Center	Wayne	7,579
Centre	St. Joseph	14,236
Charlestown	Clark	13,450
Chester	Wabash	8,009
Chester	Wells	936
Cicero	Tipton	8,086
Clark	Johnson	2,460
Clark	Montgomery	1,841
Clark	Perry	1,180
Clay	Bartholomew	3,271
Clay	Carroll	1,255
Clay	Cass	2,817
Clay	Dearborn	2,966
Clay	Decatur	1,287
Clay	Hamilton	83,293
Clay	Hendricks	2,256
Clay	Howard	3,885
Clay	Kosciusko	1,712
Clay	LaGrange	3,823‡‡
Clay	Miami	844
Clay	Morgan	4,292
Clay	Owen	2,600
Clay	Pike	349
Clay	St. Joseph	39,145‡
Clay	Spencer	2,801
Clay	Wayne	1,169
Clear Creek	Huntington	1,928
Clear Creek	Monroe	5,000
Clear Lake	Steuben	799
Clearspring	LaGrange	4,662‡‡
Cleveland	Elkhart	11,158
Cleveland	Whitley	3,398
Clifty	Bartholomew	1,004
Clinton	Boone	886
Clinton	Cass	816
Clinton	Decatur	513
Clinton	Elkhart	4,870‡‡
Clinton	LaPorte	1,507
Clinton	Putnam	1,275
Clinton	Vermillion	9,119
Cloverdale	Putnam	3,929
Coal Creek	Montgomery	1,544
Colfax	Newton	199
Columbia	Dubois	1,065
Columbia	Fayette	993
Columbia	Gibson	3,830
Columbia	Jennings	868
Columbia	Whitley	11,047
Columbus	Bartholomew	45,578
Concord	DeKalb	1,335
Concord	Elkhart	54,167‡
Connersville	Fayette	12,282
Coolspring	LaPorte	14,718
Cotton	Switzerland	2,040
Craig	Switzerland	900
Curry	Sullivan	3,559
Dallas	Huntington	2,114
Dalton	Wayne	566
Davis	Fountain	682
Davis	Starke	1,043
Decatur	Marion	32,388
Decker	Knox	227
Deer Creek	Carroll	4,571
Deer Creek	Cass	912
Deer Creek	Miami	4,839
Delaware	Delaware	3,603
Delaware	Hamilton	30,617
Delaware	Ripley	1,437
Democrat	Carroll	885
Dewey	LaPorte	935
Dick Johnson	Clay	1,453
Driftwood	Jackson	860
Duck Creek	Madison	548
Dudley	Henry	1,041
Eagle Creek	Lake	1,668
Eagle	Boone	21,977
Eden	LaGrange	4,894‡‡
Eel River	Allen	3,612
Eel River	Hendricks	1,662
Eel	Cass	18,767
Elkhart	Elkhart	36,487
Elkhart	Noble	2,065
Elmore	Daviess	1,113
Erie	Miami	554
Ervin	Howard	2,227
Etna	Kosciusko	1,503
Etna-Troy	Whitley	1,889
Eugene	Vermillion	2,025
Fairbanks	Sullivan	733
Fairfield	DeKalb	1,368
Fairfield	Franklin	537
Fairfield	Tippecanoe	51,113
Fairmount	Grant	4,239
Fairplay	Greene	575
Fairview	Fayette	347
Fall Creek	Hamilton	51,613
Fall Creek	Henry	4,612
Fall Creek	Madison	14,695
Fayette	Vigo	2,630
Ferdinand	Dubois	3,629
Finley	Scott	1,469
Flat Rock	Bartholomew	1,574
Florida	Parke	2,378
Floyd	Putnam	4,011
Forest	Clinton	760
Franklin	DeKalb	1,182
Franklin	Floyd	1,499
Franklin	Grant	7,211
Franklin	Harrison	4,104
Franklin	Hendricks	1,297
Franklin	Henry	1,157
Franklin	Johnson	20,685
Franklin	Kosciusko	1,127
Franklin	Marion	65,788‡‡
Franklin	Montgomery	1,915
Franklin	Owen	1,269
Franklin	Pulaski	715
Franklin	Putnam	1,690
Franklin	Randolph	1,265
Franklin	Ripley	3,773
Franklin	Washington	2,301
Franklin	Wayne	1,370
Fremont	Steuben	2,993
French Lick	Orange	4,699
French	Adams	1,083
Fugit	Decatur	1,767
Fulton	Fountain	674‡
Galena	LaPorte	1,899
Geneva	Jennings	7,584
Georgetown	Floyd	9,632
German	Bartholomew	7,093
German	Marshall	8,902
German	St. Joseph	8,518‡
German	Vanderburgh	7,441
Gibson	Washington	1,176
Gilboa	Benton	282‡‡
Gill	Sullivan	871
Gillam	Jasper	640
Graham	Jefferson	1,668
Grant	Benton	1,085‡‡
Grant	DeKalb	3,245
Grant	Greene	739
Grant	Newton	1,189
Grass	Spencer	1,241
Grassy Fork	Jackson	668
Green	Grant	500
Green	Hancock	1,662
Green	Madison	7,537
Green	Marshall	1,103
Green	Morgan	3,520
Green	Noble	2,123
Green	Randolph	957
Green	Wayne	1,222
Greencastle	Putnam	13,136
Greene	Jay	989
Greene	Parke	423
Greene	St. Joseph	3,040‡
Greenfield	LaGrange	1,276
Greenfield	Orange	730
Greensboro	Henry	1,728
Greensfork	Randolph	1,082
Greenville	Floyd	6,746
Greer	Warrick	1,883
Gregg	Morgan	2,930
Guilford	Hendricks	27,844
Guthrie	Lawrence	1,383
Haddon	Sullivan	3,987
Halbert	Martin	1,631
Hall	Dubois	1,281
Hamblen	Brown	4,336
Hamilton	Delaware	7,206
Hamilton	Jackson	1,660
Hamilton	Sullivan	6,869
Hammond	Spencer	1,727
Hanging Grove	Jasper	230
Hanna	LaPorte	965
Hanover	Jefferson	5,366
Hanover	Lake	12,443
Hanover	Shelby	2,283
Harbison	Dubois	1,588
Harmony	Posey	1,473‡
Harmony	Union	543
Harris	St. Joseph	19,873‡
Harrison	Bartholomew	3,823
Harrison	Blackford	2,640
Harrison	Boone	704
Harrison	Cass	802
Harrison	Clay	2,172
Harrison	Daviess	696
Harrison	Dearborn	3,204
Harrison	Delaware	3,463‡‡
Harrison	Elkhart	4,435
Harrison	Fayette	6,450
Harrison	Harrison	12,484
Harrison	Henry	1,352
Harrison	Howard	9,489
Harrison	Knox	1,916
Harrison	Kosciusko	3,587
Harrison	Miami	759
Harrison	Morgan	1,522
Harrison	Owen	444
Harrison	Pulaski	628
Harrison	Spencer	2,000
Harrison	Union	416
Harrison	Vigo	51,272
Harrison	Wayne	392
Harrison	Wells	8,531
Hart	Warrick	1,626
Hartford	Adams	872
Haw Creek	Bartholomew	3,905
Helt	Vermillion	2,610
Hendricks	Shelby	1,286
Henry	Fulton	3,048
Henry	Henry	22,560
Hensley	Johnson	3,329
Heth	Harrison	1,278
Hickory Grove	Benton	398‡‡
Highland	Franklin	1,412
Highland	Greene	718
Highland	Vermillion	1,534
Hobart	Lake	39,417
Hogan	Dearborn	1,178
Honey Creek	Howard	2,109
Honey Creek	Vigo	17,179
Honey Creek	White	1,162
Howard	Howard	2,579
Howard	Parke	341
Howard	Washington	1,262
Hudson	LaPorte	1,883
Huff	Spencer	1,156
Huntington	Huntington	20,326‡‡
Indian Creek	Lawrence	2,736‡‡
Indian Creek	Monroe	1,634
Indian Creek	Pulaski	691
Iroquois	Newton	1,358
Jackson	Allen	504
Jackson	Bartholomew	949
Jackson	Blackford	1,354
Jackson	Boone	2,731
Jackson	Brown	4,002
Jackson	Carroll	1,391
Jackson	Cass	2,876
Jackson	Clay	2,739
Jackson	Clinton	1,173
Jackson	Dearborn	1,705
Jackson	Decatur	988
Jackson	DeKalb	3,064
Jackson	Dubois	2,125
Jackson	Elkhart	4,288
Jackson	Fayette	1,524
Jackson	Fountain	628
Jackson	Greene	1,947
Jackson	Hamilton	10,368
Jackson	Hancock	1,786
Jackson	Harrison	6,042
Jackson	Howard	596
Jackson	Huntington	4,043
Jackson	Jackson	20,042
Jackson	Jay	965
Jackson	Kosciusko	1,238
Jackson	Madison	1,904
Jackson	Miami	1,966‡‡
Jackson	Morgan	3,439
Jackson	Newton	382
Jackson	Orange	686
Jackson	Owen	1,735
Jackson	Parke	737
Jackson	Porter	5,328
Jackson	Putnam	854
Jackson	Randolph	619
Jackson	Ripley	965
Jackson	Rush	366
Jackson	Shelby	1,844
Jackson	Spencer	891
Jackson	Starke	549
Jackson	Steuben	1,777
Jackson	Sullivan	1,904
Jackson	Tippecanoe	499
Jackson	Washington	2,116
Jackson	Wayne	4,660
Jackson	Wells	837
Jackson	White	655
Jamestown	Steuben	3,249
Jefferson	Adams	1,363‡‡
Jefferson	Allen	2,109
Jefferson	Boone	1,464
Jefferson	Carroll	2,162
Jefferson	Cass	1,452
Jefferson	Dubois	1,543
Jefferson	Elkhart	9,688
Jefferson	Grant	5,839
Jefferson	Greene	2,094
Jefferson	Henry	1,504
Jefferson	Huntington	757
Jefferson	Jay	770
Jefferson	Kosciusko	2,040
Jefferson	Miami	2,412
Jefferson	Morgan	3,274
Jefferson	Newton	2,140
Jefferson	Noble	1,604
Jefferson	Owen	1,129
Jefferson	Pike	1,814
Jefferson	Pulaski	545
Jefferson	Putnam	1,252
Jefferson	Sullivan	417
Jefferson	Switzerland	3,167
Jefferson	Tipton	1,422
Jefferson	Washington	920
Jefferson	Wayne	3,482
Jefferson	Wells	5,762
Jefferson	Whitley	2,182
Jeffersonville	Clark	59,062
Jennings	Crawford	1,436
Jennings	Fayette	830
Jennings	Owen	846
Jennings	Scott	6,633
Johnson	Clinton	511
Johnson	Crawford	484
Johnson	Gibson	4,094
Johnson	Knox	1,382
Johnson	LaGrange	3,392
Johnson	LaPorte	198
Johnson	Ripley	3,685
Johnson	Scott	2,520
Jordan	Jasper	355
Jordan	Warren	247
Kankakee	Jasper	988
Kankakee	LaPorte	4,830
Keener	Jasper	10,110
Kelso	Dearborn	2,341
Kent	Warren	428
Keyser	DeKalb	7,666
Kirkland	Adams	929
Kirklin	Clinton	1,380
Knight	Vanderburgh	67,945
Knox	Jay	503
Lafayette	Allen	3,354
Lafayette	Floyd	7,449
Lafayette	Madison	5,275
Lafayette	Owen	1,207
Lagro	Wabash	2,894
Lake	Allen	2,301
Lake	Kosciusko	1,588
Lake	Newton	2,384
Lancaster	Huntington	1,150
Lancaster	Jefferson	1,511
Lancaster	Wells	5,705
Lane	Warrick	281
Laughery	Ripley	4,736
Lauramie	Tippecanoe	2,596
Laurel	Franklin	1,634
Lawrence	Marion	118,447
Lawrenceburg	Dearborn	10,985
Leopold	Perry	765
Lewis	Clay	1,464
Lexington	Scott	3,551
Liberty	Carroll	440
Liberty	Crawford	1,990
Liberty	Delaware	4,685
Liberty	Fulton	1,614
Liberty	Grant	1,028
Liberty	Hendricks	5,772
Liberty	Henry	1,455
Liberty	Howard	4,862
Liberty	Parke	739
Liberty	Porter	9,319
Liberty	St. Joseph	3,053‡
Liberty	Shelby	1,772
Liberty	Tipton	2,471
Liberty	Union	1,042
Liberty	Wabash	2,365
Liberty	Warren	896
Liberty	Wells	1,086
Liberty	White	2,223
Licking	Blackford	7,899
Lima	LaGrange	2,507
Lincoln	Hendricks	28,665
Lincoln	LaPorte	1,794
Lincoln	Newton	4,480
Lincoln	St. Joseph	3,053‡
Lincoln	White	638
Linton	Vigo	1,323
Locke	Elkhart	3,913
Lockhart	Pike	907
Logan	Dearborn	3,541
Logan	Fountain	3,672
Logan	Pike	474
Lost Creek	Vigo	10,497
Lost River	Martin	572
Lovett	Jennings	1,160
Luce	Spencer	2,572
Lynn	Posey	945‡
Madison	Allen	1,771
Madison	Carroll	433
Madison	Clinton	2,079
Madison	Daviess	2,840
Madison	Dubois	2,696
Madison	Jay	656
Madison	Jefferson	17,415
Madison	Montgomery	1,272
Madison	Morgan	9,705
Madison	Pike	382
Madison	Putnam	1,028
Madison	St. Joseph	1,770‡
Madison	Tipton	1,396
Madison	Washington	705
Manchester	Dearborn	3,215
Marion	Allen	3,858
Marion	Boone	1,233
Marion	Decatur	1,638
Marion	Dubois	1,501
Marion	Hendricks	1,402
Marion	Jasper	7,571
Marion	Jennings	1,117
Marion	Lawrence	9,449
Marion	Owen	916
Marion	Pike	724
Marion	Putnam	1,974
Marion	Shelby	1,923
Marrs	Posey	4,868‡
Marshall	Lawrence	4,660
Maumee	Allen	2,620
McClellan	Newton	217
Medina	Warren	457
Metamora	Franklin	974
Miami	Cass	1,292
Michigan	Clinton	1,649
Michigan	LaPorte	27,522
Middle	Hendricks	6,170
Middlebury	Elkhart	8,498‡
Milan	Allen	3,749
Milford	LaGrange	2,868
Mill	Grant	10,882
Millcreek	Fountain	1,406
Miller	Dearborn	9,810
Millgrove	Steuben	1,577
Milroy	Jasper	276
Milton	Jefferson	896
Mitcheltree	Martin	624
Monon	White	3,282
Monroe	Adams	4,858
Monroe	Allen	1,927
Monroe	Carroll	2,797
Monroe	Clark	5,402
Monroe	Delaware	3,729
Monroe	Grant	1,677
Monroe	Howard	1,407
Monroe	Jefferson	374
Monroe	Kosciusko	1,147
Monroe	Madison	8,786
Monroe	Morgan	4,904
Monroe	Pike	673
Monroe	Pulaski	4,019
Monroe	Putnam	1,569
Monroe	Randolph	3,711
Monroe	Washington	558
Montgomery	Gibson	3,996
Montgomery	Jennings	978
Montgomery	Owen	1,304
Moral	Shelby	4,577
Morgan	Harrison	4,153
Morgan	Owen	1,237
Morgan	Porter	3,684
Mound	Warren	418
Mount Pleasant	Delaware	14,102
Needham	Johnson	6,511
Nevins	Vigo	1,975
New Albany	Floyd	49,252
New Durham	LaPorte	8,664
New Garden	Wayne	1,977
Newbury	LaGrange	5,792‡‡
Newcastle	Fulton	1,398
Newton	Jasper	811
Newville	DeKalb	558
Niles	Delaware	1,360
Nineveh	Johnson	3,987
Noble	Cass	1,960
Noble	Jay	640
Noble	LaPorte	1,625
Noble	Noble	3,094
Noble	Rush	630
Noble	Shelby	1,486
Noble	Wabash	14,230
Noblesville	Hamilton	50,564
North Bend	Starke	1,394
North	Lake	162,855
North	Marshall	4,321
Northeast	Orange	549
Northwest	Orange	375
Nottingham	Wells	1,062
Oak Grove	Benton	1,551‡‡
Ohio	Bartholomew	1,787
Ohio	Crawford	742
Ohio	Spencer	5,306
Ohio	Warrick	37,749
Oil	Perry	2,546
Olive	Elkhart	3,068
Olive	St. Joseph	3,914‡
Orange	Fayette	736
Orange	Noble	3,911
Orange	Rush	796
Orangeville	Orange	658
Oregon	Clark	1,769
Oregon	Starke	3,367
Orleans	Orange	3,555
Osolo	Elkhart	28,032
Otsego	Steuben	2,575
Otter Creek	Ripley	1,410
Otter Creek	Vigo	9,069
Owen	Clark	958
Owen	Clinton	930
Owen	Jackson	1,572
Owen	Warrick	611
Palmyra	Knox	1,466
Paoli	Orange	6,031
Parish Grove	Benton	185‡‡
Patoka	Crawford	1,579
Patoka	Dubois	7,527
Patoka	Gibson	11,864
Patoka	Pike	3,062
Paw Paw	Wabash	1,691
Penn	Jay	1,239
Penn	Parke	810
Penn	St. Joseph	64,322‡
Perry	Allen	29,158
Perry	Boone	1,163
Perry	Clay	934
Perry	Clinton	1,459
Perry	Delaware	1,511
Perry	Lawrence	2,259
Perry	Marion	108,972
Perry	Martin	5,093
Perry	Miami	864
Perry	Monroe	50,673
Perry	Noble	6,761
Perry	Tippecanoe	7,161
Perry	Vanderburgh	25,092
Perry	Wayne	835
Pershing	Jackson	1,394
Peru	Miami	10,638‡‡
Pierce	Washington	2,666
Pierson	Vigo	1,210
Pigeon	Vanderburgh	29,799
Pigeon	Warrick	979
Pike	Jay	899
Pike	Marion	77,895
Pike	Ohio	527
Pike	Warren	1,221
Pine	Benton	324‡‡
Pine	Porter	2,709
Pine	Warren	481
Pipe Creek	Madison	12,497
Pipe Creek	Miami	6,294
Plain	Kosciusko	7,698
Pleasant Run	Lawrence	1,883
Pleasant	Allen	3,312
Pleasant	Grant	6,797
Pleasant	Johnson	52,957
Pleasant	LaPorte	3,380
Pleasant	Porter	4,432
Pleasant	Steuben	13,704
Pleasant	Switzerland	1,521
Pleasant	Wabash	2,412
Point	Posey	497‡
Polk	Huntington	464‡‡
Polk	Marshall	2,824
Polk	Monroe	360
Polk	Washington	2,626
Portage	Porter	47,085
Portage	St. Joseph	94,916‡
Porter	Porter	9,367
Posey	Clay	4,063
Posey	Fayette	508
Posey	Franklin	1,051
Posey	Harrison	2,909
Posey	Rush	1,083
Posey	Switzerland	1,779
Posey	Washington	1,888
Prairie Creek	Vigo	1,195
Prairie	Henry	5,517
Prairie	Kosciusko	1,651
Prairie	LaPorte	209
Prairie	Tipton	1,140
Prairie	Warren	257
Prairie	White	3,180
Prairieton	Vigo	1,222
Preble	Adams	1,069
Princeton	White	1,553
Raccoon	Parke	659
Railroad	Starke	1,226
Randolph	Ohio	4,383
Randolph	Tippecanoe	931
Ray	Franklin	4,021
Ray	Morgan	1,631
Redding	Jackson	4,233
Reeve	Daviess	631
Republican	Jefferson	1,599
Reserve	Parke	1,423
Rich Grove	Pulaski	921
Richland	Benton	562‡‡
Richland	DeKalb	1,333
Richland	Fountain	950
Richland	Fulton	1,181
Richland	Grant	966
Richland	Greene	5,019
Richland	Jay	4,518
Richland	Madison	4,775
Richland	Miami	1,179
Richland	Monroe	15,098‡‡
Richland	Rush	337
Richland	Steuben	570
Richland	Whitley	1,758
Riley	Vigo	3,123
Ripley	Montgomery	977
Ripley	Rush	2,156
Robb	Posey	2,074‡
Robinson	Posey	3,976‡
Rochester	Fulton	10,181
Rock Creek	Bartholomew	1,424
Rock Creek	Carroll	475
Rock Creek	Huntington	1,272‡‡
Rockcreek	Wells	1,579
Root	Adams	4,443
Ross	Clinton	2,898
Ross	Lake	47,890
Round Grove	White	259
Rushville	Rush	7,897
Russell	Putnam	823
Rutherford	Martin	760
Salamonie	Huntington	2,260‡‡
Salem	Delaware	4,034
Salem	Pulaski	1,399
Salem	Steuben	2,262
Salt Creek	Decatur	1,179
Salt Creek	Franklin	1,004
Salt Creek	Jackson	344
Salt Creek	Monroe	1,513
Saluda	Jefferson	1,370
Sand Creek	Bartholomew	2,390
Sand Creek	Decatur	3,120
Sand Creek	Jennings	872
Scipio	Allen	414
Scipio	LaPorte	4,570
Scott	Kosciusko	1,696
Scott	Montgomery	837
Scott	Steuben	1,111
Scott	Vanderburgh	8,528
Seward	Kosciusko	2,567
Shawnee	Fountain	672
Shawswick	Lawrence	20,469
Sheffield	Tippecanoe	3,865
Shelby	Jefferson	1,133
Shelby	Ripley	999
Shelby	Shelby	1,892
Shelby	Tippecanoe	2,352
Silver Creek	Clark	11,858
Sims	Grant	1,779
Skelton	Warrick	1,625
Smith	Greene	383
Smith	Posey	1,292‡
Smith	Whitley	5,327
Smithfield	DeKalb	1,613
Smyrna	Jefferson	1,096
Southeast	Orange	1,603
Sparta	Dearborn	2,894
Sparta	Noble	2,924
Spencer	DeKalb	1,233
Spencer	Harrison	1,855
Spencer	Jennings	2,326
Spice Valley	Lawrence	2,423
Spiceland	Henry	2,279
Springfield	Allen	4,349
Springfield	Franklin	1,156
Springfield	LaGrange	1,179
Springfield	LaPorte	4,045
St. John	Lake	66,741
St. Joseph	Allen	72,245
St. Marys	Adams	1,308
Stafford	DeKalb	283
Stafford	Greene	448
Stampers Creek	Orange	954
Steele	Daviess	903
Steen	Knox	900
Sterling	Crawford	1,635
Steuben	Steuben	2,835
Steuben	Warren	487
Stockton	Greene	8,447
Stoney Creek	Henry	817
Stoney Creek	Randolph	990
Stony Creek	Madison	3,871
Sugar Creek	Boone	2,243
Sugar Creek	Clinton	450
Sugar Creek	Hancock	14,920
Sugar Creek	Montgomery	448
Sugar Creek	Parke	322
Sugar Creek	Shelby	1,086
Sugar Creek	Vigo	7,153
Sugar Ridge	Clay	939
Swan	Noble	2,399
Taylor	Greene	1,200
Taylor	Harrison	781
Taylor	Howard	9,294
Taylor	Owen	1,020
Thorncreek	Whitley	4,166
Tippecanoe	Carroll	2,341
Tippecanoe	Kosciusko	6,661
Tippecanoe	Marshall	1,313
Tippecanoe	Pulaski	1,104
Tippecanoe	Tippecanoe	7,702
Tipton	Cass	2,490
Tobin	Perry	768
Troy	DeKalb	304
Troy	Fountain	3,711
Troy	Perry	11,965
Turkey Creek	Kosciusko	8,428
Turman	Sullivan	1,061
Union	Adams	922
Union	Benton	283‡‡
Union	Boone	2,357
Union	Clark	3,507
Union	Clinton	973
Union	Crawford	761
Union	DeKalb	13,220
Union	Delaware	2,838
Union	Elkhart	6,134
Union	Fulton	1,397
Union	Gibson	4,197
Union	Hendricks	1,856
Union	Howard	1,029
Union	Huntington	1,205‡‡
Union	Jasper	1,586
Union	Johnson	2,689
Union	LaPorte	2,348
Union	Madison	8,898
Union	Marshall	3,088
Union	Miami	857
Union	Montgomery	24,587
Union	Ohio	504
Union	Parke	1,562
Union	Perry	557
Union	Porter	8,811
Union	Randolph	2,142
Union	Rush	765
Union	St. Joseph	3,289‡
Union	Shelby	970
Union	Tippecanoe	1,610
Union	Union	1,622
Union	Vanderburgh	292
Union	Wells	2,138
Union	White	9,906
Union	Whitley	2,244
Utica	Clark	6,016
Van Buren	Brown	2,008
Van Buren	Clay	3,528
Van Buren	Daviess	2,552
Van Buren	Fountain	2,972
Van Buren	Grant	1,924
Van Buren	Kosciusko	4,168
Van Buren	LaGrange	4,208‡‡
Van Buren	Madison	1,861
Van Buren	Monroe	11,981
Van Buren	Pulaski	911
Van Buren	Shelby	1,480
Veale	Daviess	1,095
Vermillion	Vermillion	924
Vernon	Hancock	11,005
Vernon	Jackson	3,429
Vernon	Jennings	2,809
Vernon	Washington	669
Vienna	Scott	10,008
Vigo	Knox	4,031
Vincennes	Knox	23,707
Wabash	Adams	6223
Wabash	Fountain	783
Wabash	Gibson	30
Wabash	Jay	578
Wabash	Parke	818
Wabash	Tippecanoe	59,279
Walker	Jasper	3,663
Walker	Rush	856
Walnut	Marshall	2,747
Walnut	Montgomery	1,394
Waltz	Wabash	1,287
Ward	Randolph	1,109
Warren	Clinton	619
Warren	Huntington	641‡‡
Warren	Marion	99,433
Warren	Putnam	3,929
Warren	St. Joseph	6,430‡
Warren	Warren	806
Washington	Adams	10,151
Washington	Allen	36,092
Washington	Blackford	873
Washington	Boone	1,398
Washington	Brown	4,896
Washington	Carroll	549
Washington	Cass	1,608
Washington	Clark	1,702
Washington	Clay	780
Washington	Clinton	1,098
Washington	Daviess	15,534
Washington	Dearborn	1,431
Washington	Decatur	13,304
Washington	Delaware	1,849‡‡
Washington	Elkhart	6,945‡
Washington	Gibson	785
Washington	Grant	3,803
Washington	Greene	1,186
Washington	Harrison	522
Washington	Hendricks	44,764
Washington	Jackson	1,122
Washington	Knox	2,286
Washington	Kosciusko	2,996
Washington	LaPorte	1,357
Washington	Marion	132,049
Washington	Miami	3,493
Washington	Monroe	2,029
Washington	Morgan	17,073
Washington	Newton	322
Washington	Noble	1,200
Washington	Owen	6,164
Washington	Parke	1,302
Washington	Pike	4,460
Washington	Porter	4,785
Washington	Putnam	2,493
Washington	Randolph	2,172
Washington	Ripley	2,440
Washington	Rush	475
Washington	Shelby	1,237
Washington	Starke	3,003
Washington	Tippecanoe	2,432
Washington	Warren	2,298
Washington	Washington	10,176
Washington	Wayne	1,436
Washington	Whitley	1,281
Waterloo	Fayette	607
Wayne	Allen	103,803
Wayne	Bartholomew	3,815
Wayne	Fulton	569
Wayne	Hamilton	7,886
Wayne	Henry	4,126
Wayne	Huntington	470‡‡
Wayne	Jay	7,918
Wayne	Kosciusko	27,551
Wayne	Marion	136,828
Wayne	Montgomery	1,590
Wayne	Noble	10,260
Wayne	Owen	1,704
Wayne	Randolph	4,611
Wayne	Starke	4,541
Wayne	Tippecanoe	1,580
Wayne	Wayne	41,217
Wea	Tippecanoe	31,660
Webster	Harrison	1,781
Webster	Wayne	1,272
West Creek	Lake	6,826
West Point	White	381
West	Marshall	4,008
Westchester	Porter	19,396
Westfield Washington	Hamilton	32,884
Wheatfield	Jasper	4,395
Whiskey Run	Crawford	1,911
White Post	Pulaski	1,075
White River	Gibson	1,689
White River	Hamilton	2,486
White River	Johnson	42,100
White River	Randolph	7,513
Whitewater	Franklin	2,684
Widner	Knox	1,132
Wildcat	Tipton	1,421
Wills	LaPorte	2,110
Wilmington	DeKalb	4,128
Winfield	Lake	10,054
Wood	Clark	2,747
Worth	Boone	2,454
Wright	Greene	3,921
York	Benton	155‡‡
York	Dearborn	1,221
York	Elkhart	3,728‡
York	Noble	1,605
York	Steuben	733
York	Switzerland	1206

== See also ==
- Indiana
- List of cities in Indiana
- List of towns in Indiana
- List of Indiana counties

== Notes ==
‡ denotes the 2000 census

‡‡ denotes the 2020 census
