= Benton Community School Corporation =

School district in Indiana, United States

The Benton Community School Corporation administers the one high school/middle school and two elementary schools in Benton County, Indiana. Its offices are located in the county seat of Fowler, Indiana. The superintendent is Dr. Annette Zupin. The corporation covers more land area (447 square miles (1,160 km^{2})) than any other single school corporation in the state.

== History ==
In the fall of 2006, the students of Fowler Elementary School and Oxford Elementary School began attending a new consolidated school named Prairie Crossing located in Oxford. In the fall of 2021 students from the former Boswell Elementary began attending Prairie Crossing as well.

== Boundary ==
The district includes the majority of Benton County, where it includes Bolivar, Center, Grant, Hickory Grove, Oak Grove, Parish Grove, Pine, Richland, and Union townships. In that county, it covers Fowler, Ambia, Boswell, Earl Park, Oxford, Templeton, and that county's portion of Otterbein. It extends into a large portion of Shelby Township, Tippecanoe County, where it includes Montmorenci and that county's portion of Otterbein, and Warren County, where it covers Medina and Prairie townships and a portion of Warren Township. In the latter county, the district includes Green Hill and Tab.

== Schools ==
- Benton Central Junior-Senior High School
- Otterbein Elementary
- Prairie Crossing Elementary School
  - It was created in 2006 as a consolidation of the Fowler and Oxford elementary schools.

Former schools:

- Boswell Elementary School (closed at end of May 2021)
- Fowler Elementary School (closed 2006)
- Oxford Elementary School (closed 2006)
