= Wadena, Indiana =

Unincorporated community in Indiana, US

- Unincorporated community
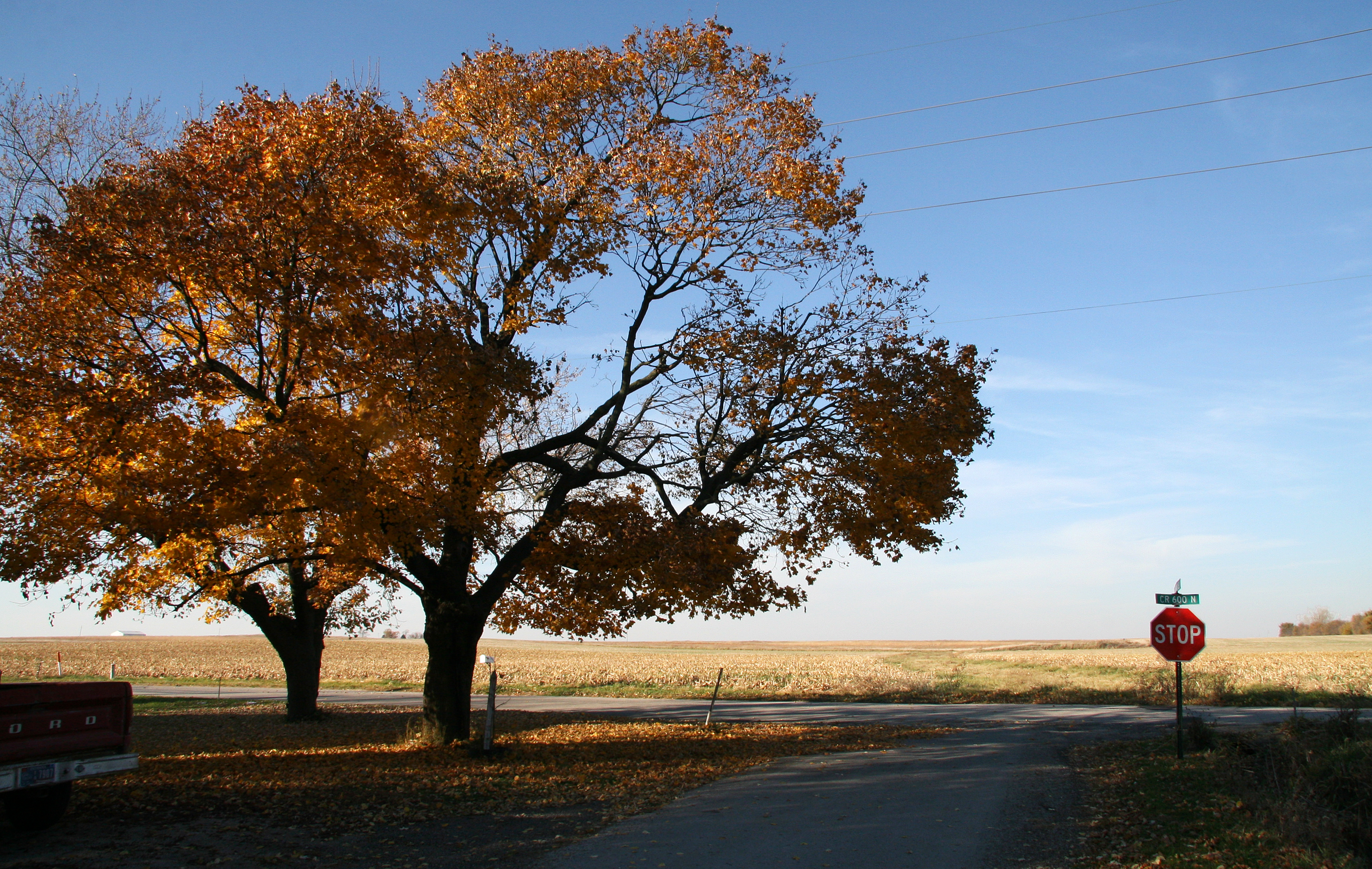
- A street corner in the small town of Wadena

- Benton County's location in Indiana

- Freeland Park's location in Benton County
- Coordinates: 40°41′36″N 87°16′36″W
- Country: United States
- State: Indiana
- County: Benton
- Township: Union
- Established: 1884
- Founded by: John Swan
- Named after: Wadena, Minnesota
- Elevation: 797 ft (243 m)
- Time zone: UTC-5 (Eastern (EST))
  - Summer (DST): UTC-4 (EDT)
- ZIP code: 47944
- Area code: 765
- FIPS code: 18-79424
- GNIS feature ID: 445342

Wadena (/wəˈdinə/ wuh-DEE-nuh) is an unincorporated community in Union Township, Benton County, in the U.S. state of Indiana. It is part of the Lafayette, Indiana Metropolitan Statistical Area.

== History ==
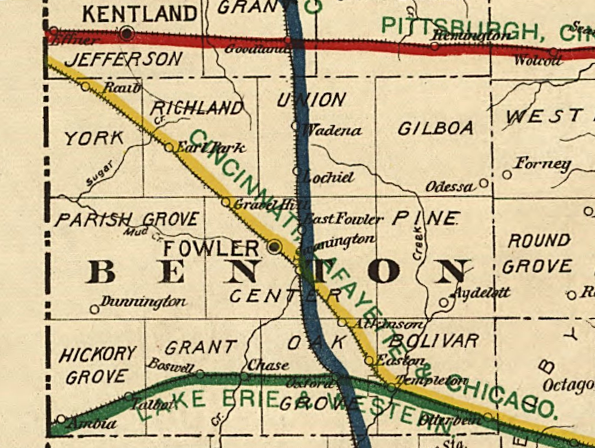
Benton County Railroad Map, circa 1896, showing the location of Wadena

Wadena was founded by John Swan in 1884 and named after Wadena, Minnesota, a town Swan had recently visited and found pleasing. The name derives from an Ojibwa term meaning "little round hill". The town was situated along a north–south rail line constructed through Benton County in the 1880s, originally operated as the Chicago and Great Southern Railway and later as the Chicago and Indiana Coal Railway, the Chicago and Eastern Illinois Railroad, and ultimately the Chicago, Attica and Southern Railroad which maintained the line until its abandonment in the 1940s. The line was also commonly known as the Coal Road and the Dolly Varden Line.

A post office was established at Wadena in 1883, and remained in operation until it was discontinued in 1919.

In the early 20th century, four Wadena residents gained national repute as professional baseball players:

- Doc Crandall: A utility pitcher for the New York Giants (1906–1914), he then joined St. Louis in the Federal League (1914–1918), then Los Angeles (Coast League).
- Karl Crandall: Played several years for a Memphis, Tennessee, team, played three years with the Indianapolis American Association (1913–1916) and then entered the Coast League.
- Arnold Crandall: Pitched for the Buffalo, New York, International League team in 1921.
- Cy Williams: outfielder for the Chicago Cubs (1913–1916), then joined the Philadelphia Nationals.

Wadena currently consists of several private residences. A monument east of town commemorates Wadena School, which served the township's students from 1895 to 1961.

On December 18, 2024, a devastating house fire in Wadena resulted in six individuals being hospitalized. The fire occurred just before midnight in the 2500 East block of 600 North, where authorities found two adults and four juveniles trapped inside the home. All six were transported to area hospitals with various injuries. Tragically, one of the juveniles later died from her injuries at IU Arnett. A GoFundMe campaign has been created to support the affected family.

== Geography ==
Wadena is located at 40°41′36″N 87°16′36″W along Benton County Road 600 North in Union Township, midway between 200 East and 300 East.

Big Pine Creek Ditch begins in the fields just west of town and flows southeast approximately six miles to Big Pine Creek. Carpenter Creek, which meets the Iroquois River about 14 miles to the north, begins northeast of Wadena. Mount Nebo, the highest point in Benton County, stands a little less than two miles to the east.
