= Grant Township, Indiana =

Grant Township is the name of four townships in the U.S. state of Indiana:

- Grant Township, Benton County, Indiana
- Grant Township, DeKalb County, Indiana
- Grant Township, Greene County, Indiana
- Grant Township, Newton County, Indiana
