= Templeton, Indiana =

- Unincorporated community
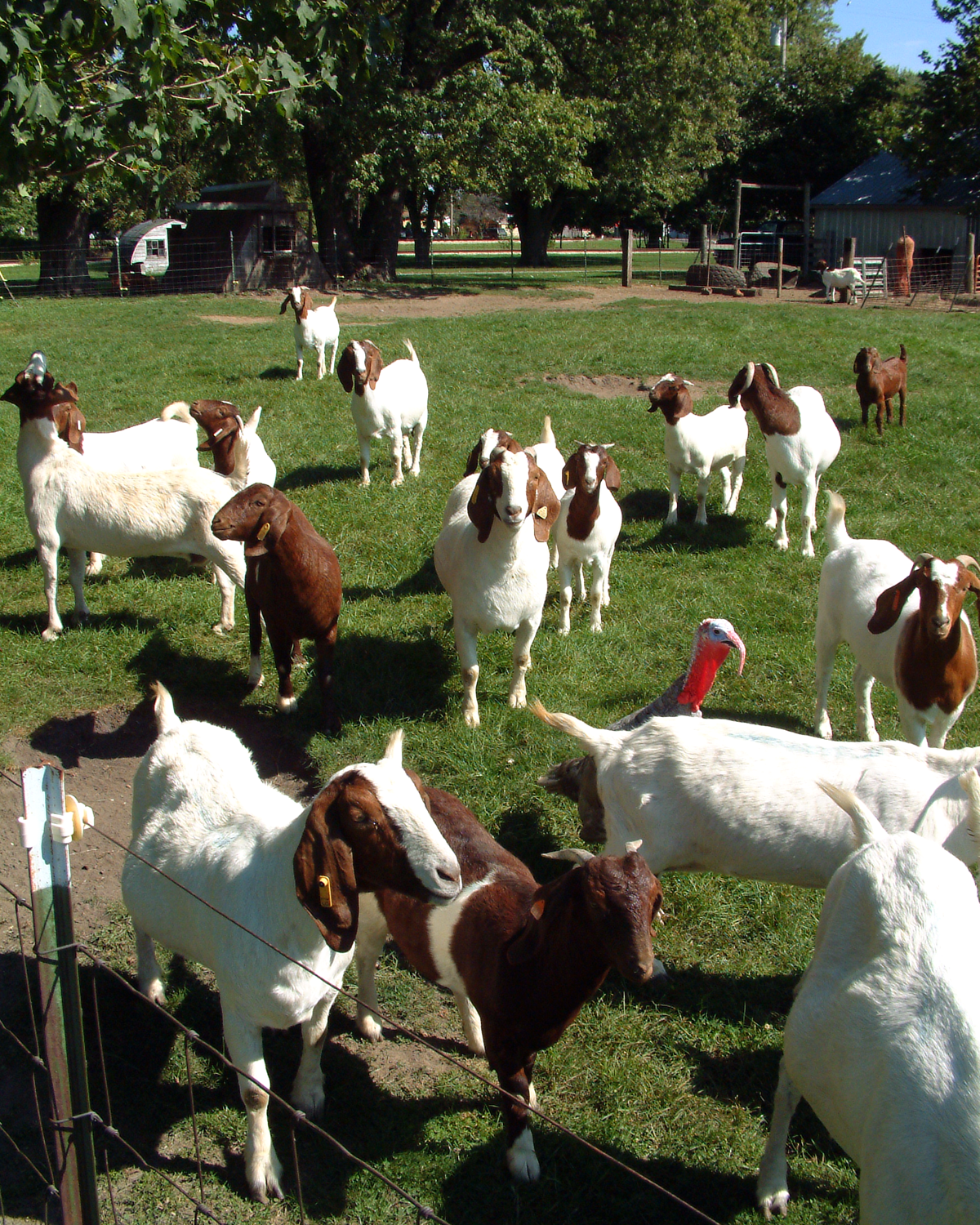
- Animals along Ann Street.

- Benton County's location in Indiana

- Freeland Park's location in Benton County
- Coordinates: 40°30′46″N 87°12′27″W
- Country: United States
- State: Indiana
- County: Benton
- Township: Bolivar
- Founded: December 23, 1873
- Named after: The Templeton family

Area
  - Total: 0.12 sq mi (0.31 km^{2})
  - Land: 0.12 sq mi (0.31 km^{2})
  - Water: 0 sq mi (0.00 km^{2})
- Elevation: 702 ft (214 m)

Population (2020)
  - Total: 75
  - Density: 635.1/sq mi (245.22/km^{2})
- Time zone: UTC-5 (Eastern (EST))
  - Summer (DST): UTC-4 (EDT)
- ZIP code: 47986
- Area code: 765
- GNIS feature ID: 444630

Templeton is an unincorporated community in Bolivar Township, Benton County, in the U.S. state of Indiana. As of the 2020 census, Templeton had a population of 75. It is part of the Lafayette, Indiana Metropolitan Statistical Area.

== History ==
Templeton was laid out by Col. William J. Templeton and his wife Melissa on December 23, 1873, and contained 225 lots. Two railways, the Cleveland, Cincinnati, Chicago and St. Louis (the "Big Four") and the Lafayette, Muncie and Bloomington (the "Nickel Plate"), intersected at the site. Its first building was a shanty occupied by John Cosgrove, and was soon followed by the dwellings of Col. Templeton and others. The town gained it first grain elevator in 1874 and a tile factory in 1881 which operated two large, steam-powered kilns. By 1883 the town's businesses included David Lanham & Co. and Finch & Son (both purveyors of dry goods and groceries), Joseph Dehart's notions and butcher shop, John Rosa's grocery, Dr. C. W. Fall (physician and pharmacist), Jasper Bristow (physician) and the Railroad House. Templeton's population numbered around 150 in the 1920s, at which time it also had a grain elevator, grade school and three or four stores.

A post office was established at Templeton in 1873, and remained in operation until it was discontinued in 1931.

== Geography ==
Templeton is located at 40°30′46″N 87°12′27″W in Bolivar Township. It is surrounded by open farmland, with Big Pine Creek less than a mile to the southeast. U.S. Route 52 passes along the town's northeast side, and the Kankakee, Beaverville and Southern Railroad, which comes in from the east, splits into two lines that head west and northwest.

== Demographics ==
Historical population
Census	Pop.	Note	%±
2020	75		—
U.S. Decennial Census

== Education ==
It is in the Benton Community School Corporation. Its comprehensive high school is Benton Central Junior-Senior High School.
