= Earl Park, Indiana =

- Town
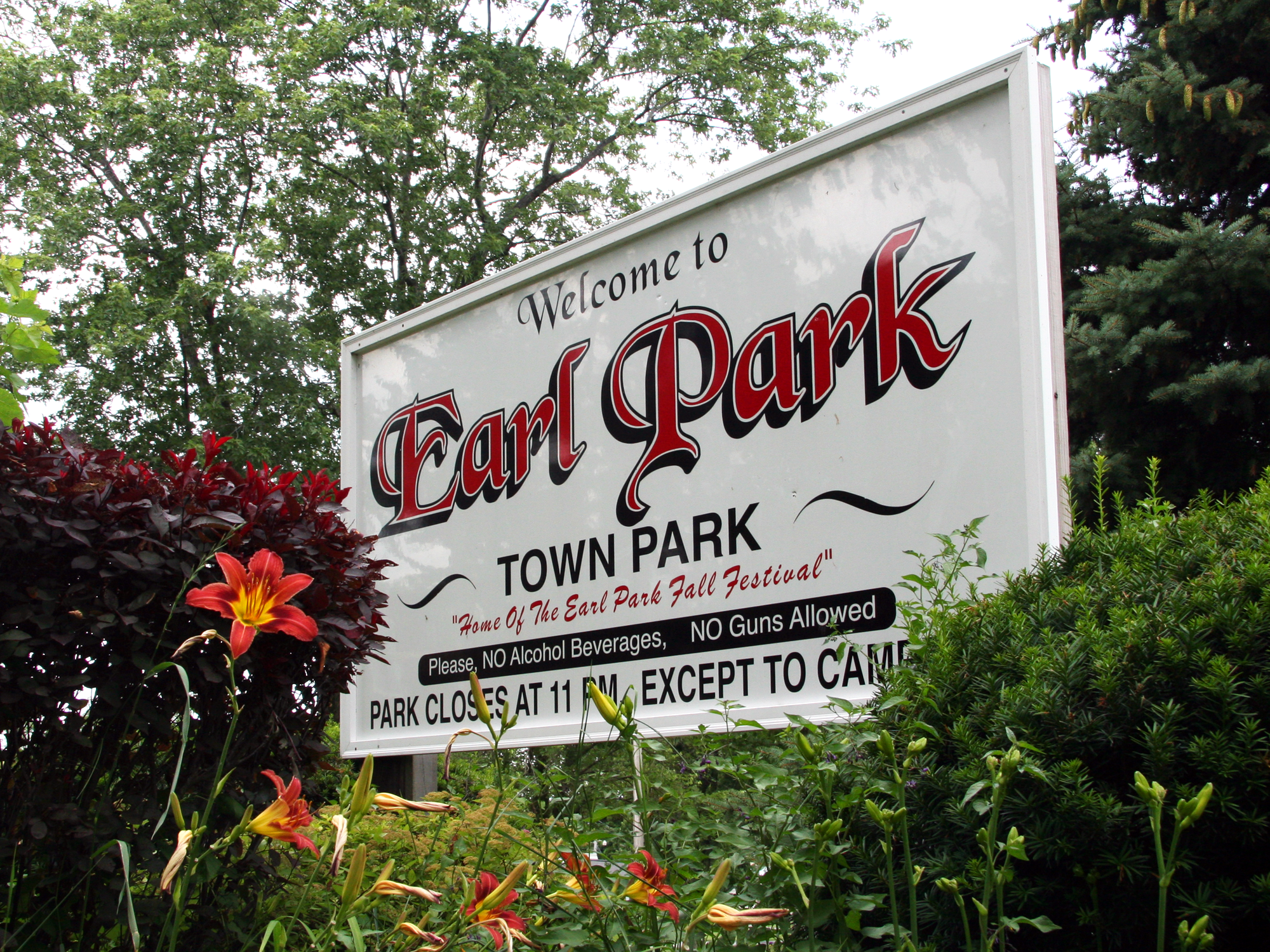
- The entrance to the town park

- Location of Earl Park in Benton County, Indiana.

- Earl Park's location in Benton County
- Coordinates: 40°41′08″N 87°25′12″W
- Country: United States
- State: Indiana
- County: Benton
- Township: Richland
- Platted: July 31, 1872

Area
  - Total: 0.92 sq mi (2.39 km^{2})
  - Land: 0.92 sq mi (2.39 km^{2})
  - Water: 0 sq mi (0.00 km^{2}) 0%
- Elevation: 787 ft (240 m)

Population (2020)
  - Total: 370
  - Density: 400.3/sq mi (154.54/km^{2})
- Time zone: UTC-5 (EST)
  - Summer (DST): UTC-4 (EDT)
- ZIP code: 47942
- Area code: 219
- FIPS code: 18-19450
- GNIS feature ID: 2396916
- Website: www.earlparkindiana.com

Earl Park is a town in Richland Township, Benton County, Indiana, United States. The population was 362 at the 2022 census. It is part of the Lafayette, Indiana Metropolitan Statistical Area.

== History ==
Earl Park was laid out July 31, 1872, by Adams D. Raub and named for his uncle, Adams Earl, one of the promoters of the Big Four railway from Lafayette to Kankakee. It consisted of 217 lots, the public sale of which on August 8 attracted some 2,000 people. Free lunch and free transportation on a special train of freight cars from Lafayette was provided. The town's first building was a grain elevator, the second the railway station. Elias Wees opened the first general store, providing residents with groceries and provisions.

Earl Park's first school, a one-story frame building, was erected around 1874 and expanded to a second story around 1878. The town gained a Catholic church in 1880, and a Methodist one in 1881, each costing about $2,500 to build and furnish. Every year, Earl Park holds the Earl Park Fall Festival, which attracts thousands of people from all over the United States. It features a carnival, tractor pull, flea market, demolition derby, and some of the finest Blue Grass bands in the United States.

Earl Park is home to the Benton County Wind Farm, the first large wind farm in Indiana, established in 2008.

Earl Park was the birthplace of Matilde E. Moisant, the second woman in the United States to receive a pilot's license.

== Geography ==
Earl Park is located in Richland Township. U.S. Route 52 skirts around the northeast edge of town, and the Kankakee, Beaverville and Southern Railroad along the southwest. The Upper Sugar Creek flows to the town's north and west.

According to the 2010 census, Earl Park has a total area of 0.94 square miles (2.43 km^{2}), all land.

== Demographics ==
Historical population
Census	Pop.	Note	%±
1900	563		—
1910	609		8.2%
1920	542		−11.0%
1930	501		−7.6%
1940	507		1.2%
1950	488		−3.7%
1960	551		12.9%
1970	478		−13.2%
1980	469		−1.9%
1990	443		−5.5%
2000	485		9.5%
2010	348		−28.2%
2020	370		6.3%
U.S. Decennial Census

=== 2010 census ===
As of the census of 2010, there were 348 people, 147 households, and 93 families living in the town. The population density was 370.2 inhabitants per square mile (142.9/km^{2}). There were 179 housing units at an average density of 190.4 per square mile (73.5/km^{2}). The racial makeup of the town was 98.3% White, 1.4% from other races, and 0.3% from two or more races. Hispanic or Latino of any race were 2.6% of the population.

There were 147 households, of which 27.9% had children under the age of 18 living with them, 49.0% were married couples living together, 8.8% had a female householder with no husband present, 5.4% had a male householder with no wife present, and 36.7% were non-families. 26.5% of all households were made up of individuals, and 8.1% had someone living alone who was 65 years of age or older. The average household size was 2.35 and the average family size was 2.86.

The median age in the town was 42 years. 20.1% of residents were under the age of 18; 10.6% were between the ages of 18 and 24; 22.4% were from 25 to 44; 32.1% were from 45 to 64; and 14.7% were 65 years of age or older. The gender makeup of the town was 53.2% male and 46.8% female.

=== 2000 census ===
As of the census of 2000, there were 485 people, 168 households, and 111 families living in the town. The population density was 514.5 inhabitants per square mile (198.6/km^{2}). There were 177 housing units at an average density of 187.8 per square mile (72.5/km^{2}). The racial makeup of the town was 98.97% White, 0.21% African American, 0.82% from other races. Hispanic or Latino of any race were 1.03% of the population.

There were 168 households, out of which 40.5% had children under the age of 18 living with them, 48.2% were married couples living together, 12.5% had a female householder with no husband present, and 33.9% were non-families. 27.4% of all households were made up of individuals, and 10.7% had someone living alone who was 65 years of age or older. The average household size was 2.57 and the average family size was 3.17.

In the town, the population was spread out, with 27.2% under the age of 18, 10.5% from 18 to 24, 26.2% from 25 to 44, 16.7% from 45 to 64, and 19.4% who were 65 years of age or older. The median age was 36 years. For every 100 females, there were 94.0 males. For every 100 females age 18 and over, there were 83.9 males.

The median income for a household in the town was $32,981, and the median income for a family was $37,188. Males had a median income of $26,667 versus $22,875 for females. The per capita income for the town was $14,369. About 8.7% of families and 10.4% of the population were below the poverty line, including 15.2% of those under age 18 and none of those age 65 or over.

== Education ==
It is in the Benton Community School Corporation. Its comprehensive high school is Benton Central Junior-Senior High School.

There was formerly a high school in Earl Park. It was closed in 1961, with students moved to the Fowler high school.

The town has a lending library, the Earl Park Public Library.

== See also ==
- Sumner Monument located in Earl Park
