= Badger Grove, Indiana =

- Unincorporated community
- Location within Indiana Location within the United States
- Coordinates: 40°35′01″N 86°57′49″W
- Country: United States
- State: Indiana
- County: White
- Township: Prairie
- Elevation: 728 ft (222 m)
- Time zone: UTC-5 (Eastern (EST))
  - Summer (DST): UTC-4 (EDT)
- ZIP code: 47923
- GNIS feature ID: 430397

Badger Grove is an unincorporated community in Prairie Township, White County, in the U.S. state of Indiana.

== History ==
A post office called Badger was established in 1881, and remained in operation until 1900. Badgers which lived in a nearby grove caused the name to be selected.

== Geography ==
Badger Grove is located at 40°35′01″N 86°57′49″W.
