= Jordan Township, Indiana =

Jordan Township is the name of two townships in the U.S. state of Indiana:

- Jordan Township, Jasper County, Indiana
- Jordan Township, Warren County, Indiana
