= Chase, Indiana =

- Unincorporated community
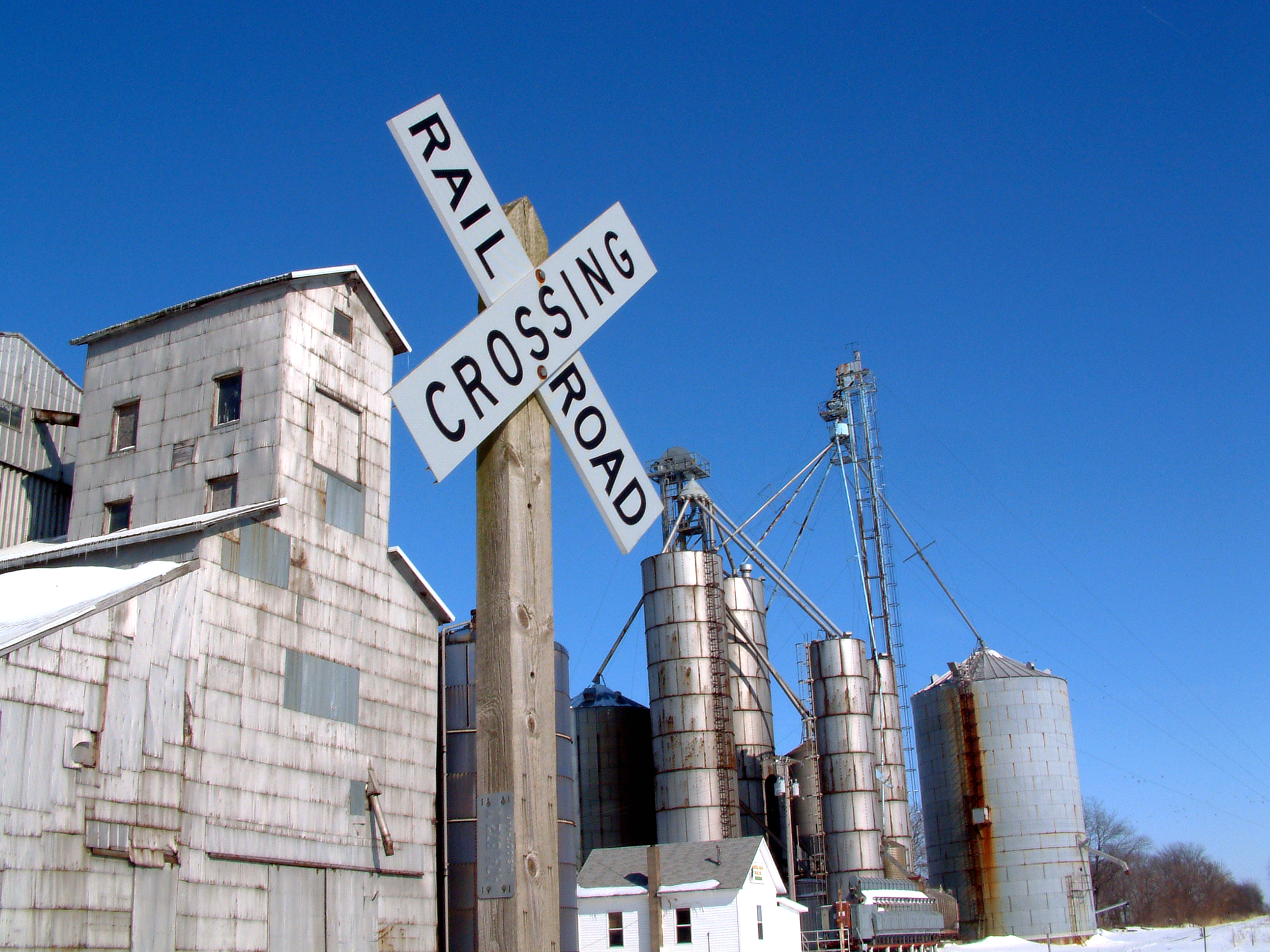
- Grain elevators along the railroad in Chase.

- Benton County's location in Indiana

- Location in Benton County
- Coordinates: 40°31′08″N 87°20′30″W
- Country: United States
- State: Indiana
- County: Benton
- Township: Grant
- Named for: Simon P. Chase
- Elevation: 745 ft (227 m)
- Time zone: UTC-5 (Eastern (EST))
  - Summer (DST): UTC-4 (EDT)
- ZIP code: 47921
- Area code: 765
- GNIS feature ID: 432433

Chase is an unincorporated community in Grant Township, Benton County, Indiana, United States. Though virtually extinct, Chase still persists on state and county maps and retains a single business in the form of grain elevators operated by Boswell Chase Grain, Inc. A few miles away is the Daughtery Motor Speedway.

== History ==
A post office was established at Chase in 1873, and remained in operation until it was discontinued in 1918. The community was named for Simon P. Chase.

== Geography ==
Chase is located at 40°31′08″N 87°20′30″W in Grant Township, and sits on a low rise surrounded on the north, south and west by Mud Pine Creek. Indiana State Road 352 and the Kankakee, Beaverville and Southern Railroad both go west through the town.
