= Springboro =

Springboro is the name of several places in the United States of America:

- Springboro, Indiana
- Springboro, Ohio
- Springboro, Pennsylvania
