= Seafield, Indiana =

- Unincorporated community
- Location within Indiana Location within the United States
- Coordinates: 40°45′23″N 86°59′12″W
- Country: United States
- State: Indiana
- County: White
- Township: Princeton
- Elevation: 699 ft (213 m)
- Time zone: UTC-5 (Eastern (EST))
  - Summer (DST): UTC-4 (EDT)
- ZIP code: 47995
- GNIS feature ID: 443180

Seafield is an unincorporated community in Princeton Township, White County, in the U.S. state of Indiana.

== History ==
Seafield was platted in 1863 as a station and shipping point on the railroad. A post office was established at Seafield in 1861, and remained in operation until 1939. The community derives its name from a merchant named Sea.

== Geography ==
Seafield is located at 40°45′23″N 86°59′12″W.
