= Benton Community Schools =

Benton Community Schools may refer to:

- Benton Community School Corporation (Indiana)
- Benton Community School District (Iowa)
