= Cy Williams =

American baseball player (1887–1974)

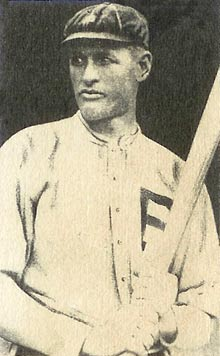
- 1921 baseball card of Williams
- Outfielder
- Born: December 21, 1887; Wadena, Indiana, U.S.
- Died: April 23, 1974 (aged 86); Eagle River, Wisconsin, U.S.
- Batted: Left Threw: Left

MLB debut
- July 18, 1912, for the Chicago Cubs

Last MLB appearance
- September 22, 1930, for the Philadelphia Phillies

MLB statistics
- Batting average: .292
- Home runs: 251
- Runs batted in: 1,005
- Stats at Baseball Reference

Teams
- Chicago Cubs (1912–1917); Philadelphia Phillies (1918–1930)

Career highlights and awards
- 4× NL home run leader (1916, 1920, 1923, 1927); Philadelphia Phillies Wall of Fame

Frederick "Cy" Williams (December 21, 1887 – April 23, 1974) was an American professional baseball player. He played in Major League Baseball as an outfielder for the Chicago Cubs (1912–17) and Philadelphia Phillies (1918–30). As Major League Baseball emerged from the dead-ball era, Williams became one of the most prominent home run hitters in the National League.

== Baseball career ==
Born in Wadena, Indiana, Williams attended Notre Dame where he studied architecture and played football with Knute Rockne. His hitting prowess caught the attention of the Chicago Cubs, who purchased his contract after he graduated from college. Williams made his major league debut with the Cubs on July 18, 1912 at the age of 24. From 1915 to 1927 he was a consistent power hitting center fielder, leading the National League in home runs four times during his career.

Williams was the first National League player to hit 200 career home runs, and is one of three players born before 1900 to hit 200 homers in his career (Babe Ruth and Rogers Hornsby are the others). He was the National League's career home run leader until his record of 251 was surpassed by Hornsby in 1929.

In a 19-year major league career, Williams played in 2,002 games, accumulating 1,981 hits in 6,780 at bats for a .292 career batting average along with 251 home runs, 1,005 runs batted in and an on-base percentage of .365. He hit over .300 six times in his career. An excellent defensive player, Williams had a .973 career fielding percentage, which was nine points higher than the league average during his playing career.

Williams was also an effective pinch-hitter in his major league career, batting .288 (49–170) with 11 home runs and 43 RBI in that role.

The infield shift, in which defensive players moved to the right side of the playing field was first employed against Williams during the 1920s. However, it later became known as the "Williams Shift" because of another hitter, Ted Williams.

Williams played in his final major league game on September 22, 1930, at the age of 42. In 1931, he served as a player-manager in the minor leagues for the Richmond Byrds of the Eastern League.

== Later life ==
After retirement, Williams worked as an architect at the 3 Lakes Theatre in Three Lakes, Wisconsin beginning in 1949. Before that, he designed the 3 Lakes Theatre's exterior and interior and later opened that June of the same year.

== See also ==
- List of Major League Baseball career home run leaders
- List of Major League Baseball career runs scored leaders
- List of Major League Baseball career runs batted in leaders
- List of Major League Baseball annual home run leaders
- List of Major League Baseball players to hit for the cycle
- List of baseball players who went directly to Major League Baseball
- Major League Baseball titles leaders

Achievements
Preceded by Jim Bottomley	Hitting for the cycle August 5, 1927	Succeeded by Bill Terry
