= Sumner Monument (Earl Park, Indiana) =

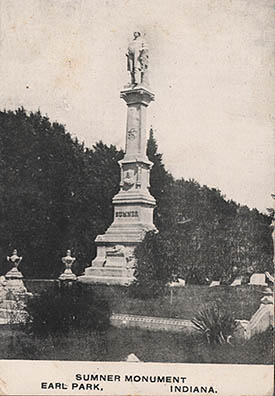
- Artist: Unknown
- Year: 1882
- Type: Granite or Marble
- Dimensions: 210 cm × 110 cm × 91 cm (84 in × 42 in × 36 in)
- Location: Sumner Cemetery; Earl Park, Indiana, United States; 40°40′31.5″N 87°25′20.9″W
- Owner: Sumner Cemetery Association

The Sumner Monument is a monument located at the Sumner Cemetery in Earl Park, Indiana, in the United States. The monument was completed in 1882 and is the final resting place of early Indiana settler and cattle baron, Edward. C. Sumner, and his wife, Abigail Sumner. The sculptor of the work is unknown.

== Description ==
The monument is a large pedestal made of either granite or marble. The Inventories of American Painting and Sculpture has documentation stating it is made of marble, however, a Save Outdoor Sculpture! surveyor stated that it was made of granite. On top of the pedestal is a statue, again, of either granite or marble, of Edward C. Sumner. He wears clothing from the 19th century. His proper left elbow rests on a tree stump. The stump is covered with vines. His proper right hand is placed in his pocket. On the shaft of the pedestal is a relief bust of his wife, Abigail Sumner. In total, the sculpture is 22 feet high. An inscription is located on the front of the base: LSC/SUMNER

A wooden sign nearby the monument reads:

Sumner Cemetery
Edward C. Sumner 1811–1882
a noted Indiana cattle baron
purchased Topeneebee's reserve
in 1846, extended holdings to
36,000 acres. Sumner, in stone,
contemplates what he in life
once owned.

== Acquisition ==
The stone (granite or marble) used for the sculpture was shipped from New York. The monument cost $10,000. The sculpture was completed in 1882. The bust relief of Abigail Sumner was completed around the time of Edward Sumner's death. The portrait was not revealed until she died.

== Condition ==
The sculpture was evaluated in 1993 by a surveyor from the Save Outdoor Sculpture! program. It was described as being "well maintained."
