= Carpenter Township, Jasper County, Indiana =

Carpenter Township
- Township
- Location in Jasper County
- Coordinates: 40°46′40″N 87°10′57″W
- Country: United States
- State: Indiana
- County: Jasper

Government
  - Type: Indiana township

Area
  - Total: 52.38 sq mi (135.7 km^{2})
  - Land: 52.29 sq mi (135.4 km^{2})
  - Water: 0.09 sq mi (0.23 km^{2}) 0.18%
- Elevation: 738 ft (225 m)

Population (2020)
  - Total: 1,925
  - Density: 36.8/sq mi (14.2/km^{2})
- GNIS feature ID: 0453157

Carpenter Township is one of thirteen townships in Jasper County, Indiana, United States. As of the 2020 census, its population was 1,925 and it contained 838 housing units.

== History ==
Fountain Park Chautauqua was listed on the National Register of Historic Places in 2001.

== Geography ==
According to the 2020 census, the township has a total area of 52.38 square miles (135.7 km^{2}), of which 52.29 square miles (135.4 km^{2}) (or 99.82%) is land and 0.09 square miles (0.23 km^{2}) (or 0.18%) is water.

=== Cities and towns ===
- Remington

=== Unincorporated towns ===
- Fountain Park

(This list is based on USGS data and may include former settlements.)

=== Adjacent townships ===
- Jordan Township (north)
- Princeton Township, White County (east)
- Gilboa Township, Benton County (south)
- Union Township, Benton County (southwest)
- Grant Township, Newton County (west)
- Iroquois Township, Newton County (northwest)

=== Cemeteries ===
The township contains two cemeteries: Remington and Sacred Heart.

=== Major highways ===
- Interstate 65
- U.S. Route 24
- U.S. Route 231

=== Airports and landing strips ===
- James Airport

== Education ==
Carpenter Township residents may request a free library card from the Remington-Carpenter Township Public Library in Remington.
