= Springboro, Indiana =

- Unincorporated community
- Location within Indiana Location within the United States
- Coordinates: 40°35′42″N 86°46′30″W
- Country: United States
- State: Indiana
- County: White
- Township: Prairie
- Elevation: 571 ft (174 m)
- Time zone: UTC-5 (Eastern (EST))
  - Summer (DST): UTC-4 (EDT)
- ZIP code: 47923
- GNIS feature ID: 444002

Springboro is an unincorporated community in Prairie Township, White County, in the U.S. state of Indiana.

== History ==
A post office was established at Springboro in 1851, and remained in operation until it was discontinued in 1853. The community took its name from Spring Creek. Springboro soon did not live up to expectations, and business activity shifted to other nearby places.

== Geography ==
Springboro is located at 40°35′42″N 86°46′30″W.
