= Milroy Township, Jasper County, Indiana =

Milroy Township
- Township
- Location in Jasper County
- Coordinates: 40°51′48″N 87°02′36″W
- Country: United States
- State: Indiana
- County: Jasper

Government
  - Type: Indiana township

Area
  - Total: 23.76 sq mi (61.5 km^{2})
  - Land: 23.76 sq mi (61.5 km^{2})
  - Water: 0 sq mi (0 km^{2}) 0%
- Elevation: 679 ft (207 m)

Population (2020)
  - Total: 256
  - Density: 11.6/sq mi (4.5/km^{2})
- GNIS feature ID: 0453630

Milroy Township is one of thirteen townships in Jasper County, Indiana, United States. As of the 2020 census, its population was 256 (down from 276 at 2010) and it contained 102 housing units.

== Geography ==
According to the 2010 census, the township has a total area of 23.76 square miles (61.5 km^{2}), all land.

=== Adjacent townships ===
- Hanging Grove Township (northeast)
- Monon Township, White County (east)
- Princeton Township, White County (south)
- Jordan Township (west)
- Marion Township (northwest)

=== Cemeteries ===
The township contains one cemetery, Milroy.

=== Major highways ===
- Indiana State Road 16

== Education ==
Milroy Township residents are eligible to obtain a free library card from the Jasper County Public Library.
