= Center Township, Benton County, Indiana =

Center Township
- Township
- Location of Center Township in Benton County
- Coordinates: 40°36′15″N 87°17′43″W
- Country: United States
- State: Indiana
- County: Benton
- Organized: June 1875

Government
  - Type: Indiana township

Area
  - Total: 53.82 sq mi (139.4 km^{2})
  - Land: 53.81 sq mi (139.4 km^{2})
  - Water: 0.01 sq mi (0.026 km^{2})
- Elevation: 804 ft (245 m)

Population (2020)
  - Total: 2,715
  - Density: 50.4/sq mi (19.5/km^{2})
- Time zone: UTC-5 (EST)
  - Summer (DST): UTC-4 (EDT)
- Area code: 765
- FIPS code: 18-11224
- GNIS feature ID: 453172

Center Township is one of eleven townships in Benton County, Indiana. As of the 2020 census, its population was 2,715 and it contained 1,212 housing units. It was organized in June 1875 and was originally known as Prairie Township.

Historical population
Census	Pop.	Note	%±
1890	2,219		—
1900	2,546		14.7%
1910	2,490		−2.2%
1920	2,529		1.6%
1930	2,624		3.8%
1940	2,840		8.2%
1950	3,012		6.1%
1960	3,345		11.1%
1970	3,418		2.2%
1980	3,062		−10.4%
1990	2,875		−6.1%
2000	2,854		−0.7%
2010	2,757		−3.4%
2020	2,715		−1.5%
Source: US Decennial Census

== Geography ==
According to the 2020 census, the township has a total area of 53.82 square miles (139.4 km^{2}), of which 53.81 square miles (139.4 km^{2}) (or 99.98%) is land and 0.01 square miles (0.026 km^{2}) (or 0.02%) is water.

=== Cities and towns ===
- Fowler (the county seat)

=== Unincorporated towns ===
- Atkinson
- Barce
- Gravel Hill
- Swanington

(This list is based on USGS data and may include former settlements.)

=== Adjacent townships ===
- Bolivar (southeast)
- Gilboa (northeast)
- Grant (southwest)
- Oak Grove (south)
- Parish Grove (west)
- Pine (east)
- Richland (northwest)
- Union (north)

=== Major highways ===
- U.S. Route 41
- U.S. Route 52
- State Road 18
- State Road 55

=== Education ===
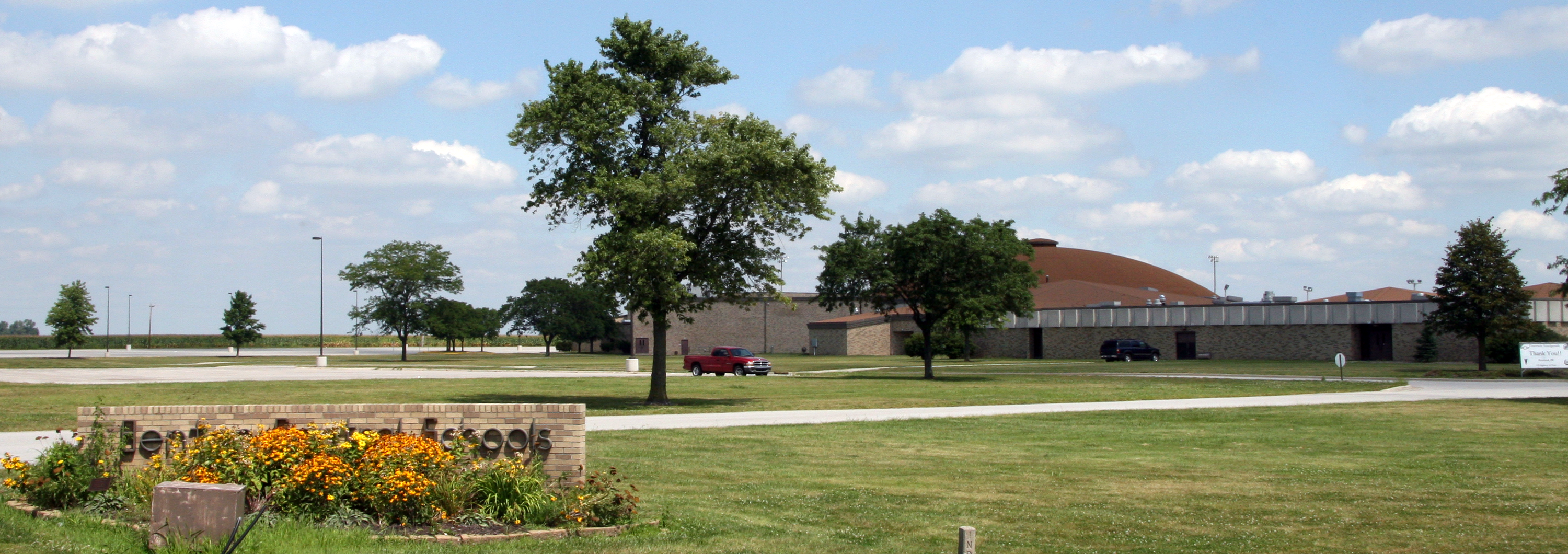
Benton Central Junior-Senior High School

- Benton Community School Corporation
