= Pine Township, Benton County, Indiana =

Pine Township
- Township
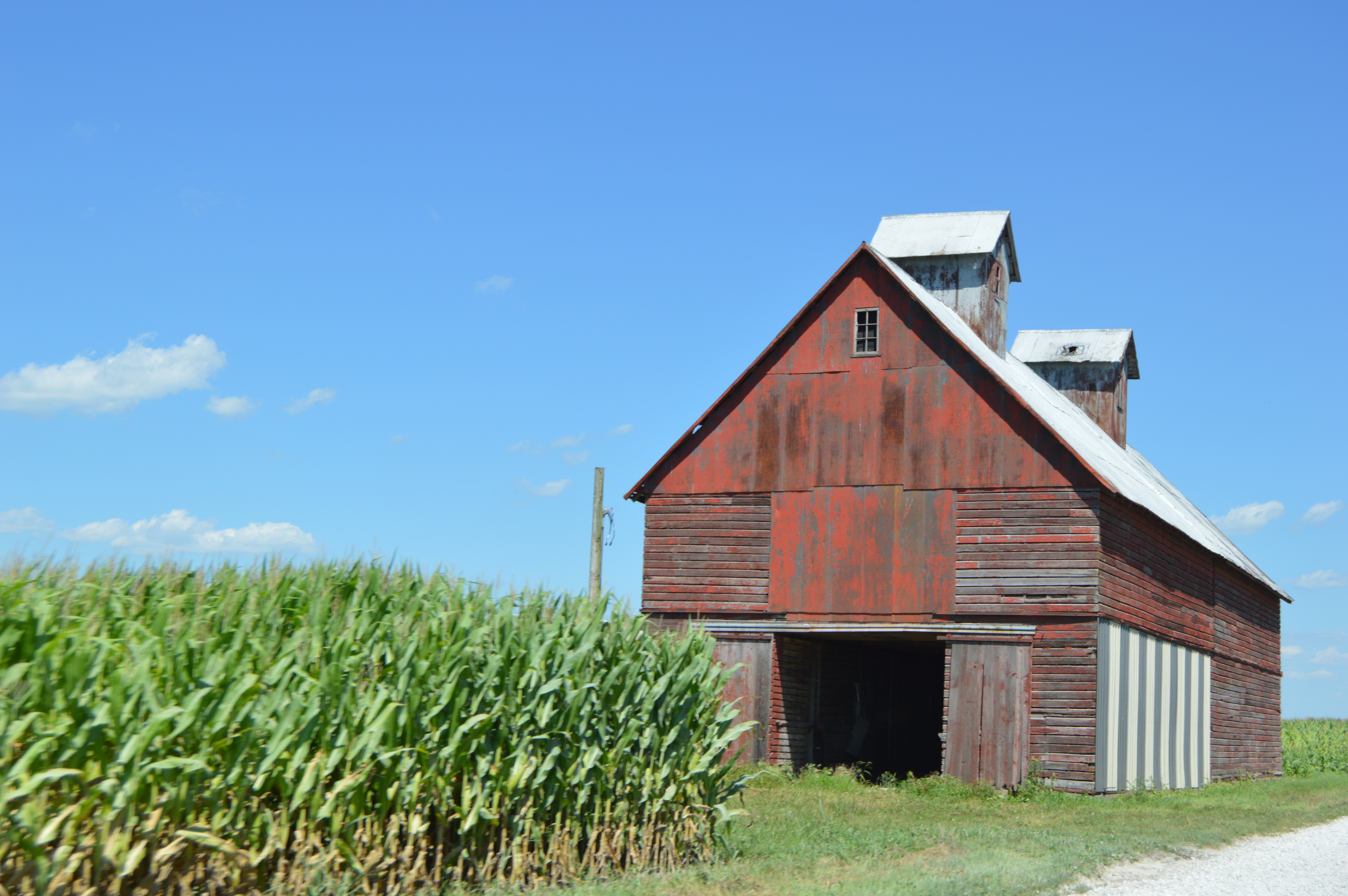
- Cornfield and grain crib on E100N

- Location of Pine Township in Benton County
- Coordinates: 40°35′56″N 87°09′03″W
- Country: United States
- State: Indiana
- County: Benton
- Organized: July 1840

Government
  - Type: Indiana township

Area
  - Total: 35.66 sq mi (92.4 km^{2})
  - Land: 35.66 sq mi (92.4 km^{2})
  - Water: 0 sq mi (0 km^{2})
- Elevation: 735 ft (224 m)

Population (2020)
  - Total: 324
  - Density: 9.09/sq mi (3.51/km^{2})
- Time zone: UTC-5 (EST)
  - Summer (DST): UTC-4 (EDT)
- FIPS code: 18-59886
- GNIS feature ID: 453738

Pine Township is one of eleven townships in Benton County, Indiana. As of the 2020 census, its population was 324 and it contained 108 housing units. Pine Township was one of the original three created by county commissioners in July 1840, and is named for Big Pine Creek which flows south through the township.

Historical population
Census	Pop.	Note	%±
1890	576		—
1900	614		6.6%
1910	592		−3.6%
1920	513		−13.3%
1930	482		−6.0%
1940	410		−14.9%
1950	428		4.4%
1960	397		−7.2%
1970	340		−14.4%
1980	264		−22.4%
1990	264		0.0%
2000	281		6.4%
2010	330		17.4%
2020	324		−1.8%
Source: US Decennial Census

== Geography ==
According to the 2020 census, the township has a total area of 35.66 square miles (92.4 km^{2}), all land.

=== Adjacent townships ===
- Bolivar (south)
- Center (west)
- Gilboa (north)
- Oak Grove (southwest)
- Union (northwest)
- Round Grove Township, White County (east)
- Shelby Township, Tippecanoe County (southeast)
- West Point Township, White County (northeast)

=== Major highways ===
- Indiana State Road 18
