= Prairie Township, White County, Indiana =

Prairie Township
- Township
- Location in White County
- Coordinates: 40°36′15″N 86°52′51″W
- Country: United States
- State: Indiana
- County: White

Government
  - Type: Indiana township

Area
  - Total: 66.61 sq mi (172.5 km^{2})
  - Land: 66.59 sq mi (172.5 km^{2})
  - Water: 0.02 sq mi (0.052 km^{2}) 0.03%
- Elevation: 686 ft (209 m)

Population (2020)
  - Total: 3,384
  - Density: 50.82/sq mi (19.62/km^{2})
- ZIP codes: 47920, 47923
- GNIS feature ID: 453773

Prairie Township is one of twelve townships in White County, Indiana, United States. As of the 2020 census, its population was 3,384 and it contained 1,413 housing units.

Prairie Township was organized in 1834. The township was named for the open prairies within its borders.

Historical population
Census	Pop.	Note	%±
1890	1,885		—
1900	2,325		23.3%
1910	2,181		−6.2%
1920	1,938		−11.1%
1930	1,892		−2.4%
1940	1,812		−4.2%
1950	1,872		3.3%
1960	2,155		15.1%
1970	2,180		1.2%
1980	2,788		27.9%
1990	2,950		5.8%
2000	3,191		8.2%
2010	3,180		−0.3%
2020	3,384		6.4%
Source: US Decennial Census

== Geography ==
According to the 2010 census, the township has a total area of 66.61 square miles (172.5 km^{2}), of which 66.59 square miles (172.5 km^{2}) (or 99.97%) is land and 0.02 square miles (0.052 km^{2}) (or 0.03%) is water.

=== Cities, towns, villages ===
- Brookston

=== Unincorporated towns ===
- Badger Grove at 40.583647°N 86.963625°W
- Springboro at 40.594481°N 86.775843°W

(This list is based on USGS data and may include former settlements.)

=== Adjacent townships ===
- Big Creek Township (north)
- Jefferson Township, Carroll County (northeast)
- Tippecanoe Township, Carroll County (east)
- Tippecanoe Township, Tippecanoe County (south)
- Wabash Township, Tippecanoe County (southwest)
- Round Grove Township (west)
- West Point Township (northwest)

=== Cemeteries ===
The township contains these six cemeteries: Carr, Chalmers, Harvey and Phebus, Independent Order of Odd Fellows, Smelcer and Spring Creek.

=== Airports and landing strips ===
- Bartlett Airport

=== Rivers ===
- Tippecanoe River

== Education ==
- Frontier School Corporation

Prairie Township is served by the Brookston-Prairie Township Public Library.

== Political districts ==
- Indiana's 4th congressional district
- State House District 15
- State House District 24
- State Senate District 07
