= Gilboa Township, Benton County, Indiana =

Gilboa Township
- Township
- Location of Gilboa Township in Benton County
- Coordinates: 40°41′36″N 87°09′31″W
- Country: United States
- State: Indiana
- County: Benton
- Organized: December 1866

Government
  - Type: Indiana township

Area
  - Total: 35.94 sq mi (93.1 km^{2})
  - Land: 35.94 sq mi (93.1 km^{2})
  - Water: 0 sq mi (0 km^{2})
- Elevation: 758 ft (231 m)

Population (2020)
  - Total: 282
  - Density: 7/sq mi (2.7/km^{2})
- Time zone: UTC-5 (EST)
  - Summer (DST): UTC-4 (EDT)
- Area code: 765
- FIPS code: 18-27630
- GNIS feature ID: 453330

Gilboa Township is one of eleven townships in Benton County, Indiana. As of the 2020 census, its population was 282 and it contained 100 housing units. It is named for Mount Gilboa, a prominence in the southern part of the township. It was created in 1866 out of the northern part of Pine Township, after the petition of 21 residents there.

Historical population
Census	Pop.	Note	%±
1890	854		—
1900	839		−1.8%
1910	721		−14.1%
1920	705		−2.2%
1930	625		−11.3%
1940	578		−7.5%
1950	513		−11.2%
1960	442		−13.8%
1970	363		−17.9%
1980	311		−14.3%
1990	281		−9.6%
2000	241		−14.2%
2010	250		3.7%
2020	282		12.8%
Source: US Decennial Census

== Geography ==
According to the 2020 census, the township has a total area of 35.94 square miles (93.1 km^{2}), all land.

=== Adjacent townships ===
- Center (southwest)
- Pine (south)
- Union (west)
- Carpenter Township, Jasper County (north)
- Princeton Township, White County (northeast)
- Round Grove Township, White County (southeast)
- West Point Township, White County (east)

=== Education ===
- Gilboa Township is served by the Tri-County School Corporation, which also serves Carpenter Township in Jasper County and Princeton, West Point, and Round Grove Townships in White County.
