= Newton Township, Jasper County, Indiana =

Newton Township
- Township
- Location in Jasper County
- Coordinates: 40°57′30″N 87°13′49″W
- Country: United States
- State: Indiana
- County: Jasper

Government
  - Type: Indiana township

Area
  - Total: 34.37 sq mi (89.0 km^{2})
  - Land: 34.35 sq mi (89.0 km^{2})
  - Water: 0.03 sq mi (0.078 km^{2}) 0.09%
- Elevation: 709 ft (216 m)

Population (2020)
  - Total: 825
  - Density: 23.6/sq mi (9.1/km^{2})
- GNIS feature ID: 0453665

Newton Township is one of thirteen townships in Jasper County, Indiana, United States. As of the 2020 census, its population was 825 (up from 811 at 2010) and it contained 325 housing units.

== Geography ==
According to the 2010 census, the township has a total area of 34.37 square miles (89.0 km^{2}), of which 34.35 square miles (89.0 km^{2}) (or 99.94%) is land and 0.03 square miles (0.078 km^{2}) (or 0.09%) is water.

=== Adjacent townships ===
- Union Township (north)
- Marion Township (east)
- Jordan Township (south)
- Iroquois Township, Newton County (southwest)
- Jackson Township, Newton County (west)
- Colfax Township, Newton County (northwest)

=== Cemeteries ===
The township contains three cemeteries: Burr Oak, Memory Gardens, bluegrass and Old Settlers.

=== Major highways ===
- Interstate 65
- Indiana State Road 14
- Indiana State Road 114

== Education ==
Newton Township residents are eligible to obtain a free library card from the Jasper County Public Library.
