= Bolivar Township, Benton County, Indiana =

Bolivar Township
- Township
- Location of Bolivar Township in Benton County
- Coordinates: 40°31′35″N 87°09′54″W
- Country: United States
- State: Indiana
- County: Benton
- Organized: March 1860
- Named after: Simón Bolivar

Government
  - Type: Indiana township

Area
  - Total: 36.1 sq mi (93 km^{2})
  - Land: 36.1 sq mi (93 km^{2})
  - Water: 0 sq mi (0 km^{2})
- Elevation: 712 ft (217 m)

Population (2020)
  - Total: 1,179
  - Density: 32.6/sq mi (12.6/km^{2})
- Time zone: UTC-5 (EST)
  - Summer (DST): UTC-4 (EDT)
- ZIP codes: 47970, 47971, 47986
- Area code: 765
- FIPS code: 18-06328
- GNIS feature ID: 453122

Bolivar Township is one of eleven townships in Benton County, Indiana. As of the 2020 census, its population was 1,179 and it contained 514 housing units. Bolivar Township was organized in March 1860 and named for South American liberator Simón Bolivar.

Historical population
Census	Pop.	Note	%±
1890	1,087		—
1900	1,178		8.4%
1910	1,402		19.0%
1920	1,374		−2.0%
1930	1,254		−8.7%
1940	1,149		−8.4%
1950	1,265		10.1%
1960	1,331		5.2%
1970	1,372		3.1%
1980	1,235		−10.0%
1990	1,277		3.4%
2000	1,310		2.6%
2010	1,252		−4.4%
2020	1,179		−5.8%
Source: US Decennial Census

== Geography ==
According to the 2020 census, the township has a total area of 36.1 square miles (93 km^{2}), all land.

=== Cities and towns ===
- Otterbein (west half)

=== Unincorporated towns ===
- Templeton

=== Adjacent townships ===
- Center (northwest)
- Oak Grove (west)
- Pine (north)
- Adams Township, Warren County (southwest)
- Medina Township, Warren County (south)
- Round Grove Township, White County (northeast)
- Shelby Township, Tippecanoe County (east)

=== Major highways ===
- U.S. Route 52
- Indiana State Road 352

=== Cemeteries ===
The township contains one cemetery, Griffin.

=== Education ===
Benton Community School Corporation
