= Richland Township, Benton County, Indiana =

Richland Township
- Township
- Location of Richland Township in Benton County
- Coordinates: 40°41′18″N 87°22′37″W
- Country: United States
- State: Indiana
- County: Benton
- Organized: December 1868

Government
  - Type: Indiana township

Area
  - Total: 35.92 sq mi (93.0 km^{2})
  - Land: 35.89 sq mi (93.0 km^{2})
  - Water: 0.03 sq mi (0.078 km^{2})
- Elevation: 781 ft (238 m)

Population (2020)
  - Total: 562
  - Density: 15.7/sq mi (6.05/km^{2})
- Time zone: UTC-5 (EST)
  - Summer (DST): UTC-4 (EDT)
- FIPS code: 18-63990
- GNIS feature ID: 453789

Richland Township is one of eleven townships in Benton County, Indiana. As of the 2020 census, its population was 562 and it contained 258 housing units. Its name is a "reference to the rich land within its borders."

Historical population
Census	Pop.	Note	%±
1890	1,124		—
1900	1,184		5.3%
1910	1,184		0.0%
1920	952		−19.6%
1930	1,031		8.3%
1940	961		−6.8%
1950	954		−0.7%
1960	1,016		6.5%
1970	867		−14.7%
1980	767		−11.5%
1990	679		−11.5%
2000	709		4.4%
2010	542		−23.6%
2020	562		3.7%
Source: US Decennial Census

== Geography ==
According to the 2020 census, the township has a total area of 35.92 square miles (93.0 km^{2}), of which 35.89 square miles (93.0 km^{2}) (or 99.92%) is land and 0.03 square miles (0.078 km^{2}) (or 0.08%) is water.

=== Cities and towns ===
- Earl Park

=== Adjacent townships ===
- Center (southeast)
- Parish Grove (southwest)
- Union (east)
- York (west)
- Grant Township, Newton County (northeast)
- Jefferson Township, Newton County (northwest)

=== Major highways ===
- U.S. Route 41
- U.S. Route 52

=== Cemeteries ===
The township contains three cemeteries: Dehner, Earl Park and Saint John.
