= West Point Township, White County, Indiana =

West Point Township
- Township
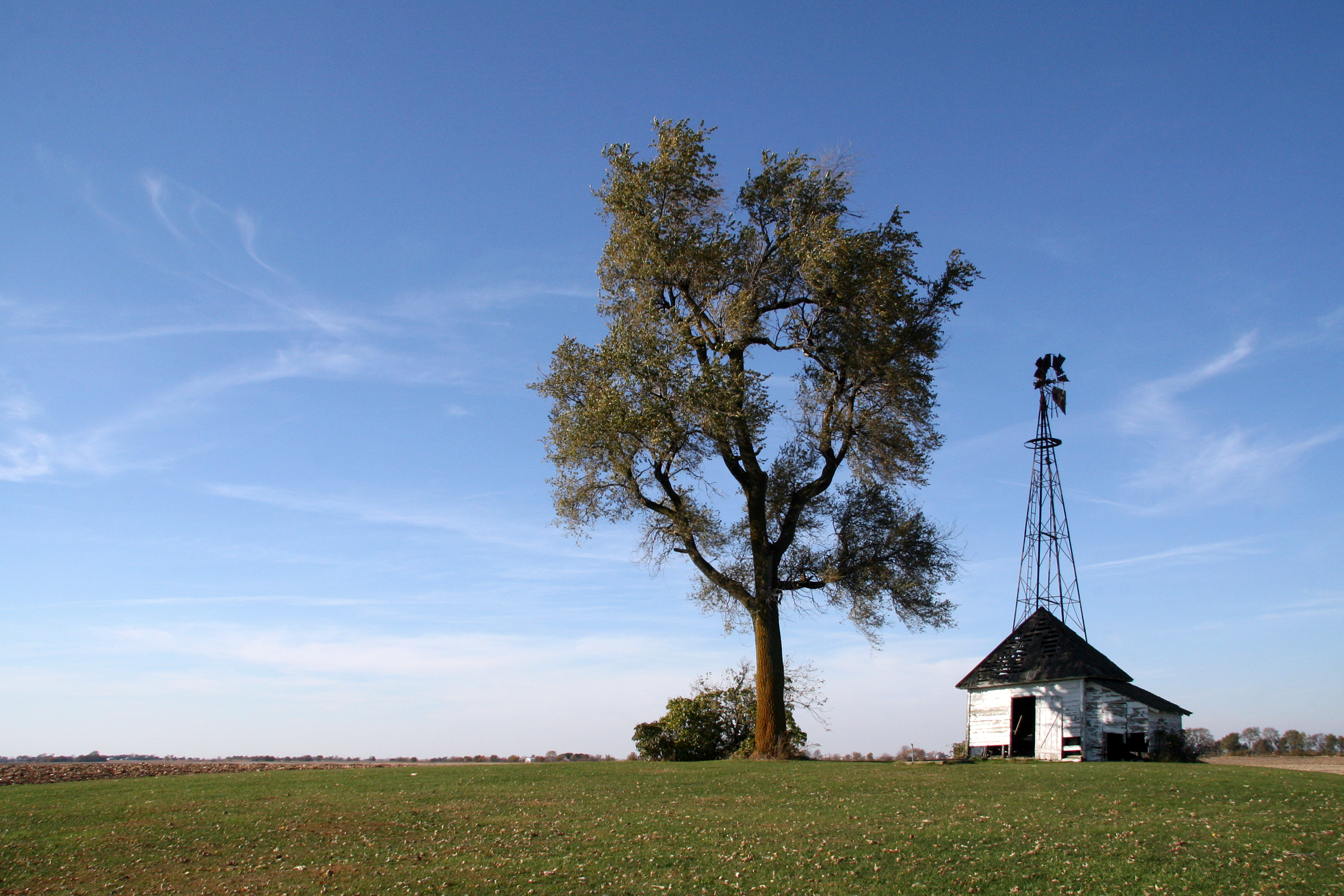
- A windmill in southwestern West Point Township

- Location in White County
- Coordinates: 40°41′26″N 87°01′02″W
- Country: United States
- State: Indiana
- County: White

Government
  - Type: Indiana township

Area
  - Total: 53.6 sq mi (139 km^{2})
  - Land: 53.53 sq mi (138.6 km^{2})
  - Water: 0.07 sq mi (0.18 km^{2}) 0.13%
- Elevation: 720 ft (220 m)

Population (2020)
  - Total: 357
  - Density: 6.67/sq mi (2.57/km^{2})
- ZIP codes: 47929, 47980, 47995
- GNIS feature ID: 454049

West Point Township is one of twelve townships in White County, Indiana, United States. As of the 2020 census, its population was 357 and it contained 136 housing units.

West Point Township was organized in 1845, and was named for a large tract of forest in the western part.

Historical population
Census	Pop.	Note	%±
1890	905		—
1900	960		6.1%
1910	922		−4.0%
1920	875		−5.1%
1930	824		−5.8%
1940	746		−9.5%
1950	672		−9.9%
1960	689		2.5%
1970	494		−28.3%
1980	430		−13.0%
1990	418		−2.8%
2000	371		−11.2%
2010	381		2.7%
2020	357		−6.3%
Source: US Decennial Census

== Geography ==
According to the 2010 census, the township has a total area of 53.6 square miles (139 km^{2}), of which 53.53 square miles (138.6 km^{2}) (or 99.87%) is land and 0.07 square miles (0.18 km^{2}) (or 0.13%) is water.

=== Adjacent townships ===
- Princeton Township (north)
- Honey Creek Township (northeast)
- Big Creek Township (east)
- Prairie Township (southeast)
- Round Grove Township (south)
- Pine Township, Benton County (southwest)
- Gilboa Township, Benton County (west)

=== Cemeteries ===
The township contains West Point Cemetery. Near the back of this cemetery is a marker for Alexander Lawrie, a northern captain in the Civil War and an artist of the Hudson River School. The market claims that Lawrie made a gift to the Indiana Museum of a set of 100 paintings of Civil War generals.

== School districts ==
- Tri-County School Corporation

== Political districts ==
- Indiana's 4th congressional district
- State House District 15
- State Senate District 07
