= Union Township, Benton County, Indiana =

Union Township
- Township
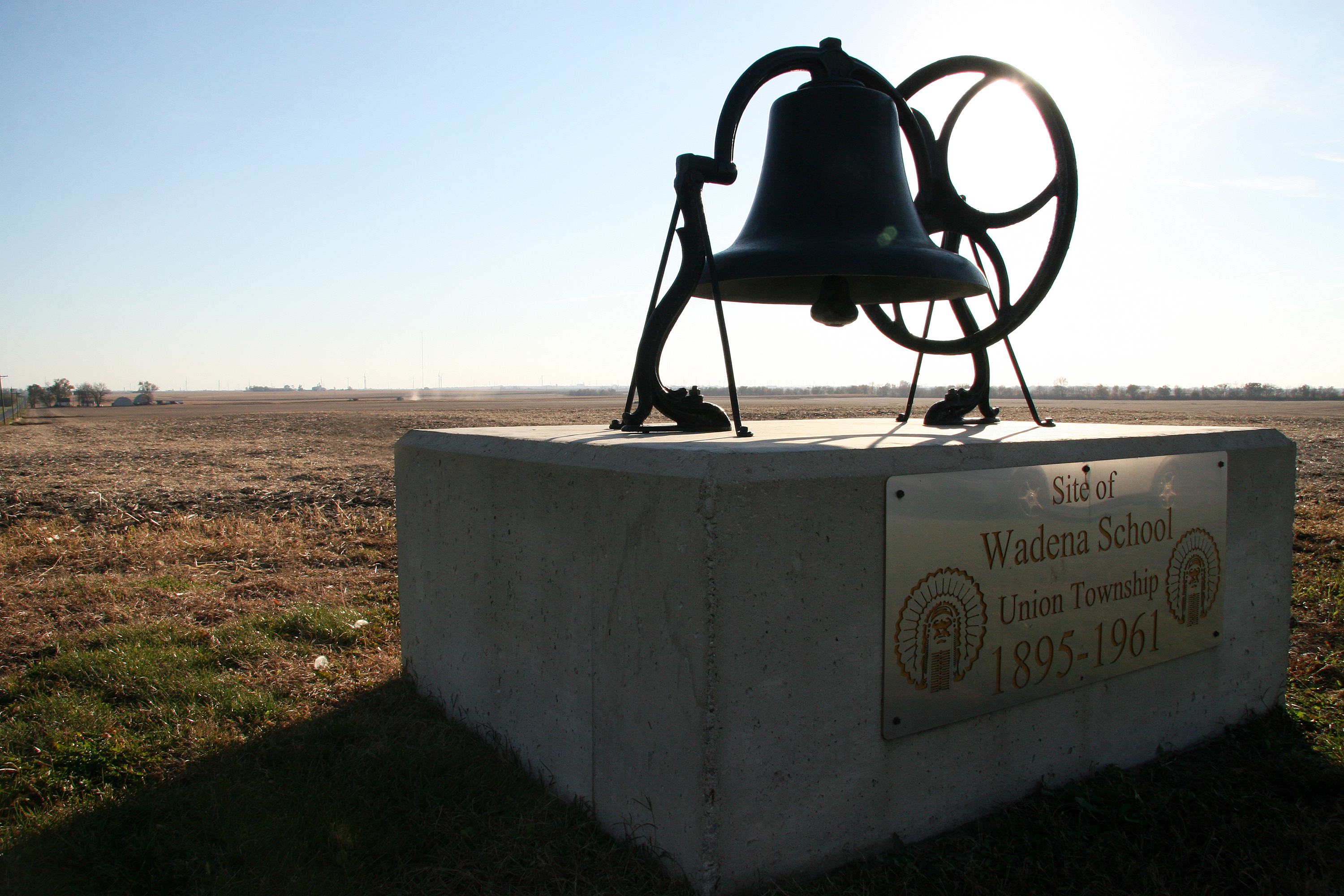
- The school monument east of Wadena.

- Location of Union Township in Benton County
- Coordinates: 40°41′28″N 87°15′50″W
- Country: United States
- State: Indiana
- County: Benton
- Organized: June 1864

Government
  - Type: Indiana township

Area
  - Total: 35.77 sq mi (92.6 km^{2})
  - Land: 35.76 sq mi (92.6 km^{2})
  - Water: 0.01 sq mi (0.026 km^{2})
- Elevation: 791 ft (241 m)

Population (2020)
  - Total: 283
  - Density: 7.91/sq mi (3.06/km^{2})
- Time zone: UTC-5 (EST)
  - Summer (DST): UTC-4 (EDT)
- FIPS code: 18-77138
- GNIS feature ID: 453907

Union Township is one of eleven townships in Benton County, Indiana. As of the 2020 census, its population was 283 and it contained 92 housing units. The township was organized in June 1864 and named by John W. Nutt "because of the loyalty shown in furnishing soldiers for the Union army."

Historical population
Census	Pop.	Note	%±
1890	982		—
1900	978		−0.4%
1910	790		−19.2%
1920	688		−12.9%
1930	674		−2.0%
1940	598		−11.3%
1950	558		−6.7%
1960	540		−3.2%
1970	405		−25.0%
1980	367		−9.4%
1990	294		−19.9%
2000	278		−5.4%
2010	255		−8.3%
2020	283		11.0%
Source: US Decennial Census

== Geography ==
According to the 2010 census, the township has a total area of 35.77 square miles (92.6 km^{2}), of which 35.76 square miles (92.6 km^{2}) (or 99.97%) is land and 0.01 square miles (0.026 km^{2}) (or 0.03%) is water.

=== Unincorporated towns ===
- Wadena

=== Adjacent townships ===
- Center (south)
- Gilboa (east)
- Pine (southeast)
- Richland (west)
- Carpenter Township, Jasper County (northeast)
- Grant Township, Newton County (northwest)

=== Major highways ===
- Indiana State Road 55
