= Princeton Township, White County, Indiana =

Princeton Township
- Township
- Location in White County
- Coordinates: 40°47′13″N 87°00′54″W
- Country: United States
- State: Indiana
- County: White

Government
  - Type: Indiana township

Area
  - Total: 62.53 sq mi (162.0 km^{2})
  - Land: 62.53 sq mi (162.0 km^{2})
  - Water: 0 sq mi (0 km^{2}) 0%
- Elevation: 692 ft (211 m)

Population (2020)
  - Total: 1,525
  - Density: 24.39/sq mi (9.416/km^{2})
- ZIP codes: 47959, 47980, 47995
- GNIS feature ID: 453777

Princeton Township is one of twelve townships in White County, Indiana, United States. As of the 2020 census, its population was 1,525 and it contained 621 housing units.

Princeton Township was organized in 1844, and named after the ship on which an early settler had immigrated to America.

Historical population
| Census | Pop. | Note | %± |
|---|---|---|---|
| 1890 | 1,465 | | — |
| 1900 | 2,282 | | 55.8% |
| 1910 | 2,158 | | −5.4% |
| 1920 | 1,972 | | −8.6% |
| 1930 | 1,824 | | −7.5% |
| 1940 | 1,746 | | −4.3% |
| 1950 | 1,607 | | −8.0% |
| 1960 | 1,675 | | 4.2% |
| 1970 | 1,556 | | −7.1% |
| 1980 | 1,535 | | −1.3% |
| 1990 | 1,495 | | −2.6% |
| 2000 | 1,529 | | 2.3% |
| 2010 | 1,553 | | 1.6% |
| 2020 | 1,525 | | −1.8% |
Source: US Decennial Census

== Geography ==
According to the 2010 census, the township has a total area of 62.53 square miles (162.0 km^{2}), all land.

=== Cities, towns, villages ===
- Wolcott

=== Unincorporated towns ===
- Seafield at 40.756428°N 86.986683°W

(This list is based on USGS data and may include former settlements.)

=== Adjacent townships ===
- Milroy Township, Jasper County (north)
- Monon Township (northeast)
- Honey Creek Township (east)
- West Point Township (south)
- Gilboa Township, Benton County (southwest)
- Carpenter Township, Jasper County (west)
- Jordan Township, Jasper County (west)

=== Cemeteries ===
The township contains these five cemeteries: Apostolic, Dobbins, Palestine, Palestine and Wolcott.

== School districts ==
- Tri-County School Corporation

== Political districts ==
- Indiana's 4th congressional district
- State House District 16
- State Senate District 07
