= Jordan Township, Jasper County, Indiana =

Jordan Township
- Township
- Location in Jasper County
- Coordinates: 40°51′24″N 87°11′58″W
- Country: United States
- State: Indiana
- County: Jasper

Government
  - Type: Indiana township

Area
  - Total: 37.5 sq mi (97 km^{2})
  - Land: 37.44 sq mi (97.0 km^{2})
  - Water: 0.05 sq mi (0.13 km^{2}) 0.13%
- Elevation: 660 ft (200 m)

Population (2020)
  - Total: 326
  - Density: 9.5/sq mi (3.7/km^{2})
- GNIS feature ID: 0453518

Jordan Township is one of thirteen townships in Jasper County, Indiana, United States. As of the 2020 census, its population was 326 (down from 355 at 2010) and it contained 141 housing units.

== Geography ==
According to the 2010 census, the township has a total area of 37.5 square miles (97 km^{2}), of which 37.44 square miles (97.0 km^{2}) (or 99.84%) is land and 0.05 square miles (0.13 km^{2}) (or 0.13%) is water. The stream of Carpenter Creek runs through this township.

=== Adjacent townships ===
- Newton Township (north)
- Marion Township (northeast)
- Milroy Township (east)
- Princeton Township, White County (east)
- Carpenter Township (south)
- Grant Township, Newton County (southwest)
- Iroquois Township, Newton County (west)

=== Cemeteries ===
The township contains one cemetery, Welsh.

=== Major highways ===
- Interstate 65
- U.S. Route 231
- Indiana State Road 16

== Education ==
Jordan Township residents are eligible to obtain a free library card from the Jasper County Public Library.
