= Big Pine Creek (Indiana) =

Stream in Indiana, United States

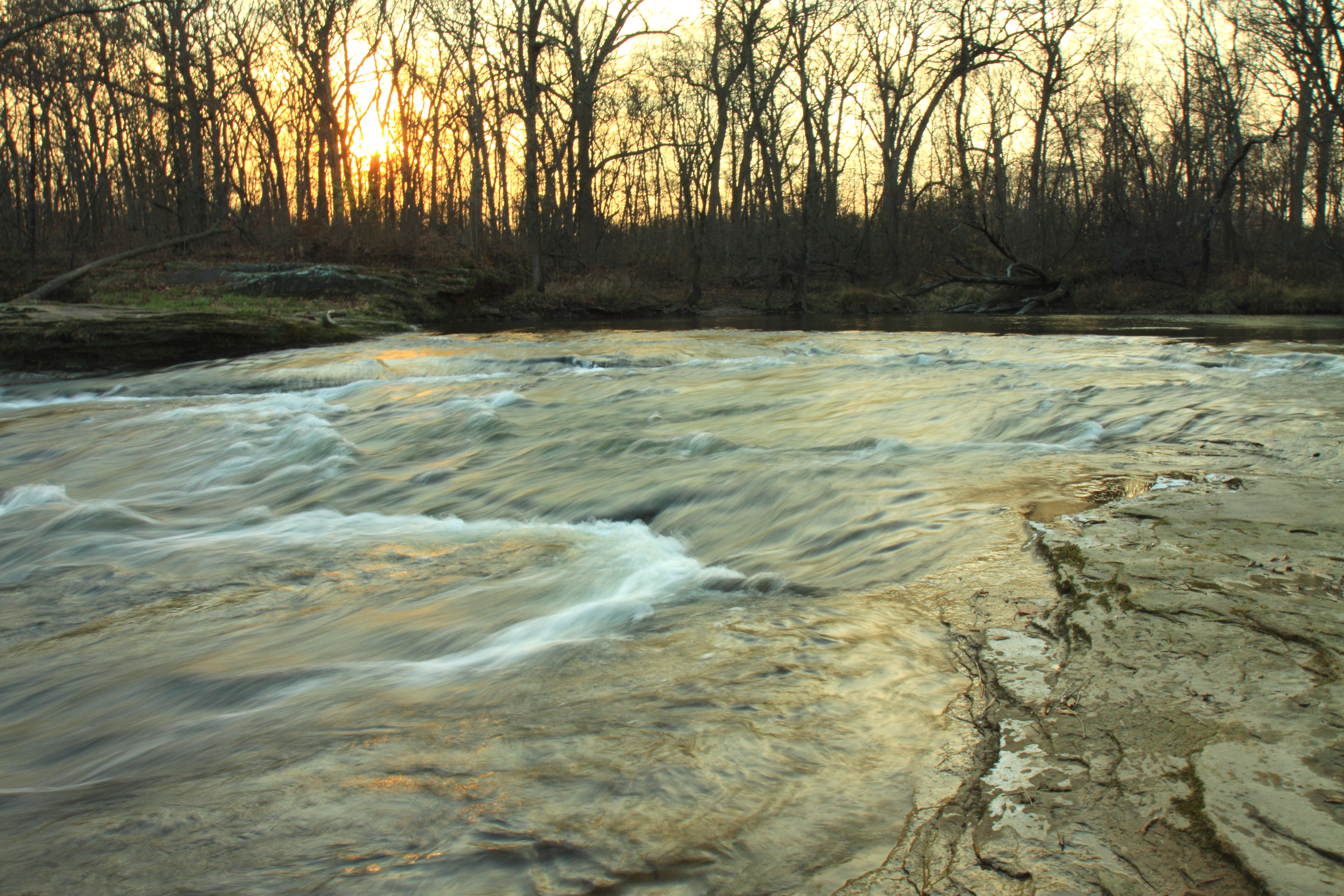
Big Pine Creek

Big Pine Creek is a creek in northwestern Indiana, United States. It begins in Round Grove Township in southwestern White County and flows generally southward 51.3 miles (82.6 km) through Benton and Warren counties before meeting the Wabash River near the town of Attica. The lower section of the creek from Rainsville to the Wabash is used by canoeists, particularly during the spring when the water is at its highest, and local flora, fauna and geology can be observed.

The source of the Big Pine Creek is located at 40°35′56″N 87°00′49″W. Its confluence with the Wabash is at 40°17′53″N 87°15′10″W.

Big Pine Creek, as measured at the USGS station at Pine Village, Indiana, is approximately 224 cubic feet per second.

The Friends of Big Pine Creek is a conservation organization dedicated to preservation and promotion of the Big Pine Creek watershed.

== Tributaries ==
Numerous smaller streams feed the Big Pine Creek, of which the most significant are (from north to south).

- Mud Pine Creek
- Spring Branch
- Fall Creek

== See also ==
- List of rivers of Indiana
