= Benton County, Indiana =

County in Indiana, United States

- County
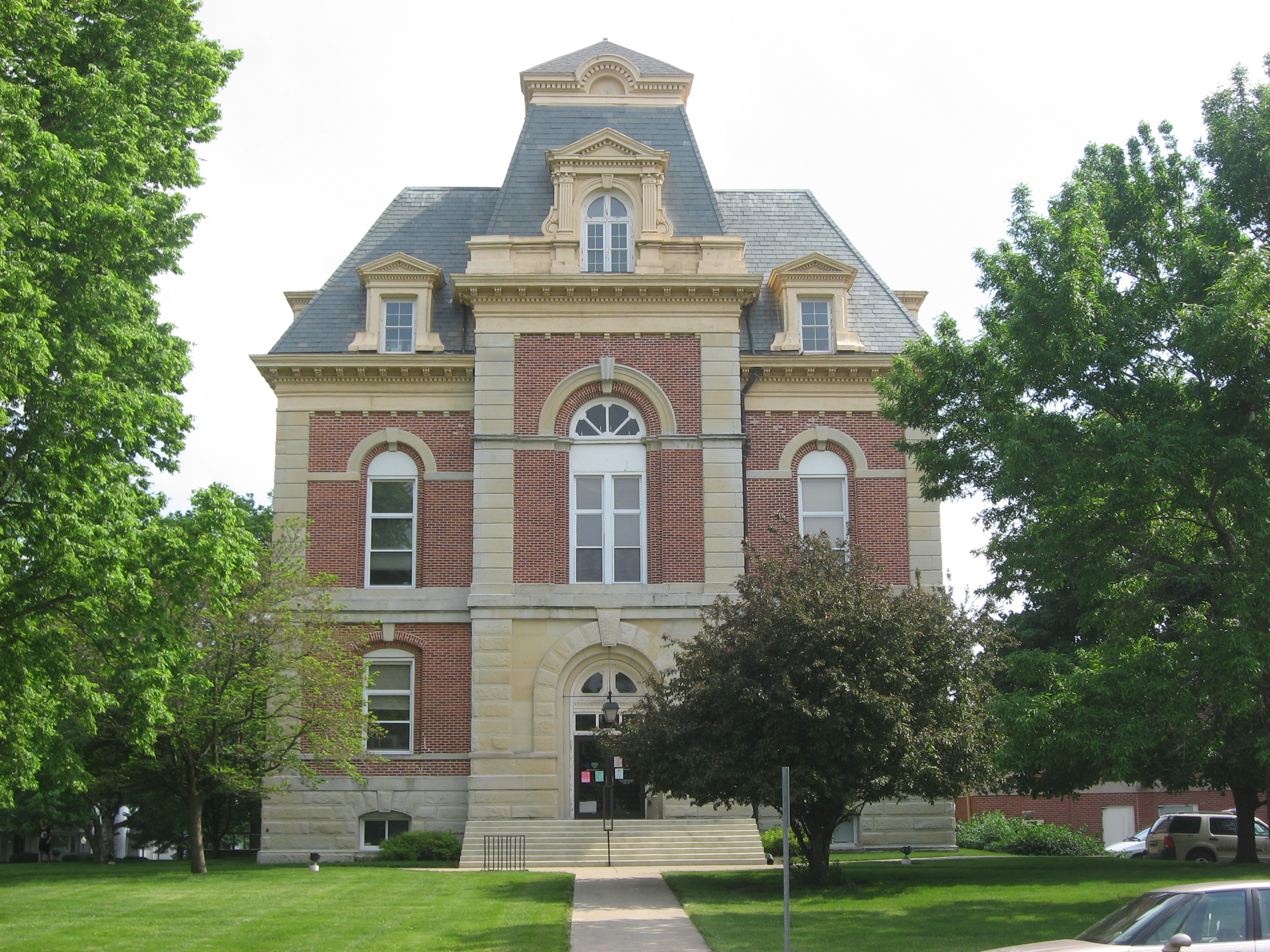
- Benton County Courthouse in Fowler, Indiana

- Flag Logo

- Location within the U.S. state of Indiana
- Coordinates: 40°37′N 87°19′W
- Country: United States
- State: Indiana
- Founded: February 18, 1840
- Named for: Senator Thomas H. Benton
- Seat: Fowler
- Largest city: Fowler

Area
  - Total: 406.51 sq mi (1,052.9 km^{2})
  - Land: 406.42 sq mi (1,052.6 km^{2})
  - Water: 0.09 sq mi (0.23 km^{2}) 0.02%

Population (2020)
  - Total: 8,719
  - Estimate (2025): 8,883 ▲
  - Density: 21.45/sq mi (8.283/km^{2})
- Time zone: UTC−5 (Eastern)
  - Summer (DST): UTC−4 (EDT)
- Congressional district: 4th
- Website: www.bentoncounty.in.gov
- Indiana county number 4; Responsible for most of Indiana's wind-produced electricity

Benton County is located in the northwest part of the U.S. state of Indiana, along the border with Illinois. As of 2020, the county's population was 8,719. It contains six incorporated towns as well as several small unincorporated settlements; it is divided into 11 townships which provide local services. The county seat is Fowler. Benton County is part of the Lafayette, Indiana metropolitan area.

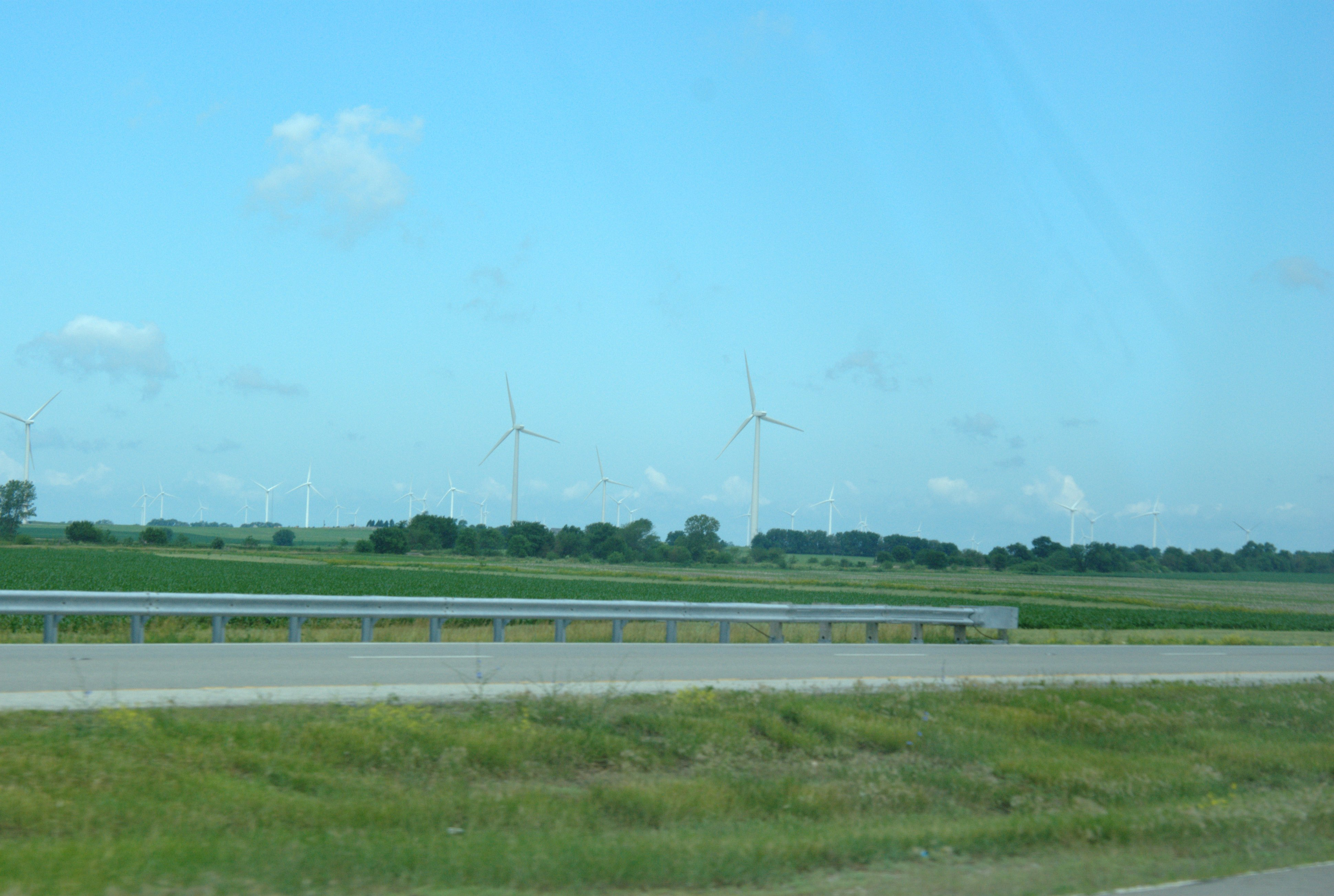
Wind turbines in Benton County

== History ==
The lands of present NW Indiana were explored by French explorer Robert de LaSalle. At that time the area was inhabited by the Miami Confederation of Indians. Through White settlement, encroachment, and confrontation, the various indigenous groups were forced to cede their claim to the area. In October 1818, the Pottawattamies, Weas, and Delawares ceded their lands west of the Tippecanoe River to the government. In a treaty dated October 23, 1826, the Pottawattamie and Miamis ceded all their lands east of the Tippecanoe. A treaty dated October 26, 1832, with the Pottawattamie ceded control of the northwestern part of Indiana; on October 27 the Pottawattamie of Indiana and Michigan also relinquished all claim to any remaining land in those states.

Before 1832, this area was not open to settlement; previous settlers had taken the southern parts of Ohio, Indiana and Illinois. Northwestern Indiana was also less desirable for farming, being described as alternate swamps, sterile sand ridges and flat, wet prairies, although it did proliferate in game.

A state legislative act dated February 7, 1835, created two counties in this area, Newton and Jasper. The county governments were not created at that time and the counties were attached to White County for administrative purposes. The Jasper County organization was effected beginning March 15, 1838. On February 18, 1840, the county of Benton was formed from Jasper's area. It was named for Thomas H. Benton (D), U.S. Senator from Missouri. The original county seat selected in 1843 was Oxford, but after a long struggle between contending factions it was moved to Fowler in 1874.

=== Courthouse ===
The current Benton County courthouse, located in Fowler, was designed by Gurdon P. Randall of Chicago and built in 1874 by Levi L. Leach at a cost of $62,257. (Note: A $62,257 capital expense in 1874 would be roughly equivalent to $15,000,000 in 2009.) The new courthouse was an impressive building from an architectural standpoint, but also provided much-needed improvements in security, including large fire-proof vaults. Randall had designed the Marshall County courthouse a few years earlier.

== Economy ==
In 2008 the Benton County Wind Farm began operating with 87 1.5 MW wind turbines. Duke Energy purchases electricity from the wind farm and sells it to customers through its GoGreen program.

In 2009 the Fowler Ridge Wind Farm opened nearby, giving Benton County one of the largest concentrations of wind turbines in the United States east of the Mississippi River.

== Geography ==
Map of Benton County, showing townships and settlements

Benton County lies along the state's western border with Illinois. It consists of low rolling hills, with all available terrain devoted to agriculture or development. Data gathered from space shuttle measurements list the county's lowest elevation as 138 meters (453 feet) and its highest elevation as 240 meters (790 feet). However, a knoll 4 miles (6.4 km) NNW of Boswell is shown on official topographic maps as 915 feet (279 meters) ASL.

According to the 2010 census, the county has a total area of 406.51 square miles (1,052.9 km^{2}), of which 406.42 square miles (1,052.6 km^{2}) (or 99.98%) is land and 0.09 square miles (0.23 km^{2}) (or 0.02%) is water.

=== Adjacent counties ===
- Newton County - northwest
- Jasper County - northeast
- White County - east
- Tippecanoe County - southeast
- Warren County - south
- Vermilion County, Illinois - southwest
- Iroquois County, Illinois - west

=== Cities and towns ===
- Fowler
- Otterbein (west half)
- Oxford
- Boswell
- Earl Park
- Ambia

=== Census-designated place ===
- Templeton

=== Unincorporated towns ===
- Atkinson
- Barce
- Chase
- Dunnington
- Freeland Park
- Gravel Hill
- Powley Corners (partial)
- Raub
- Swanington
- Talbot
- Wadena

=== Extinct towns ===
- Dunn
- Sheff

=== Townships ===
- Bolivar
- Center
- Gilboa
- Grant
- Hickory Grove
- Oak Grove
- Parish Grove
- Pine
- Richland
- Union
- York

=== Major highways ===
- U.S. Route 52
- U.S. Route 41
- State Road 18
- State Road 55
- State Road 71
- State Road 352

=== Railroads ===
- Bee Line Railroad
- Kankakee, Beaverville and Southern Railroad

== Education ==
Three school districts cover portions of the county: Benton Community School Corporation, South Newton School Corporation, and Tri-County School Corporation. The three public schools within the county limits are administered by the Benton school district.

- Benton Central Junior-Senior High School
- Otterbein Elementary School
- Prairie Crossing Elementary School
- Previously there was Boswell Elementary School (closed at end of May 2021)

Private school:

- Sacred Heart Elementary, the county's only parochial school

== Climate and weather ==
Fowler, Indiana

Climate chart (precipitation, max. and min. temperature)
J	F	M	A	M	J	J	A	S	O	N	D
1.7 30 13	1.6 35 17	3.2 47 27	3.6 60 38	4.2 72 49	4.5 81 59	3.7 84 62	3 82 59	2.6 77 51	3 64 39	3 48 30	2.5 35 19
- █ Average max. and min. temperatures in °F
- █ Precipitation totals in inches
- Source: The Weather Channel
Metric conversion
J	F	M	A	M	J	J	A	S	O	N	D
42 −1 −11	40 2 −8	80 8 −3	90 16 3	106 22 9	114 27 15	93 29 17	77 28 15	67 25 11	75 18 4	75 9 −1	64 2 −7
- █ Average max. and min. temperatures in °C
- █ Precipitation totals in mm

In recent years, average temperatures in Fowler have ranged from a low of 13 °F (−11 °C) in January to a high of 84 °F (29 °C) in July, although a record low of −24 °F (−31 °C) was recorded in January 1999 and a record high of 99 °F (37 °C) was recorded in July 1995. Average monthly precipitation ranged from 1.59 inches (40 mm) in February to 4.50 inches (114 mm) in June.

== Government ==
The county government is a constitutional body granted specific powers by the Constitution of Indiana and the Indiana Code. The county council is the legislative branch of the county government, controlling spending and revenue collection. Representatives, elected to staggered four-year terms from county districts, determine salaries, the annual budget and special spending. The council has limited authority to impose local taxes, in the form of an income and property tax that is subject to state level approval, excise taxes and service taxes. In 2010, the county budgeted approximately $5 million for the district's schools and $2.8 million for other county operations and services, for a total annual budget of approximately $7.8 million.

The Board of Commissioners is the county's executive body. They are elected countywide, in staggered four-year terms. One commissioner serves as board president. The commissioners execute acts legislated by the council, collecting revenue and managing day-to-day functions of the county government.

The county maintains a small claims court that can handle some civil cases. The court judge is elected to a term of four years and must be a member of the Indiana Bar Association. The judge is assisted by a constable who is elected to a four-year term. In some cases, court decisions can be appealed to the state level circuit court.

The county has several other elected offices, including sheriff, coroner, auditor, treasurer, recorder, surveyor and circuit court clerk. They are elected to four-year terms. Members elected to county government positions are required to declare party affiliations and be residents of the county.

Each township has a trustee who administers rural fire protection and ambulance service, provides poor relief and manages cemetery care, among other duties. The trustee is assisted in these duties by a three-member township board. The trustees and board members are elected to four-year terms.

Benton County is in Indiana's 4th Congressional District, represented by Jim Baird in the United States Congress. It is part of Indiana Senate district 6 and Indiana House of Representatives district 13. It had previously been part of House District 15.

United States presidential election results for Benton County, Indiana
Year	Republican		Democratic		Third party(ies)	
Year	No.	%	No.	%	No.	%
1888	1,626	52.18%	1,425	45.73%	65	2.09%
1892	1,617	50.82%	1,391	43.71%	174	5.47%
1896	1,998	55.13%	1,582	43.65%	44	1.21%
1900	2,032	54.98%	1,563	42.29%	101	2.73%
1904	2,098	56.60%	1,470	39.65%	139	3.75%
1908	1,936	53.48%	1,566	43.26%	118	3.26%
1912	1,030	30.42%	1,425	42.09%	931	27.50%
1916	1,872	54.17%	1,502	43.46%	82	2.37%
1920	3,900	64.13%	2,098	34.50%	83	1.36%
1924	3,250	58.14%	2,104	37.64%	236	4.22%
1928	3,360	58.37%	2,368	41.14%	28	0.49%
1932	2,433	40.67%	3,496	58.43%	54	0.90%
1936	2,989	47.21%	3,211	50.72%	131	2.07%
1940	3,675	57.57%	2,689	42.12%	20	0.31%
1944	3,621	63.38%	2,065	36.15%	27	0.47%
1948	3,224	57.88%	2,317	41.60%	29	0.52%
1952	4,125	69.25%	1,815	30.47%	17	0.29%
1956	4,004	67.02%	1,961	32.83%	9	0.15%
1960	3,626	60.11%	2,399	39.77%	7	0.12%
1964	2,886	49.49%	2,940	50.42%	5	0.09%
1968	3,326	59.54%	1,854	33.19%	406	7.27%
1972	3,703	70.01%	1,566	29.61%	20	0.38%
1976	3,093	59.09%	2,071	39.57%	70	1.34%
1980	3,189	64.26%	1,520	30.63%	254	5.12%
1984	3,281	70.38%	1,357	29.11%	24	0.51%
1988	2,698	66.31%	1,349	33.15%	22	0.54%
1992	2,030	46.96%	1,221	28.24%	1,072	24.80%
1996	1,947	49.92%	1,311	33.62%	642	16.46%
2000	2,441	63.01%	1,328	34.28%	105	2.71%
2004	2,797	70.07%	1,135	28.43%	60	1.50%
2008	2,183	57.19%	1,563	40.95%	71	1.86%
2012	2,329	65.09%	1,159	32.39%	90	2.52%
2016	2,579	69.93%	860	23.32%	249	6.75%
2020	3,007	73.07%	1,009	24.52%	99	2.41%
2024	2,873	72.66%	1,010	25.54%	71	1.80%

== Demographics ==
Historical population
Census	Pop.	Note	%±
1850	1,144		—
1860	2,809		145.5%
1870	5,615		99.9%
1880	11,108		97.8%
1890	11,903		7.2%
1900	13,123		10.2%
1910	12,688		−3.3%
1920	12,206		−3.8%
1930	11,886		−2.6%
1940	11,117		−6.5%
1950	11,462		3.1%
1960	11,912		3.9%
1970	11,262		−5.5%
1980	10,218		−9.3%
1990	9,441		−7.6%
2000	9,421		−0.2%
2010	8,854		−6.0%
2020	8,719		−1.5%
2025 (est.)	8,883	▲	1.9%
US Decennial Census; 1790-1960 1900-1990; 1990-2000 2010

=== Racial and ethnic composition ===
Benton County, Indiana – Racial and ethnic composition Note: the US Census treats Hispanic/Latino as an ethnic category. This table excludes Latinos from the racial categories and assigns them to a separate category. Hispanics/Latinos may be of any race.
Race / Ethnicity (NH = Non-Hispanic)	Pop 1980	Pop 1990	Pop 2000	Pop 2010	Pop 2020	% 1980	% 1990	% 2000	% 2010	% 2020
White alone (NH)	10,136	9,310	9,040	8,298	7,789	99.20%	98.61%	95.96%	93.72%	89.33%
Black or African American alone (NH)	11	6	18	36	44	0.11%	0.06%	0.19%	0.41%	0.50%
Native American or Alaska Native alone (NH)	6	16	8	11	15	0.06%	0.17%	0.08%	0.12%	0.17%
Asian alone (NH)	2	1	8	15	13	0.02%	0.01%	0.08%	0.17%	0.15%
Native Hawaiian or Pacific Islander alone (NH)	x	x	0	3	7	x	x	0.00%	0.03%	0.08%
Other race alone (NH)	6	0	0	2	28	0.06%	0.00%	0.00%	0.02%	0.32%
Mixed race or Multiracial (NH)	x	x	102	58	194	x	x	1.08%	0.66%	2.23%
Hispanic or Latino (any race)	57	108	245	431	629	0.56%	1.14%	2.60%	4.87%	7.21%
Total	10,218	9,441	9,421	8,854	8,719	100.00%	100.00%	100.00%	100.00%	100.00%

=== 2020 census ===
As of the 2020 census, the county had a population of 8,719. The median age was 40.2 years. 24.8% of residents were under the age of 18 and 18.0% of residents were 65 years of age or older. For every 100 females there were 100.7 males, and for every 100 females age 18 and over there were 97.8 males age 18 and over.

The racial makeup of the county was 91.2% White, 0.6% Black or African American, 0.3% American Indian and Alaska Native, 0.1% Asian, 0.1% Native Hawaiian and Pacific Islander, 3.5% from some other race, and 4.1% from two or more races. Hispanic or Latino residents of any race comprised 7.2% of the population.

<0.1% of residents lived in urban areas, while 100.0% lived in rural areas.

There were 3,408 households in the county, of which 32.0% had children under the age of 18 living in them. Of all households, 50.5% were married-couple households, 18.4% were households with a male householder and no spouse or partner present, and 23.4% were households with a female householder and no spouse or partner present. About 26.3% of all households were made up of individuals and 13.2% had someone living alone who was 65 years of age or older.

There were 3,783 housing units, of which 9.9% were vacant. Among occupied housing units, 75.0% were owner-occupied and 25.0% were renter-occupied. The homeowner vacancy rate was 2.0% and the rental vacancy rate was 9.6%.

=== American community survey ===
In terms of ancestry, 25.6% were German, 12.9% were Irish, 5.4% were English, and 5.2% were French (not Basque).

The average household size was 2.49. Of the total population, 18.5% have a visual or non-visual disability.

The median income for a household in the county was $49,488 and the median income for a family was $57,131 and $32,055 for nonfamily households. The per capita income for the county was $25,187. Additionally, 13.5% of the population were below the poverty line, including 19.4% of those under age 18 and 5.8% of those age 65 or over.

Of the total 2020 population, 6.5% were veterans. Regarding educational attainment, 42.8% earned a high school diploma or equivalent and 16.1% a bachelor's degree or higher. Of those employed, 20.4% work in education, health care and social services; 19.9% work in manufacturing, 10.1% work in retail, and 8.6% work in agriculture, forestry, fishing, hunting or mining. Finally, 35.4% of science, technology, engineering and math jobs are held by females.

== See also ==
- List of sundown towns in the United States
- National Register of Historic Places listings in Benton County, Indiana
