= Round Grove Township, White County, Indiana =

Round Grove Township
- Township
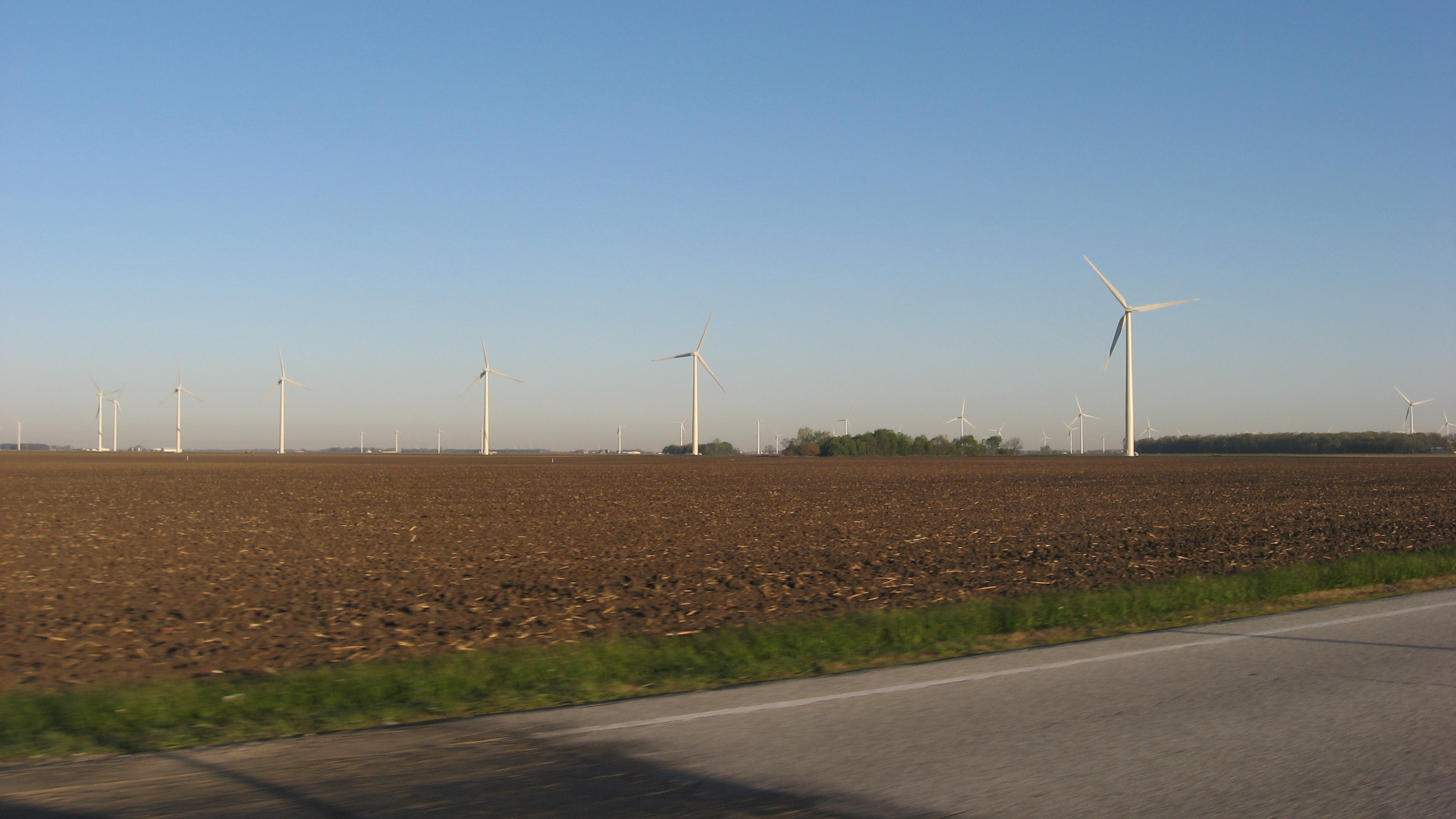
- Part of the Meadow Lake Wind Farm in the township

- Location in White County
- Coordinates: 40°36′16″N 87°02′12″W
- Country: United States
- State: Indiana
- County: White

Government
  - Type: Indiana township

Area
  - Total: 35.51 sq mi (92.0 km^{2})
  - Land: 35.48 sq mi (91.9 km^{2})
  - Water: 0.03 sq mi (0.078 km^{2}) 0.08%
- Elevation: 728 ft (222 m)

Population (2020)
  - Total: 252
  - Density: 7.10/sq mi (2.74/km^{2})
- ZIP codes: 47906, 47923
- GNIS feature ID: 453815

Round Grove Township is one of twelve townships in White County, Indiana, United States. As of the 2020 census, its population was 252 and it contained 100 housing units.

Round Grove Township was established in 1858. The township was named for a former round grove in the southern half of the township.

Historical population
Census	Pop.	Note	%±
1890	779		—
1900	890		14.2%
1910	628		−29.4%
1920	641		2.1%
1930	537		−16.2%
1940	494		−8.0%
1950	446		−9.7%
1960	418		−6.3%
1970	382		−8.6%
1980	282		−26.2%
1990	250		−11.3%
2000	246		−1.6%
2010	259		5.3%
2020	252		−2.7%
Source: US Decennial Census

== Geography ==
According to the 2010 census, the township has a total area of 35.51 square miles (92.0 km^{2}), of which 35.48 square miles (91.9 km^{2}) (or 99.92%) is land and 0.03 square miles (0.078 km^{2}) (or 0.08%) is water.

=== Unincorporated towns ===
- Round Grove at 40.590314°N 87.030293°W

(This list is based on USGS data and may include former settlements.)

=== Adjacent townships ===
- West Point Township (north)
- Prairie Township (east)
- Wabash Township, Tippecanoe County (southeast)
- Shelby Township, Tippecanoe County (south)
- Bolivar Township, Benton County (southwest)
- Pine Township, Benton County (west)
- Gilboa Township, Benton County (northwest)

== School districts ==
- Tri-County School Corporation

== Political districts ==
- Indiana's 4th congressional district
- State House District 15
- State Senate District 07
