= Grant Township, Benton County, Indiana =

Grant Township
- Township
- Location of Grant Township in Benton County
- Coordinates: 40°31′12″N 87°22′41″W
- Country: United States
- State: Indiana
- County: Benton
- Organized: December 1868
- Named after: Ulysses Grant

Government
  - Type: Indiana township

Area
  - Total: 35.94 sq mi (93.1 km^{2})
  - Land: 35.93 sq mi (93.1 km^{2})
  - Water: 0.01 sq mi (0.026 km^{2})
- Elevation: 751 ft (229 m)

Population (2020)
  - Total: 1,085
  - Density: 30.1/sq mi (11.6/km^{2})
- Time zone: UTC-5 (EST)
  - Summer (DST): UTC-4 (EDT)
- Area code: 765
- FIPS code: 18-28818
- GNIS feature ID: 453334

Grant Township is one of eleven townships in Benton County, Indiana. As of the 2020 census, its population was 1,085 and it contained 470 housing units. It was organized in December 1868 and was named for Ulysses Grant.

Historical population
Census	Pop.	Note	%±
1890	1,331		—
1900	1,547		16.2%
1910	1,408		−9.0%
1920	1,424		1.1%
1930	1,432		0.6%
1940	1,384		−3.4%
1950	1,481		7.0%
1960	1,449		−2.2%
1970	1,391		−4.0%
1980	1,202		−13.6%
1990	1,118		−7.0%
2000	1,142		2.1%
2010	1,056		−7.5%
2020	1,085		2.7%
Source: US Decennial Census

== Geography ==
According to the 2020 census, the township has a total area of 35.94 square miles (93.1 km^{2}), of which 35.93 square miles (93.1 km^{2}) (or 99.97%) is land and 0.01 square miles (0.026 km^{2}) (or 0.03%) is water.

=== Cities and towns ===
- Boswell

=== Unincorporated towns ===
- Chase

=== Adjacent townships ===
- Center (northeast)
- Hickory Grove (west)
- Oak Grove (east)
- Parish Grove (northwest)
- Pine Township, Warren County (southeast)
- Prairie Township, Warren County (southwest)

=== Major highways ===
- U.S. Route 41
- State Road 352

=== Cemeteries ===
The township contains three cemeteries: Boswell, Perigo and Smith.

=== Education ===
- Benton Community School Corporation
