= Oak Grove Township, Benton County, Indiana =

Oak Grove Township
- Township
- Location of Oak Grove Township in Benton County
- Coordinates: 40°31′09″N 87°15′54″W
- Country: United States
- State: Indiana
- County: Benton
- Organized: July 1840

Government
  - Type: Indiana township

Area
  - Total: 35.53 sq mi (92.0 km^{2})
  - Land: 35.51 sq mi (92.0 km^{2})
  - Water: 0.02 sq mi (0.052 km^{2})
- Elevation: 748 ft (228 m)

Population (2020)
  - Total: 1,551
  - Density: 43.6/sq mi (16.8/km^{2})
- Time zone: UTC-5 (EST)
  - Summer (DST): UTC-4 (EDT)
- FIPS code: 18-55620
- GNIS feature ID: 453681

Oak Grove Township is one of eleven townships in Benton County, Indiana. As of the 2020 census, its population was 1,551 and it contained 690 housing units. It was one of the first three townships originally created by the county's commissioners in 1840. It takes its name from White Oak Grove which grew southwest of Oxford.

Historical population
Census	Pop.	Note	%±
1890	1,495		—
1900	1,675		12.0%
1910	1,603		−4.3%
1920	1,522		−5.1%
1930	1,430		−6.0%
1940	1,220		−14.7%
1950	1,410		15.6%
1960	1,621		15.0%
1970	1,629		0.5%
1980	1,810		11.1%
1990	1,641		−9.3%
2000	1,694		3.2%
2010	1,581		−6.7%
2020	1,551		−1.9%
Source: US Decennial Census

== Geography ==
According to the 2020 census, the township has a total area of 35.53 square miles (92.0 km^{2}), of which 35.51 square miles (92.0 km^{2}) (or 99.94%) is land and 0.02 square miles (0.052 km^{2}) (or 0.06%) is water.

=== Cities and towns ===
- Oxford

=== Adjacent townships ===
- Bolivar (east)
- Center (north)
- Grant (west)
- Pine (northeast)
- Adams Township, Warren County (southeast)
- Pine Township, Warren County (southwest)

=== Major highways ===
- U.S. Route 52
- Indiana State Road 55
- Indiana State Road 352

=== Cemeteries ===
The township contains two cemeteries: Justus and Oxford.
