= Grant Township, Newton County, Indiana =

Grant Township
- Township
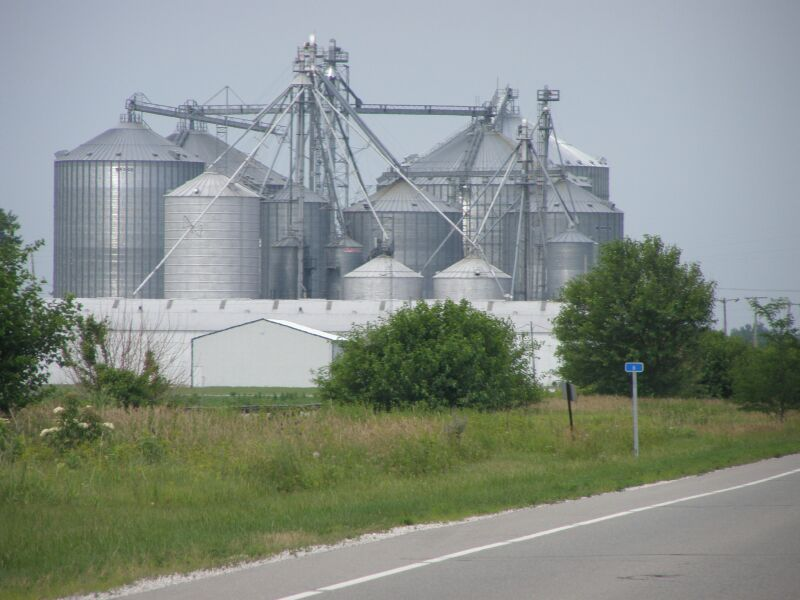
- Grain Elevator along the tracks serving western Indiana farmers

- Location in Newton County
- Coordinates: 40°47′02″N 87°19′30″W
- Country: United States
- State: Indiana
- County: Newton

Government
  - Type: Indiana township

Area
  - Total: 35.52 sq mi (92.0 km^{2})
  - Land: 35.52 sq mi (92.0 km^{2})
  - Water: 0 sq mi (0 km^{2}) 0%
- Elevation: 682 ft (208 m)

Population (2020)
  - Total: 1,100
  - Density: 31/sq mi (12/km^{2})
- Time zone: UTC-6 (Central (CST))
  - Summer (DST): UTC-5 (CDT)
- ZIP codes: 47922, 47948, 47951
- Area code: 219
- GNIS feature ID: 453337

Grant Township is one of ten townships in Newton County, Indiana, United States. As of the 2020 census, its population was 1,100 and it contained 513 housing units.

Historical population
Census	Pop.	Note	%±
1890	1,624		—
1900	1,716		5.7%
1910	1,762		2.7%
1920	1,734		−1.6%
1930	1,585		−8.6%
1940	1,656		4.5%
1950	1,702		2.8%
1960	1,716		0.8%
1970	1,570		−8.5%
1980	1,567		−0.2%
1990	1,341		−14.4%
2000	1,293		−3.6%
2010	1,189		−8.0%
2020	1,100		−7.5%
Source: US Decennial Census

== History ==
Grant Township was founded in 1865, and named for Ulysses S. Grant.

== Geography ==
According to the 2010 census, the township has a total area of 35.52 square miles (92.0 km^{2}), all land.

=== Cities, towns, villages ===
- Goodland

=== Unincorporated towns ===
(This list is based on USGS data and may include former settlements.)

=== Cemeteries ===
The township contains these two cemeteries: Goodland and Mount Calvary.

=== Major highways ===
- U.S. Route 24

== Education ==
- South Newton School Corporation

Grant Township is served by the Goodland-Grant Township Public Library.

== Political districts ==
- Indiana's 1st congressional district
- State House District 15
- State Senate District 6
