= List of ghost towns in Indiana =

The United States state of Indiana has many former, abandoned, or ghost towns. A study concluded there were at least forty one, two of which were "drowned towns".

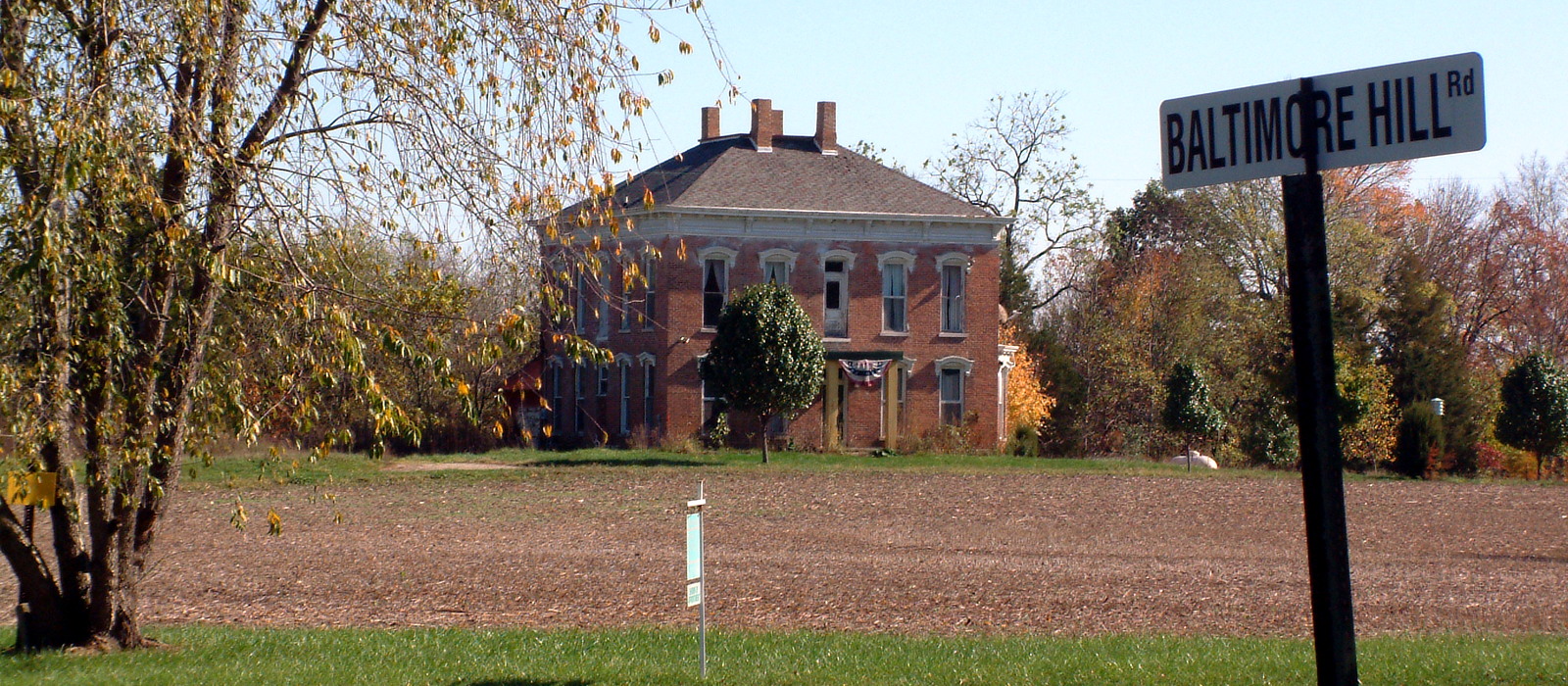
The sole remaining house in Baltimore, Indiana

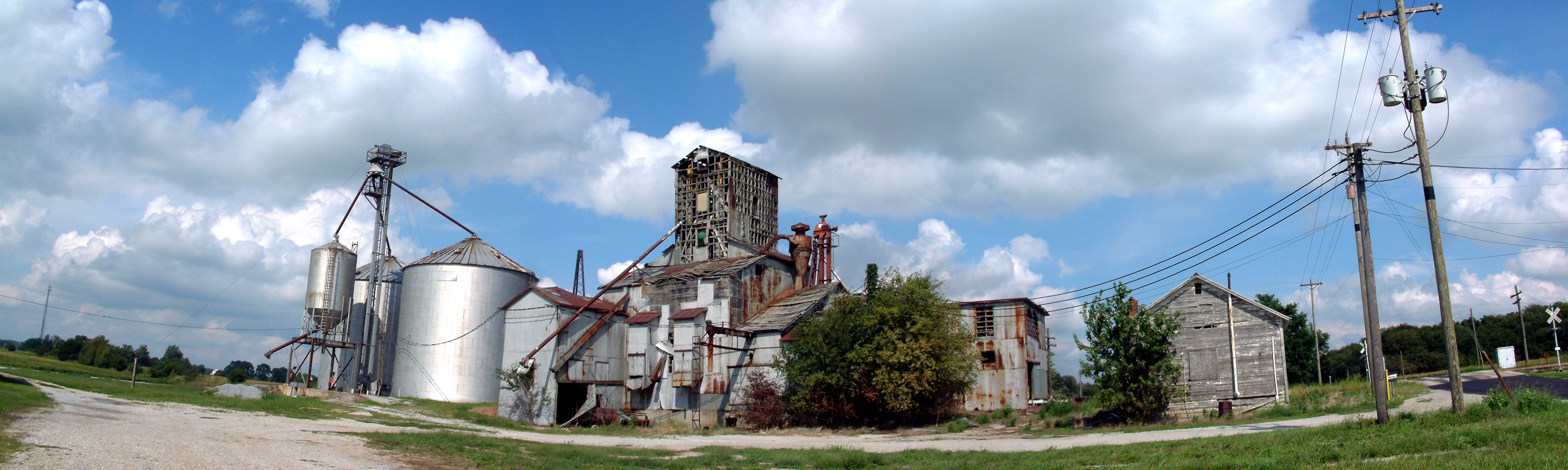
Abandoned grain elevators at Corwin, Indiana

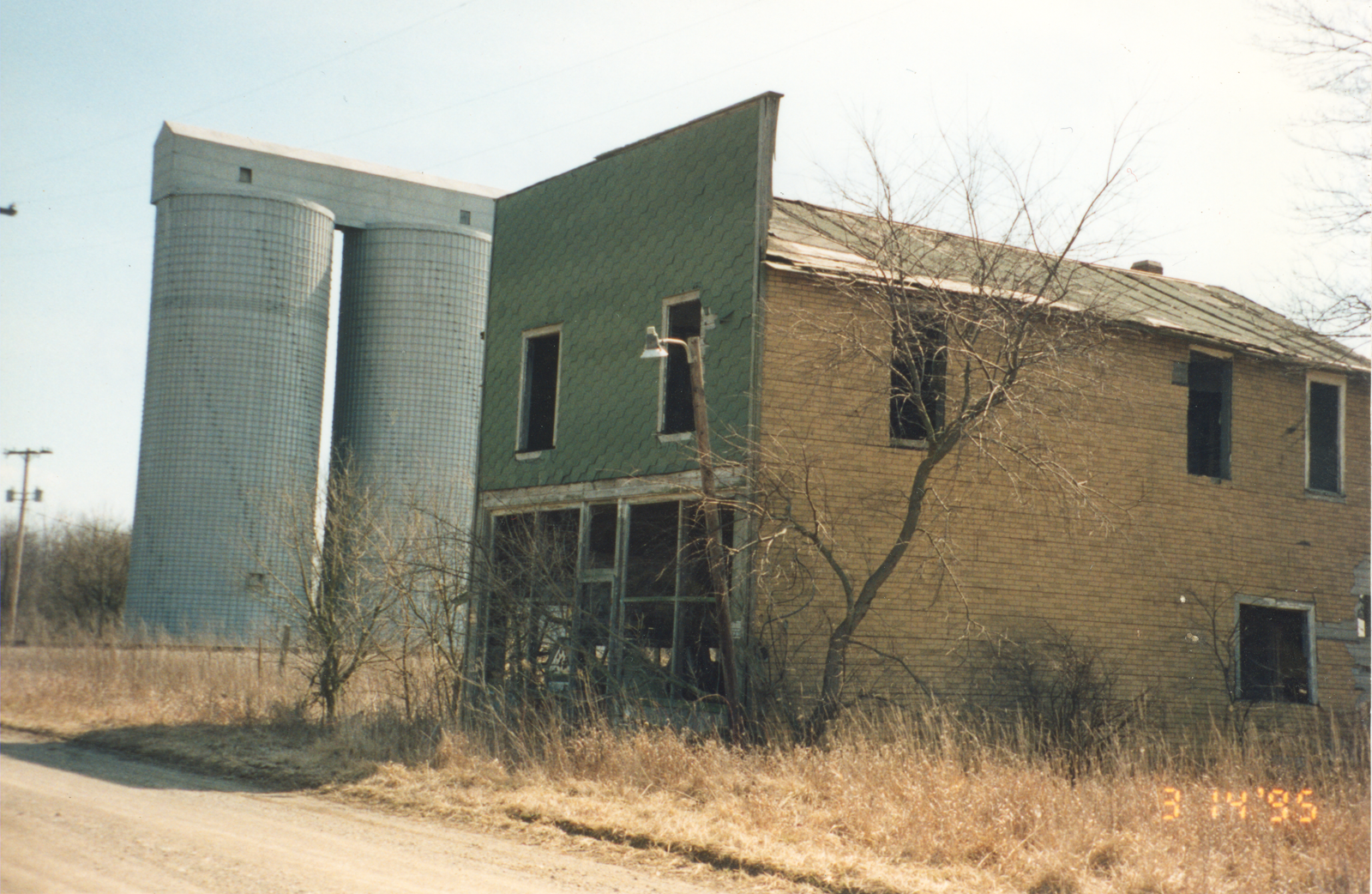
An abandoned building and grain silos in Sloan, Indiana

== Ghost towns ==
Town name	Other name(s)	County	Established	Disestablished	Remarks
Anita		Johnson			
Baltimore		Warren			
Barbersville		Jefferson			
Beeville		Tippecanoe			
Berlin		Clinton			
Bowser Station		Blackford			
Brayton		Hendricks			
Brisco	Briscoe	Warren			
Chatterton		Warren			
Chesapeake		Warren			
Conrad		Newton			
Corwin		Henry			
Corwin		Tippecanoe			
Dorsey Station		Blackford			
Depauw		Harrison			
Dresser		Warren			
Dunn		Benton			
Elkinsville		Brown			
Elizabeth		Harrison			
Elizabethtown		Delaware			
Fort Ritner		Lawrence			
Frog Alley		Blackford			
Glen Hall	Glenhall	Tippecanoe			
Granville		Tippecanoe			
Greenland		Blackford			
Heath		Tippecanoe			
Hindostan Falls		Martin			
Indiana City		Lake			Town was planned but never built.
Kickapoo		Warren			
Lick Creek	Lick Creek African Settlement, Lick Creek African-American Settlement	Orange			
Little Chicago		Blackford			
Locust Grove		Warren			
Luck		Blackford			
Magnet		Perry			
Marshfield		Scott			
Mattsville		Hamilton			
Mauckport		Harrison			
Mollie		Blackford			
Monument City		Huntington			
New Amsterdam		Harrison			
Old Leavenworth					Moved to Leavenworth.
Pleasantdale		Blackford			
Point Pleasant		Warren			
Prairieville		Clinton			
Quaker	Quaker Point	Vermillion			
Randall		Vermillion			
Renner		Blackford			
Sheff		Benton			
Silas		Blackford			
Sloan		Warren			
Slocum		Blackford			
Springville		Clark			
Stringtown		Fountain			
Suman		Porter			
Toronto		Vermillion			
Tremont	New City West	Porter			Now a part of Indiana Dunes State Park
Tunnelton		Lawrence			
Vermont		Howard			
Walnut Grove		Warren			
Warrenton		Warren			
West Union		Knox			Owned by Shakers.
Winterhurst		Blackford			
Wynnsboro		Harrison			

== See also ==
- Barce, Indiana
- Story, Indiana
- Lost communities of Porter County, Indiana
