= Talbot, Indiana =

- Unincorporated community
- Benton County's location in Indiana

- Talbot's location in Benton County
- Coordinates: 40°30′19″N 87°27′15″W
- Country: United States
- State: Indiana
- County: Benton
- Township: Hickory Grove
- Platted: February 18, 1873
- Founded by: Ezekiel and Marietta Talbot
- Elevation: 768 ft (234 m)
- Time zone: UTC-5 (CST)
  - Summer (DST): UTC-4 (CDT)
- ZIP code: 47944
- Area code: 765
- FIPS code: 18-74834
- GNIS feature ID: 444550

Talbot is an unincorporated community in Hickory Grove Township, Benton County, in the U.S. state of Indiana. It is part of the Lafayette, Indiana Metropolitan Statistical Area.

== History ==
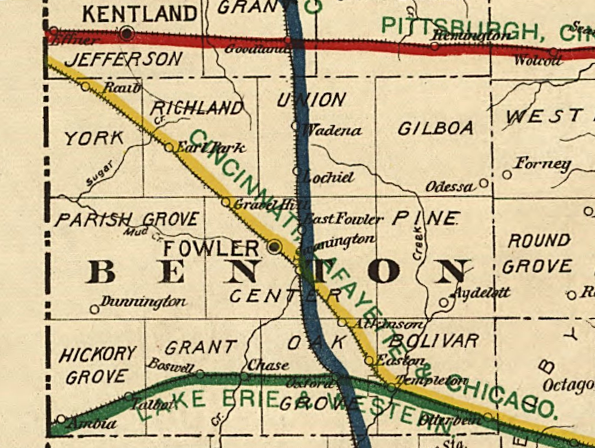
Benton County Railroad Map, circa 1896, showing the location of Talbot

The town of Talbot was laid out by Ezekiel M. Talbot (chief engineer of the LM&B Railroad) and his wife Marietta on February 18, 1873, the plat consisting of 71 lots. The couple would also lay out the nearby town of Ambia two years later. In the 1920s, Talbot had a population of about 200, plus a Methodist church, grain elevator, grade school and eight to ten businesses.

A post office was established at Talbot in 1873, and remained in operation until it was discontinued in 1995.

== Geography ==
Talbot is located at 40°30′19″N 87°27′15″W in Hickory Grove Township and is surrounded by open, fertile farmland. The Kankakee, Beaverville and Southern Railroad passes through the town, and intersects the short Bee Line Railroad a mile to the west at a point known as Handy.
