= Dunnington, Indiana =

- Unincorporated community
- Benton County's location in Indiana

- Dunnington's location in Benton County
- Coordinates: 40°33′51″N 87°29′27″W
- Country: United States
- State: Indiana
- County: Benton
- Township: Parish Grove
- Elevation: 768 ft (234 m)
- Time zone: UTC-5 (Eastern (EST))
  - Summer (DST): UTC-4 (EDT)
- ZIP code: 47944
- Area code: 765
- FIPS code: 18-19126
- GNIS feature ID: 433799

Dunnington is a small unincorporated community in Parish Grove Township, Benton County, in the U.S. state of Indiana.

== History ==
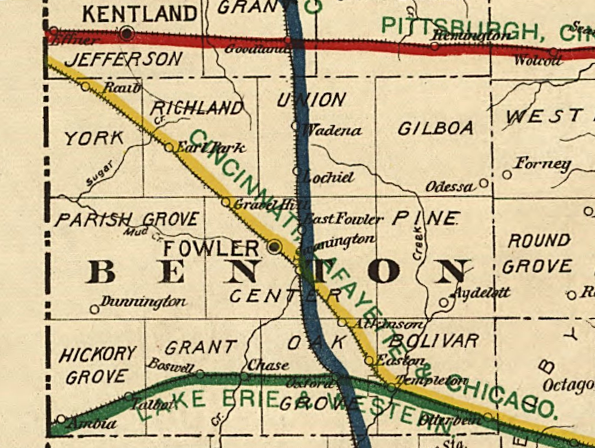
Benton County Railroad Map, circa 1896, showing the location of Dunnington

Named for Capt. James Dunn, it stands about one and a half miles west of its smaller sister town, Dunn. A post office was established at Dunnington in 1888, and was discontinued in 1903. In the early 20th century it supported a Catholic church and school, a general store, a Forresters lodge and about half a dozen residences (an estimate similar to the town's current size). St. Mary's Catholic Church, established in the late 19th century, was renovated in the early 1950s and was home to St. Mary's Catholic School, which closed in the late 1960s. Bishop Timothy Doherty has since announced that the church is to be destroyed, citing safety and financial concerns. While there were futile efforts to save the church, they failed.

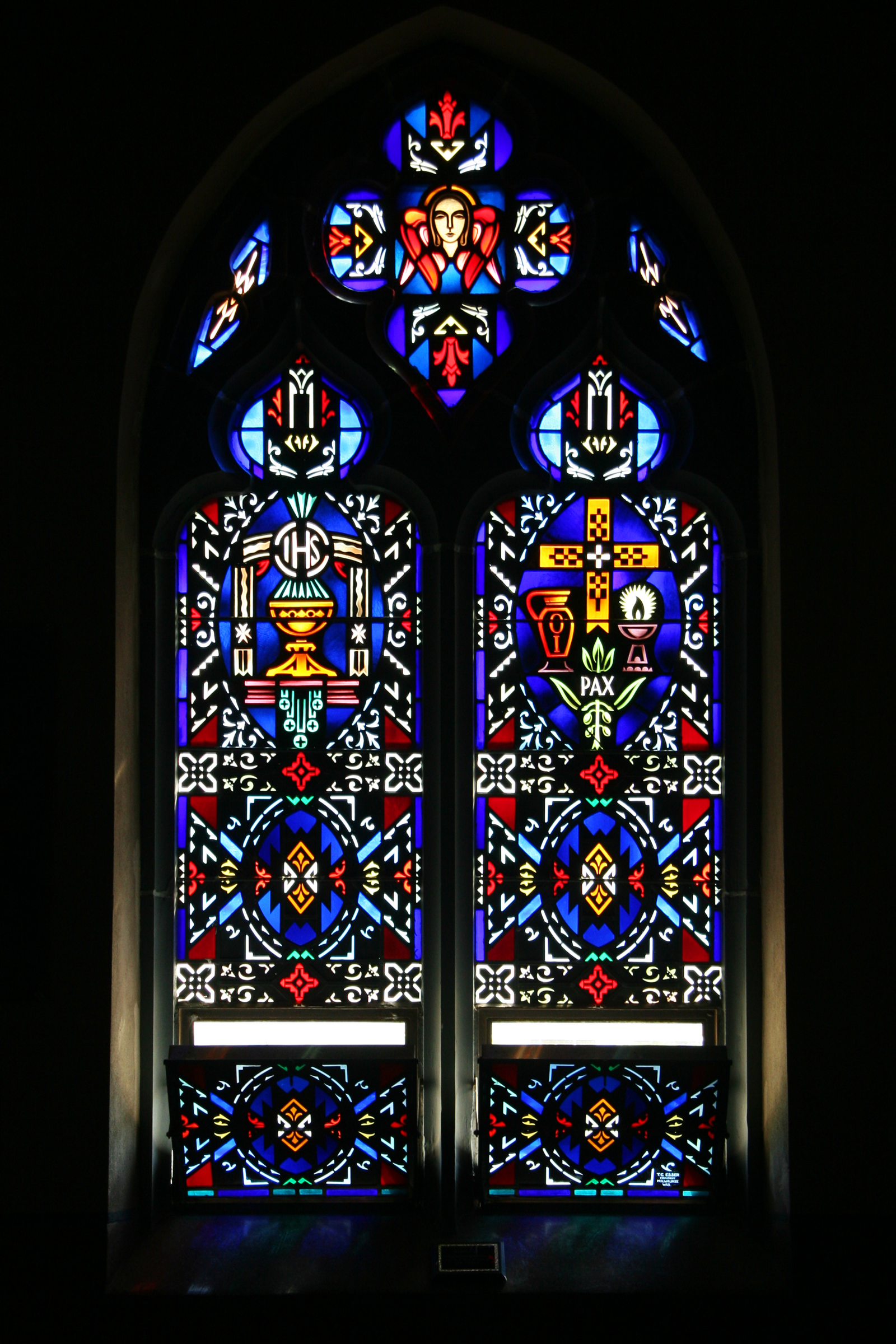
Stained glass in St. Mary's Catholic Church

== Geography ==
Dunnington is located at 40°33′51″N 87°29′27″W, on the border of Parish Grove Township and Hickory Grove Township, two miles east of the border with Illinois. Indiana State Road 71 passes north through the town, and a small creek named Kunt Ditch flows northwest toward Mud Creek.

== Notable people ==
- George Gick, baseball player.
