= Sheff =

Sheff may refer to:

People:

- David Sheff, American author of books
- Don Sheff (born 1931), American former competition swimmer
- Robert Nathan Sheff (born 1945), avant-garde composer and pianist
- Stanley Sheff, Hollywood-born director and writer
- Will Sheff (born 1976), the frontman for the Austin, Texas-based indie band Okkervil River

Other:

- Sheff, Indiana, an extinct town
- Sheffield, a city in England, sometimes called 'Sheff'
- Sheff v. O'Neill, a 1989 lawsuit and the subsequent 1996 Connecticut Supreme Court case
- Gluskin Sheff (TSX: GS), a Canadian independent wealth management firm

== See also ==
- Sheff. Star or Sheffield Star, a daily newspaper published in Sheffield, England
- Sheff U or Sheffield United F.C., professional football club in Sheffield, South Yorkshire, England
- Sheff Wed or Sheffield Wednesday F.C., football club in Sheffield, South Yorkshire, England
- Scheff
