= Sloan, Indiana =

- Ghost town
- Location in Warren County
- Coordinates: 40°18′06″N 87°28′34″W
- Country: United States
- State: Indiana
- County: Warren
- Township: Steuben
- Elevation: 712 ft (217 m)
- Time zone: UTC-5 (Eastern (EST))
  - Summer (DST): UTC-4 (EDT)
- ZIP code: 47993
- Area code: 765
- GNIS feature ID: 443611

Sloan is an extinct town that was located on the border of Jordan Township and Steuben Township in Warren County, Indiana, less than a mile east of the town of Hedrick.

== History ==
In 1903 the New York Central Railroad line through Jordan Township was completed, and on June 18, 1914, a post office was established next to the railway at the township's southern edge. Named for the local Sloan family, it operated until November 29, 1941. The railroad, which by the time of its closure was owned by Conrail, ceased operations in the 1990s, and the tracks have since been removed. No structures remain at the site. The USGS still has data for Sloan, even though it no longer exists.

A portion of the railroad, beginning less than four miles north in the town of Stewart, continues to operate as the Bee Line Railroad.

== Geography ==
Sloan was at the intersection of county roads 100 S and 825 W. Redwood Creek passes close by to its west and south.
