= Indiana State Road 352 =

Highway in Indiana, United States

State Road 352
- SR 352 highlighted in red

Route information
- Maintained by INDOT
- Length: 20.554 mi (33.078 km)
- Existed: 1935–present

Major junctions
- West end: SR 26 / IL 9 south of Ambia
- US 41 at Boswell
- East end: US 52 east of Oxford

Location
- Country: United States
- State: Indiana
- Counties: Benton, Warren

Highway system
- Indiana State Highway System; Interstate; US; State; Scenic
← SR 350	→ SR 356

State Road 352 (SR 352) is an east–west state road in Indiana, United States. The western terminus is at an intersection with Illinois Route 9 and Indiana State Road 26. The highway heads north then turns eastwards, passing through Ambia, Boswell, and Oxford before ending at U.S. Route 52 (US 52), near Templeton. The road covers a distance of about 20 miles (32 km), passing through mostly rural areas in Benton and Warren counties.

The originally designated road along modern SR 352 was SR 6 and SR 10, running between Boswell and US 52. In the mid-1920s SR 22 was commissioned along a segment of the modern route of SR 352. SR 22 became SR 152 in the early 1930s. The SR 152 designation became SR 352 in the mid-1930s when US 152 was commissioned in the state. The road west of Boswell was added in the late 1930s along a more southern routing, with a reroute a year later. In the early 1960s the entire road was paved.

== Route description ==
The western terminus of SR 352 is at the Illinois border where SR 26 and Illinois Route 9 meet. SR 352 heads north along the Illinois–Indiana state line, for about a mile (1.6 km), before making a sharp curve and running along the Warren–Benton county line. The road turns north before entering the town of Ambia. In town the road passes through residential areas and crosses a Kankakee, Beaverville and Southern Railroad track. North of the railroad track SR 253 makes a sharp curve and parallels the tracks for a short distance, before SR 352 takes another sharp turning north. SR 352 takes one last sharp curve turning east, SR 352 proceeds directly east, passing through southern end of SR 71. As the highway heads east towards the town of Boswell it passes through agricultural land. In Boswell SR 352 passes through residential areas, before an intersection with US 41.

After US 41, SR 352 leaves Boswell, heading east towards Oxford, passing through farmland and parallel to the Kankakee, Beaverville and Southern Railroad track. SR 352 enters the town of Oxford and begins a concurrency with SR 55. The concurrency heads east before turning north onto Justus Street. SR 55 and SR 352 head north on Justus Street for a block before turning east onto McConnell Street passing downtown Oxford. McConnell Street ends at Michigan Street with SR 55 turning north and SR 352 turning south onto Michigan Street. SR 352 heads south concurrent with Michigan Street for a block before turning east and leaving Oxford. East of Oxford SR 352 heads east passing through agricultural land, before crossing another railroad track owned by Kankakee, Beaverville and Southern Railroad. The eastern end of SR 352 is at an intersection with US 52, northwest of Templeton, the roadway continues east as Benton County Road 600 South. The highest traffic count on SR 352 is between Oxford and US 52, where 2,175 vehicles travel the highway on average each day. The lowest traffic count on SR 352 is south of Ambia, where 200 vehicles travel the highway on average each day.

== History ==
Prior to 1926 modern SR 352 was part of SR 10 between Boswell and where SR 10 turned north, east of Boswell, after SR 10 turned north SR 6 continued east along modern SR 352 to Templeton. In 1926 SR 22 was commissioned along the modern route of SR 352 between Boswell and Templeton. In that year SR 22 was also proposed between Illinois state line and Boswell following a similar routing as SR 352 does today. Between 1928 and 1929 the proposed route of SR 22 between Illinois state line and Boswell moved south to modern SR 26. SR 152 was commissioned to replace SR 22 between US 41, now Old Highway 41, and US 52, now Old U.S. 52, between late 1930 and early 1932.

In 1935 the Indiana State Highway Commission renumbered SR 152 to SR 352 due to US 152 being commissioned in the state. In that year SR 352 between SR 26, south of Ambia, and Boswell was proposed. SR 352 commissioned between Illinois state line, northwest of Ambia and Boswell, passing through Handy and Talbot, between 1937 and 1938. By 1939 SR 352 was moved to its modern routing between SR 26 and Boswell. Between 1962 and 1963 entire paved and the western end of SR 352 was moved to the Illinois state line between SR 26 and Ambia. The western end of SR 352 was moved back to its current end point at SR 26 between 2001 and 2002.

== Major intersections ==
County	Location	mi	km	Destinations	Notes
Warren–Vermilion county line	Indiana–Illinois line	0.000	0.000	IL 9 west / SR 26 east	Western terminus; road continues south as State Line Road
Warren	No major junctions				
Benton	Hickory Grove Township	5.783	9.307	SR 71 north	Southern terminus of SR 71
Benton	Boswell	11.829	19.037	US 41 – Attica, Kentland	
Benton	Oxford	18.205	29.298	SR 55 south – Pine Village	Western end of SR 55 concurrency
Benton	Oxford	18.765	30.199	SR 55 north	Eastern end of SR 55 concurrency
Benton	Oak Grove Township	20.554	33.078	US 52 – Lafayette, Fowler	Eastern terminus of SR 352
1.000 mi = 1.609 km; 1.000 km = 0.621 mi: Concurrency terminus
