= Jordan Township, Warren County, Indiana =

Jordan Township
- Township
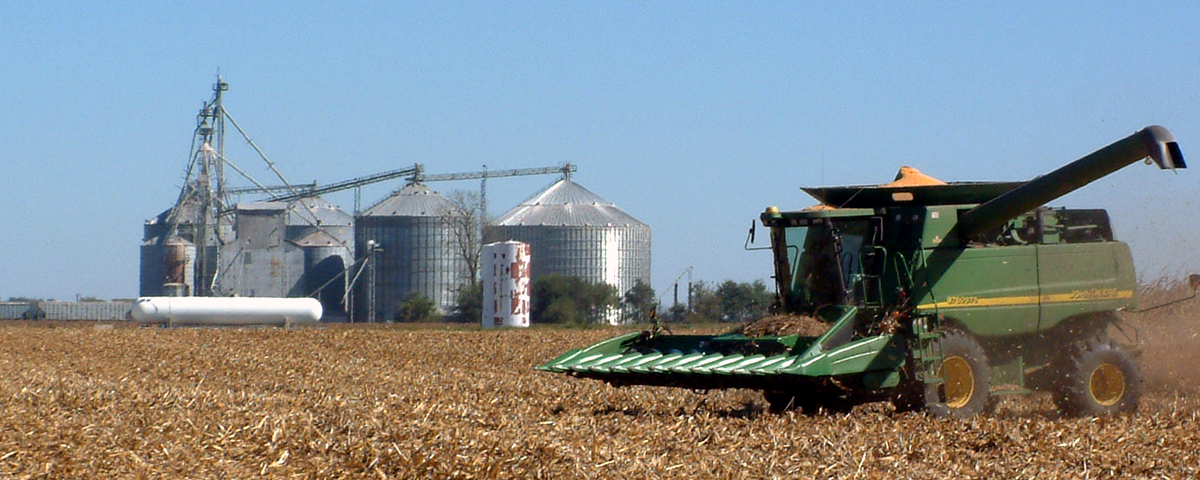
- Agricultural scene west of Stewart

- Location of Jordan Township in Warren County

- Location of Indiana in the United States
- Coordinates: 40°21′01″N 87°27′49″W
- Country: United States
- State: Indiana
- County: Warren

Government
  - Type: Indiana township

Area
  - Total: 40.56 sq mi (105.0 km^{2})
  - Land: 40.55 sq mi (105.0 km^{2})
  - Water: 0.02 sq mi (0.052 km^{2}) 0.05%
- Elevation: 709 ft (216 m)

Population (2020)
  - Total: 220
  - Density: 5.4/sq mi (2.1/km^{2})
- Time zone: UTC-5 (Eastern (EST))
  - Summer (DST): UTC-4 (EDT)
- Area code: 765
- GNIS feature ID: 453519

Jordan Township is one of twelve townships in Warren County, Indiana, United States. According to the 2020 census, its population was 220 and it contained 96 housing units. It is almost entirely agricultural and contains no incorporated towns.

Historical population
Census	Pop.	Note	%±
1890	577		—
1900	683		18.4%
1910	844		23.6%
1920	702		−16.8%
1930	767		9.3%
1940	600		−21.8%
1950	544		−9.3%
1960	493		−9.4%
1970	428		−13.2%
1980	364		−15.0%
1990	313		−14.0%
2000	254		−18.8%
2010	247		−2.8%
2020	220		−10.9%
Source: US Decennial Census

== History ==
Jordan Township was created in 1850 from a section of the adjacent Liberty Township. At this time the land was marshy and not considered very good for farming, and was used largely for grazing livestock. Starting around 1880, some of the higher ground began to be farmed, and as the population increased this was expanded. The grain grown was either fed to livestock or hauled by wagon to elevators at Ambia, West Lebanon, or Rossville, Illinois.

== Geography ==
According to the 2010 census, the township has a total area of 40.56 square miles (105.0 km^{2}), of which 40.55 square miles (105.0 km^{2}) (or 99.98%) is land and 0.02 square miles (0.052 km^{2}) (or 0.05%) is water. The small town of Pence lies near the western edge of the township, which is also the Illinois border. An even smaller town, Stewart, is located about 2 miles (3.2 km) east of Pence and now consists mainly of a grain processing facility. Near the southern border of the township lies the town of Hedrick. The town of Sloan once existed just east of Hedrick but no buildings now remain. Likewise, the town of Sycamore Corner was 2 miles (3.2 km) east of Stewart at 40°21′36″N 87°26′04″W but is now entirely gone.

Map of Jordan Township

=== Cemeteries ===
The township's only cemetery is Jordan Cemetery. It lies just to the northeast of Pence at 40°22′1.21″N 87°30′25.05″W; the earliest marker there is from 1850.

== Education ==
Jordan Township is part of the Metropolitan School District of Warren County.

== Government ==
Jordan Township has a trustee who administers rural fire protection and ambulance service, provides relief to the poor, manages cemetery care, and performs farm assessment, among other duties. The trustee is assisted in these duties by a three-member township board. The trustees and board members are elected to four-year terms.

Jordan Township is part of Indiana's 8th congressional district, Indiana House of Representatives District 42, and Indiana State Senate District 38.
