= Sycamore Corner, Indiana =

- Ghost town
- Location in Warren County
- Coordinates: 40°21′35″N 87°26′04″W
- Country: United States
- State: Indiana
- County: Warren
- Township: Jordan
- Elevation: 725 ft (221 m)
- Time zone: UTC-5 (Eastern (EST))
  - Summer (DST): UTC-4 (EDT)
- ZIP code: 47993
- Area code: 765
- GNIS feature ID: 444509

Sycamore Corner is an extinct town that was located in Jordan Township in Warren County, Indiana, between the towns of Stewart and Judyville.

Even though the community no longer exists, it is still cited by the USGS.

== Geography ==
Sycamore Corner was at the intersection of county roads 300 North and 600 West, roughly two miles west of Judyville.
