= Raub =

Raub may refer to:

- Raub, Pahang, a town in Malaysia
- Raub (federal constituency) in Malaysia
- Raub District in Malaysia
- Raub, Indiana, a village in Indiana, USA
- Raub (crater), a crater on Mars
