= York Township, Benton County, Indiana =

York Township
- Township
- Location of York Township in Benton County
- Coordinates: 40°42′03″N 87°29′03″W
- Country: United States
- State: Indiana
- County: Benton
- Organized: June 1860

Government
  - Type: Indiana township

Area
  - Total: 27.5 sq mi (71 km^{2})
  - Land: 27.49 sq mi (71.2 km^{2})
  - Water: 0 sq mi (0 km^{2})
- Elevation: 784 ft (239 m)

Population (2020)
  - Total: 155
  - Density: 5.64/sq mi (2.18/km^{2})
- Time zone: UTC-5 (EST)
  - Summer (DST): UTC-4 (EDT)
- Area code: 219
- FIPS code: 18-85940
- GNIS feature ID: 454066

York Township is one of eleven townships in Benton County, Indiana. As of the 2020 census, its population was 155 and it contained 82 housing units. It was organized in June 1860 and named for the state of New York, the former home of local pioneer John Fleming.

Historical population
Census	Pop.	Note	%±
1890	625		—
1900	593		−5.1%
1910	550		−7.3%
1920	510		−7.3%
1930	492		−3.5%
1940	385		−21.7%
1950	342		−11.2%
1960	336		−1.8%
1970	288		−14.3%
1980	245		−14.9%
1990	224		−8.6%
2000	241		7.6%
2010	181		−24.9%
2020	155		−14.4%
Source: US Decennial Census

== Geography ==
According to the 2020 census, the township has a total area of 27.5 square miles (71 km^{2}), all land. Since 2006 the township has the latest annual sunset of any location in Indiana (every late June about a week after the solstice) when the entire eastern time zone part of Indiana for the first time was completely on day light savings time, and latest annual sunrise of any location in Indiana (in the first week of January) since 1967 when it joined Eastern time zone along with all of Benton County and many other Indiana counties.

=== Unincorporated towns ===
- Raub
- Sheff

(This list is based on USGS data and may include former settlements.)

=== Adjacent townships ===
- Parish Grove (south)
- Richland (east)
- Jefferson Township, Newton County (north)

=== Major highways ===
- U.S. Route 41
- State Road 71

=== Cemeteries ===
The township contains two cemeteries: Blue Ridge and Fleming.

== Education ==
It is in the South Newton School Corporation.

The Benton County Public Library operates the York Township Public Library.
