= Swannington =

Swannington may refer to:

- Swannington, Leicestershire
  - Swannington railway station
- Swannington, Norfolk
  - location of RAF Swannington

== See also ==
- Swanington, Indiana, U.S.
