= Barce, Indiana =

- Unincorporated community
- Benton County's location in Indiana

- Location in Benton County
- Coordinates: 40°37′15″N 87°16′36″W
- Country: United States
- State: Indiana
- County: Benton
- Township: Center
- Founded: c. 1890
- Named for: Lyman Barce
- Elevation: 810 ft (250 m)
- Time zone: UTC-5 (Eastern (EST))
  - Summer (DST): UTC-4 (EDT)
- ZIP code: 47944
- Area code: 765
- FIPS code: 18-03385
- GNIS feature ID: 430485

Barce (/bɑːrs/) is an unincorporated community in Center Township, Benton County, in the U.S. state of Indiana.

Originally known as East Fowler, a railroad station on the Chicago and Eastern Illinois Coal Railroad (C.&E.I. Coal), the platted community was renamed after Lyman Barce around 1890.

== Geography ==
Barce is located at 40°37′15″N 87°16′36″W, in sections 12 and 13 of Center Township.

== History ==
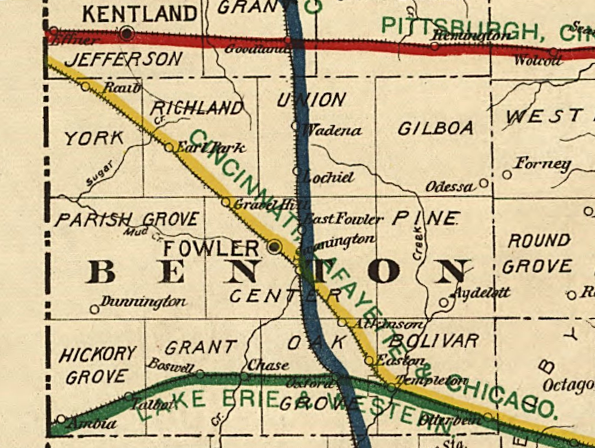
Benton County Railroad Map, circa 1896, showing the locations of Fowler and East Fowler

=== Early years ===
Barce was founded circa 1890, named after Lyman Barce.

The area was originally known as East Fowler, a railroad station on the Chicago and Eastern Illinois Coal Railroad (C.&E.I. Coal). By 1888, East Fowler was considered a town when it was listed among other Benton County communities. The T.A. Baldwin Company operated a grain elevator in East Fowler starting in March 1890.

The name of the station was changed to Barce in January 1898. Barce was platted in section 12 of Center Township.

A post office was established at Barce in 1897, and remained in operation until it was discontinued in 1907. The community was named in honor of Lyman Barce.

=== Twentieth century ===
In 1904, representatives from the "Frisco" Railway met with locals in Benton County regarding a proposed rail line running through both Fowler and Barce.

Circa 1914, daily bus service had been established between the Fowler Hotel in Fowler and the Barce railroad station.

The Stewart Cash Store operated in locations in Fowler and Barce. Charles Stewart ran the store in Barce for 20 years, from 1899 to 1919. The Barce shop was relocated to nearby Fowler in 1919, leaving Barce without a store.

Barce historical population
Year	Pop.	±%
1900	25	—
1920	21	−16.0%

The farmers and grain elevator operators in the Barce area experienced hardship in 1922 when the C. and E. I. Coal Railroad between Barce and Brook halted operations for five months. The area's residents were "facing a loss of thousands of dollars and in many cases financial ruin". Eventually, the Pennsylvania Railroad began services on the line, allowing grain to be shipped again, and averting disaster.

The railroad station built by the Evansville & Indianapolis Railroad was later used as business premises.

In 1900, Barce's population was 25. In 1908, the Indiana Department of Inspection estimated the population of Barce to be 100. In the 1920 Census, Barce's population was 21. In 1940, the population was 10.

== See also ==
- Sheff, Indiana
