= Anita, Indiana =

Extinct town in Indiana, United States

- Ghost town
- Location within Indiana Location within the United States
- Coordinates: 39°25′33″N 86°11′29″W
- Country: United States
- State: Indiana
- County: Johnson
- Township: Hensley
- Elevation: 813 ft (248 m)
- ZIP code: 46181
- FIPS code: 18-01684
- GNIS feature ID: 430180

Anita is an extinct town in Hensley Township, Johnson County, Indiana, United States.

Anita was the site of an Illinois Central Railroad passenger depot, the station house of which was moved and converted to a home near Trafalgar in 1936.

By the 1980s, Anita had been depopulated. The state highway department intended to remove it from maps, but preservationists succeeded in placing a roadside plaque to commemorate the town.

== See also ==
- List of ghost towns in Indiana
