= Indiana State Road 71 =

Highway in Indiana

State Road 71
- SR 71 highlighted in red

Route information
- Maintained by INDOT
- Length: 37.484 mi (60.325 km)
- Existed: 1932–present

Southern segment
- Length: 19.933 mi (32.079 km)
- South end: SR 163 in Blanford
- Major intersections: US 36 near Dana
- North end: SR 63 near Newport

Northern segment
- Length: 17.551 mi (28.246 km)
- South end: SR 352
- Major intersections: SR 18 near Freeland Park
- North end: US 24 / US 52 near Kentland

Location
- Country: United States
- State: Indiana
- Counties: Benton, Newton, Vermillion

Highway system
- Indiana State Highway System; Interstate; US; State; Scenic
← SR 70	→ I-74

State Road 71 (SR 71) is a north–south discontinuous state road in the west-central Indiana part of the US state of Indiana. The southern segment is completely within Vermillion County, while the northern segment is in Benton and Newton counties. The highway passes through mostly rural areas. The southern end of the southern segment is in Blanford at SR 163 before ending at SR 63 near Newport. The northern segment begins at an intersection with SR 352 near Ambia and heads north passing through the community of Raub before ending at U.S. Highway 24/U.S. Highway 52 (US 24/US 52).

The original designation of SR 71 went from SR 163 and US 36 in the early 1930s. This road was extended north to SR 63 by the mid-1940s. The northern section of SR 71 was designated in the early 1950s.

== Route description ==
=== Southern section ===
The southern segment of SR 71 is 20 miles (32 km) long and is entirely within Vermillion County. The road heads north from its southern terminus at SR 163, in the town of Blanford. SR 71 passes through the town before entering rural Vermillion County, parallel to the Illinois-Indiana state line. The road passes through the town of St. Bernice, before curving to become east–west. Soon after becoming east-west SR 71 curves again to become north–south before an intersection with U.S. Highway 36 (US 36). North of US 36, SR 71 passes through Dana before returning to rural Vermillion County. After Dana SR 71 becomes takes several curves heading generally towards the northeast before an intersection with SR 63, northwest of Newport. This intersection is the northern terminus of the southern segment of SR 71. INDOT's surveys in 2016 showed that the highest traffic levels along the southern segment of SR 71 were the 1,518 vehicles daily between US 36 and Dana; the lowest counts were the 426 vehicles per day north of the Dana.

=== Northern section ===
The northern segment of SR 71 is 17.5 miles (28.2 km) long in Benton and Newton Counties. The southern terminus is at SR 352 near the town of Ambia. SR 71 heads north passing through farms and fields, before passing through an intersection with SR 18. North of SR 18 the road takes a few curves, while the road continues to the north. The road passes through the town of Raub where it crosses the Kankakee, Beaverville and Southern Railroad. North of Raub the road crosses a railroad track before the SR 71 designation ends at an intersection with US 24/US 52 west of Kentland. INDOT's surveys in 2017 showed that the highest traffic levels along the northern segment of SR 71 were the 264 vehicles daily near its intersection with US 24/US 52; the lowest counts were the 147 vehicles per day north of the SR 18.

== History ==
The first SR 71 designation in Indiana was in 1932 between SR 163 and US 36. This segment was paved by 1937. Between 1942 and 1945 the SR 71 designation was extended to SR 63. The northern segment of SR 71 was added to the state road system in either 1950 or 1951. This section of SR 71 between Dana and SR 63 and from Raub to US 24/US 52 was paved in either 1966 or 1967. The final part of SR 71 to be paved was from SR 352 to Raub and it was paved between 1977 and 1979.

== Major intersections ==
County	Location	mi	km	Destinations	Notes
Vermillion	Blanford	0.000	0.000	SR 163 – Clinton	Southern terminus
Vermillion	Helt Township	10.418	16.766	US 36 – Montezuma, Chrisman IL	
Vermillion	Vermillion Township	19.933	32.079	SR 63 – I-74, Terre Haute	Northern terminus of southern section
Gap in route
Benton	Hickory Grove Township	19.934	32.081	SR 352 – Oxford	Southern end of the northern section
Benton	Parish Grove Township	26.955	43.380	SR 18 – Fowler	
Newton	Jefferson Township	37.484	60.325	US 24 / US 52 – Kentland, Sheldon IL	Northern terminus
1.000 mi = 1.609 km; 1.000 km = 0.621 mi
