= Boswell, Indiana =

- Town
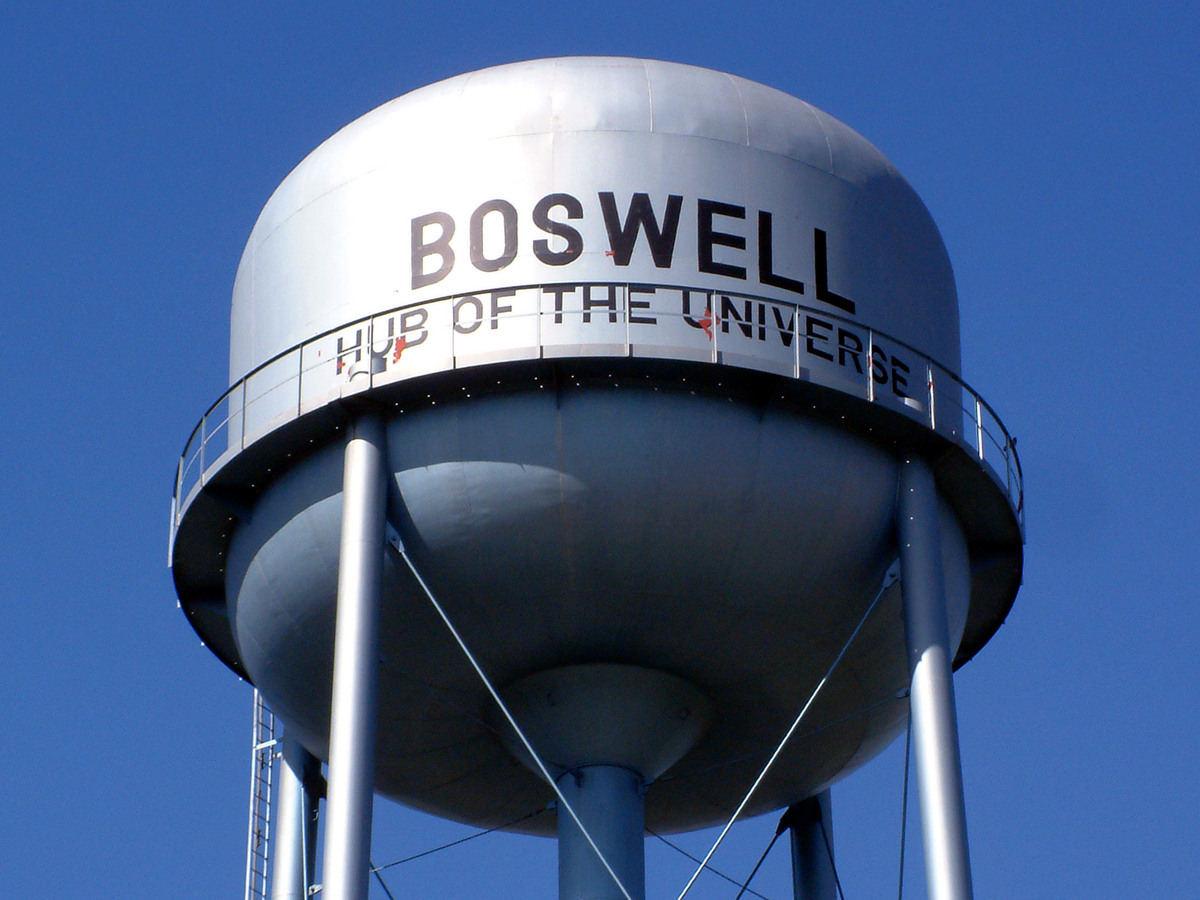

- Logo
- Motto: "Hub of the Universe"
- Location of Boswell in Benton County, Indiana.

- Boswell's location in Benton County
- Coordinates: 40°31′02″N 87°22′31″W
- Country: United States
- State: Indiana
- County: Benton
- Township: Grant
- Founded: 1872

Area
  - Total: 0.88 sq mi (2.29 km^{2})
  - Land: 0.88 sq mi (2.29 km^{2})
  - Water: 0 sq mi (0.00 km^{2})
- Elevation: 755 ft (230 m)

Population (2020)
  - Total: 800
  - Density: 905.0/sq mi (349.41/km^{2})
- Time zone: UTC-5 (EST)
  - Summer (DST): UTC-4 (EDT)
- ZIP code: 47921
- Area code: 765
- FIPS code: 18-06706
- GNIS ID: 2396598
- Website: www.townofboswell.com

Boswell is a town in Grant Township, Benton County, Indiana, United States. The population was 800 at the 2020 census. It is part of the Lafayette, Indiana Metropolitan Statistical Area.

== History ==
The town of Boswell was first laid out by Charles Moore, but Moore sold the land it occupied to Tippecanoe County-native Elizabeth H. Scott who, with her husband Charles, replatted it in its present form on July 18, 1872. A small general store run from a "rough board shanty" just north of the railroad was the town's first business, but this was joined by many more as the town grew. The town was named for Parnaham Boswell and was platted with streets bearing the names of the founders, Charles and Elizabeth, and their five children, Grace, Emma, Clinton, Harold and Jennie.

== Geography ==
Boswell is located in Grant Township. U.S. Route 41 passes along the east side of Boswell; State Road 352 and the Kankakee, Beaverville and Southern Railroad both run east through town. Goose Creek flows along Boswell's south side and joins Mud Pine Creek about two miles to the southeast.

According to the 2010 census, Boswell has a total area of 0.93 square miles (2.41 km^{2}), all land.

== Government and public safety ==
The town's business is presided over by a three-person town board and a town clerk. These positions are elected every four years.

The town of Boswell employs a full-time town marshal. The Marshal is charged with providing law enforcement service in the town limits and surrounding area. The town marshal is a sworn police officer under Indiana statute.

== Demographics ==
Historical population
Census	Pop.	Note	%±
1880	330		—
1890	558		69.1%
1900	824		47.7%
1910	814		−1.2%
1920	880		8.1%
1930	817		−7.2%
1940	877		7.3%
1950	963		9.8%
1960	957		−0.6%
1970	998		4.3%
1980	810		−18.8%
1990	767		−5.3%
2000	827		7.8%
2010	778		−5.9%
2020	800		2.8%
U.S. Decennial Census

=== 2010 census ===
As of the 2010 census, there were 778 people, 310 households, and 205 families living in the town. The population density was 836.6 inhabitants per square mile (323.0/km^{2}). There were 362 housing units at an average density of 389.2 units per square mile (150.3 units/km^{2}). The racial makeup of the town was 87.9% White, 0.6% African American, 0.3% Native American, 0.1% Asian, 10.2% from other races, and 0.9% from two or more races. Hispanic or Latino of any race were 15.0% of the population.

There were 310 households, of which 33.2% had children under the age of 18 living with them, 47.4% were married couples living together, 13.5% had a female householder with no husband present, 5.2% had a male householder with no wife present, and 33.9% were non-families. 30.0% of all households were made up of individuals, and 16.1% had someone living alone who was 65 years of age or older. The average household size was 2.51 and the average family size was 3.08.

The median age in the town was 38.1 years. 27.6% of residents were under the age of 18; 5.9% were between the ages of 18 and 24; 28.3% were from 25 to 44; 22% were from 45 to 64; and 16.2% were 65 years of age or older. The gender makeup of the town was 47.9% male and 52.1% female.

=== 2000 census ===
As of the 2000 census, there were 827 people, 329 households, and 224 families living in the town. The population density was 1,743.3 inhabitants per square mile (673.1/km^{2}). There were 361 housing units at an average density of 761.0 units per square mile (293.8 units/km^{2}). The racial makeup of the town was 92.14% White, 0.24% African American, 0.24% Native American, 0.24% Asian, 4.84% from other races, and 2.30% from two or more races. Hispanic or Latino of any race were 9.79% of the population.

There were 329 households, out of which 31.3% had children under the age of 18 living with them, 54.1% were married couples living together, 10.6% had a female householder with no husband present, and 31.9% were non-families. 28.3% of all households were made up of individuals, and 17.6% had someone living alone who was 65 years of age or older. The average household size was 2.51 and the average family size was 3.08.

In the town, the population was spread out, with 28.7% under the age of 18, 6.4% from 18 to 24, 28.2% from 25 to 44, 16.7% from 45 to 64, and 20.1% who were 65 years of age or older. The median age was 36 years. For every 100 females, there were 85.0 males. For every 100 females age 18 and over, there were 81.0 males.

The median income for a household in the town was $33,224, and the median income for a family was $36,136. Males had a median income of $28,839 versus $19,792 for females. The per capita income for the town was $14,401. About 5.5% of families and 8.3% of the population were below the poverty line, including 7.2% of those under age 18 and 3.9% of those age 65 or over.

== Education ==
It is in the Benton Community School Corporation. The children of Boswell, Indiana attend Prairie Crossing Elementary School, and then Benton Central Jr-Sr High School (the sole comprehensive secondary school in the district).

Previously there was Boswell Elementary School (closed at end of May 2021). The area was rezoned to Prairie Crossing ES.

The town has a lending library, the Boswell Public Library.
