= Raub, Indiana =

- Unincorporated community
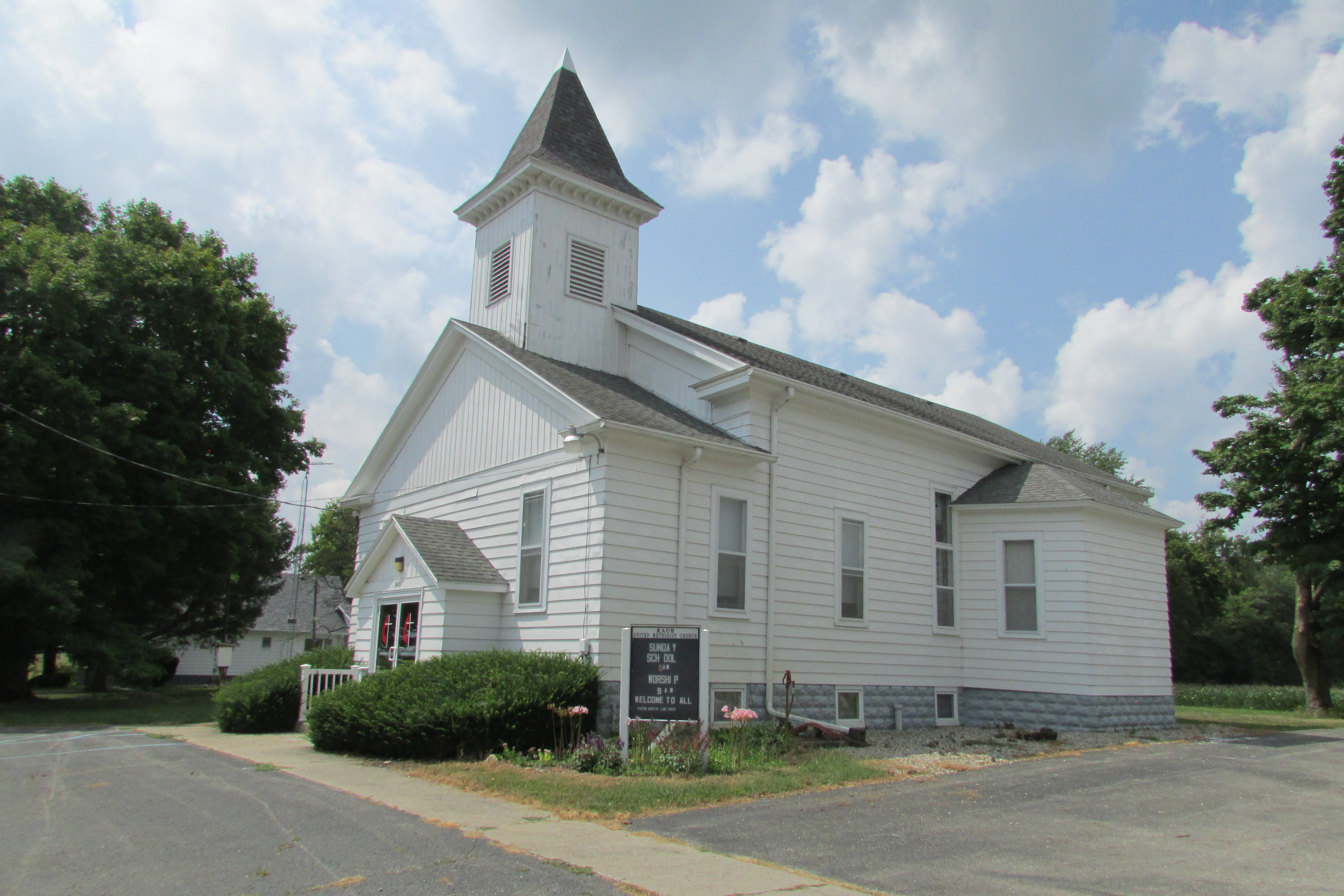
- United Methodist Church in Raub, Indiana

- Benton County's location in Indiana

- Raub's location in Benton County
- Coordinates: 40°43′48″N 87°29′30″W
- Country: United States
- State: Indiana
- County: Benton
- Township: York
- Platted: April 8, 1872
- Named after: Adams D. Raub

Area
  - Total: 0.085 sq mi (0.22 km^{2})
  - Land: 0.085 sq mi (0.22 km^{2})
  - Water: 0 sq mi (0.00 km^{2})
- Elevation: 732 ft (223 m)

Population (2020)
  - Total: 53
  - Density: 612.7/sq mi (236.55/km^{2})
- Time zone: UTC-5 (Eastern (EST))
  - Summer (DST): UTC-4 (EDT)
- ZIP code: 47942
- Area code: 219
- FIPS code: 18-63072
- GNIS feature ID: 441790

Raub is an unincorporated community in York Township, Benton County, in the U.S. state of Indiana. As of the 2020 census, Raub had a population of 53. It is part of the Lafayette, Indiana Metropolitan Statistical Area.

== History ==
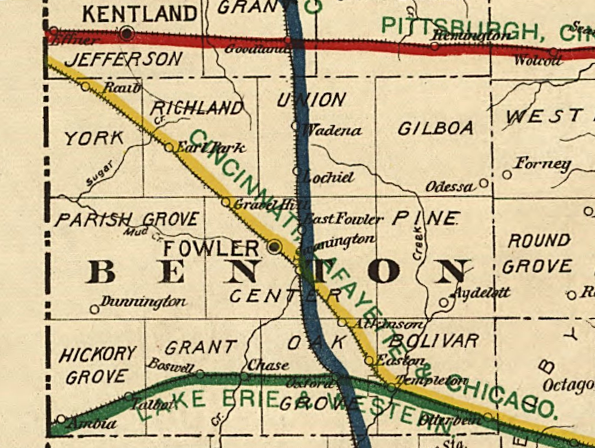
Benton County Railroad Map, circa 1896, showing the location of Raub

Raub was laid out by merchant and livestock-dealer Adams D. Raub on April 8, 1872 near the railroad which had been completed through the area the previous year. Originally consisting of 71 lots, its first house was that of Ira Perkins (which predated the railroad), followed by that of A. Houser in the fall of 1871. At about the same time, Raub gained its first store, a business selling groceries and notions, and in 1873 got a general store operated by Samuel White. A hardware store, drug store, saloon, doctor's office, grain elevator, blacksmith, and various other establishments followed over the next decade.

A post office was established at Raub in 1872, and remained in operation until it was discontinued in 1967.

The first organized religious service started about the same time Raub was laid out, in 1872. The first minister was a Circuit Rider named W.H. Hickman. In 1875, the group that Rev. Hickman ministered to, formed the Raub Evangelical United Brethren Church and commissioned contractor J.H. Bradshaw or Lafayette, IN to build the structure that is still in use today by the Raub United Methodist Church. The Evangelical United Brethren Church joined with the Methodist Church in 1968 and with that merger, the people of the church remained while the name changed slightly.

== Geography ==
Raub is located at 40°43′48″N 87°29′30″W in York Township, at the intersection of Indiana State Road 71 and the Kankakee, Beaverville and Southern Railroad. The site is half a mile from the border with Newton County and is surrounded by relatively flat, open farmland.

== Demographics ==
Historical population
Census	Pop.	Note	%±
1890	100		—
1900	108		8.0%
1920	258		—
1960	100		—
2020	53		—
U.S. Decennial Census

In 1890, Raub's population was 100. The community's population was 108 in 1900. In 1920, Raub's population was 258.

In 1960, the population of the community was 100. In 2020, the population of Raub was 53.

== Education ==
It is in the South Newton School Corporation.

The Benton County Public Library operates the York Township Public Library in Raub.
