= George Gick =

American baseball player (1915–2008)

- Pitcher
- Born: October 18, 1915; Dunnington, Indiana, U.S.
- Died: August 12, 2008 (aged 92); Lafayette, Indiana, U.S.
- Batted: Both Threw: Right

MLB debut
- October 3, 1937, for the Chicago White Sox

Last MLB appearance
- April 21, 1938, for the Chicago White Sox

MLB statistics
- Win–loss record: 0–0
- Earned run average: 0.00
- Strikeouts: 2
- Stats at Baseball Reference

Teams
- Chicago White Sox (1937–1938)

George Edward Gick (October 18, 1915 – August 12, 2008) was an American right-handed relief pitcher in Major League Baseball who played for the Chicago White Sox for one game each in the 1937 and 1938 seasons. Listed at 6' 0", 190 lb., he was a switch-hitter. He was born in Dunnington, Indiana.

In his two major league appearances – on October 3, 1937 against the St. Louis Browns and on April 21, 1938 against the Detroit Tigers – Gick posted a perfect 0.00 earned run average with one save and two strikeouts in 3 innings pitched without a decision.

Gick died on August 12, 2008, at the age of 92.
