= Dunn, Indiana =

- Extinct town
- Benton County's location in Indiana

- Dunn's location in Benton County
- Coordinates: 40°33′50″N 87°27′50″W
- Country: United States
- State: Indiana
- County: Benton
- Township: Hickory Grove
- Elevation: 797 ft (243 m)
- Time zone: UTC-5 (Eastern (EST))
  - Summer (DST): UTC-4 (EDT)
- ZIP code: 47944
- Area code: 765
- FIPS code: 18-19108
- GNIS feature ID: 433791

Dunn is an extinct town in Hickory Grove Township, Benton County, in the U.S. state of Indiana.

Named for Capt. James Dunn, it stands about one and a half miles east of Dunnington. In the 1920s it had two general stores, a grain elevator and about half a dozen residences. The post office at Dunn was established in 1907 and discontinued in 1913.

== Geography ==
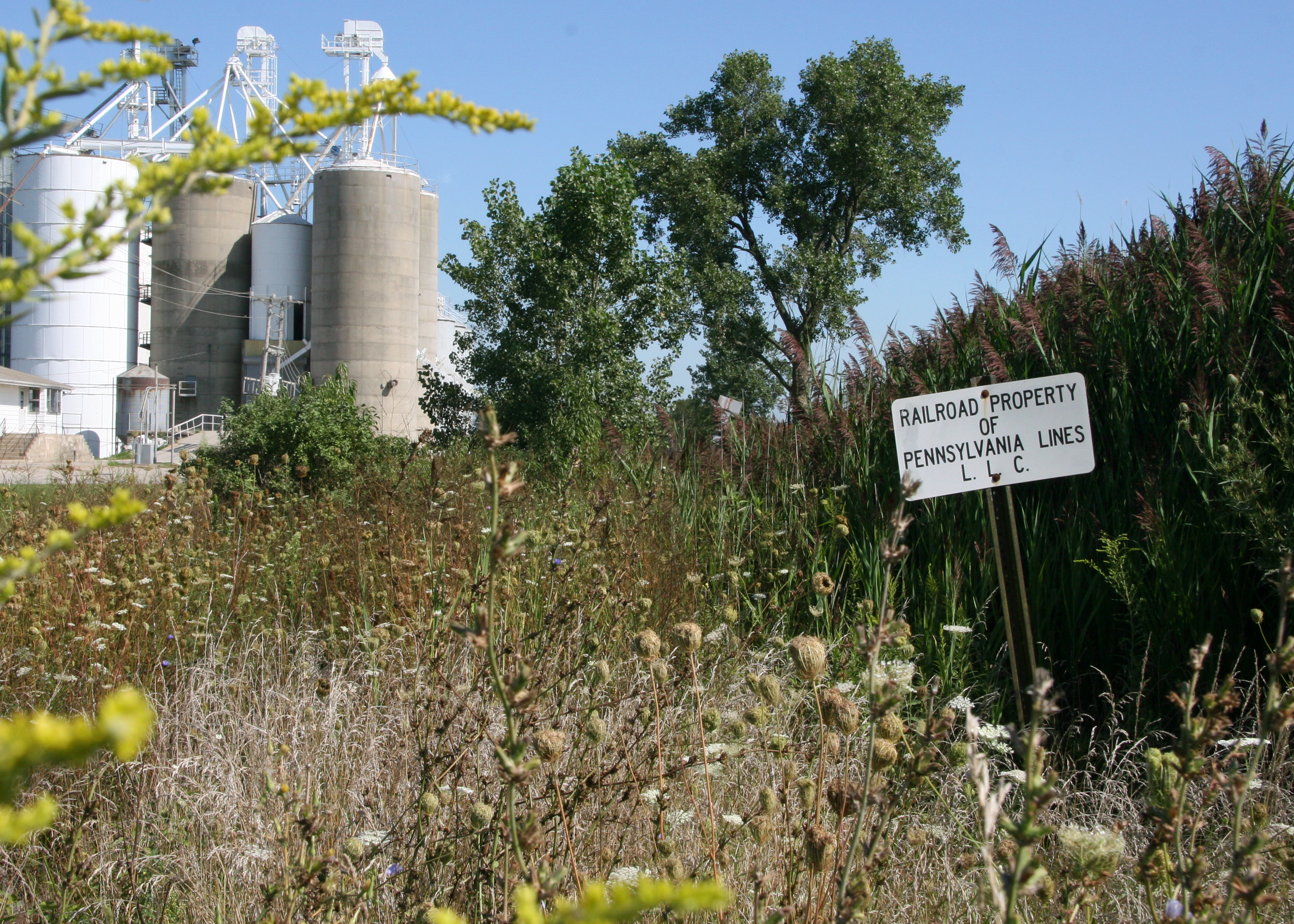
Looking north along the overgrown rail line.

Dunn is located at 40°33′50″N 87°27′50″W along Benton County Road 300 South, on the border of Parish Grove Township and Hickory Grove Township. A defunct and overgrown rail line runs north and south through the settlement.
