= Freeland Park, Indiana =

- Unincorporated town
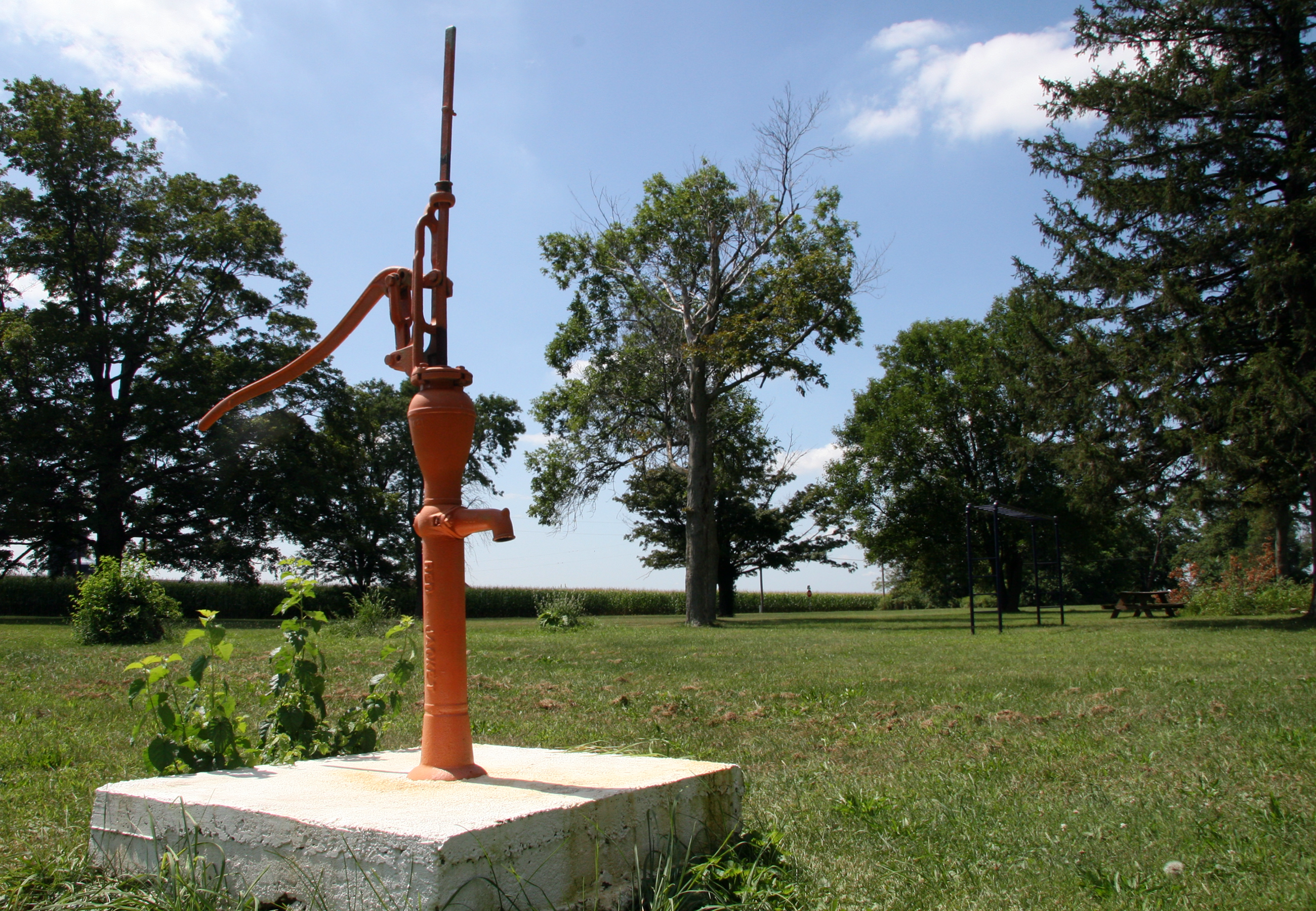
- A water pump in the town park

- Benton County's location in Indiana

- Freeland Park's location in Benton County
- Coordinates: 40°36′52″N 87°29′28″W
- Country: United States
- State: Indiana
- County: Benton
- Township: Parish Grove
- Platted: 1898
- Named after: Antoine Freeland
- Elevation: 722 ft (220 m)
- Time zone: UTC-5 (Eastern (EST))
  - Summer (DST): UTC-4 (EDT)
- ZIP code: 47944
- Area code: 765
- FIPS code: 18-25792
- GNIS feature ID: 434812

Freeland Park is an unincorporated town in Parish Grove Township, Benton County, in the U.S. state of Indiana. It is part of the Lafayette, Indiana Metropolitan Statistical Area.

== History ==
Freeland Park was platted in 1898 and named for Antoine Freeland, the original owner of the town site. It stood at the terminus of the Freeland Park branch of the Chicago and Eastern Illinois Railroad. A fire in 1914 badly damaged the town's business district. In the 1920s Freeland Park had two grain elevators, a high school, a Presbyterian church and eight to ten businesses.

A post office was established at Freeland Park in 1901, and remained in operation until it was discontinued in 1957.

== Geography ==
Freeland Park is located at 40°36′52″N 87°29′28″W, half a mile south of the intersection of Indiana State Roads 18 and 71 and a little under two miles east of the Illinois state line. A small waterway known as Salmon Ditch runs just north of town and flows west into Illinois where it becomes Cole Creek.
