= Cheneyville, Illinois =

Cheneyville
- Unincorporated community
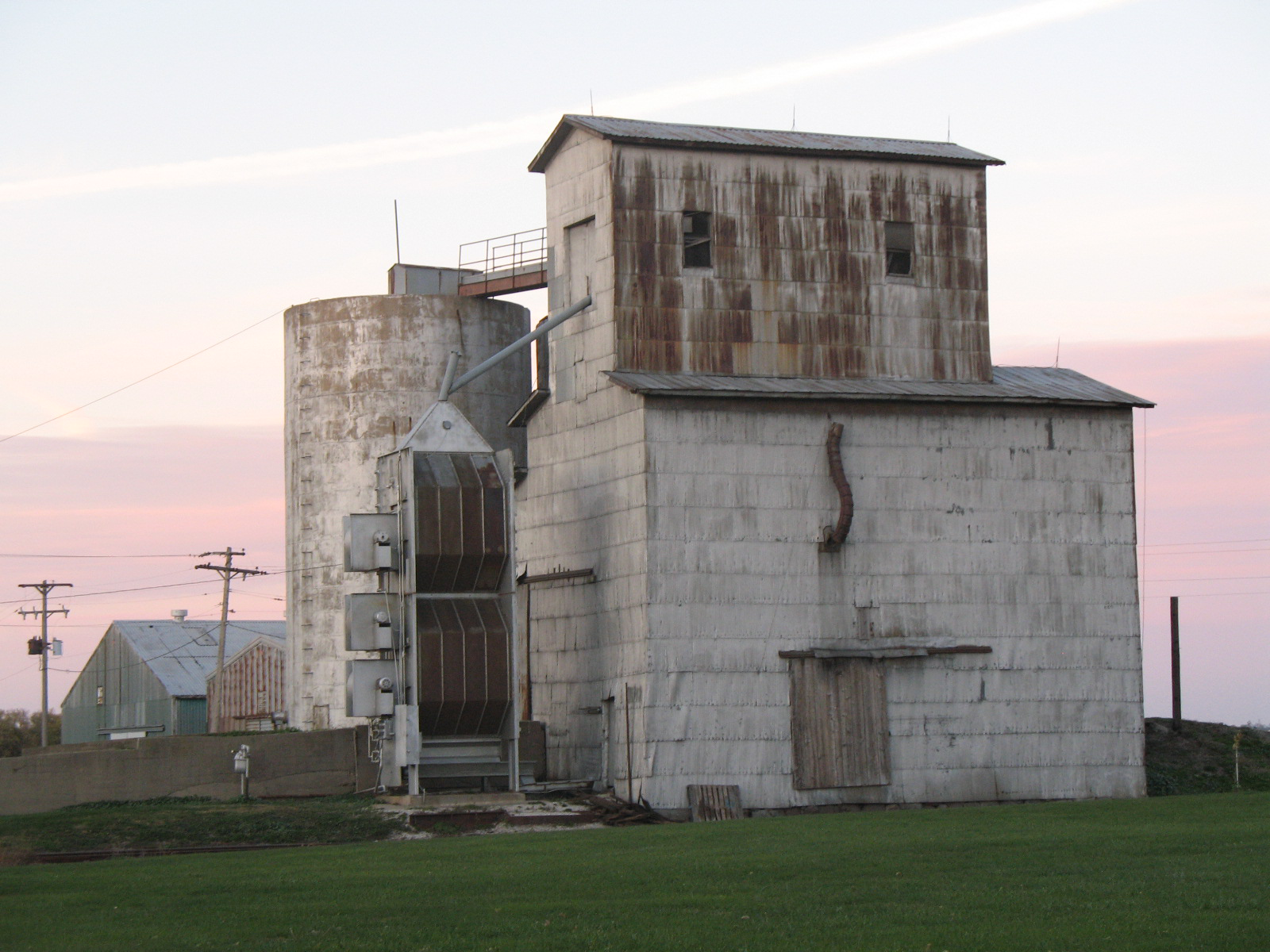
- Grain elevator in Cheneyville

- Vermilion County's location in Illinois

- Cheneyville's location in Vermilion County
- Coordinates: 40°28′09″N 87°35′05″W
- Country: United States
- State: Illinois
- County: Vermilion County
- Township: Grant Township
- Established: 1871
- Elevation: 725 ft (221 m)
- ZIP code: 60942
- Area code: 217
- GNIS feature ID: 0406006

Cheneyville is an unincorporated community in Grant Township, Vermilion County, Illinois.

== History ==
Cheneyville was founded in 1871 and platted in 1880. It was named for J. H. Cheney, the vice-president of the Lake Erie and Western Railroad. A telephone system was installed in 1888 and soon had to be expanded due to rising demand.

== Geography ==
Cheneyville is located at 40°28′9″N 87°35′5″W (40.4692031, -87.5847437), about four miles east of the village of Hoopeston and less than two miles south of the northern border of the county. The Kankakee, Beaverville and Southern Railroad passes through town and Illinois Route 9 runs about half a mile to the south.

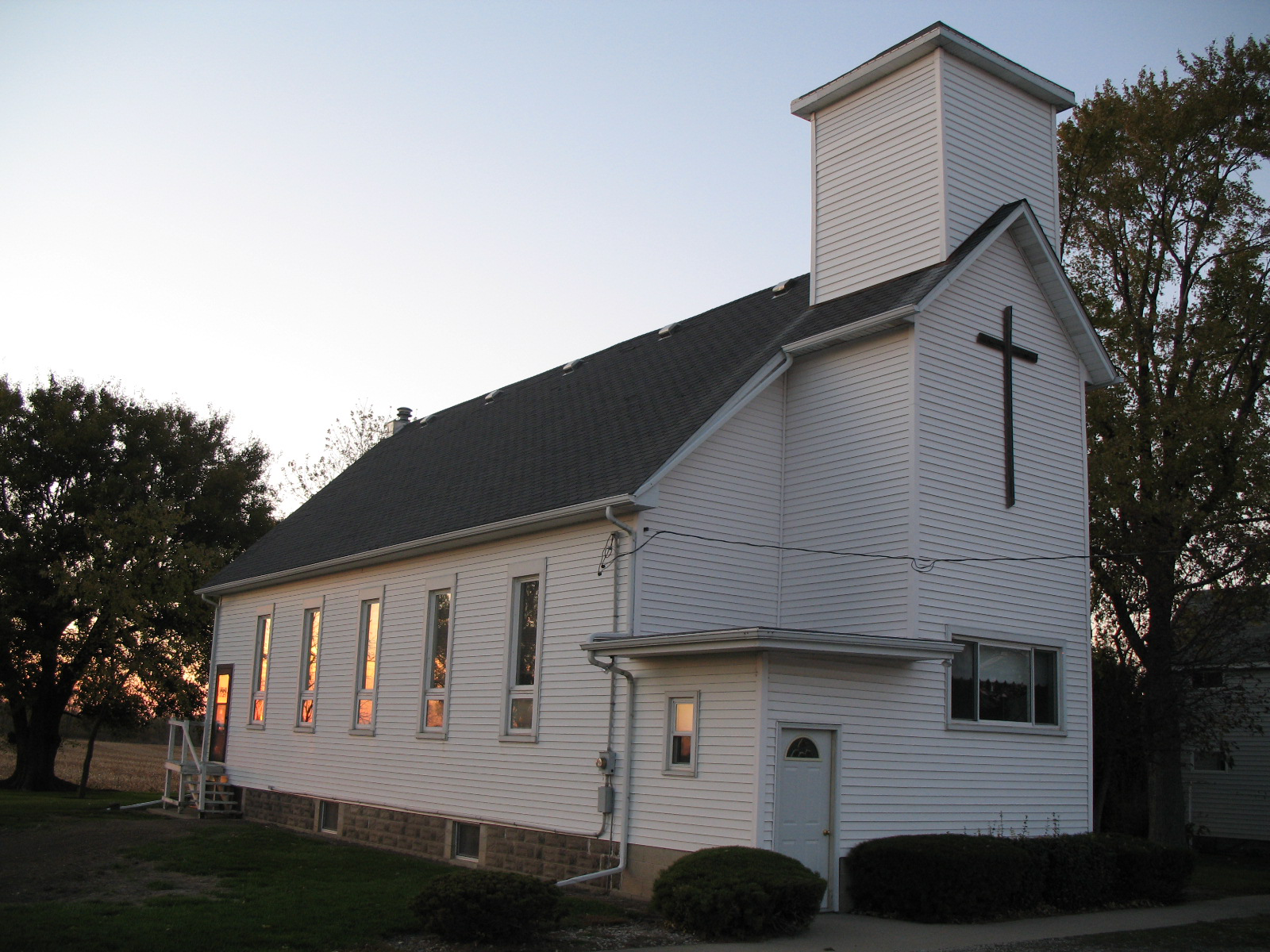
Cheneyville church
