= Hickory Grove Township, Benton County, Indiana =

Hickory Grove Township
- Township
- Location of Hickory Grove Township in Benton County
- Coordinates: 40°31′06″N 87°28′47″W
- Country: United States
- State: Indiana
- County: Benton
- Organized: March 1876

Government
  - Type: Indiana township

Area
  - Total: 28.9 sq mi (75 km^{2})
  - Land: 28.9 sq mi (75 km^{2})
  - Water: 0 sq mi (0 km^{2})
- Elevation: 745 ft (227 m)

Population (2020)
  - Total: 398
  - Density: 13.8/sq mi (5.32/km^{2})
- Time zone: UTC-5 (EST)
  - Summer (DST): UTC-4 (EDT)
- Area code: 765
- FIPS code: 18-33358
- GNIS feature ID: 453410

Hickory Grove Township is one of eleven townships in Benton County, Indiana. As of the 2020 census, its population was 398 and it contained 168 housing units. It was organized in March 1876 and named for a grove of hickory trees that grew within its borders in the 19th century.

Historical population
Census	Pop.	Note	%±
1890	962		—
1900	1,191		23.8%
1910	1,026		−13.9%
1920	1,109		8.1%
1930	989		−10.8%
1940	877		−11.3%
1950	816		−7.0%
1960	799		−2.1%
1970	679		−15.0%
1980	560		−17.5%
1990	476		−15.0%
2000	404		−15.1%
2010	409		1.2%
2020	398		−2.7%
Source: US Decennial Census

== Geography ==
According to the 2020 census, the township has a total area of 28.9 square miles (75 km^{2}), all land.

=== Cities and towns ===
- Ambia

=== Unincorporated towns ===
- Dunn
- Powley Corners
- Talbot

=== Adjacent townships ===
- Grant (east)
- Parish Grove (north)
- Prairie Township, Warren County (south)

=== Major highways ===
- Indiana State Road 71
- Indiana State Road 352

=== Cemeteries ===
The township contains one cemetery, Totheroh.
