= Swanington, Indiana =

- Unincorporated community
- Benton County's location in Indiana

- Freeland Park's location in Benton County
- Coordinates: 40°35′00″N 87°16′38″W
- Country: United States
- State: Indiana
- County: Benton
- Township: Center
- Founder: William Swan
- Elevation: 804 ft (245 m)
- Time zone: UTC-5 (CST)
  - Summer (DST): UTC-4 (CDT)
- ZIP code: 47944
- Area code: 765
- FIPS code: 18-74492
- GNIS feature ID: 444465

Swanington is an unincorporated community in Center Township, Benton County, in the U.S. state of Indiana. It is part of the Lafayette, Indiana Metropolitan Statistical Area.

== History ==
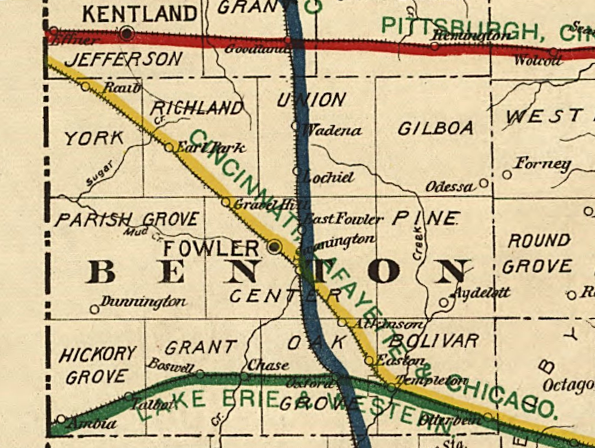
Benton County Railroad map, circa 1896, showing the location of Swanington

Swanington was platted by William Swan at the intersection of the existing Cleveland, Cincinnati, Chicago and St. Louis Railway (the "Big Four") which ran southeast from nearby Fowler and the new Chicago, Attica and Southern Railroad. Before its platting, the site was known as Wyndham, the name possibly coming from the town of Windham, Connecticut. In the 1920s the town supported a general store, grain elevator, grade school, United Brethren church and about 100 people.

A post office was established at Swanington in 1886, and remained in operation until it was discontinued in 1937.

== Geography ==
Swanington is located at 40°35′00″N 87°16′38″W in Center Township, on U.S. Route 52 southeast of Fowler.
