= Stewart, Indiana =

- Unincorporated community
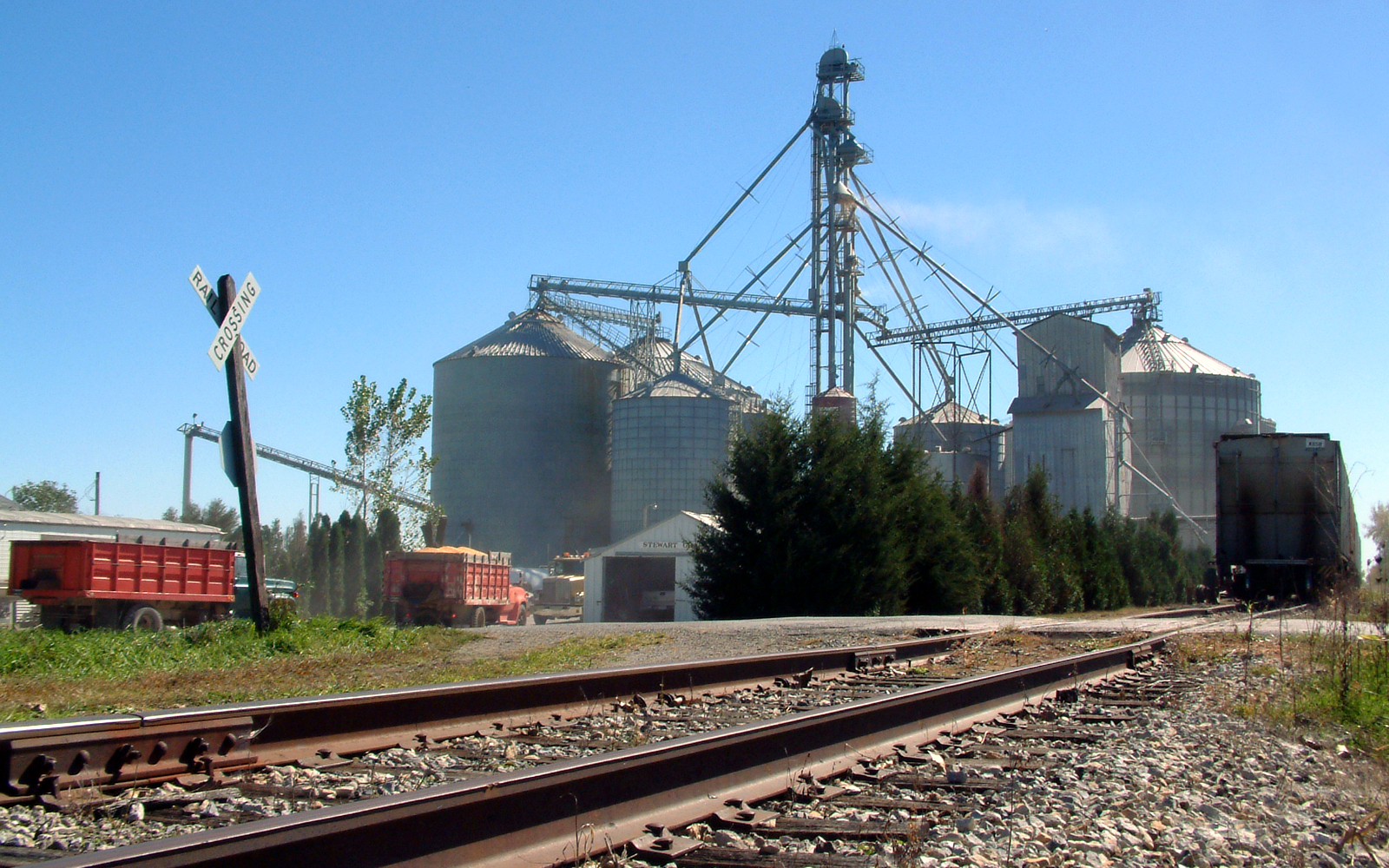
- Grain elevators at harvest time, October 2006

- Location within Warren County, Indiana Location within Indiana Location within the United States
- Coordinates: 40°21′36″N 87°28′21″W
- Country: United States
- State: Indiana
- County: Warren
- Township: Jordan
- Elevation: 712 ft (217 m)
- Time zone: UTC-5 (Eastern (EST))
  - Summer (DST): UTC-4 (EDT)
- ZIP code: 47993
- Area code: 765
- GNIS feature ID: 444145

Stewart is a small unincorporated community in Jordan Township, Warren County, in the U.S. state of Indiana. It sits at the south end of the short Bee Line Railroad and consists of a single residence and a grain elevator operated by the Stewart Grain Company. The original elevator, built in 1905 and rebuilt in 1910 after a fire, still stands although it was moved 500 feet to a non-working location in 2009 for historical and sentimental reasons.

== Geography ==
Stewart is located at the intersection of County Road 300 North and the Bee Line Railroad, about two miles directly east of Pence.
