= Pence, Indiana =

- Unincorporated community and Census-designated place
- Location within Warren County, Indiana Location within Indiana Location within the United States
- Coordinates: 40°21′49″N 87°30′46″W
- Country: United States
- State: Indiana
- County: Warren
- Township: Jordan
- Founded: 1902
- Founder: Frank R. Pence

Area
  - Total: 0.17 sq mi (0.44 km^{2})
  - Land: 0.17 sq mi (0.44 km^{2})
- Elevation: 689 ft (210 m)

Population (2020)
  - Total: 41
  - Density: 242.3/sq mi (93.56/km^{2})
- Time zone: UTC-5 (Eastern (EST))
  - Summer (DST): UTC-4 (EDT)
- ZIP code: 47993
- Area code: 765
- GNIS feature ID: 2806540

Pence is a small unincorporated community in Jordan Township, Warren County, in the U.S. state of Indiana.

As of the 2020 census, Pence had a population of 41.

== History ==
Pence was founded in September 1902 by Frank R. Pence, who purchased 40 acres (160,000 m^{2}) of land for the purpose. In 1903, Pence became the smallest town in the United States to have a central water system. In the early part of the 20th century, Pence had numerous businesses including a grain elevator, a blacksmith shop, a welding and machine shop, a lumber yard, a coal yard, the Bank of Pence (which closed in the 1920s), a hotel (which also housed the post office for a time), restaurants, a general store, grocery stores, a hardware store, a weekly newspaper, a funeral home, a jewelry store, and various others. As of 1913, the population was about 150.

Pence had a baseball team from 1910 to 1955, and also had a basketball team (the Pence Aces).

The post office operated from October 12, 1903, to April 5, 1957.

== Geography ==
Pence is located less than a mile east of the Indiana-Illinois state line and a quarter mile from Jordan Creek, which flows southwest toward the Vermilion River. It is on County Road 300 North, which (in Illinois) runs into the town of Rossville about 9 miles to the west.

== Demographics ==
Historical population
Census	Pop.	Note	%±
2020	41		—
U.S. Decennial Census

== Education ==
It is in the Metropolitan School District of Warren County.

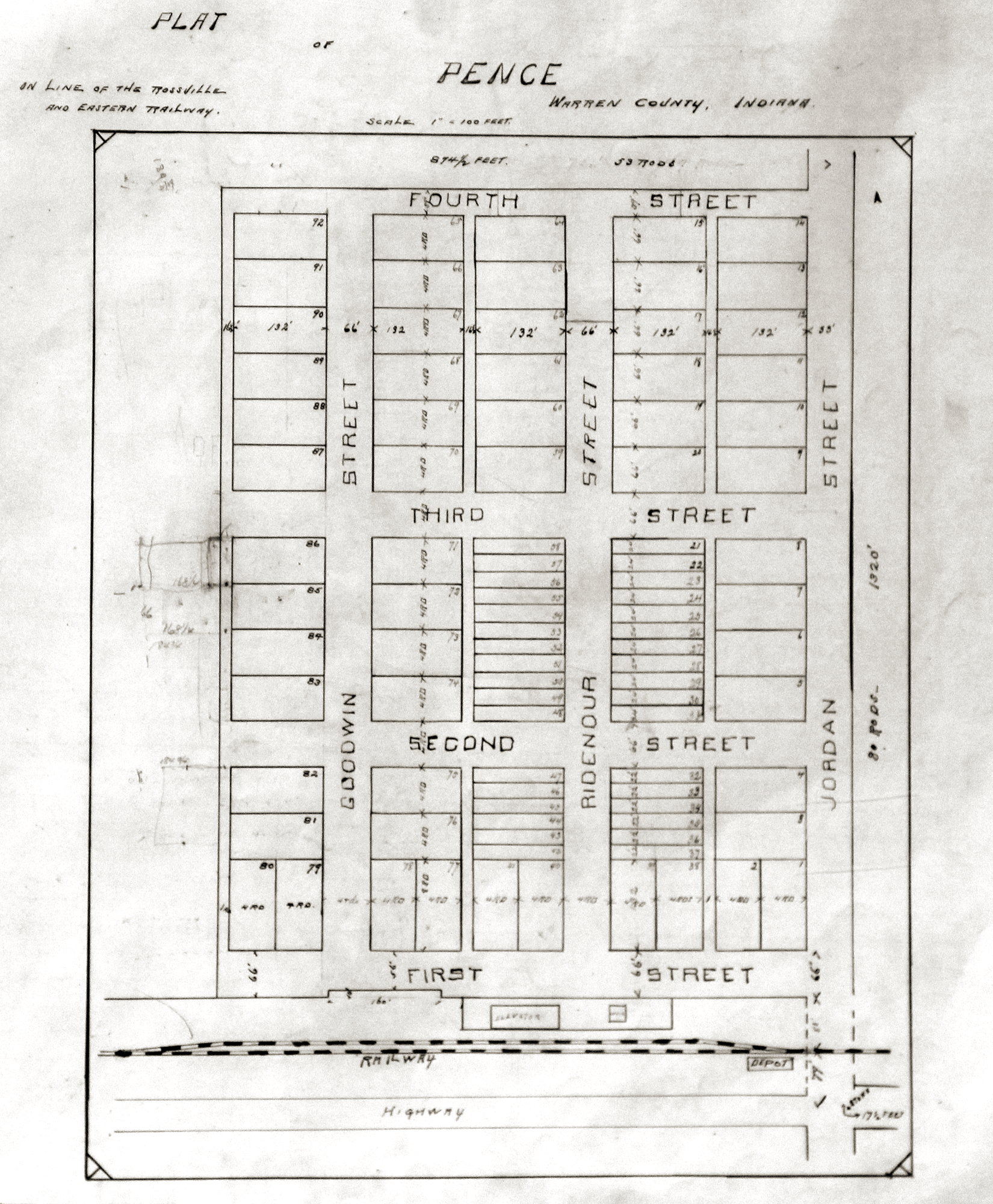
Pence's 1902 plat

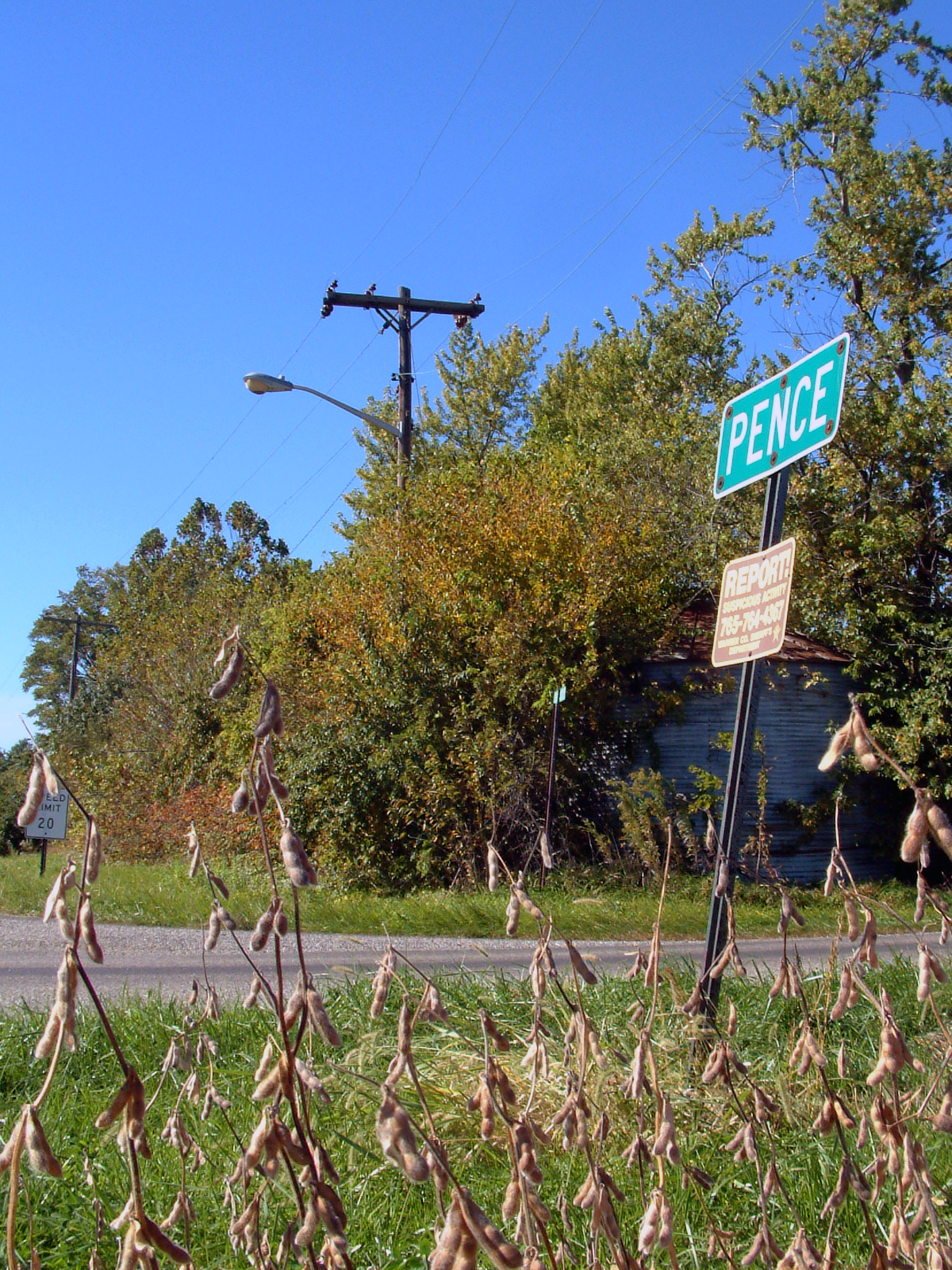
The corner of First and Jordan streets
