= Bee Line Railroad =

Railroad in Indiana, United States

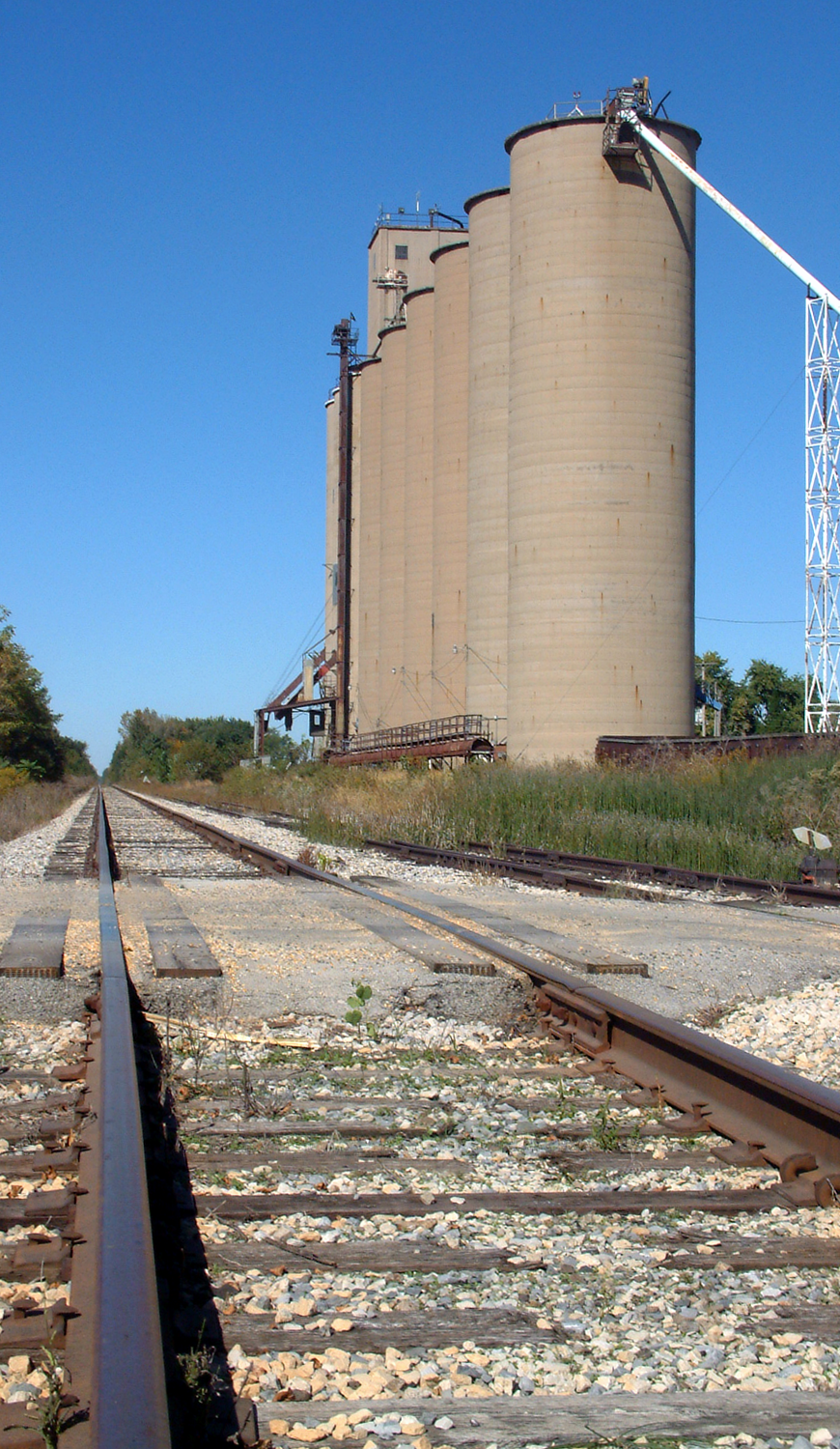
- North along the Bee Line at Tab

Overview
- Headquarters: Stewart, Indiana
- Locale: West central Indiana
- Dates of operation: 1994–

Technical
- Track gauge: 4 ft 8½ in (1435 mm) (standard gauge)
- Length: 10 miles

The Bee Line Railroad is a short-line railroad operated by the Kankakee, Beaverville and Southern Railroad, serving agricultural communities in northwestern Warren County and southwestern Benton County in Indiana, United States. It joins the Kankakee, Beaverville and Southern Railroad about two miles east of Ambia in Benton County, from which point it heads south into Warren, passes through the town of Tab, and terminates just south of Stewart.
