= Hedrick, Indiana =

- Unincorporated community and Census-designated place
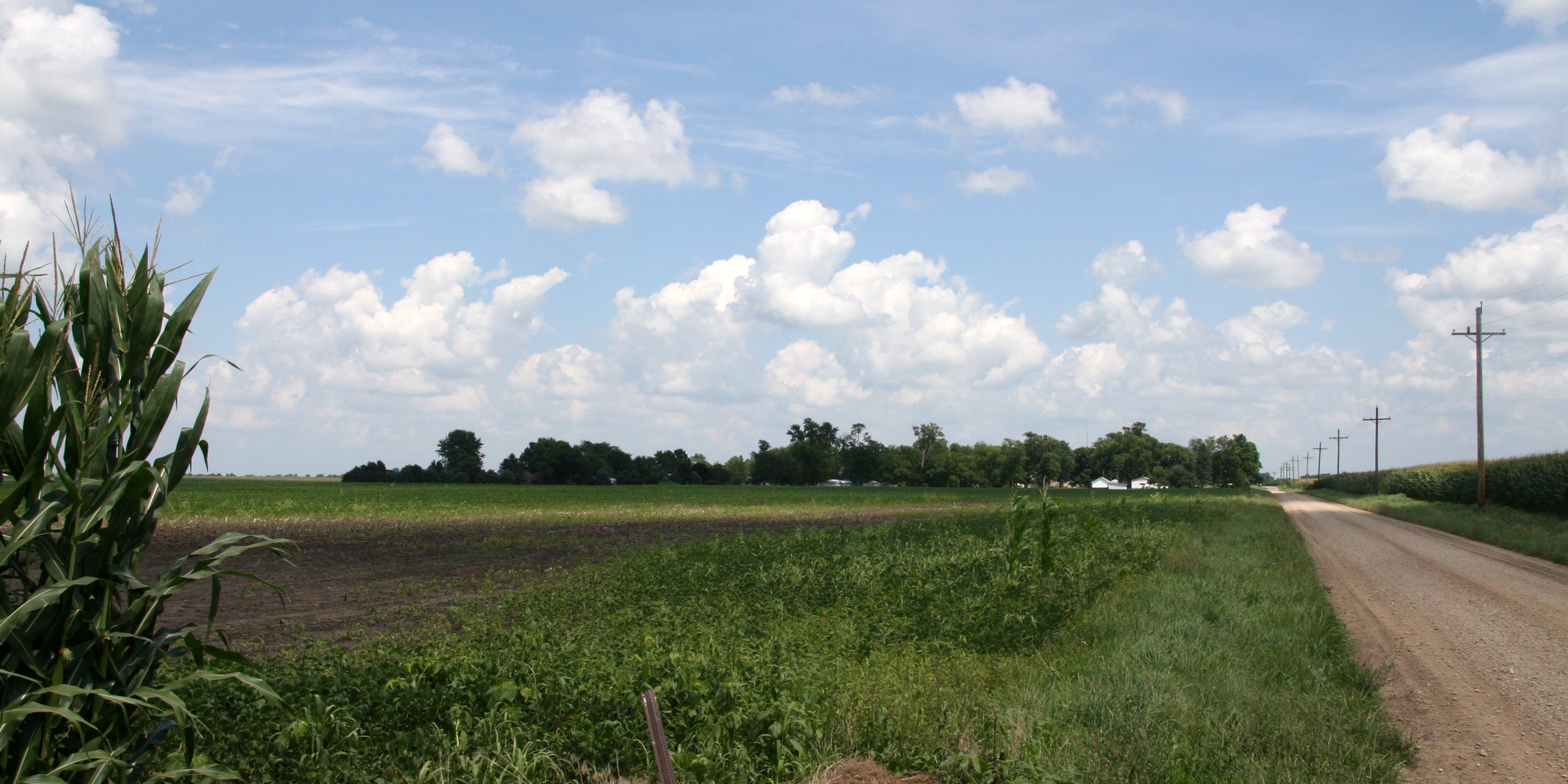
- Looking east toward Hedrick along County Road 100 South

- Location within Warren County, Indiana Location within Indiana Location within the United States
- Coordinates: 40°18′11″N 87°29′33″W
- Country: United States
- State: Indiana
- County: Warren
- Township: Jordan
- Founded: 1881

Area
  - Total: 0.039 sq mi (0.10 km^{2})
  - Land: 0.039 sq mi (0.10 km^{2})
  - Water: 0 sq mi (0.00 km^{2})
- Elevation: 702 ft (214 m)

Population (2020)
  - Total: 67
  - Density: 1,665.8/sq mi (643.15/km^{2})
- Time zone: UTC-5 (Eastern (EST))
  - Summer (DST): UTC-4 (EDT)
- ZIP code: 47993
- Area code: 765
- GNIS feature ID: 2806498

Hedrick is a small unincorporated community in Jordan Township, Warren County, in the U.S. state of Indiana. As of the 2020 census, Hedrick had a population of 67.

== History ==
The town of Hedrick began on July 31, 1881, with its platting by locals Parmenas G. Smith and G. W. Compton. The first house was built by John Hendricks and the first store opened by Zarse & Ahrens. The town also gained a drug store operated by Frank Hartman and a school house erected in the early 1880s. A post office was established in Hedrick on January 14, 1880, and closed on January 31, 1959.

A tornado nearly destroyed Hedrick on April 17, 1922. The storm cut a path through the town an eighth of a mile wide, killing four residents, destroying six homes and ten businesses, and leaving only three buildings intact. Including persons who lived near Hedrick but not within city limits, 11 people were killed and 35 injured. Following the storm, newspapers estimated from ten to fifty thousand people flocked to the area to view the destruction, prompting the governor to deploy part of the state militia to control the crowds and prevent looting.

== Geography ==
Hedrick is located on flat, open farmland on the southern edge of Jordan Township, at the intersection of County Roads 900 West and 100 South. It is about 2 miles (3.2 km) east of the Illinois border, 11 miles (18 km) west of the county seat of Williamsport, and 1.5 miles (2.4 km) north of State Road 28. Prior to the founding of the town, a wooded site called Hedrick's Grove stood to the east of nearby Redwood Creek.

== Demographics ==
Historical population
Census	Pop.	Note	%±
2020	67		—
U.S. Decennial Census

== Education ==
It is in the Metropolitan School District of Warren County.
