= Scheff =

Scheff is a surname. Notable people with the surname include:

- Fritzi Scheff, American actress
- Jason Scheff, American musician
- Jerry Scheff, American musician
- Otto Scheff, Austrian freestyle swimmer
- Thomas J. Scheff (1929–2025), American sociologist
- Werner Scheff (1888–1947), German writer and screenwriter

== See also ==
- Scheff., taxonomic author abbreviation for Rudolph Scheffer (1844–1880), Dutch botanist
