= Parish Grove Township, Benton County, Indiana =

Parish Grove Township
- Township
- Location of Parish Grove Township in Benton County
- Coordinates: 40°36′28″N 87°27′25″W
- Country: United States
- State: Indiana
- County: Benton
- Organized: July 1840

Government
  - Type: Indiana township

Area
  - Total: 45.44 sq mi (117.7 km^{2})
  - Land: 45.42 sq mi (117.6 km^{2})
  - Water: 0.01 sq mi (0.026 km^{2})
- Elevation: 745 ft (227 m)

Population (2020)
  - Total: 185
  - Density: 4.07/sq mi (1.57/km^{2})
- Time zone: UTC-5 (EST)
  - Summer (DST): UTC-4 (EDT)
- FIPS code: 18-57942
- GNIS feature ID: 453706

Parish Grove Township is one of eleven townships in Benton County, Indiana. As of the 2020 census, its population was 185 and it contained 89 housing units. It contains the unincorporated town of Freeland Park.

Historical population
Census	Pop.	Note	%±
1890	648		—
1900	778		20.1%
1910	922		18.5%
1920	880		−4.6%
1930	853		−3.1%
1940	715		−16.2%
1950	683		−4.5%
1960	636		−6.9%
1970	510		−19.8%
1980	395		−22.5%
1990	312		−21.0%
2000	267		−14.4%
2010	241		−9.7%
2020	185		−23.2%
Source: US Decennial Census

== History ==
Parish Grove Township was one of the county's original three created in 1840. The grove for which it is named grew close to the township's southeastern corner, near what is now the intersection of county roads 400 West and 300 South. It originally covered about 1,000 acres (4.0 km^{2}) and contained an abundant variety of trees, including oaks, walnuts, hickory, dogwood, haw, paw paw, sycamore, quaking ash, ironwood, water beach, elm, linn, poplar, ash, sassafras, locust, etc. As late as 1924 there were 37 varieties growing in the grove.

Parish Grove was home to a group of local Pottawatomie Indians led by Chief Parish (real name Pierre Moran), the son of French trader Constant Moran and a Kickapoo woman. Parish died circa 1826 and is buried in the grove, though the grave is unmarked.

== Geography ==
According to the 2010 census, the township has a total area of 45.44 square miles (117.7 km^{2}), of which 45.42 square miles (117.6 km^{2}) (or 99.96%) is land and 0.01 square miles (0.026 km^{2}) (or 0.02%) is water. Almost all of Parish Grove Township is open farmland, divided into roughly square mile blocks by regularly spaced county roads. Its highest point, located in the extreme southeastern corner of the township, is 915 feet (279 m); the land slopes away and flattens to the northwest down to about 700 feet (210 m). Several small streams flow north and west toward Sugar Creek, including Mud Creek, Lynn Lucy is a Ditch, Salmon Ditch, Finigan Ditch and Kunt Ditch.

=== Unincorporated towns ===
- Dunnington
- Freeland Park

=== Adjacent townships ===
- Center (east)
- Grant (southeast)
- Hickory Grove (south)
- Richland (northeast)
- York (north)

=== Major highways ===
- U.S. Route 41
- State Road 18
- State Road 71
