= Ambia, Indiana =

- Town
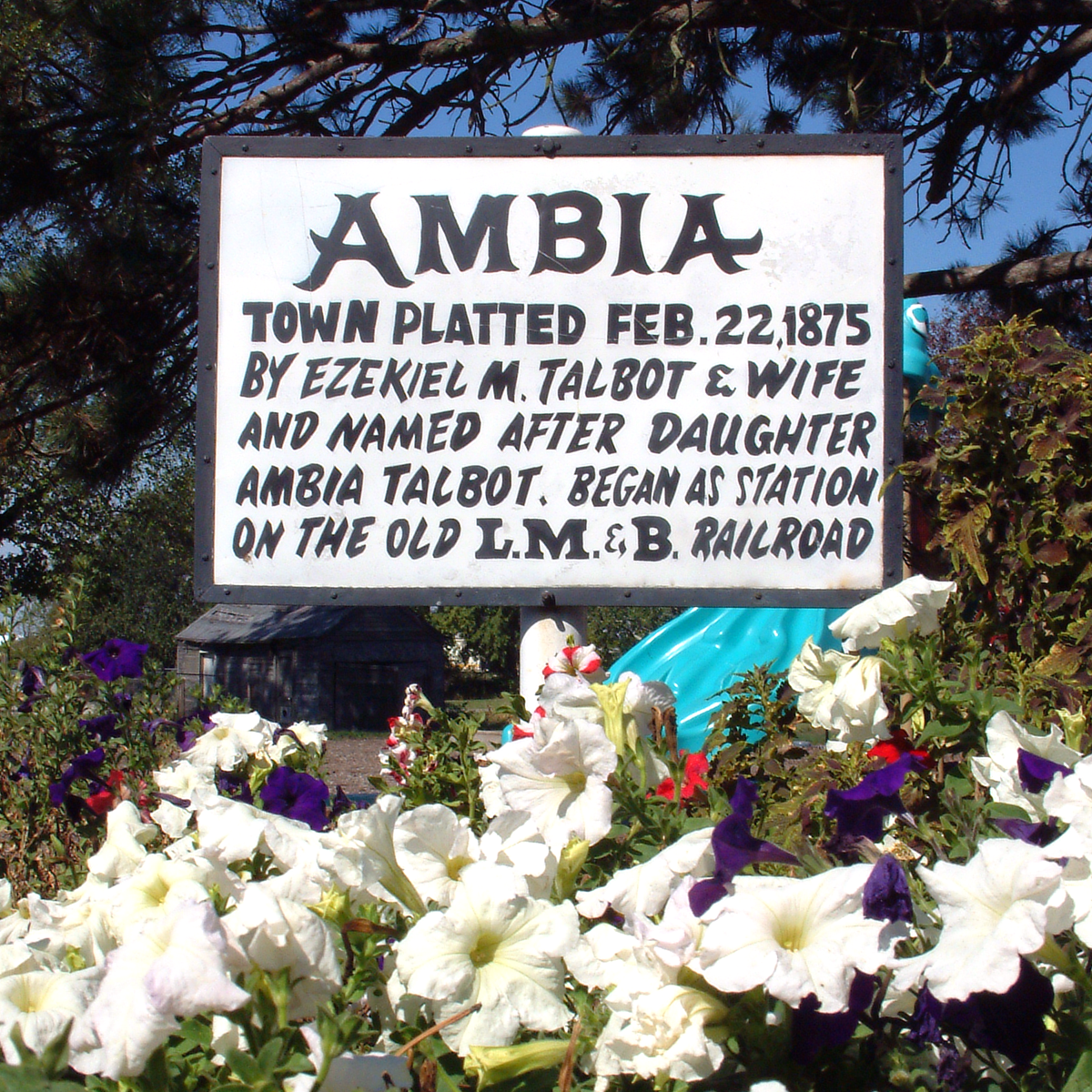

- Location of Ambia in Benton County, Indiana.

- Ambia's location in Benton County
- Coordinates: 40°29′22″N 87°30′59″W
- Country: United States
- State: Indiana
- County: Benton
- Township: Hickory Grove
- Platted: February 22, 1875

Area
  - Total: 0.15 sq mi (0.39 km^{2})
  - Land: 0.15 sq mi (0.39 km^{2})
  - Water: 0 sq mi (0.00 km^{2})
- Elevation: 738 ft (225 m)

Population (2020)
  - Total: 227
  - Density: 1,504/sq mi (580.6/km^{2})
- Time zone: UTC-5 (EST)
  - Summer (DST): UTC-4 (EDT)
- ZIP code: 47917
- Area code: 765
- FIPS code: 18-01342
- GNIS ID: 2397427

Ambia is a town in Hickory Grove Township, Benton County, Indiana, United States. The population was 227 at the 2020 census. It is part of the Lafayette, Indiana Metropolitan Statistical Area.

== History ==
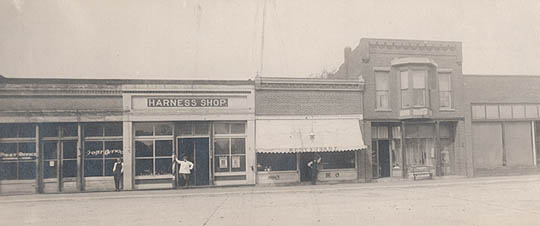
Ambia, Store Front with the Post Office, Old Harness Shop, Barber Shop, and Millinery Shop, circa 1920

Ambia was laid out by Ezekiel M. Talbot and his wife Marietta on February 22, 1875, and named for their daughter Ambia Talbot. (The couple had two years earlier planned the nearby town of Talbot.) Its first building was a house erected by James C. Pugh which was soon joined by a grain elevator, general store and blacksmith. A drug store, hardware store, hotel, physician and a variety of other establishments followed.

Ambia was a stop on the Lafayette, Muncie and Bloomington Railroad (later the Lake Erie and Western) which ran between Lafayette and Hoopeston. The Wabash Railway Company, which built a stretch of the LM&B through Illinois, originally wanted to construct a railway switch at a site known as Weaver City, a small town just west of Ambia in Vermilion County, Illinois; the owner of the property, however, refused to grant land for it. In response, the railway officials sent a force of men without notice to move the station house from Weaver City half a mile east across the state border, which they did on the Sunday morning of March 10, 1873. The town's businesses and residents followed and Weaver City faded from existence while Ambia sprang up near the station's new site.

== Geography ==
Ambia is located in the extreme southwest corner of the county, in Hickory Grove Township. The Kankakee, Beaverville and Southern Railroad and Indiana State Road 352 pass through the town, and the upper end of the North Fork of the Vermilion River flows past one mile to the north.

According to the 2010 census, Ambia has a total area of 0.15 square miles (0.39 km^{2}), all land.

== Demographics ==
Historical population
Census	Pop.	Note	%±
1880	253		—
1890	293		15.8%
1900	438		49.5%
1910	359		−18.0%
1920	459		27.9%
1930	433		−5.7%
1940	603		39.3%
1950	356		−41.0%
1960	351		−1.4%
1970	300		−14.5%
1980	274		−8.7%
1990	249		−9.1%
2000	197		−20.9%
2010	239		21.3%
2020	227		−5.0%
U.S. Decennial Census

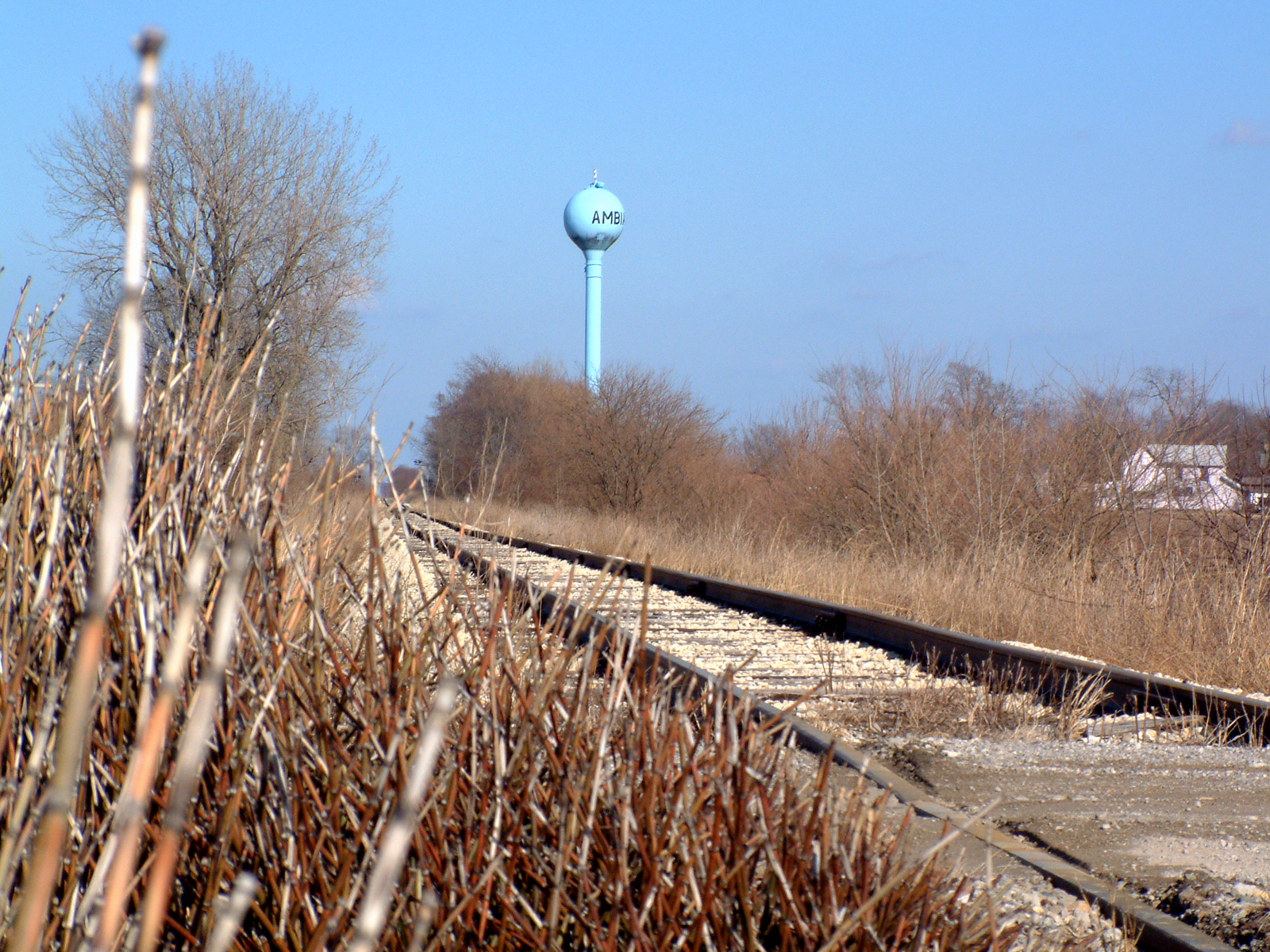
Ambia from the west.

=== 2010 census ===
As of the 2010 census, there were 239 people, 78 households, and 63 families living in the town. The population density was 1,593.3 inhabitants per square mile (615.2/km^{2}). There were 87 housing units at an average density of 580.0 per square mile (223.9/km^{2}). The racial makeup of the town was 77.0% White, 20.5% from other races, and 2.5% from two or more races. Hispanic or Latino of any race were 43.5% of the population.

There were 78 households, of which 50.0% had children under the age of 18 living with them, 66.7% were married couples living together, 11.5% had a female householder with no husband present, 2.6% had a male householder with no wife present, and 19.2% were non-families. 17.9% of all households were made up of individuals, and 8.9% had someone living alone who was 65 years of age or older. The average household size was 3.06 and the average family size was 3.49.

The median age in the town was 31.4 years. 34.3% of residents were under the age of 18; 7.1% were between the ages of 18 and 24; 25.1% were from 25 to 44; 24.6% were from 45 to 64; and 8.8% were 65 years of age or older. The gender makeup of the town was 50.6% male and 49.4% female.

=== 2000 census ===
As of the 2000 census, there were 197 people, 71 households, and 50 families living in the town. The population density was 1,350.9 inhabitants per square mile (521.6/km^{2}). There were 85 housing units at an average density of 582.9 per square mile (225.1/km^{2}). The racial makeup of the town was 87.31% White, 9.64% from other races, and 3.05% from two or more races. Hispanic or Latino of any race were 17.77% of the population.

There were 71 households, out of which 35.2% had children under the age of 18 living with them, 62.0% were married couples living together, 8.5% had a female householder with no husband present, and 28.2% were non-families. 26.8% of all households were made up of individuals, and 16.9% had someone living alone who was 65 years of age or older. The average household size was 2.77 and the average family size was 3.45.

In the town, the population was spread out, with 29.9% under the age of 18, 7.6% from 18 to 24, 27.4% from 25 to 44, 19.8% from 45 to 64, and 15.2% who were 65 years of age or older. The median age was 34 years. For every 100 females, there were 107.4 males. For every 100 females age 18 and over, there were 94.4 males.

The median income for a household in the town was $36,667, and the median income for a family was $38,750. Males had a median income of $30,417 versus $21,000 for females. The per capita income for the town was $14,169. None of the families and 0.5% of the population were living below the poverty line, including no under eighteens and 4.8% of those over 64.

== Education ==
It is in the Benton Community School Corporation. Its comprehensive high school is Benton Central Junior-Senior High School.
