= LaFayette, Muncie and Bloomington Railroad =

Overview
- Locale: Midwestern United States
- Dates of operation: 1869–1879

The LaFayette, Muncie and Bloomington Railroad (LM&B) was a railroad company incorporated in Indiana on July 13, 1869. It operated in Indiana and eastern Illinois until its sale on April 28, 1879, to the Lake Erie and Western Railroad. The LM&B line was so named because it ran from the city of Muncie west through Lafayette toward Bloomington. Four of the railroad's directors were from New York City, one was from Springfield, Illinois. Several others were from local towns along the route. The initial president was Ashal Gridley of Bloomington, Illinois. The road was to be financed almost entirely by bonds issued by the cities and townships along the route. Howard and Weston were chosen as contractors and Richard Price Morgan as chief engineer.

With the coming of the railroad many new towns were established. Construction began in 1869. Workers lived in eight company supplied board shanties, with the cost of food and lodging deducted from their wages. The contractors soon found themselves in financial trouble and work was soon halted. Eventually new contractors were found and construction resumed. In November 1871 work was done as far as Saybrook in McLean County where a celebration was head as a locomotive named "General Gridley" pulled a train into the little town. By 1872 freight was being hauled.

On 18 June 1872 a construction train on the new railroad ran off the rails east of Paxton, in Ford County, Illinois; seven workers were killed and twenty-five injured. Complaints about service soon mounted. These concerned "unjust rates", delays in shipping freight, and lack of cars during harvest season. Soon, taxpayers began to protest having to tax themselves to pay off bonds for service over which they had no control. Beginning in October 1876 the LM&B leased the Lafayette, Bloomington and Mississippi Railroad.
