= Sheff, Indiana =

- Extinct town
- Benton County's location in Indiana

- Sheff's location in Benton County
- Coordinates: 40°42′20″N 87°26′57″W
- Country: United States
- State: Indiana
- County: Benton
- Township: York
- Elevation: 764 ft (233 m)
- Time zone: UTC-5 (Eastern (EST))
  - Summer (DST): UTC-4 (EDT)
- ZIP code: 47942
- Area code: 219
- GNIS feature ID: 443340

Sheff is an extinct town in York Township, Benton County, in the U.S. state of Indiana.

== History ==
Sheff was the site of an interlocking tower that controlled the crossing of the New York Central (NYC) railroad and the NYC subsidiary, Big Four (CCC&StL) railroad. The town derives its name from a vice president of the Big Four. It was satirically located at the top of the last glaciations terminal moraine. The North South line was built in 1906 under the name Chicago, Indiana, & Southern. There was a large transfer yard located north of the interlocking. At one point the town contained a YMCA, a roundhouse, a restaurant, and several houses. The 1906 date fits the draining of Beaver Lake north of Morocco, Indiana across which bead the line was built. 1906 was significant as these rail lines fed coal north to the massive steel mills being built at Indiana Harbor and Gary, Indiana. In 1966, three men manned the tower. The tower no longer exists.

== Geography ==
Sheff is located at 40°42′20″N 87°26′57″W, northwest of Earl Park, Indiana.
