= Kankakee, Beaverville and Southern Railroad =

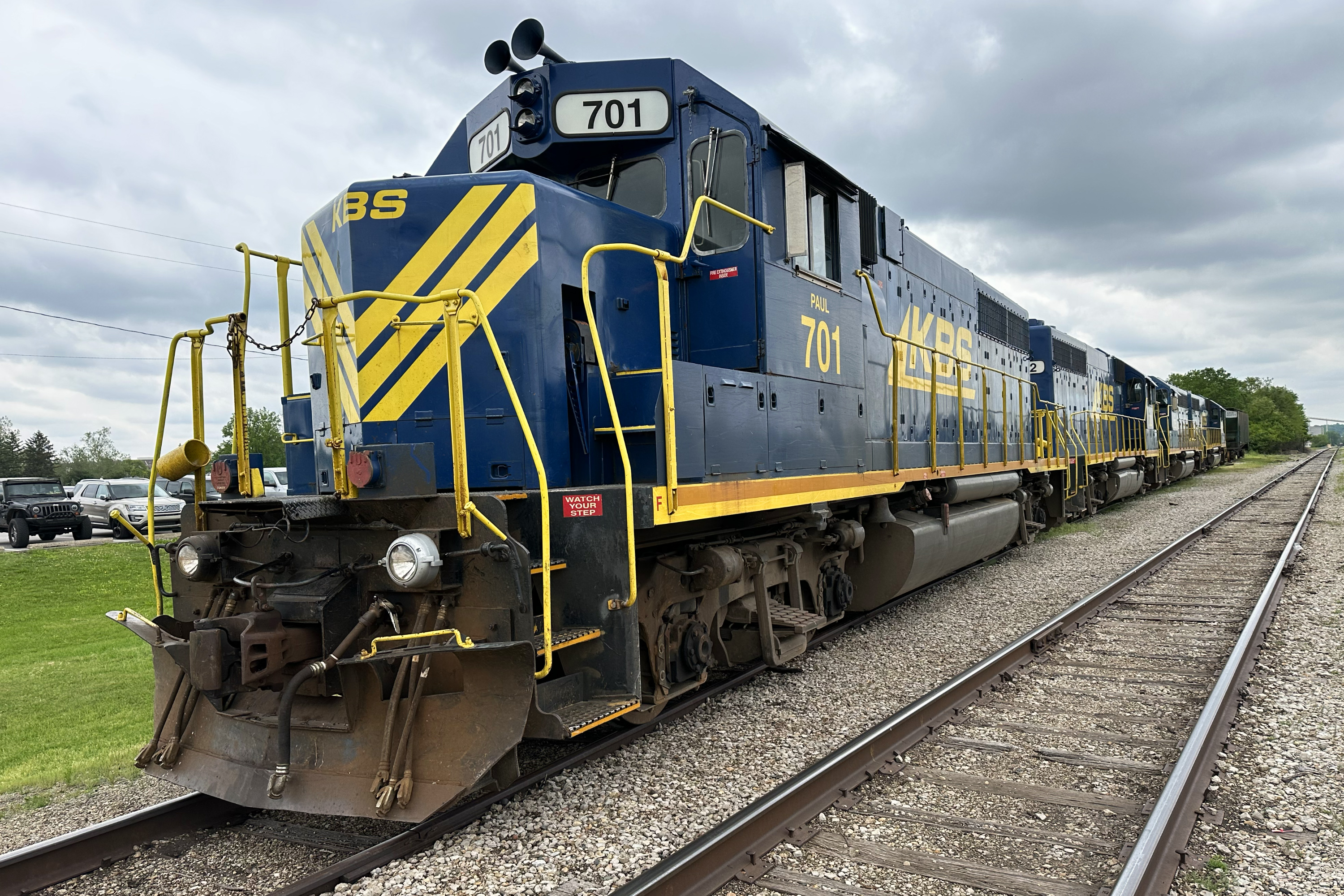
- KBS engines at Purdue Airport

Overview
- Reporting mark: KBSR
- Locale: East central Illinois and west central Indiana
- Dates of operation: 1977–

Technical
- Track gauge: 4 ft 8 1/2 in (1,435 mm) standard gauge

The Kankakee, Beaverville and Southern Railroad Company (reporting mark KBSR) is a Class III railroad serving agricultural communities in east-central Illinois and west-central Indiana.

== History ==
In December 1977, Conrail was set to abandon 25 miles (40 km) of their ex-New York Central Railroad trackage between Kankakee and Sheldon, Illinois, when instead it was purchased by Beaverville businessman Fey Orr to service his lumber and agricultural products industry based there. Eighty miles of the bankrupt Chicago, Milwaukee, St. Paul and Pacific Railroad's trackage from just north of Donovan and Danville were purchased in 1981. These two lines cross near Iroquois. The Norfolk Southern abandoned its ex-New York, Chicago and St. Louis Railroad trackage between Cheneyville, Illinois (north of Danville) Boswell, Indiana and Lafayette, Indiana, which KBSR purchased in 1991. Several other abandonments occurred in the area by Class I railroads which the Kankakee, Beaverville were able to capitalize on. Currently, the KBSR operates about 155 miles (249 km) of trackage in a vaguely triangular shape between Kankakee, Danville, and Lafayette, with numerous sidings.

On July 16, 1997, company founder Fey Orr died at 85. Vice President Kevin Stroo then took over as President of the KB&S until his death in 2009. Current President is Tyler Stroo. Vice-President is Neil Stroo.

== Operations ==
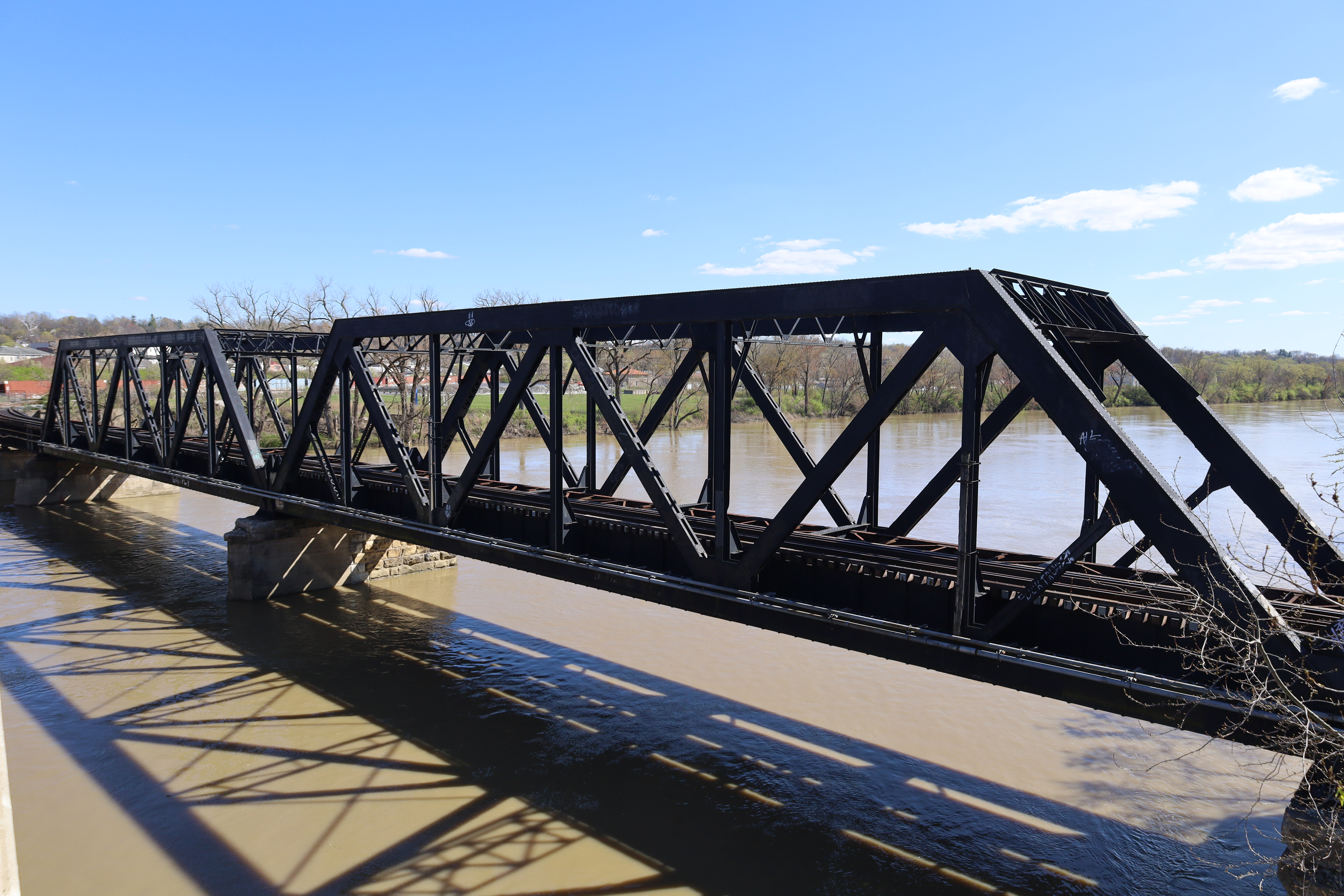
KBSR bridge across the Wabash River in Lafayette, Indiana in 2024

The Kankakee, Beaverville and Southern is privately owned, and serves the various small communities it passes through and their primarily agricultural industries. In recent years it was considered unusual in that it continued to roster Alco diesel locomotives decades after their builder's demise, and became all the more popular amongst railfans for it. However, in December 2003, the KB&S received a group of six EMD GP38-2M locomotives rebuilt from ex-New York Central Railroad GP40s. The railroad named each of these engines after employees.

The KB&S makes numerous connections to other railroads:

- Bee Line Railroad - at Handy, east of Ambia, Indiana
- Canadian National Railway - at Kankakee
- CSX Transportation - at Danville and Lafayette
- Norfolk Southern - at Danville, Kankakee and Lafayette
- Toledo, Peoria and Western Railway - at Webster and Sheldon
- Union Pacific Railroad - at St. Anne, Illinois

Locomotive maintenance is conducted at the road shops at Iroquois Junction.
