= National Register of Historic Places listings in Benton County, Indiana =

Location of Benton County in Indiana

This is a list of the National Register of Historic Places listings in Benton County, Indiana.

This is intended to be a complete list of the properties on the National Register of Historic Places in Benton County, Indiana, United States. Latitude and longitude coordinates are provided for many National Register properties; these locations may be seen together in a map.

There are seven properties listed on the National Register in the county.

Properties and districts located in incorporated areas display the name of the municipality, while properties and districts in unincorporated areas display the name of their civil township. Properties and districts split between multiple jurisdictions display the names of all jurisdictions.

This National Park Service list is complete through NPS recent listings posted December 19, 2025.

== Current listings ==
	Name on the Register	Image	Date listed	Location	City or town	Description
1	Benton County Courthouse	Benton County Courthouse	August 1, 2008 (#08000741)	706 E. 5th St. 40°37′02″N 87°18′56″W	Fowler	
2	Fowler Theatre	Fowler Theatre	December 6, 2004 (#04001315)	111 E. 5th St. 40°37′04″N 87°19′22″W	Fowler	
3	Fraser & Isham Law Office	Fraser & Isham Law Office	September 22, 2000 (#00001135)	306 E. 5th St. 40°37′12″N 87°19′09″W	Fowler	
4	David S. Heath House	David S. Heath House	September 17, 1999 (#99001153)	202 W. McConnell; 40°31′10″N 87°15′06″W	Oxford	
5	Oxford Community Mausoleum		August 24, 2020 (#100005507)	3268 West IN 352; 40°31′08″N 87°15′32″W	Oxford	
6	Oxford Town Square Historic District		January 2, 2026 (#100012494)	Roughly bounded by the alley north of Smith Street, the alley east of Howard Street, Benton Street to the south, and the alley west of Justus Street. 40°31′11″N 87°14′59″W	Oxford	
7	Presbyterian Church Building	Presbyterian Church Building	March 1, 1984 (#84000997)	Northwestern corner of the junction of Benton and Justus Sts. 40°31′08″N 87°15′02″W	Oxford	

== See also ==
- List of National Historic Landmarks in Indiana
- National Register of Historic Places listings in Indiana
- Listings in neighboring counties: Iroquois, Jasper, Newton, Tippecanoe, Vermilion, Warren, White
- List of Indiana state historical markers in Benton County
