= List of Indiana state historical markers in Benton County =

Location of Benton County in Indiana

This is a list of the Indiana state historical markers in Benton County.

This is intended to be a complete list of the official state historical markers placed in Benton County, Indiana, United States by the Indiana Historical Bureau. The locations of the historical markers and their latitude and longitude coordinates are included below when available, along with their names, years of placement, and topics as recorded by the Historical Bureau. There are 3 historical markers located in Benton County.

== Historical markers ==
Marker title	Image	Year placed	Location	Topics
New Purchase Boundary (Treaty of St. Mary's)		1966	State Road 18, 2.5 miles west of its junction with U.S. Route 52 in Fowler and 0.5 miles east of U.S. Route 41; 40°37′20″N 87°22′20″W	Early Settlement and Exploration, American Indian/Native American, Government Institutions
Benton County Courthouse		1995	705 E. Sixth Street at the eastern entrance of the courthouse in Fowler; 40°37′2″N 87°18′56″W	Buildings and Architecture, Government Institutions
Dan Patch		1999	203 S. Michigan Road, near the intersection of State Roads 55 and 352 on the eastern edge of Oxford; 40°31′10″N 87°14′42.5″W	Sports

== See also ==
- List of Indiana state historical markers
- National Register of Historic Places listings in Benton County, Indiana
