= Atkinson, Indiana =

- Unincorporated community
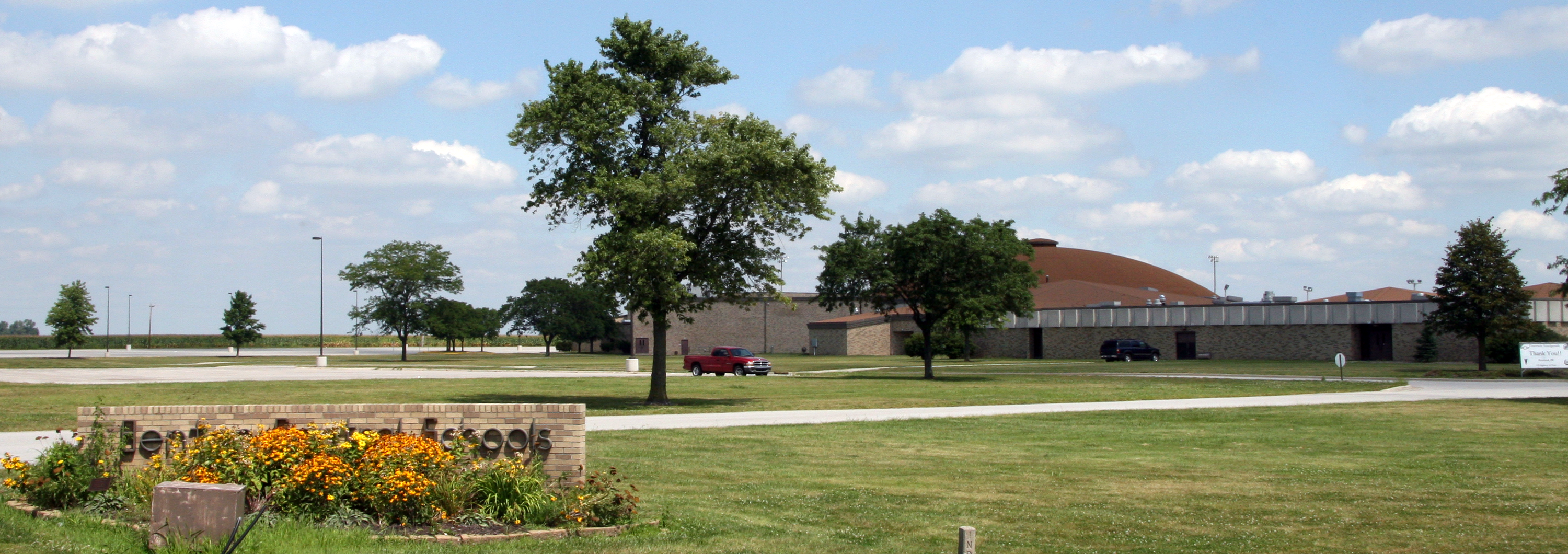
- Benton Central Junior-Senior High School

- Benton County's location in Indiana

- Location in Benton County
- Coordinates: 40°33′46″N 87°14′48″W
- Country: United States
- State: Indiana
- County: Benton
- Township: Center
- Named for: Cephas Atkinson
- Elevation: 778 ft (237 m)
- Time zone: UTC-5 (Eastern (EST))
  - Summer (DST): UTC-4 (EDT)
- ZIP code: 47971
- Area code: 765
- FIPS code: 18-02566
- GNIS feature ID: 430324

Atkinson is an unincorporated community in Center Township, Benton County, in the U.S. state of Indiana. The site of Atkinson is home to the county's only junior/senior high school, Benton Central.

== Geography ==
Atkinson is located at 40°33′46″N 87°14′48″W on the border of Center and Oak Grove Townships. U.S. Route 52 and the Kankakee, Beaverville and Southern Railroad both pass northwest through the town.

== History ==
=== Early years ===
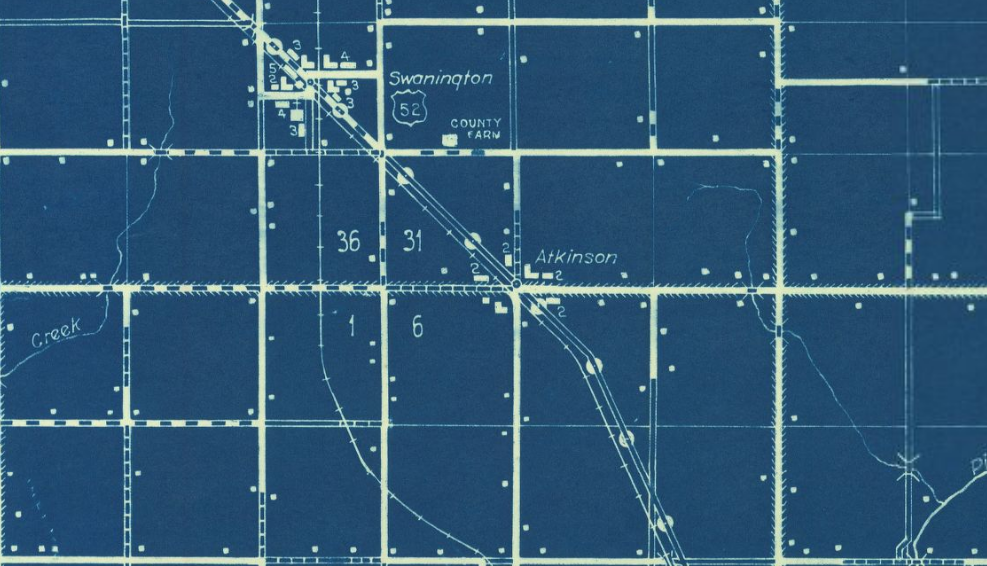
Atkinson and Swanington, Indiana, in Center Township

A post office was established at Atkinson in 1873, and remained in operation until it was discontinued in 1923. The town was named for Cephas Atkinson, the son of Thomas and Francis Head Atkinson and served as a shipping point on the Big Four railway. Atkinson was noted as one of the seven Benton County towns on the Big Four railway when Elmore Barce listed these seven towns in The History of Benton County, Indiana, from northwest to southeast: "Raub, Earl Park, Fowler, Swanington, Atkinson, Templeton and Otterbein."

In 1882, the Western Telephone Company of Chicago established telephone service in Benton County, with offices in Atkinson, Fowler, Templeton, Oxford, and Otterbein.

A 1916 lightning storm in Atkinson "opened a hole in the road eight feet in diameter and four feet deep", killing a man and his team of horses, and destroying a wagon.

Despite its small size, during the 1920s, Atkinson was called a "thriving little village" in the Oxford (Indiana) Gazette.

=== Education ===
The first school in the Atkinson area was named the Gwin School, built in 1857 one mile south of Atkinson and which burned down a few years after. Later, a "fine brick" schoolhouse was completed in Atkinson in 1906.

In the 1960s, a new school, Benton Central School, was built at Atkinson Station. This complex is now known as Benton Central Junior-Senior High. Prairie Crossing Elementary School opened in October 2006.

=== Demographics ===
Atkinson historical population
Year	Pop.	±%
1890	50	—
1900	41	−18.0%
1920	46	+12.2%

Despite its location on a major rail line, Atkinson's population remained small. The population of the community was 50 in 1890, and just 41 in 1900. The population of the community was recorded as 46 in 1920. Its population in the 1920s was from 10 to 15.
