= Neal Musser =

American baseball player (born 1980)

- Relief pitcher
- Born: August 25, 1980 (age 46); Otterbein, Indiana
- Batted: Left Threw: Left

MLB debut
- April 21, 2007, for the Kansas City Royals

Last MLB appearance
- May 29, 2008, for the Kansas City Royals

MLB statistics
- Win–loss record: 0–1
- Earned run average: 4.21
- Strikeouts: 19
- Stats at Baseball Reference

Teams
- Kansas City Royals (2007–2008)
Medals
Men's baseball
Representing United States
Baseball World Cup
Gold medal – first place	2007 Tianmu	National team

Neal Gordon Musser (born August 25, 1980) is a former American Major League Baseball pitcher.

== Early life ==
Musser was born on August 25, 1980, in Otterbein, Indiana. He spent his high school years at Benton Central Junior-Senior High School in nearby Oxford, Indiana.

== Professional career ==
Musser was drafted by the New York Mets in the second round (73rd overall) of the 1999 Major League Baseball draft. He was signed on June 23, 1999. After spending six years in the Mets organization, he was granted free agency on October 15, 2005.

On January 30, 2006, Musser signed as a free agent with the Arizona Diamondbacks. On May 23, 2006, he was released by the Diamondbacks. A day after his release, he signed as a free agent with the Kansas City Royals. On October 15, 2006, he was granted free agency. On November 20, 2006, he re-signed with the Royals.

Musser was optioned to the Triple-A Omaha Royals to begin the 2007 season. He was recalled to the majors for the first time on April 20, and made his major league debut the next day against the Minnesota Twins, allowing two hits and an unearned run in 1/3 of an inning. After making two appearances, Musser was optioned to Omaha on April 24. Overall, Musser was 0–1 with a 4.38 ERA in 17 relief appearances with Kansas City, and went 4–1 with eight saves and a minuscule 0.49 ERA in 32 games with Omaha.

Musser made a single appearance for the Royals in 2008, tossing a scoreless inning in a 5–1 loss to the Twins. He spent the majority of the season with Triple-A Omaha, going 3–5 with six saves and a 4.34 ERA in 37 games (three starts).

On February 19, 2009, Musser was designated for assignment to make way for the newly claimed Tug Hulett from the Seattle Mariners, and he was subsequently released eight days later.

On March 5, 2009, Musser signed a minor league deal with the Houston Astros. On May 4, 2009, he was released. On February 2, 2010, Musser signed as a free agent with the New York Mets. He ended his career with the Lancaster Barnstormers of the Atlantic League of Professional Baseball in 2010. He played with multiple MiLB teams over his career, including the Gulf Coast Mets, Kingsport Mets, Capital City Bombers, St. Lucie Mets, Brooklyn Cyclones, Norfolk Tides, Wichita Wranglers, Omaha Royals, Arizona Royals, and the Round Rock Express.

== Post-career ==
After his baseball career, Musser moved back to his hometown of Otterbein, Indiana, with a family and working on his family's farm.
