= Otterbein, Indiana =

- Town
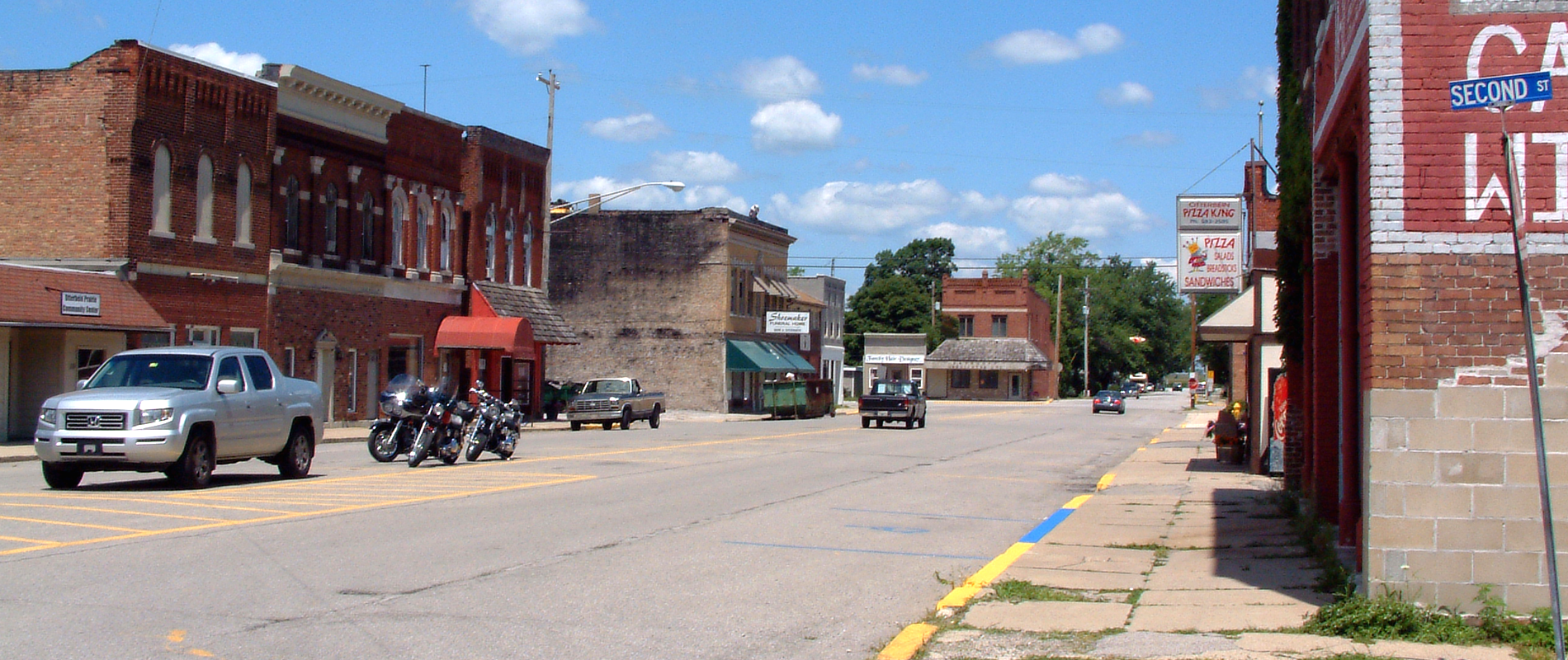
- The view north along Main Street.

- Logo
- Nickname: The Town Between Two Counties
- Location of Otterbein in Tippecanoe County and Benton County, Indiana.

- Map of Otterbein

- Otterbein's location in Benton County
- Coordinates: 40°29′19″N 87°05′14″W
- Country: United States
- State: Indiana
- Counties: Tippecanoe, Benton
- Townships: Shelby, Bolivar
- Platted: October 25, 1872
- Named for: William Otterbein Brown

Area
  - Total: 1.29 sq mi (3.33 km^{2})
  - Land: 1.28 sq mi (3.32 km^{2})
  - Water: 0 sq mi (0.00 km^{2})
- Elevation: 705 ft (215 m)

Population (2020)
  - Total: 1,144
  - Density: 892.0/sq mi (344.39/km^{2})
- Time zone: UTC-5 (EST)
  - Summer (DST): UTC-4 (EDT)
- ZIP code: 47970
- Area code: 765
- FIPS code: 18-57258
- GNIS feature ID: 2396841
- Website: otterbein.in.gov

Otterbein is a town in Shelby Township, Tippecanoe County and Bolivar Township, Benton County, Indiana, named for William Otterbein Brown who donated land for the town. As of the 2020 census, its population was 1,144.

It is part of the Lafayette, Indiana metropolitan area.

== History ==
Originally a site known as Pond Grove, Otterbein's first 60 lots were laid out by John Levering and his wife on October 25, 1872, with an addition by Mary A. Clancey on April 24, 1883. The first home was built by Dr. John K. Thompson and the first business, a general store, by Henry H. Moore. William Otterbein Brown, the farmer and stock-dealer for whom the town was named, held the office of postmaster until his death on February 18, 1879. Otterbein High School ran from 1910 to 1966, when the consolidated Benton Community School Corporation came into existence. The gym and most of the building burned in a fire in 1975.

As of 2023, Otterbein has two churches, Catholic and United Methodist, 4 restaurants, 2 sporting goods stores, a thrift shop, an elementary school, and a public library.

At one time, two sets of Nickel Plate Railroad tracks ran through the town. One set of tracks has since been removed, and the other is used by Kankakee, Beaverville and Southern Railroad. Since the end of 2008, the railroad right-of-way has been used for the placement of poles that carry electric power from the wind turbines in western Benton County to the substation at Montmorenci.

Kerkhoff Truss Plant and Rowe Trucking Inc occupy the industrial park at the east edge of town, which is actually in Tippecanoe County. The Otterbein post office has been in operation since 1872.

== Geography ==
Otterbein occupies mostly flat, open farm land on the eastern border of Benton County in Bolivar Township, with eastern sections of the community extending into Tippecanoe County. U.S. Route 52 passes along its north side and the Kankakee, Beaverville and Southern Railroad cuts through town to the south.

According to the 2020 census, Otterbein has a total area of 1.284 square miles (3.33 km^{2}), of which 1.283 square miles (3.32 km^{2}) is land and 0.001 square miles (0.0026 km^{2}) is water.

Oxford Street, old US 52, is the central east–west street and the only blinking traffic light in town is located at its junction with Main Street. Otterbein is known for its extremely wide, block-long Main Street that accommodates two rows of parallel parking in the middle of the street.

== Demographics ==
Historical population
Census	Pop.	Note	%±
1910	652		—
1920	702		7.7%
1930	616		−12.3%
1940	570		−7.5%
1950	641		12.5%
1960	788		22.9%
1970	916		16.2%
1980	1,118		22.1%
1990	1,291		15.5%
2000	1,312		1.6%
2010	1,262		−3.8%
2020	1,144		−9.4%
U.S. Decennial Census

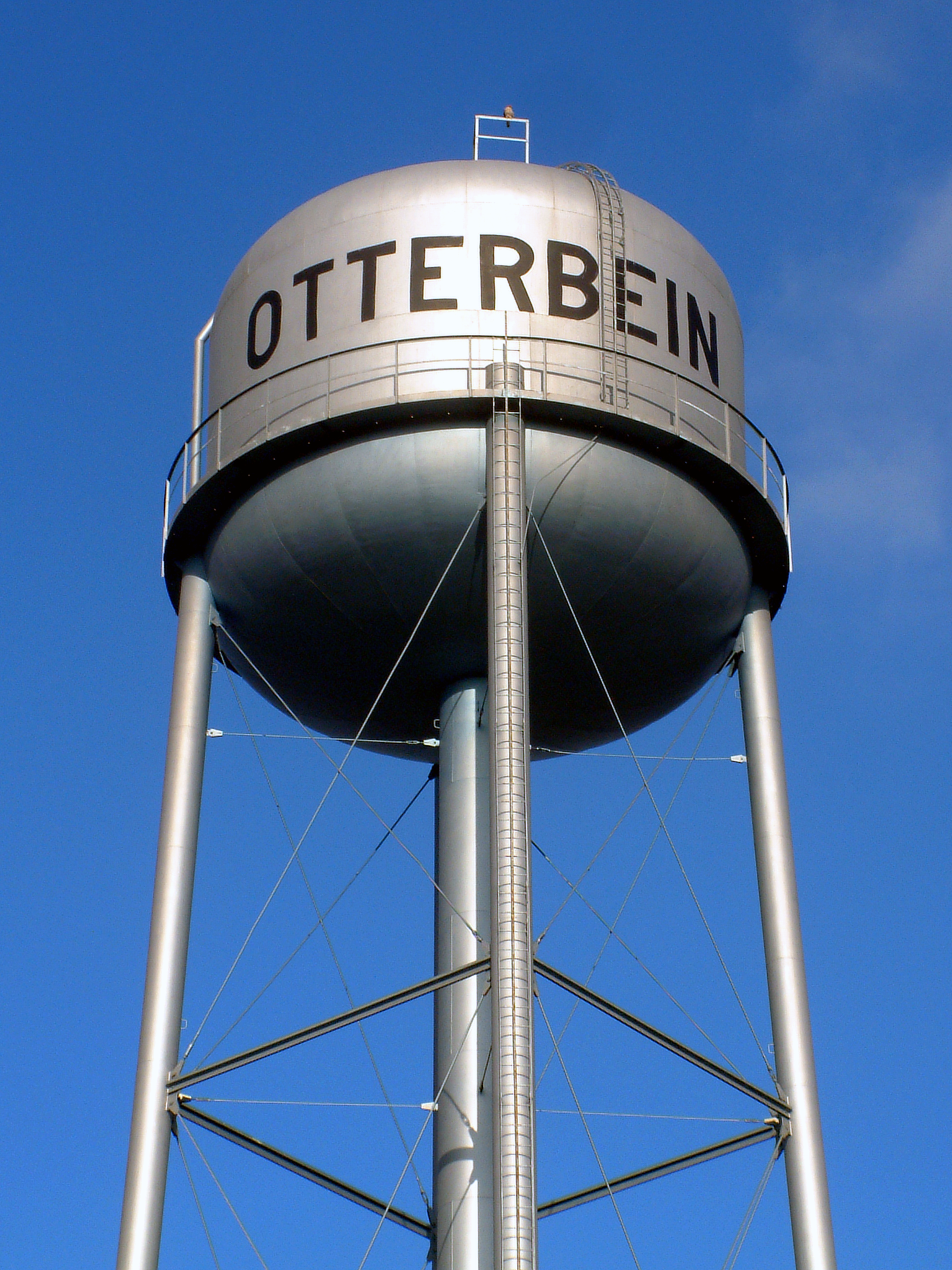
The Otterbein water tower.

=== 2020 census ===
As of the 2020 census, Otterbein had a population of 1,144. The median age was 36.0 years. 25.6% of residents were under the age of 18 and 16.2% of residents were 65 years of age or older. For every 100 females there were 100.4 males, and for every 100 females age 18 and over there were 90.0 males age 18 and over.

0.0% of residents lived in urban areas, while 100.0% lived in rural areas.

There were 465 households in Otterbein, of which 34.8% had children under the age of 18 living in them. Of all households, 46.2% were married-couple households, 21.1% were households with a male householder and no spouse or partner present, and 25.8% were households with a female householder and no spouse or partner present. About 27.5% of all households were made up of individuals and 11.6% had someone living alone who was 65 years of age or older.

There were 522 housing units, of which 10.9% were vacant. The homeowner vacancy rate was 0.9% and the rental vacancy rate was 17.9%.

Racial composition as of the 2020 census
Race	Number	Percent
White	1,062	92.8%
Black or African American	5	0.4%
American Indian and Alaska Native	3	0.3%
Asian	7	0.6%
Native Hawaiian and Other Pacific Islander	0	0.0%
Some other race	19	1.7%
Two or more races	48	4.2%
Hispanic or Latino (of any race)	58	5.1%

=== 2010 census ===
As of the census of 2010, there were 1,262 people, 502 households, and 335 families living in the town. The population density was 2,068.9 inhabitants per square mile (798.8/km^{2}). There were 550 housing units at an average density of 901.6 per square mile (348.1/km^{2}). The racial makeup of the town was 96.8% White (1211), 0.7% African American (9), 0.3% Native American (3), 0.1% Asian (1), 0.1% Pacific Islander, 0.8% from other races, and 1.2% from two or more races (13). Hispanic or Latino of any race were 3.1% of the population (38).

There were 502 households, of which 38.4% had children under the age of 18 living with them, 46.4% were married couples living together, 12.5% had a female householder with no husband present, 7.8% had a male householder with no wife present, and 33.3% were non-families. 27.1% of all households were made up of individuals, and 11.8% had someone living alone who was 65 years of age or older. The average household size was 2.51 and the average family size was 3.04.

The median age in the town was 32.4 years. 28% of residents were under the age of 18; 9.1% were between the ages of 18 and 24; 28.8% were from 25 to 44; 23.1% were from 45 to 64; and 11.1% were 65 years of age or older. The gender makeup of the town was 49.2% male and 50.8% female.

=== 2000 census ===
As of the census of 2000, there were 1,312 people, 498 households, and 359 families living in the town. The population density was 2,291.9 inhabitants per square mile (884.9/km^{2}). There were 518 housing units at an average density of 904.9 per square mile (349.4/km^{2}). The racial makeup of the town was 98.02% White, 0.23% African American, 0.23% Native American, 0.61% from other races, and 0.91% from two or more races. Hispanic or Latino of any race were 1.07% of the population.

There were 498 households, out of which 42.4% had children under the age of 18 living with them, 54.2% were married couples living together, 12.2% had a female householder with no husband present, and 27.9% were non-families. 24.5% of all households were made up of individuals, and 11.8% had someone living alone who was 65 years of age or older. The average household size was 2.63 and the average family size was 3.11.

In the town, the population was spread out, with 30.8% under the age of 18, 8.8% from 18 to 24, 31.6% from 25 to 44, 17.1% from 45 to 64, and 11.6% who were 65 years of age or older. The median age was 32 years. For every 100 females, there were 96.1 males. For every 100 females age 18 and over, there were 86.8 males.

The median income for a household in the town was $40,524, and the median income for a family was $45,341. Males had a median income of $31,000 versus $20,944 for females. The per capita income for the town was $17,128. About 4.8% of families and 6.9% of the population were below the poverty line, including 6.8% of those under age 18 and 9.9% of those age 65 or over.

== Notable people ==
- Richard Atha, Indiana State and NBA player, member Indiana Basketball Hall of Fame
- Adam Kennedy (1922–1997), actor, author, and painter
- Neal Musser, professional baseball player
- Donald E. Williams (1942–2016), Commander NASA space shuttle

== Education ==
Residents are in the Benton Community School Corporation. Students attend Otterbein Elementary School (kindergarten through sixth grade) and then continue their education at Benton Central Junior-Senior High School in Atkinson.
