= WIBN =

Radio station in Earl Park, Indiana

Coordinates: 40.573°N 87.453°W

- Earl Park, Indiana; United States
- Broadcast area: Lafayette metropolitan area
- Frequency: 98.1 MHz
- Branding: 98.1 Gold

Programming
- Format: Oldies

Ownership
- Owner: Brothers Broadcasting Corporation

History
- First air date: 1983 (at 98.3)
- Former frequencies: 98.3 MHz (1983–1988)
- Call sign meaning: Iroquois, Benton, Newton

Technical information
- Licensing authority: FCC
- Facility ID: 28200
- Class: B1
- ERP: 25,000 watts
- HAAT: 100 meters (330 ft)

Links
- Public license information: Public file; LMS
- Webcast: Listen live
- Website: 981wibn.com

WIBN (98.1 FM, "98.1 Gold") is a commercial radio station licensed to Earl Park, Indiana, United States, featuring an oldies format. Owned by Brothers Broadcasting Corporation, the station's studios are located at 130 E. McConnell Street in Oxford, while the transmitter is sited in Dunnington.

== History ==
WIBN signed on the air in 1983 at 98.3 on the FM dial originally built and owned by Frank and Sandra Hertel of Evansville, IN. The station originally broadcast at 3,000 watts and served specifically the communities of Earl Park, Fowler and Kentland. The studio and tower were both located in Earl Park. Initially, the format was a mix of country and Adult contemporary music. The station had stints doing each of the aforementioned formats exclusively throughout the 1980s.

By the mid-1980s, the station was purchased by Lafayette, Indiana radio pioneer Sidney Thompson. His company, known as IBN Broadcasting, began looking into ways to make the station more powerful as well as more profitable. The 98.3 frequency was very cluttered in northwestern Indiana at the time with three other stations occupying the frequency within a 100-mile radius of WIBN. In 1988, the FCC granted a request to move WIBN to 98.1 and strengthen its power from 3,000 watts to 25,000 watts. This power increase would also provide the station with primary coverage to larger Illinois towns such as Watseka and Hoopeston and secondary coverage to Greater Lafayette. Once the move to 98.1 was complete, WIBN became an Adult contemporary station with programming provided by Satellite Music Network's Starstation format.

In the mid-90s, Brothers Broadcasting Corporation, headed by John Balvich, purchased the station. The station maintained its affiliation with Starstation but renamed itself "Interstate 98" or "I-98" for short. As I-98, WIBN featured a mix of music, farm reports, and sports, both local and national.

In 2001, it was decided that a new direction was necessary for the station. It was widely speculated that WIBN would attempt to program toward the Lafayette market, especially as many former Lafayette radio personalities and managers were hired in to oversee operations. Format speculations ranged from alternative rock to hot AC. By the Spring, it was decided that WIBN would become Hot adult contemporary as B 98. However, the decision was pulled right before the launch when Lafayette's WNJY changed format and became B 102.9. The station remained I-98 and kept its affiliation with ABC Radio's Hits and Favorites format (formerly Starstation) until October 1, 2001, when the station flipped to Oldies as "98 Gold" utilizing ABC Radio Networks Pure Gold format.

Today, WIBN continues to program an oldies format and now uses Westwood One Networks Good Time Oldies. The station runs Brownfield farm reports and regional news. High school sports broadcasts run from mid-August with one football game per week, including post-season action. Then from November thru March, high school basketball games feature Benton Central and other area teams.(WIBN carries both boys' and girls' basketball). WIBN also broadcasts from area 4-H county fairs.

In April 2010 WIBN's tower was knocked over by heavy farm equipment, which fell onto the building housing its transmitter, taking the station off the air. WIBN continued to stream online while the station was off the air. WIBN went back on the air at 8 pm on July 27, 2010.

In February 2014, Matt Wilson joined WIBN with Marvelous Matt in the Morning. Matt has fresh contests, plays some rare tracks and provides local sports score updates from 6 AM to 10 AM.

Matt left for about six months to pursue another interest, in which time Charlie Harrigan came on to do mornings. Matt returned in December 2015.

== Programming ==
All Times Eastern

WIBN mainly plays pop hits from 1955–1979 with supplemental 80s tunes from popular 60s and 70s artists.

Weekday Mornings: Marvelous Matt 6 AM - 11 AM EST.

Matt has:

The Beatles Wake Up

Time Tunnel Instrumental

Oldies' Salute

Forgotten 45

Daily Top 5

Oldies News Report

Name That Movie!

Twin Spin Tuesdays

Throwback Thursdays

Featured Artist Fridays

Pet Savers

Special shows:

  - Saturday**

9 am - 10:30 am The Big Bargain Show with Matt and Deb.

12pm - 3pm MG Kelly's American Hit List.

  - Sunday**

5:30 am Issues Today.

8 am-12Noon MG Kelly's Back to the 70's.
