= LaGrange, Tippecanoe County, Indiana =

LaGrange
- Ghost town
- Tippecanoe County's location in Indiana

- Location in Tippecanoe County
- Coordinates: 40°22′28″N 87°05′24″W
- Country: United States
- State: Indiana
- County: Tippecanoe
- Township: Shelby
- Time zone: UTC-5 (Eastern (EST))
  - Summer (DST): UTC-4 (EDT)
- ZIP code: 47906
- Area code: 765

LaGrange was a small town, now extinct, in Shelby Township, Tippecanoe County, in the U.S. state of Indiana.

== History ==
LaGrange was founded in 1827 by Isaac Shelby, and was named for the Marquis de Lafayette's ancestral home in France. The community was laid out with eight streets and a hotel. The decline of riverboat trade and the decision to build the Wabash Railroad on the other side of the Wabash River led to the town's extinction.

A post office was established at LaGrange in 1828, and remained in operation until it was discontinued in 1835.

== Geography ==
LaGrange was likely located at 40°22′28″N 87°05′24″W.
