= Benton Central Junior-Senior High School =

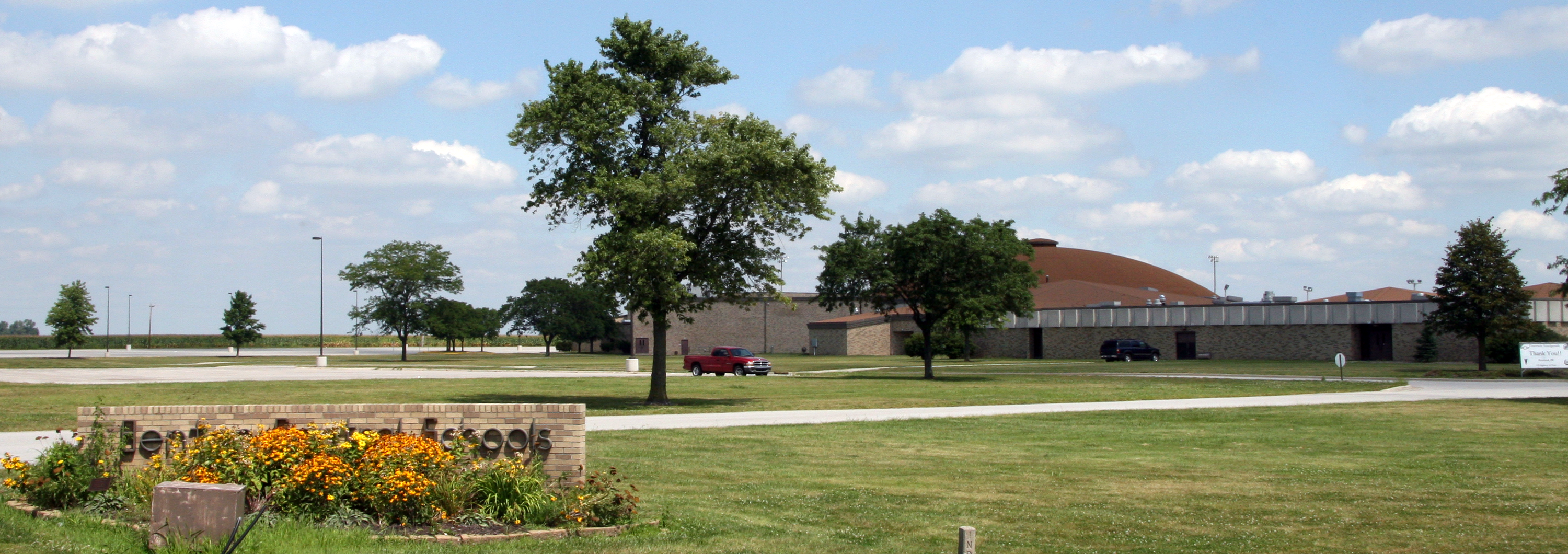
- Benton Central in August, 2008

Location
- 4241 East 300 South; Oxford postal address, Indiana 47971; United States; 40.564449°N 87.242592°W

Information
- Type: Public high school
- Established: 1968
- School district: Benton Community School Corporation
- Superintendent: Annette Zupin
- NCES School ID: 180048000097
- Principal: Corey Robb
- Teaching staff: 60.50 (on an FTE basis)
- Grades: 7-12
- Enrollment: 790 (2023–2024)
- Student to teacher ratio: 13.06
- Color
- Athletics conference: Hoosier Athletic Conference
- Mascot: Bison
- Website: bc.benton.k12.in.us

Benton Central Junior-Senior High School is the only high school in Benton County, Indiana. It is located in Center Township, 5 miles (8.0 km) southeast of Fowler. In proximity to Atkinson, it is a part of the Benton Community School Corporation. The school mascot is the Bison.

The district includes Fowler, Ambia, Boswell, Earl Park, Otterbein, Oxford, Templeton, Montmorenci, Green Hill, and Tab.

== History ==
Benton Central was a 1960s consolidation of Ambia, Boswell, Earl Park, Fowler, Freeland Park, Montmorenci, Pine Township, Oxford, Otterbein, and Wadena schools. The number of elementary schools sending students to Benton Central has declined steadily since then, and only two are left. The first graduating class (1969) selected by vote the mascot, colors, and school name (choices were Benton Central or Benton Prairie).

Planning for the school, including the creation of the floor plan, occurred in mid-1966. The scheduled opening was in fall 1968. A portion of the funding for the school came from the United States federal government. The architect and the school district administration were to work together to have the school built. There had been weather-related and employment-related delays that postponed the start of classes in 1968. When the school opened, there was a junior high school shift and a senior high school shift. The following week was to have classes converted to full day. The cafeteria had not yet been in operation when the school first opened.

In September 1969 there was a student protest against the cafeteria. Students used sack lunches for the time being.

== Campus ==
The library began book lending services on November 12, 1968. When it opened, it had books, microfilms, and audio records. Cora McGuire, the librarian at the time, described it as a "total media concept".

== Activities ==
Benton Central encourages its students to be involved by offering several choices in sports, clubs, activities, and vocational classes. Boys sports include football, soccer, cross-country, wrestling, basketball, swimming, track and field, baseball, tennis, and golf. Girls sports include soccer, cross-country, basketball, swimming, track & field, softball, tennis, golf, and volleyball.

The arts department has a variety of offerings including several visual arts classes, Choir, Band, Music History, and Music Theory. In addition to band classes, the Band Department also offers extra-curricular Marching Band, Jazz Band, Pep Band, & Color Guard programs. The Theater department presents two productions a year, a musical in the spring and a play in the fall. Creative writing is also emphasized through an annual publication of a literary magazine named The Phoenix. The Phoenix has an accompanying website at https://bcphoenixmagazine.wixsite.com/bcphoenix.

Other activities at Benton Central include: Academic Teams, Anime Art Club, Outdoors Club, B.C. Courage, C.A.A.P., Cheerleading, Rhythmettes Dance Team, Chess Club, FCA, FFA, French Club, Friends of Rachel Club, Guitar Club, Helping Hands, National Honor Society, Spanish Club, Speech & Debate, Student Council, Super High Mileage Challenge, B.C. Media Team, Ultimate Frisbee, & Yearbook.

The school is administered by the Benton Community School Corporation.

== Notable alumni ==
- Charles F. Conner, former United States Deputy Secretary of Agriculture
- Neal Musser, former MLB player for the New York Mets, Arizona Diamondbacks, Kansas City Royals and Houston Astros
- Dick Atha, (Otterbein High alumnus) former NBA player for the New York Knicks and the Detroit Pistons. Member of the Indiana Basketball Hall of Fame

== See also ==
- List of high schools in Indiana
