= Shelby Township, Tippecanoe County, Indiana =

Shelby Township
- Township
- Location in Tippecanoe County
- Coordinates: 40°28′51″N 87°03′01″W
- Country: United States
- State: Indiana
- County: Tippecanoe

Government
  - Type: Indiana township

Area
  - Total: 54.17 sq mi (140.3 km^{2})
  - Land: 53.65 sq mi (139.0 km^{2})
  - Water: 0.51 sq mi (1.3 km^{2}) 0.94%
- Elevation: 699 ft (213 m)

Population (2020)
  - Total: 2,567
  - Density: 43.8/sq mi (16.9/km^{2})
- Time zone: UTC-5 (Eastern (EST))
  - Summer (DST): UTC-4 (EDT)
- ZIP codes: 47906, 47970
- Area code: 765
- GNIS feature ID: 453847

Shelby Township is one of thirteen townships in Tippecanoe County, Indiana, United States. As of the 2010 census, its population was 2,352 and it contained 920 housing units.

== Geography ==
According to the 2010 census, the township has a total area of 54.17 square miles (140.3 km^{2}), of which 53.65 square miles (139.0 km^{2}) (or 99.04%) is land and 0.51 square miles (1.3 km^{2}) (or 0.94%) is water.

=== Cities, towns, villages ===
- Otterbein (east half)

=== Unincorporated communities ===
- Montmorenci at 40.4742011°N 87.0294574°W

(This list is based on USGS data and may include former settlements.)

=== Extinct towns ===
- LaGrange

=== Adjacent townships ===
- Round Grove Township, White County (north)
- Wabash Township (east)
- Wayne Township (south)
- Davis Township, Fountain County (southwest)
- Medina Township, Warren County (southwest)
- Warren Township, Warren County (southwest)
- Bolivar Township, Benton County (west)
- Pine Township, Benton County (northwest)

=== Cemeteries ===
The township contains these four cemeteries: Asbury, Shambaugh, Spencer, and Montmorenci.

=== Major highways ===
- US Route 52
- US Route 231

=== Airports and landing strips ===
- Sutton Airport

== Education ==
- Benton Community School Corporation
- Tippecanoe School Corporation

== Political districts ==
- Indiana's 4th congressional district
- State House District 26
- State Senate District 22
