= Fowler Theatre =

- U.S. National Register of Historic Places
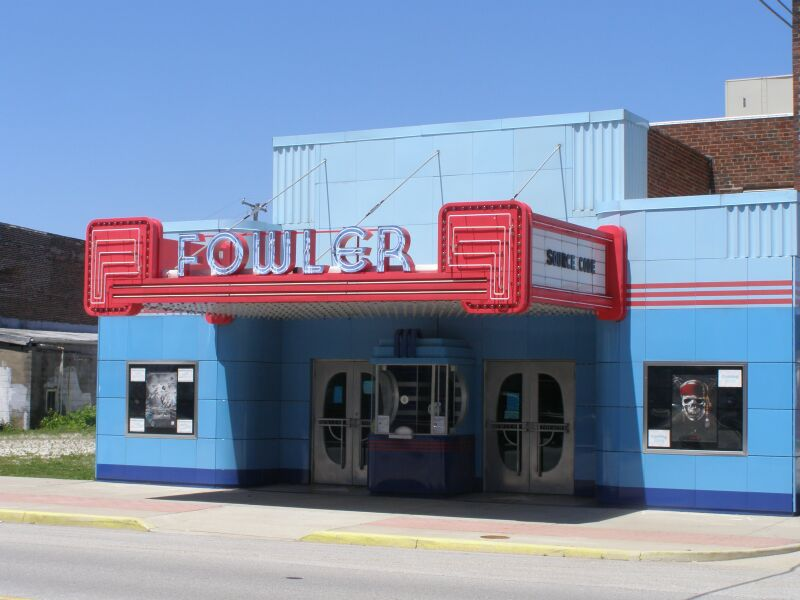
- Fowler Theater, May 2001

- Location within Benton County, Indiana Location within Indiana Location within the United States
- Location: 111 E. 5th St., Fowler, Indiana
- Coordinates: 40°37′05″N 87°19′22″W
- Area: less than one acre
- Built: 1940
- Architect: Eugene, Alexander K.
- Architectural style: Moderne, Art Deco
- NRHP reference No.: 04001315
- Added to NRHP: December 6, 2004

Fowler Theatre is a historic theater located at Fowler, Indiana. It was built in 1940, and is a one-storey, Art Deco style movie theater. It is a red brick building on a concrete foundation and features the original marquee. The interior has Art Deco and Art Moderne decorative elements.

It was listed on the National Register of Historic Places in 2004.
