= Montmorenci, Indiana =

- Census-designated place
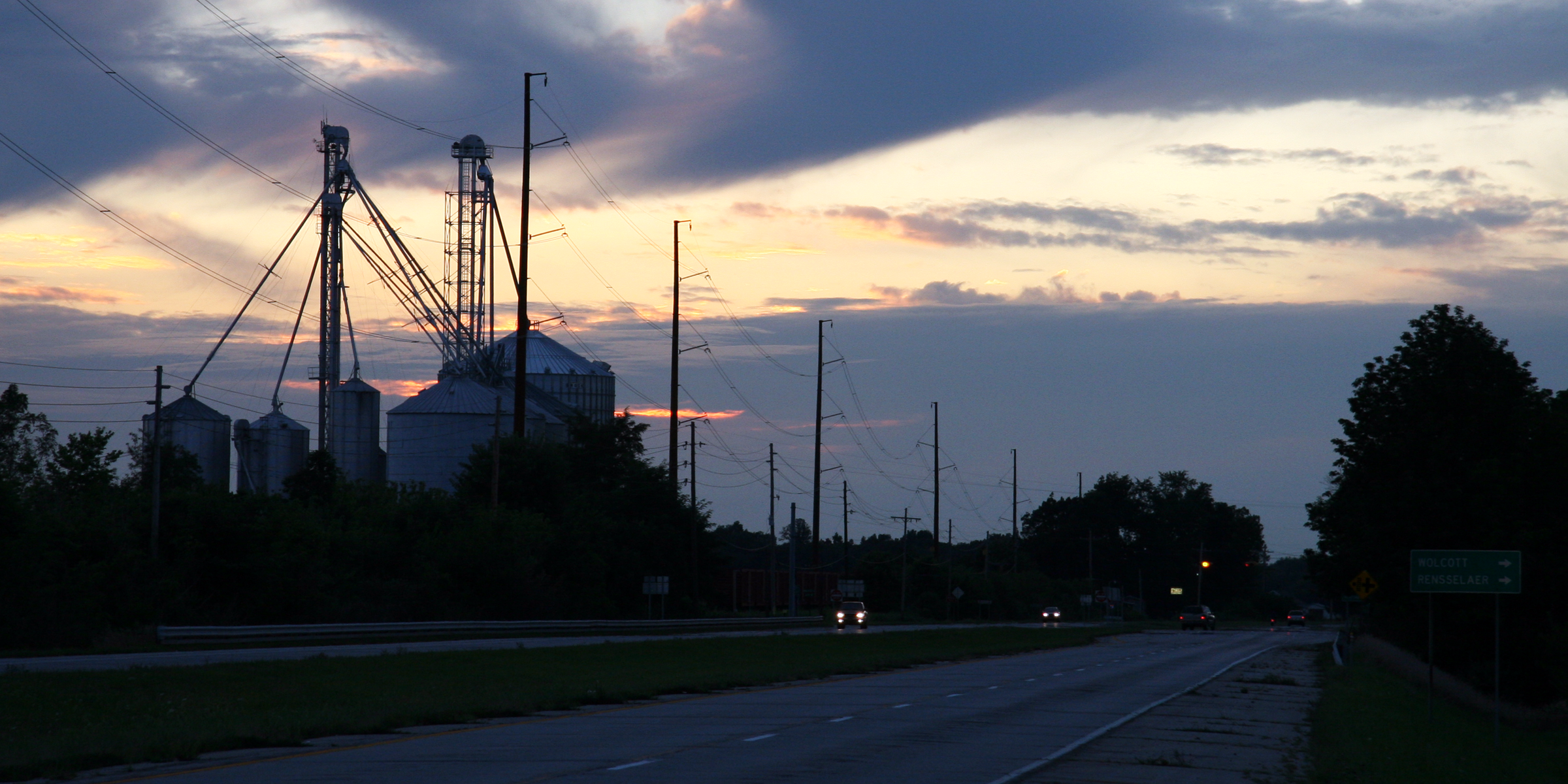
- Montmorenci's grain elevators silhouetted at dusk

- Location of Montmorenci in Tippecanoe County, Indiana.
- Coordinates: 40°28′09″N 87°01′06″W
- Country: United States
- State: Indiana
- County: Tippecanoe
- Township: Shelby

Area
  - Total: 1.59 sq mi (4.13 km^{2})
  - Land: 1.59 sq mi (4.12 km^{2})
  - Water: 0.0039 sq mi (0.01 km^{2})
- Elevation: 692 ft (211 m)

Population (2020)
  - Total: 173
  - Density: 108.8/sq mi (41.99/km^{2})
- Time zone: UTC-5 (Eastern (EST))
  - Summer (DST): UTC-4 (EDT)
- ZIP code: 47906
- Area code: 765
- GNIS feature ID: 2583460

Montmorenci is an unincorporated census-designated place in Shelby Township, Tippecanoe County, Indiana. As of the 2020 census, Montmorenci had a population of 173. Older maps sometimes spell the name Montmorency or Montmorencie.

It is part of the Lafayette, Indiana Metropolitan Statistical Area.

== History ==
An old variant name of the community was called Bringham's Grove.

A post office was established under the name Bringham's Grove in 1846, and was renamed to Montmorenci in 1853. It is currently not in operation.

== Geography ==
Montmorenci is located at 40°28'28" North, 87°01'46" West (40.474444, -87.029444) in Shelby Township, at the intersection of U.S. Routes 52 and 231. It has an elevation of 699 feet.

== Demographics ==
Historical population
Census	Pop.	Note	%±
2020	173		—
U.S. Decennial Census

== Education ==
A brick school was built in 1913 at a cost of $40,000. By 1923, this school housed classes from grades 1 to 12, and all other schools in the immediate district closed. Montmorenci School met a similar fate in 1966, closing as part of a consolidation that moved the upper grades into the new Benton Central Jr./Sr. High School.

Even though Montmorenci is in Tippecanoe County, all public education is provided by the Benton Community School Corporation from neighboring Benton County. Students attend Otterbein Elementary in grades K–6, then move on to Benton Central Junior-Senior High School in grades 7–12.

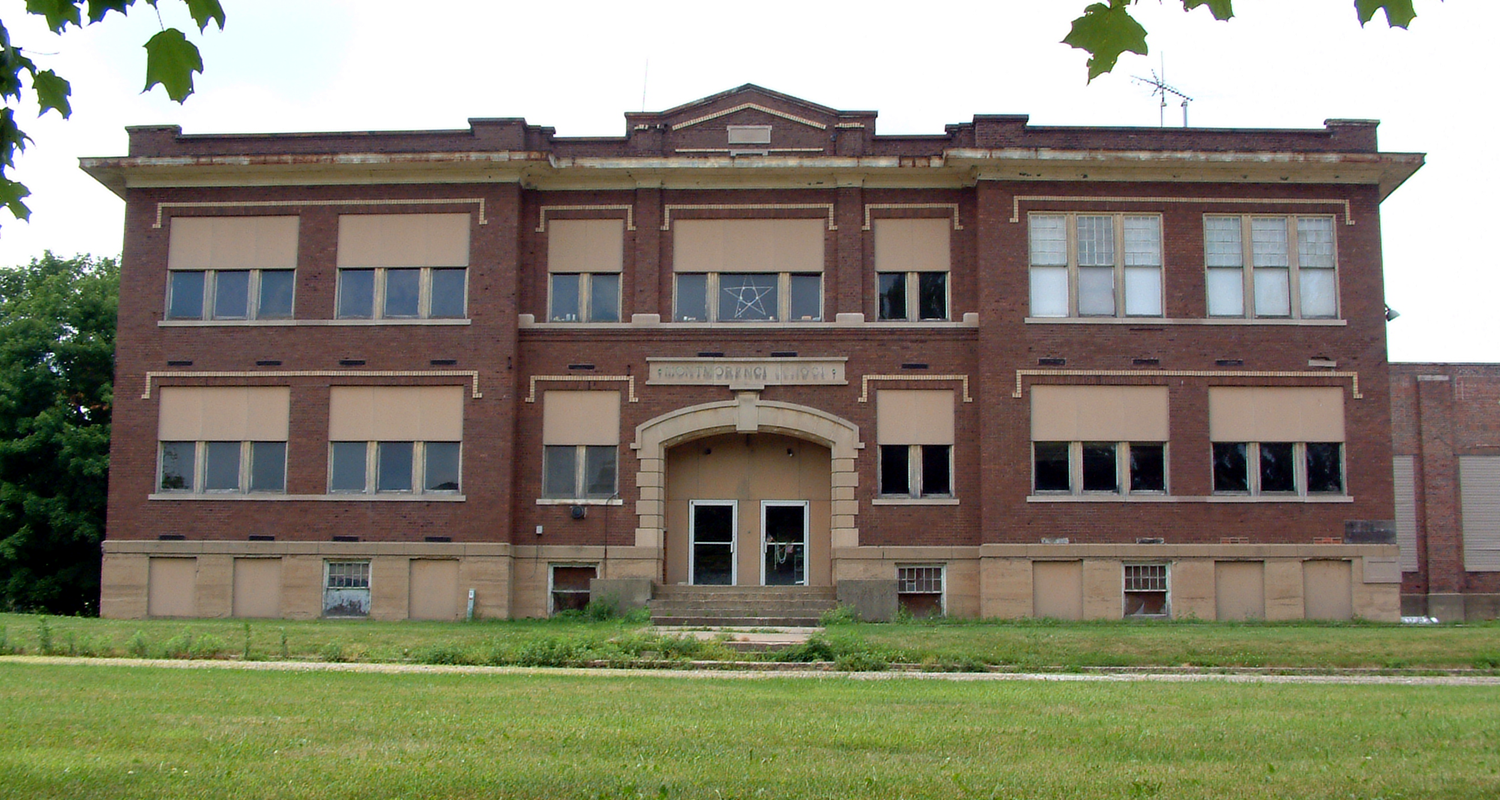
The old Montmorenci School building.

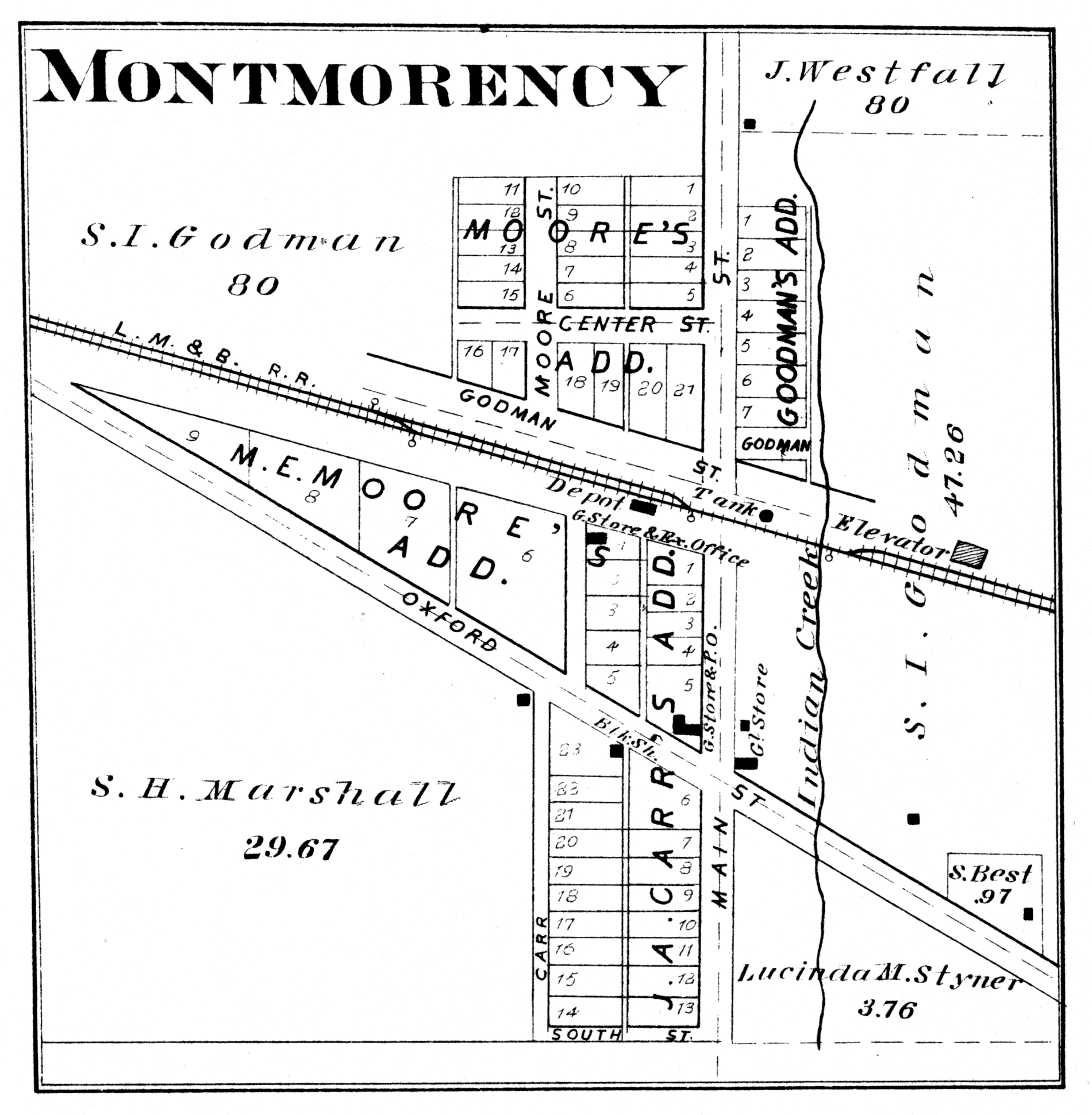
Montmorenci in 1878.

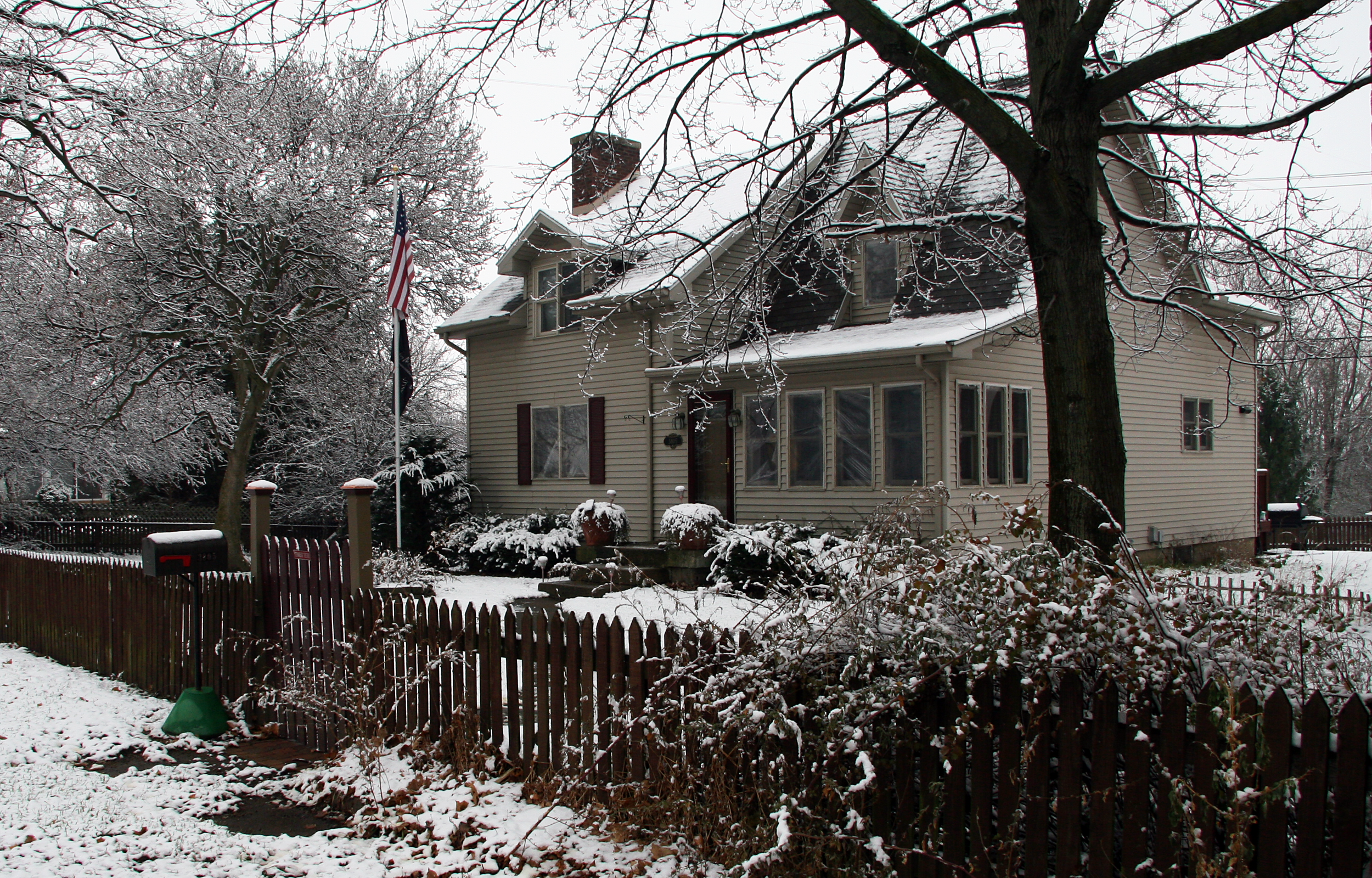
A home along Walnut Street.
