= David S. Heath House =

Historic house in Indiana, United States

- U.S. National Register of Historic Places
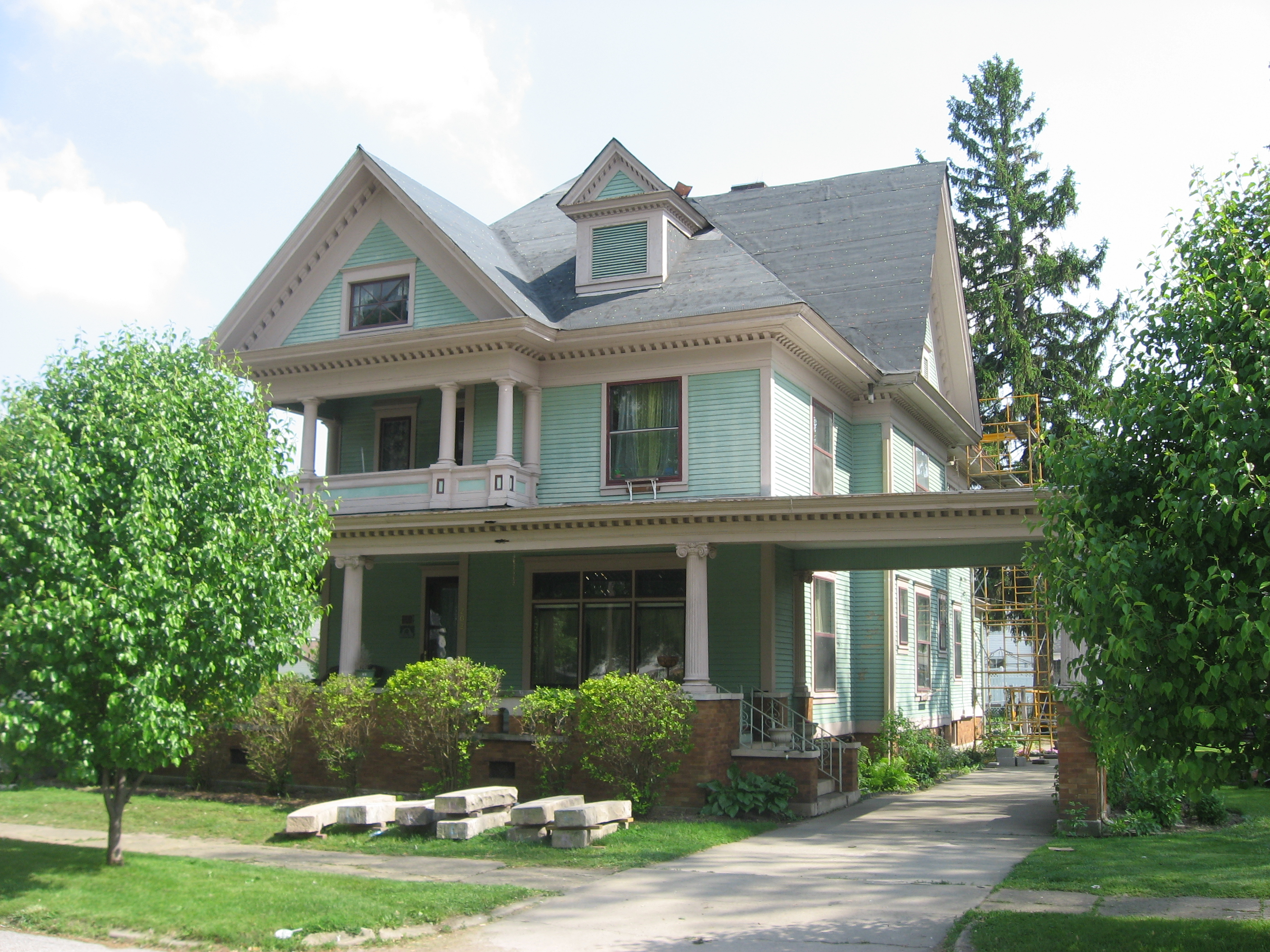
- David S. Heath House, May 2011

- Location within Benton County, Indiana Location within Indiana Location within the United States
- Location: 202 W. McConnell, Oxford, Indiana
- Coordinates: 40°31′10″N 87°15′6″W
- Area: less than one acre
- Built: 1908
- Built by: Brown, George S.
- Architectural style: Queen Anne
- NRHP reference No.: 99001153
- Added to NRHP: September 17, 1999

David S. Heath House, also known as The Green House and Heath-Steele-Gretencord House, is a historic home located at Oxford, Indiana. It was built in 1908 and is a 2½-story, Queen Anne style frame dwelling. It features a one-story wraparound porch with porte cochere and projecting gabled bays. Also on the property is a contributing two-story frame carriage house.

It was listed on the National Register of Historic Places in 1999.
