= Fraser & Isham Law Office =

- U.S. National Register of Historic Places
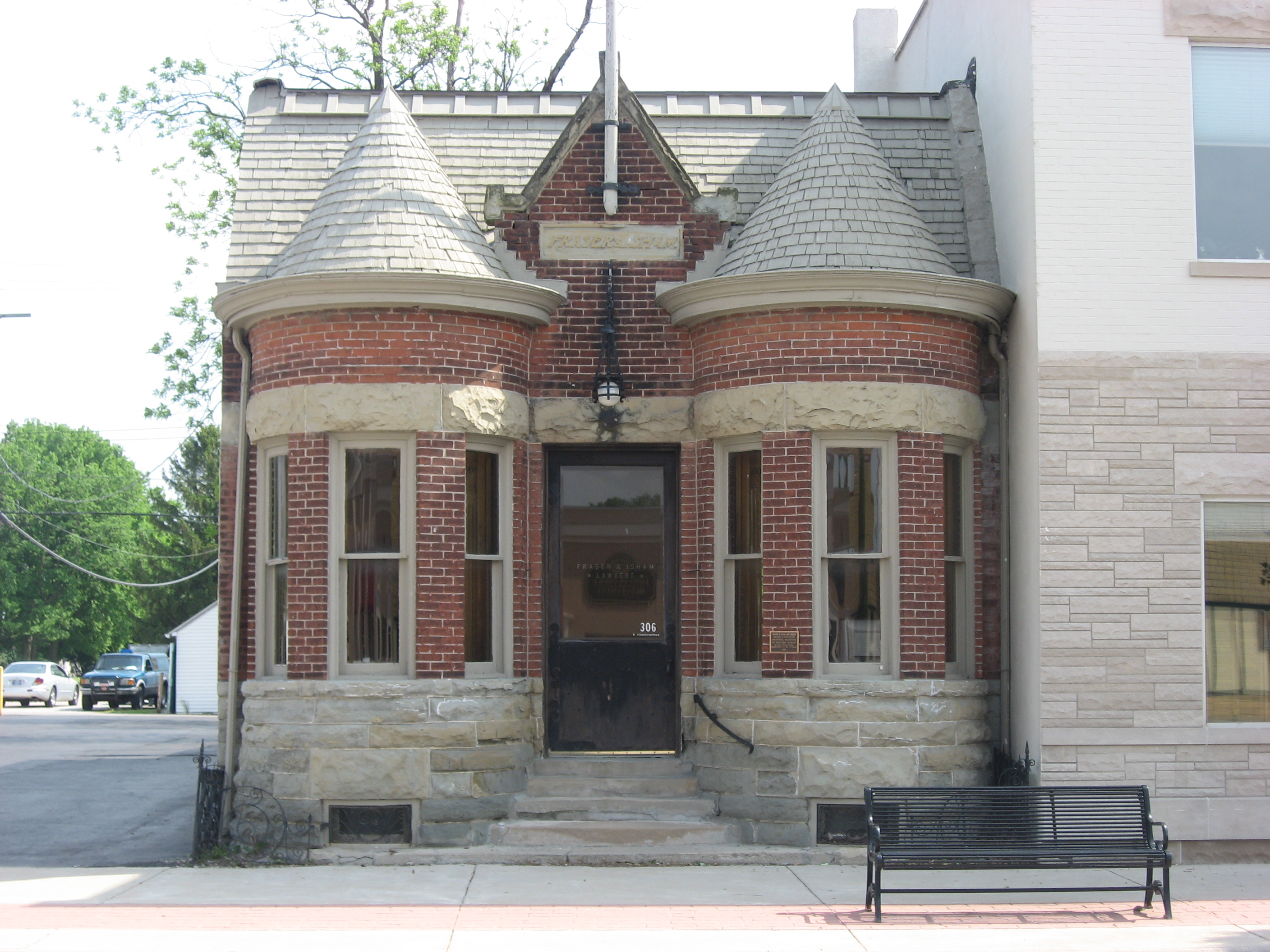
- Fraser & Isham Law Office, May 2011

- Location within Benton County, Indiana Location within Indiana Location within the United States
- Location: 306 E Fifth St., Fowler, Indiana
- Coordinates: 40°37′3″N 87°19′9″W
- Area: less than one acre
- Built: 1896, 1952
- Architect: Alexander, James F.
- Architectural style: Romanesque
- NRHP reference No.: 00001135
- Added to NRHP: September 22, 2000

Fraser & Isham Law Office, also known as Christopher Law Office, is a historic law office building located at Fowler, Indiana. It was built in 1896, and is a one-story, rectangular Romanesque Revival style red brick building. It features mansard and conical roofs and two rounded bays on the front facade. A flat roofed rear addition was erected in 1952.

It was listed on the National Register of Historic Places in 2000.
