= Benton County Courthouse (Indiana) =

- U.S. National Register of Historic Places
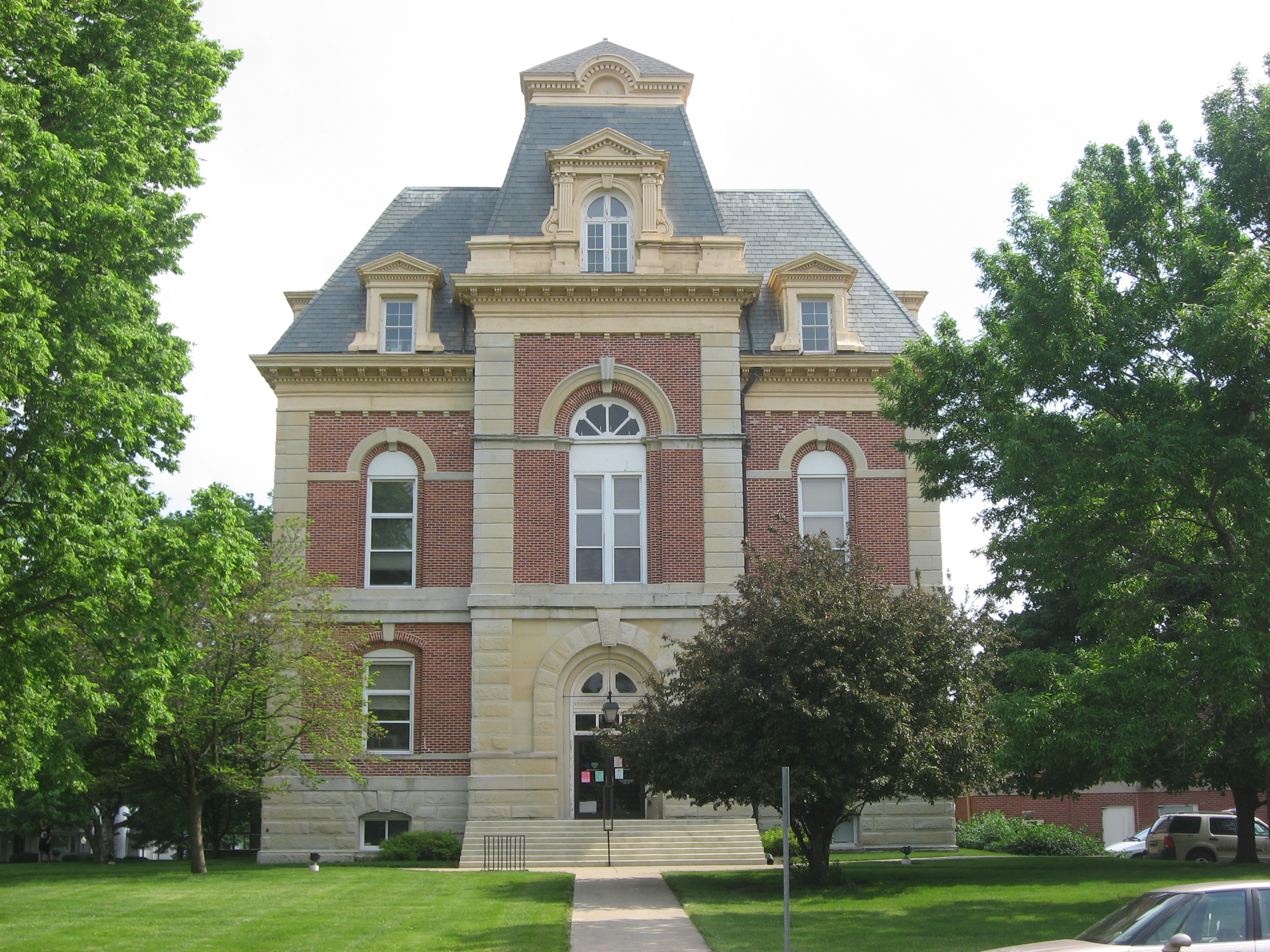

- Location within Benton County, Indiana Location within Indiana Location within the United States
- Location: 706 E. 5th St., Fowler, Indiana
- Coordinates: 40°37′2″N 87°18′57″W
- Built: 1874
- Architect: Randall, G.P.
- Architectural style: Second Empire
- NRHP reference No.: 08000741
- Added to NRHP: August 1, 2008

Benton County Courthouse is a Second Empire style building in Benton County, Indiana that was built in 1874.

It was nominated for listing on the National Register of Historic Places in 2008, and it was listed on the National Register on August 1 of that year.

There was a previous Benton County Courthouse that was built in 1855 but was torn down in 1873.

== History ==
Benton county was formed in 1840. After a long struggle, the seat was moved to Fowler in 1874.

The current Benton County Courthouse, located in Fowler, was designed by Gurdon P. Randall of Chicago and built in 1874 by Levi L. Leach at a cost of $62,257. The new courthouse was an impressive building from an architectural standpoint, but also provided much-needed improvements in security, including large fire-proof vaults. Randall had designed the Marshall County courthouse a few years earlier.
