= Fowler, Indiana =

- Town
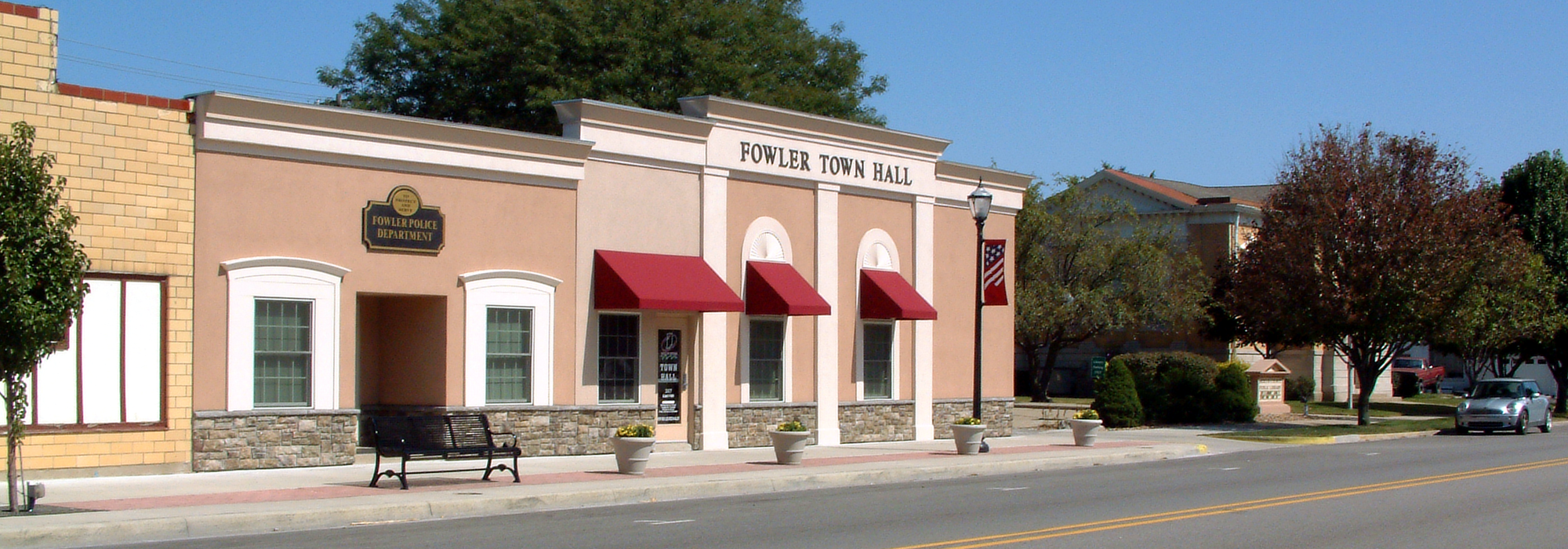
- Fowler's police department, town hall and public library

- Logo

- Location of Fowler in Benton County, Indiana.

- Map of Fowler

- Fowler's location in Benton County
- Coordinates: 40°37′6″N 87°19′9″W
- Country: United States
- State: Indiana
- County: Benton
- Township: Center
- Platted: 1872
- Incorporated: 1875
- Named after: The Fowler family

Area
  - Total: 1.42 sq mi (3.67 km^{2})
  - Land: 1.41 sq mi (3.66 km^{2})
  - Water: 0.0039 sq mi (0.01 km^{2})
- Elevation: 820 ft (250 m)

Population (2020)
  - Total: 2,337
  - Density: 1,654.8/sq mi (638.92/km^{2})
- Time zone: UTC-5 (EST)
  - Summer (DST): UTC-4 (EDT)
- ZIP codes: 47944, 47984, 47986
- Area code: 765
- FIPS code: 18-25180
- GNIS feature ID: 2396945
- Website: www.townoffowler.com

Fowler is a town in and the county seat of Center Township, Benton County, Indiana, United States. The population was 2,337 at the 2020 census. It is part of the Lafayette, Indiana metropolitan area.

== History ==
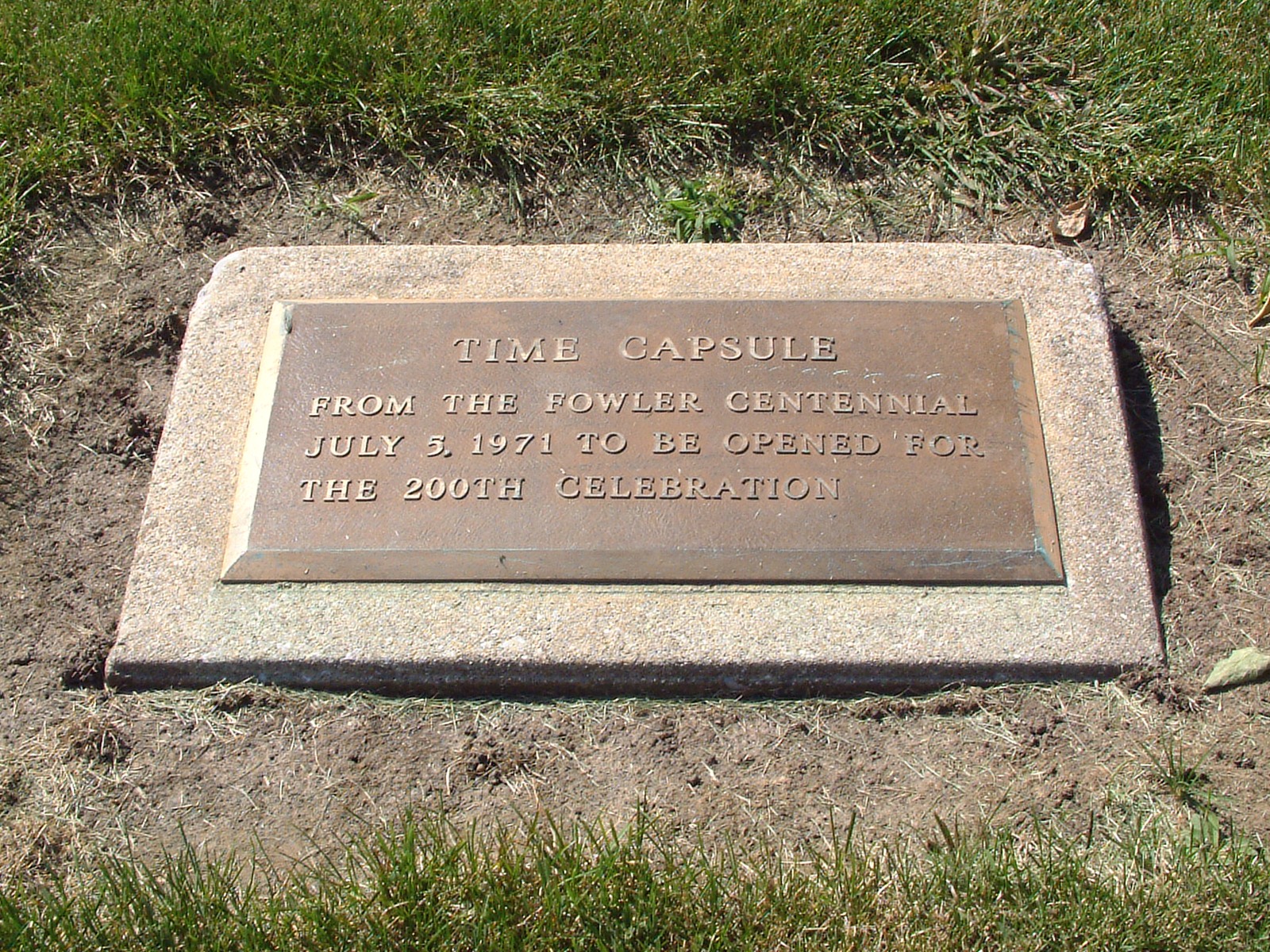
Time capsule near the courthouse

Fowler was platted by husband and wife Moses and Eliza Fowler on October 26, 1872, and originally consisted of 583 lots, though a re-platting on April 8, 1875, expanded it to 1,602 lots and 20 blocks. Several more additions were made to the town over subsequent years.

The town's first home was erected in March 1871 by Scott Shipman, and its first business opened in June of that year, a small general store run by Henry D. Clark. Many more businesses followed over the next few years, including the Henry Jacobs & Son grocery, grain elevators built by L. Templeton, and blacksmith John E. Mitchell, who was also the town's first postmaster (succeeded by grocer Henry Jacobs). In 1874, Fowler became the county seat, which until that time had occupied nearby Oxford.

The town was incorporated in 1875, and its rapid growth is clear from the following list, printed in an 1883 history of Benton County:

In September, 1875, the town of Fowler contained ten lawyers, one minister, three doctors, one dentist, one baker, two barber shops, three billiard saloons, two blacksmith shops, one wagon shop, three boot and shoe stores, one grain elevator, two dry goods stores, twenty carpenters, one furniture store, two stove and tin stores, one hardware store, one hotel, three restaurants, two drug stores, three millinery establishments, two saloons, two livery stables, three retail groceries, one clothing store, one merchant tailor, one graded school, two printing offices, two lumber yards, two churches and about 1,200 inhabitants.

Fowler is home to the Fowler Ridge Wind Farm.

The Benton County Courthouse, Fowler Theatre, and Fraser & Isham Law Office are listed on the National Register of Historic Places.

== Geography ==
Fowler is located in Center Township. U.S. Route 52 and State Roads 18 and 55 pass through town, and U.S. Route 41 intersects 52 four miles to the northwest.

According to the 2010 census, Fowler has a total area of 1.41 square miles (3.65 km^{2}), of which 1.4 square miles (3.63 km^{2}) (or 99.29%) is land and 0.01 square miles (0.03 km^{2}) (or 0.71%) is water.

== Demographics ==
Historical population
Census	Pop.	Note	%±
1880	967		—
1890	1,285		32.9%
1900	1,429		11.2%
1910	1,491		4.3%
1920	1,442		−3.3%
1930	1,564		8.5%
1940	1,903		21.7%
1950	2,117		11.2%
1960	2,491		17.7%
1970	2,643		6.1%
1980	2,319		−12.3%
1990	2,333		0.6%
2000	2,415		3.5%
2010	2,317		−4.1%
2020	2,337		0.9%
U.S. Decennial Census

=== 2020 census ===
As of the 2020 census, Fowler had a population of 2,337. The median age was 42.4 years. 23.4% of residents were under the age of 18 and 21.1% of residents were 65 years of age or older. For every 100 females there were 94.6 males, and for every 100 females age 18 and over there were 91.8 males age 18 and over.

0.0% of residents lived in urban areas, while 100.0% lived in rural areas.

There were 975 households in Fowler, of which 28.3% had children under the age of 18 living in them. Of all households, 39.8% were married-couple households, 20.5% were households with a male householder and no spouse or partner present, and 31.0% were households with a female householder and no spouse or partner present. About 33.8% of all households were made up of individuals and 17.8% had someone living alone who was 65 years of age or older.

There were 1,063 housing units, of which 8.3% were vacant. The homeowner vacancy rate was 2.9% and the rental vacancy rate was 6.6%.

Racial composition as of the 2020 census
Race	Number	Percent
White	2,173	93.0%
Black or African American	19	0.8%
American Indian and Alaska Native	6	0.3%
Asian	5	0.2%
Native Hawaiian and Other Pacific Islander	5	0.2%
Some other race	40	1.7%
Two or more races	89	3.8%
Hispanic or Latino (of any race)	73	3.1%

=== 2010 census ===
As of the census of 2010, there were 2,317 people, 935 households, and 593 families living in the town. The population density was 1,655.0 inhabitants per square mile (639.0/km^{2}). There were 1,062 housing units at an average density of 758.6 per square mile (292.9/km^{2}). The racial makeup of the town was 96.7% White, 0.6% African American, 0.1% Native American, 0.1% Asian, 0.9% from other races, and 1.6% from two or more races. Hispanic or Latino of any race were 3.9% of the population.

There were 935 households, of which 30.2% had children under the age of 18 living with them, 47.9% were married couples living together, 11.4% had a female householder with no husband present, 4.1% had a male householder with no wife present, and 36.6% were non-families. 33.5% of all households were made up of individuals, and 15.3% had someone living alone who was 65 years of age or older. The average household size was 2.40 and the average family size was 3.08.

The median age in the town was 41.8 years. 25.1% of residents were under the age of 18; 7.1% were between the ages of 18 and 24; 21.9% were from 25 to 44; 25.9% were from 45 to 64; and 20% were 65 years of age or older. The gender makeup of the town was 47.9% male and 52.1% female.

=== 2000 census ===
As of the census of 2000, there were 2,415 people, 948 households, and 623 families living in the town. The population density was 1,730.6 inhabitants per square mile (668.2/km^{2}). There were 1,020 housing units at an average density of 730.9 per square mile (282.2/km^{2}). The racial makeup of the town was 98.14% White, 0.29% African American, 0.08% Asian, 0.41% from other races, and 1.08% from two or more races. Hispanic or Latino of any race were 0.87% of the population.

There were 949 households, out of which 32.9% had children under the age of 18 living with them, 53.7% were married couples living together, 9.6% had a female householder with no husband present, and 34.2% were non-families. 30.9% of all households were made up of individuals, and 14.9% had someone living alone who was 65 years of age or older. The average household size was 2.43 and the average family size was 3.04.

In the town, the population was spread out, with 27.0% under the age of 18, 6.9% from 18 to 24, 27.0% from 25 to 44, 21.0% from 45 to 64, and 18.1% who were 65 years of age or older. The median age was 38 years. For every 100 females, there were 96.3 males. For every 100 females age 18 and over, there were 88.1 males.

The median income for a household in the town was $40,396, and the median income for a family was $50,586. Males had a median income of $29,889 versus $21,781 for females. The per capita income for the town was $17,881. About 4.5% of families and 5.8% of the population were below the poverty line, including 7.1% of those under age 18 and 2.7% of those age 65 or over.

== Education ==
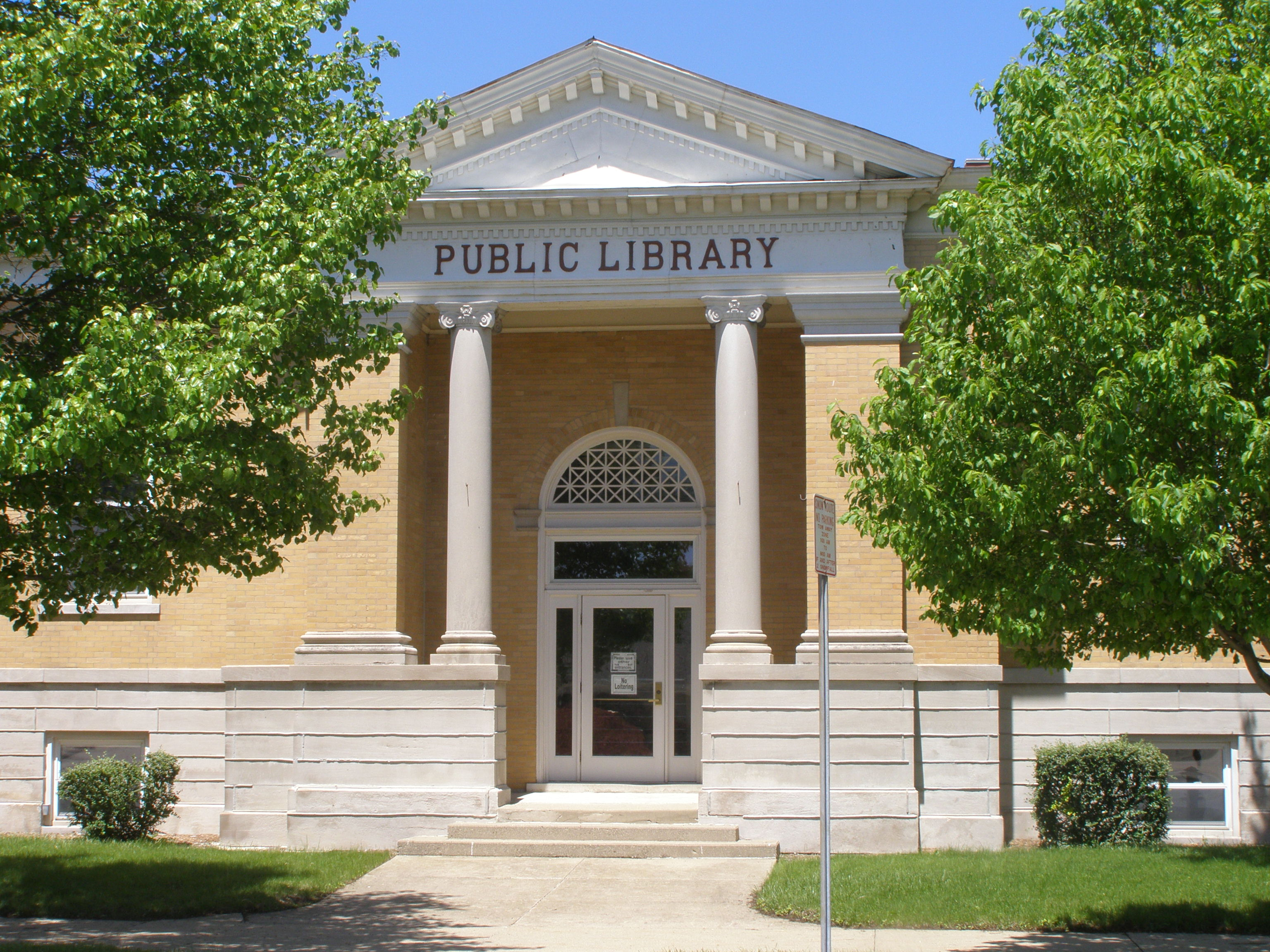
Benton County Public Library

It is in the Benton Community School Corporation. Its comprehensive high school is Benton Central Junior-Senior High School.

Prior to 2006 Fowler Elementary School operated, but that year it consolidated into Prairie Crossing Elementary School, which had opened.

The town has a lending library, the Benton County Public Library.

== Notable people ==
- Otis Johnson, baseball player
- Robert Keith, actor
