= Oxford, Indiana =

- Town
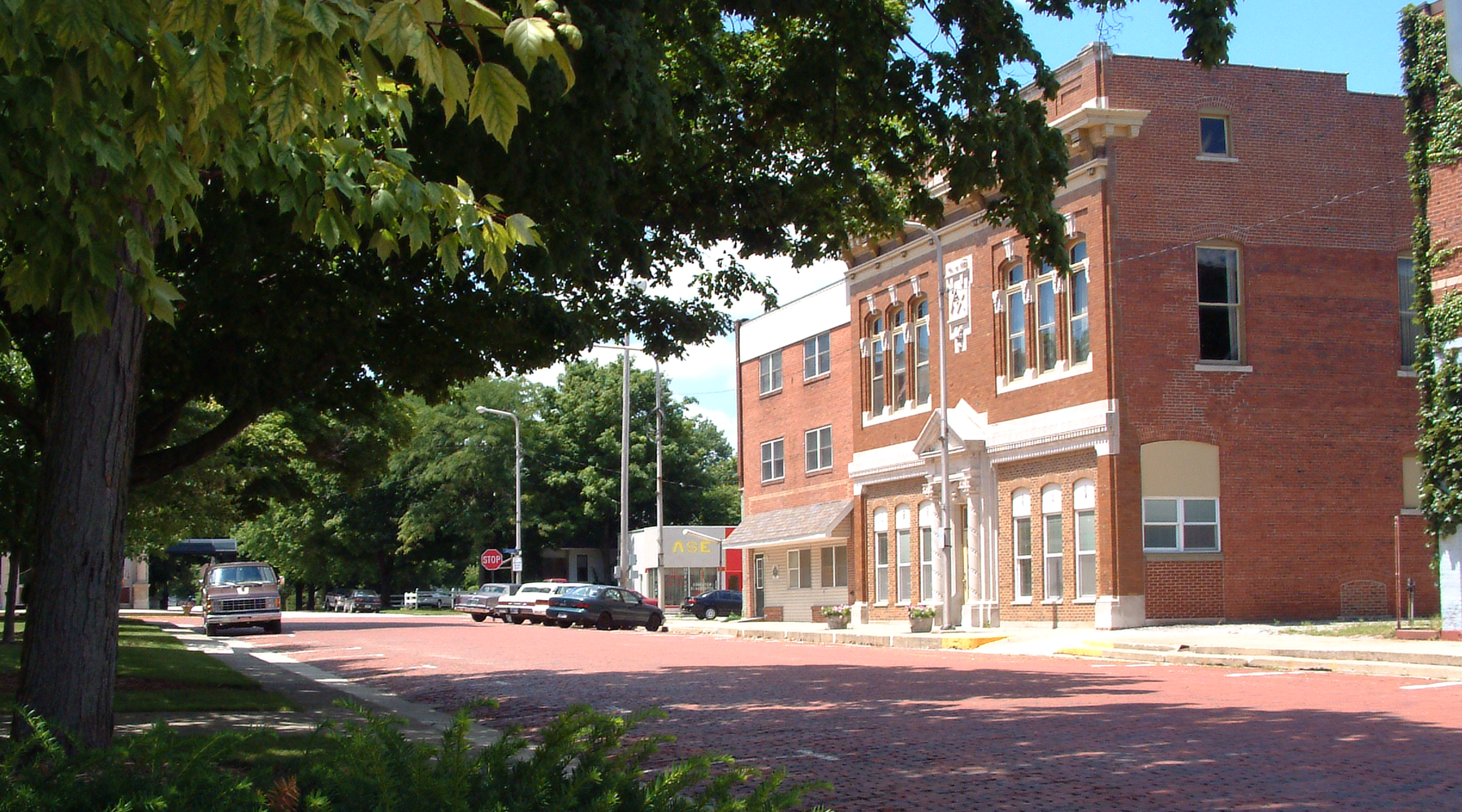
- East Smith Street on the town square with the historic 1915 Masonic building.

- Seal Logo

- Location of Oxford in Benton County, Indiana.

- Oxford's location in Benton County
- Coordinates: 40°31′17″N 87°14′59″W
- Country: United States
- State: Indiana
- County: Benton
- Township: Oak Grove
- Established: 1843
- Incorporated: 1869

Area
  - Total: 0.55 sq mi (1.42 km^{2})
  - Land: 0.55 sq mi (1.42 km^{2})
  - Water: 0 sq mi (0.00 km^{2}) 0%
- Elevation: 735 ft (224 m)

Population (2020)
  - Total: 1,165
  - Density: 2,127.5/sq mi (821.43/km^{2})
- Time zone: UTC-5 (EST)
  - Summer (DST): UTC-4 (EDT)
- ZIP code: 47971
- Area code: 765
- FIPS code: 18-57546
- GNIS feature ID: 2396844
- Website: oxford.in.gov

Oxford is a town in Oak Grove Township, Benton County, Indiana. The population was 1,165 at the 2020 census. It is part of the Lafayette, Indiana, Metropolitan Statistical Area.

== History ==
Oxford was Benton County's first town. Commissioners appointed by the Indiana General Assembly selected the location in May 1843 to be the site of the county seat on land donated by Henry W. Ellsworth and David Atkinson. It was first called Milroy in honor of Samuel Milroy, one of the commissioners, but a town in Rush County already bore that name. In October 1843 the commissioners changed it to Hartford, after Hartford, Connecticut (the home of Ellsworth and Watkins), but they discovered this name was also already being used in Indiana, so in December Judge David J. McConnell awarded the town its present name.

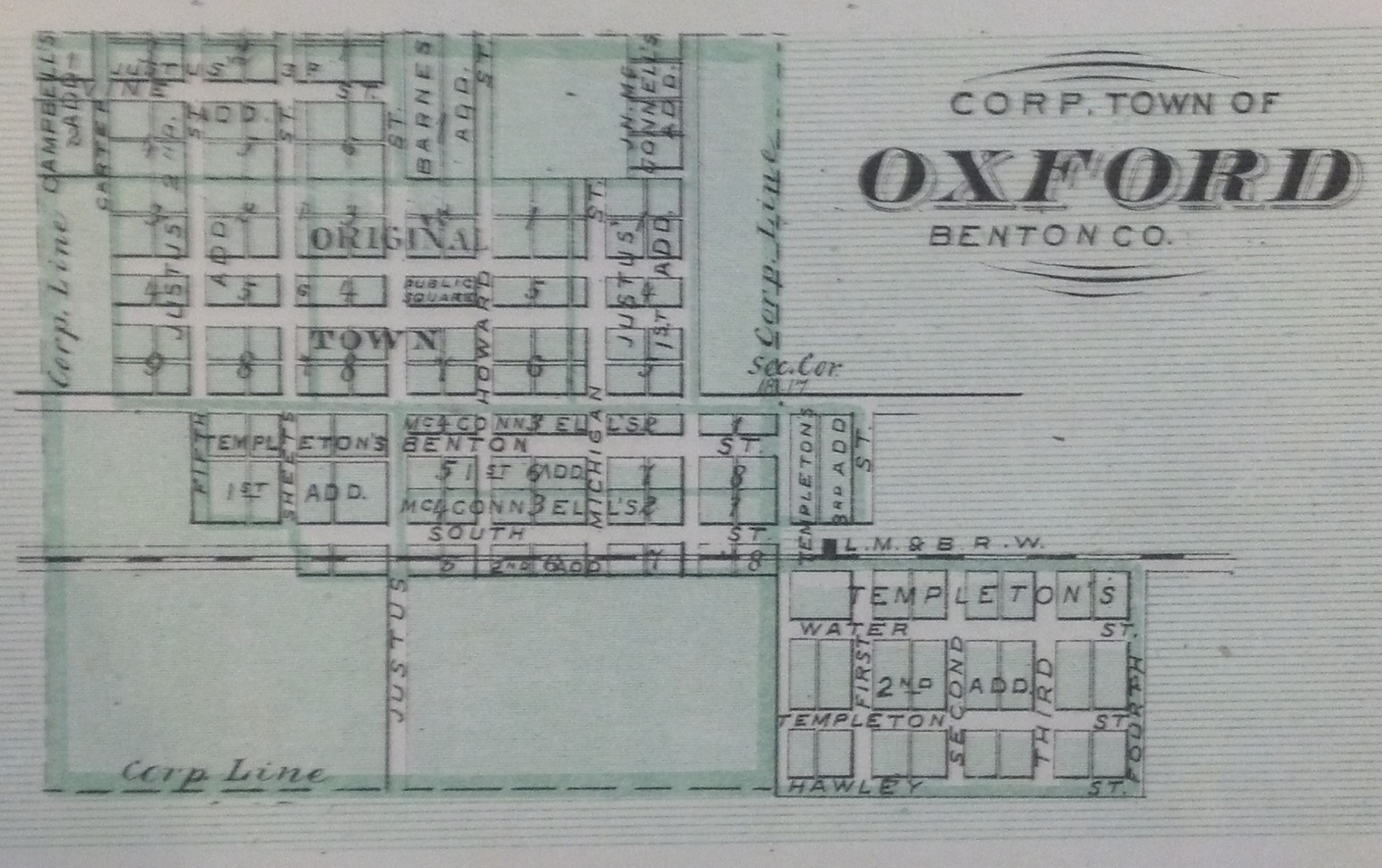
Map of Oxford from 1876 atlas

Lots went up for sale at this time, with buyers allowed to pay for the lots in three installments over 18 months. The first building erected in Oxford was a two-story, wooden frame courthouse, designed and built by Francis Boynton, and the second was a hotel, built by Henry L. Ellsworth and operated by James L. Hatton. The first home was that of Aaron Wood, who also ran a small store that supplied groceries, beer and whiskey.

Other early establishments in Oxford included the Earl & Carnahan dry goods store and Barnes & Dailey drug store. The town's first lawyer was Jacob Benedict and its first physician Dr. Mayo. An 1883 history also makes mention of the community's first literary society, the Oxford Lyceum.

Many additions and expansions to the town were made over subsequent decades, adding several streets and more than 300 lots. On July 7, 1869, a vote was held to determine if Oxford should be incorporated, and passed with 41 in favor and 28 against. The town was dealt a blow, however, when in 1874 it lost its status as county seat to more centrally located Fowler, 9 miles to the north.

Standardbred horse Dan Patch is arguably the town's best-known native, and was foaled in an Oxford barn on April 29, 1896. The horse gained celebrity status for setting world speed records that remained unbroken until 1960. A 1949 film, The Great Dan Patch, dramatized the horse's origins in Oxford and rise to fame. He continues to be honored at the town's annual Dan Patch Days festival.

The David S. Heath House and Presbyterian Church Building are listed on the National Register of Historic Places.

Additional significant historic properties include the Messner Building and the Masonic Building.

== Geography ==
Oxford is located in Oak Grove Township in the south part of the county. U.S. Route 52 passes within two miles of the town to the northeast; State Road 352 passes through the town and connects with US 52. State Road 55 also passes through downtown Oxford. The area occupied by the town is mostly open farmland that slopes gently southeast toward Big Pine Creek.

According to the 2010 census, Oxford has a total area of 0.54 square miles (1.40 km^{2}), all land.

== Demographics ==
Historical population
Census	Pop.	Note	%±
1860	318		—
1870	519		63.2%
1880	713		37.4%
1890	808		13.3%
1900	949		17.5%
1910	1,010		6.4%
1920	950		−5.9%
1930	853		−10.2%
1940	863		1.2%
1950	888		2.9%
1960	1,108		24.8%
1970	1,098		−0.9%
1980	1,327		20.9%
1990	1,273		−4.1%
2000	1,271		−0.2%
2010	1,162		−8.6%
2020	1,165		0.3%
U.S. Decennial Census

=== 2020 census ===
As of the 2020 census, Oxford had a population of 1,165. The median age was 37.4 years. 26.0% of residents were under the age of 18 and 15.5% of residents were 65 years of age or older. For every 100 females there were 98.8 males, and for every 100 females age 18 and over there were 91.6 males age 18 and over.

0.0% of residents lived in urban areas, while 100.0% lived in rural areas.

There were 463 households in Oxford, of which 32.8% had children under the age of 18 living in them. Of all households, 46.2% were married-couple households, 16.2% were households with a male householder and no spouse or partner present, and 27.9% were households with a female householder and no spouse or partner present. About 26.5% of all households were made up of individuals and 13.0% had someone living alone who was 65 years of age or older.

There were 524 housing units, of which 11.6% were vacant. The homeowner vacancy rate was 3.7% and the rental vacancy rate was 10.9%.

Racial composition as of the 2020 census
Race	Number	Percent
White	1,088	93.4%
Black or African American	11	0.9%
American Indian and Alaska Native	2	0.2%
Asian	0	0.0%
Native Hawaiian and Other Pacific Islander	0	0.0%
Some other race	9	0.8%
Two or more races	55	4.7%
Hispanic or Latino (of any race)	39	3.3%

=== 2010 census ===
As of the census of 2010, there were 1,162 people, 479 households, and 306 families residing in the town. The population density was 2,151.9 inhabitants per square mile (830.9/km^{2}). There were 535 housing units at an average density of 990.7 per square mile (382.5/km^{2}). The racial makeup of the town was 98.4% White, 0.1% African American, 0.5% Native American, 0.1% Asian, 0.3% from other races, and 0.6% from two or more races. Hispanic or Latino of any race were 0.7% of the population.

There were 479 households, of which 32.6% had children under the age of 18 living with them, 47.8% were married couples living together, 10.4% had a female householder with no husband present, 5.6% had a male householder with no wife present, and 36.1% were non-families. 30.7% of all households were made up of individuals, and 15.1% had someone living alone who was 65 years of age or older. The average household size was 2.43 and the average family size was 3.04.

The median age in the town was 39.6 years. 25% of residents were under the age of 18; 8.1% were between the ages of 18 and 24; 23.8% were from 25 to 44; 27.5% were from 45 to 64; and 15.6% were 65 years of age or older. The gender makeup of the town was 48.8% male and 51.2% female.

=== 2000 census ===
As of the census of 2000, there were 1,271 people, 485 households, and 337 families residing in the town. The population density was 2,476.0 inhabitants per square mile (956.0/km^{2}). There were 514 housing units at an average density of 1,001.3 per square mile (386.6/km^{2}). The racial makeup of the town was 97.88% White, 0.16% African American, 0.08% Native American, 0.08% Asian, 0.71% from other races, and 1.10% from two or more races. Hispanic or Latino of any race were 1.02% of the population.

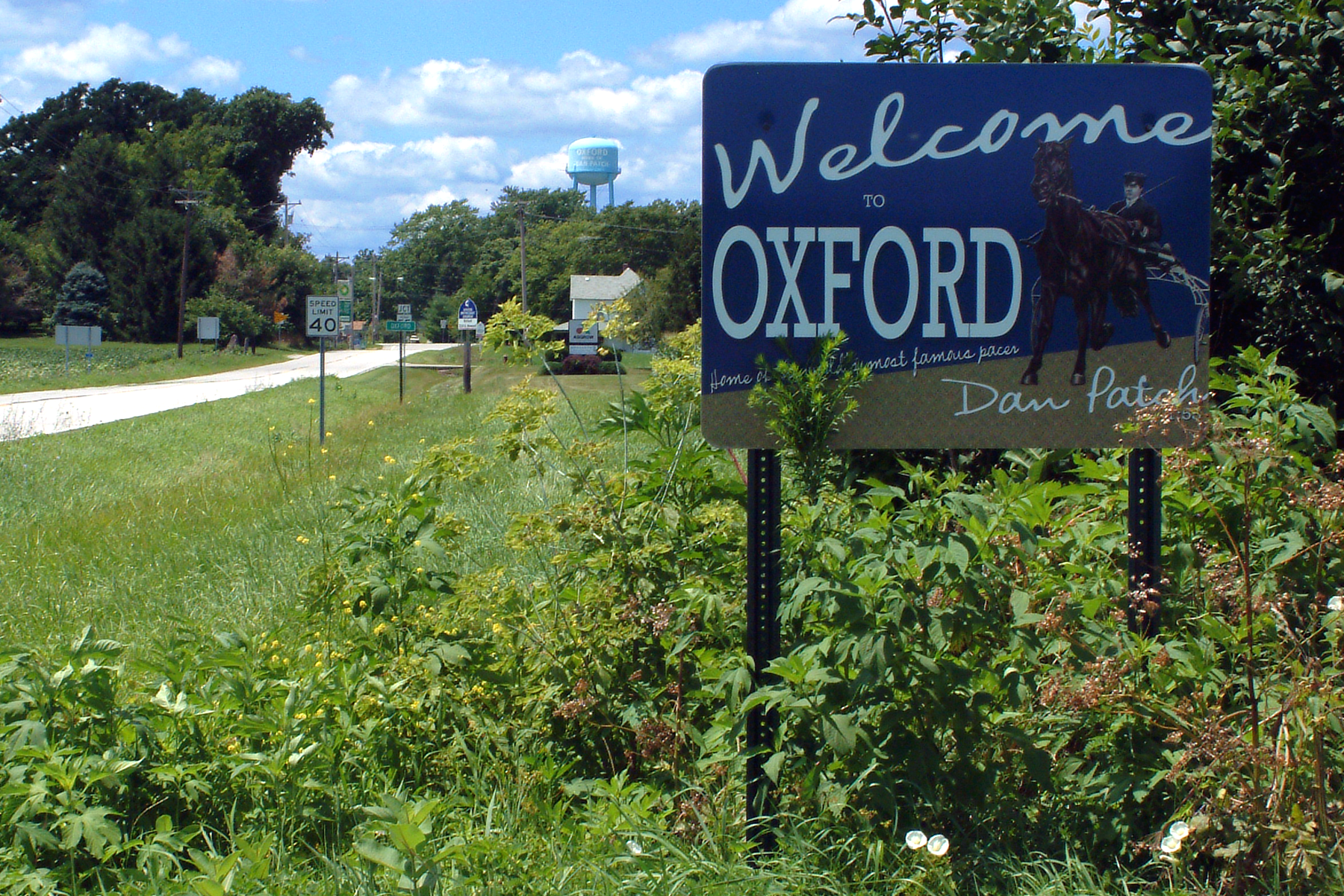
A sign welcomes visitors.

There were 485 households, out of which 34.6% had children under the age of 18 living with them, 53.2% were married couples living together, 10.9% had a female householder with no husband present, and 30.5% were non-families. 24.9% of all households were made up of individuals, and 15.1% had someone living alone who was 65 years of age or older. The average household size was 2.54 and the average family size was 3.01.

In the town, the population was spread out, with 26.8% under the age of 18, 7.1% from 18 to 24, 28.5% from 25 to 44, 22.0% from 45 to 64, and 15.6% who were 65 years of age or older. The median age was 38 years. For every 100 females, there were 96.4 males. For every 100 females age 18 and over, there were 85.3 males.

The median income for a household in the town was $39,375, and the median income for a family was $45,966. Males had a median income of $31,714 versus $21,630 for females. The per capita income for the town was $16,472. About 2.1% of families and 5.1% of the population were below the poverty line, including 2.8% of those under age 18 and 11.0% of those age 65 or over.

== Education ==
It is in the Benton Community School Corporation. Its comprehensive high school is Benton Central Jr. Sr. High School. Located directly beside Benton Central is Prairie Crossing Elementary School, where students attend grades K–6 and then move to Benton Central Jr. Sr. High School for grades 7–12.

Prior to 2006 Oxford Elementary School operated, but that year it consolidated into Prairie Crossing elementary, which had opened.

The town has a lending library, the Oxford Public Library.

== Media ==
Oxford is home to Benton County's only radio station. Located at 98.1 MHz, WIBN broadcasts from studios located in downtown Oxford.

== Notable people ==
- Richard Bartindale, founder of Bart's Books
- Winnie Ruth Judd, convicted murderer
