= Hoosier Wind Farm =

Wind farm in Indiana, USA

- Country: United States
- Location: Fowler, Indiana
- Coordinates: 40°36′0″N 87°19′12″W
- Status: Operational
- Commission date: October 2009
- Owners: IPL, enXco

Wind farm
- Type: Onshore

Power generation
- Units operational: 53 REpower wind turbines, @2 MW
- Nameplate capacity: 106 MW

Hoosier Wind Farm is a wind farm in Benton County, Indiana. It consists of 53 REpower 2 MW wind turbines, for a total nameplate capacity of 106 MW. The enXco subsidiary of EDF Energies Nouvelles built the wind farm, with Mortenson Construction's Renewable Energy Group as the subcontractor. Indianapolis Power & Light (IPL) has a 20-year contract to purchase and distribute the wind farm's output.

== History ==
IPL and enXco announced their plan to build the wind farm in April, 2008. The original plan called for 67 GE 1.5 MW wind turbines. By the time construction started in April 2009, the plan had changed to use REpower 2.0 MW wind turbines instead, with 80m towers. At the time of construction, Hoosier was only the third wind farm in the United States to use REpower wind turbines, after Goodnoe Hills Wind Farm in Goldendale, Washington, and Shiloh Wind Farm Phase II in Birds Landing, California (also constructed by enXco and Mortenson). Construction took six months.

The groundbreaking ceremony on April 17, 2009, included Indiana Lt. Governor Becky Skillman and other government and industry officials.

== Environmental impact ==
IPL expects Hoosier to generate enough power for 29,000 homes and reduce carbon dioxide emissions by 348,000 tons per year. This is equivalent to the annual emissions from 58,000 cars.

== See also ==
- Benton County Wind Farm
- Fowler Ridge Wind Farm
- Meadow Lake Wind Farm
- Wind power in Indiana
