= Wind power in Indiana =

Electricity from wind in one U.S. state

Wind power projects in Indiana
Operating
Under construction
Stand-alone facilities

Wind power in Indiana was limited to a few small water-pumping windmills on farms until 2008 with construction of Indiana's first utility-scale wind power facility, Goodland (phase I) with a nameplate capacity of 130 MW. As of March 2024, Indiana had a total of 2,743 MW of wind power capacity installed, ranking it 12th among U.S. states. Wind power was responsible for 4.8% of in-state electricity production in 2016.

The main utility-scale development up to 2016 had been in the northwest part of the state in Benton, White, and Jasper counties. As of May 2017, Fowler Ridge Wind Farm was completed and has a final nameplate capacity of 750 MW, making it the Midwest's largest wind farm, and one of the largest in the world. Wind energy growth in Indiana continues, with 15 projects currently online, continually increasing the total installed capacity of the state.

== Installed capacity and wind resources ==
The following table compares the growth in wind power installed nameplate capacity in MW for Indiana and the entire United States from 2007 through 2019.

Year	Indiana	US
2007	0	16,907
2008	130.5	25,410
2009	1,036	34,863
2010	1,339.2	40,267
2011	1,340	46,916
2012	1,543	60,005
2013	1,544	61,107
2014	1,745	65,880
2015	1,895	74,471
2016	1,895	82,171
2017	2,117	89,078
2018	2,317	96,487
2019	2,317	105,583
2020	2,968	122,478

Installed capacity by state as of 2018 (animated map of installed capacity growth)

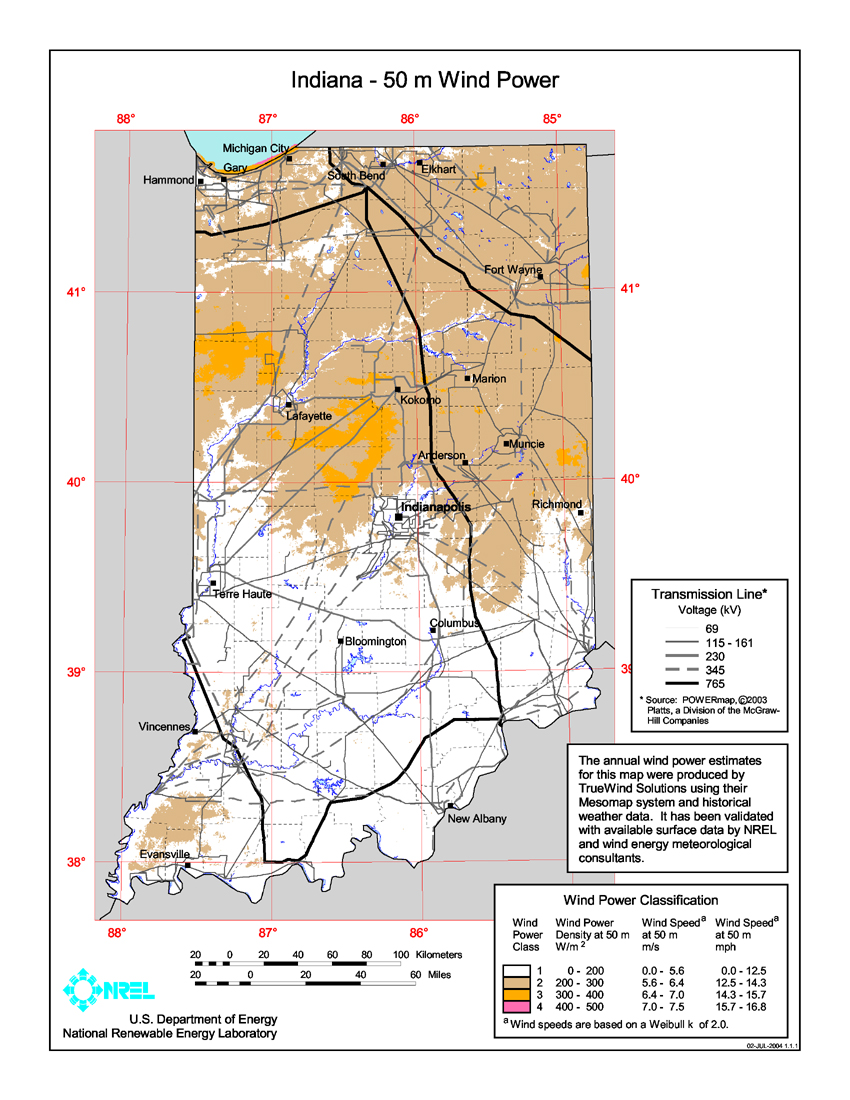
Average annual wind power density map for Indiana at 50m above ground

As of 2017, the state of Indiana ranks 12th in installed wind capacity and number of wind turbines with 1,897 MW and 1,096 turbines, respectively. Together, these yield 4.82% of the total in-state electricity production (~4,368,000 MWh or enough to power ~453,000 homes). To put this number into perspective, Indiana consumed 104.514 TWh of electricity in 2015. However, the National Renewable Energy Laboratory predicts wind energy growth in Indiana, stating the wind potential (from turbines with an 80 m hub height) could reach levels upwards of 40,259 MW by 2030. This predicted potential growth is starting to materialize, with 15 wind projects currently online in the state.

Indiana also has some offshore wind resources in the shallows of Lake Michigan along its shoreline. However, offshore wind power development is far behind onshore development in the United States generally, because onshore development is cheaper and the United States has an abundance of suitable onshore sites to develop. As of 2026, Indiana has no offshore wind farms.

== Wind generation ==
Indiana wind generation in 2015

Indiana wind generation (GWh, million kWh)
Year	Total	Jan	Feb	Mar	Apr	May	Jun	Jul	Aug	Sep	Oct	Nov	Dec
2008	239					26	27	18	14	17	37	43	57
2009	1,404	49	109	133	161	94	69	43	64	45	145	220	272
2010	2,935	271	187	225	316	221	157	119	91	246	342	396	364
2011	3,286	315	390	377	429	270	203	82	83	164	246	432	295
2012	3,211	416	307	374	386	212	184	113	94	162	328	242	394
2013	3,481	450	276	334	396	303	184	138	92	155	297	449	405
2014	3,495	415	252	323	388	304	190	167	101	158	325	507	366
2015	4,516	411	413	424	425	365	272	176	165	214	517	554	580
2016	4,898	656	572	510	451	402	279	164	148	241	460	477	538
2017	5,090	476	484	521	515	429	349	179	171	228	523	587	628
2018	5,438	768	512	617	465	423	276	223	260	272	518	508	596
2019	6,217	663	594	649	712	498	427	260	232	346	562	545	729
2020	6,287	632	596	651	633	505	366	194	162	357	581	800	810
2021	7,899	661	722	894	723	588	576	350	360	660	621	807	937
2022	9,767	956	1,023	1,037	1,012	854	554	469	416	504	909	1,054	979
2023	2,976	905	969	1,102									

Teal background indicates the largest wind generation month for the year.

Green background indicates the largest wind generation month to date.

As this graph indicates, Indiana generally tends to have more steady wind from fall to spring months, evidenced by the fact that even in southern Indiana, wind chill is a common factor of outside conditions. October and November, for example, often see large variances in temperature, causing more days of strong gusty winds, thereby generating more wind electricity production. The same happens in March and April. However, often in the summer months, the air tends to stagnate, resulting in less wind electricity production.

== Wind farms ==
The following table of wind farms and utility-scale wind power developments uses data from the AWEA, the State of Indiana, and other sources. For the larger projects constructed in phases, the table lists separate information for each phase. The name of each wind farm is the one used by the energy company when referring to it. The "wind farm" suffix is implied and hence removed for brevity. For more details and references for each wind farm, see its article.

Wind farm	County(s)	Coordinates	Turbine model	Power per turbine (MW)	No. of turbines	Total nameplate capacity (MW)	Online	Developer	Operator	Power purchaser
Benton County phase I	Benton	40.686°N 87.408°W	GE sl/sle Gen4	1.5	87	130.5	2008-04	Orion Energy	Orion Energy	Duke, Vectren
Black River	Gibson, Posey				65	(proposed)				
Fowler Ridge phase I Vestas	Benton	40.608°N 87.320°W	Vestas V82	1.65	182	300.3	2009-04	BP, Dominion	BP, Dominion	AEP, Dominion
Fowler Ridge phase I Clipper	Benton	40.608°N 87.320°W	Clipper 2.5	2.5	40	100	2009-04	BP, Dominion	BP, Dominion	AEP, Dominion
Fowler Ridge phase II	Benton	40.608°N 87.320°W	GE sl/sle Gen4	1.5	133	199.5	2009-12	BP, Dominion	BP, Dominion	AEP, Vectren
Headwaters	Randolph		Vestas V110	2	100	200	2014-12	EDP Renewables North America	EDP Renewables North America	Indiana Michigan Power
Headwaters II	Randolph		13 x Vestas 136 36 x Vestas 150	3.6/4.2	49	198	2021	EDP Renewables North America	EDP Renewables North America	
Hoosier	Benton	40.6°N 87.32°W	REpower	2	53	106	2009-08	IPL, enXco	IPL, enXco	IPL
Indiana Crossroads I	White		Vestas V150	4.2	72	302.4	2021-12	EDP Renewables North America, NIPSCO	EDP Renewables North America, NIPSCO	
Indiana Crossroads II	White		Nordex N155	4.8	42	201.6	2023-12	EDP Renewables North America, NIPSCO	EDP Renewables North America, NIPSCO	
Jordan Creek	Benton, Warren		GE 2.3, 2.52, 2.6, 2.82	2.3, 2.52, 2.6, 2.82	146	398.68	2020-12	NextEra	NextEra	NIPSCO
Meadow Lake phase I	White	40.601°N 86.865°W	Vestas V82	1.65	121	199.65	2009-10	Horizon Wind Energy	EDP Renewables North America	AEP, wholesale market
Meadow Lake phase II	White	40.601°N 86.865°W	Acciona	1.5	66	99	2010-06	Horizon Wind Energy	EDP Renewables North America	
Meadow Lake phase III	White	40.601°N 86.865°W	GE	1.5	69	103.5	2010-10	Horizon Wind Energy	EDP Renewables North America	
Meadow Lake phase IV	White	40.601°N 86.865°W	Suzlon	2.1	47	98.7	2010-10	Horizon Wind Energy	EDP Renewables North America	
Prairie Breeze	Tipton	40.361°N 86.152°W		1.6	94	(cancelled)		Juwi		
Rosewater	White		VestasV136 and V150	3.6 and 4.2	25	102	2020-11	NiSource	EDP Renewables North America/NIPSCO	NIPSCO
Union City/Randolph Eastern School Corporation	Randolph	40.201°N 84.815°W	Nordic Windpower	1	2	2	2010-02	Performance Services	Union City, Randolph Eastern School Corporation	AEP
Wildcat phase I	Madison, Tipton	40.352°N 85.882°W	GE	1.6	125	200	2012-10	E.ON	E.ON	AEP
Wildcat phase II	Grant, Howard	40.480°N 85.860°W			40–60	(proposed)		E.ON		
Wildcat phase III	Tipton				40–75	(proposed)		E.ON		
Wildcat phase IV	Tipton					(proposed)		E.ON		

== Single-unit turbines ==
In addition to the above wind farms, single stand-alone units have also been built in multiple other locations, mostly at schools. Some of these units were placed to test the environment for future wind energy development.

Location	County	Owner	Wind speed (m/s)	Power (Kw)
Akron	Kosciusko	Tippecanoe Valley School Corporation	6.5 m/s (14.5 mph)	900
Middletown	Henry	Shenandoah School Corporation		900
Carthage	Shelby		7.7 / 99m	
Haubstadt	Gibson	South Gibson School Corporation	6.1 / 99m	
Kokomo	Howard	Northwestern School Corporation	7.0 / 99m	
LaGrange	LaGrange		7.0 / 99m	
Francesville	Pulaski	West Central School Corporation	6.9	900

== Environmental impact ==
According to the USDOE, each 1000 MW of wind power capacity installed in Indiana will annually save 1,684 million gallons of water and eliminate 3.1 million tons of carbon dioxide emissions.

For comparison, Indiana emitted a total of 1,883 lbs/MWh of carbon dioxide in 2015.

As of March 2010 Indiana lacked a renewable energy standard, unlike several other midwestern states: Ohio, Illinois, Michigan, Minnesota, Missouri and Iowa. Nevertheless, Indiana's wind power development had outpaced that of Ohio and Michigan.

== Government policies and initiatives ==
The Indiana State government, along with the Federal Government, has put many incentives in place for the use of wind energy. The three main categories of incentives are utility, state, and federal.

=== Utility ===
Utility incentives target customers who have their own small wind energy systems. These incentives consist of net metering and feed-in tariff (FIT) incentives. Net metering allows the utility company to track the energy the wind system produces, and customers can then use that energy as a credit on their bills. The FIT program, only adopted by the utility company Northern Indiana Public Service Company (NIPSCO), pays their customers per kWh of energy produced by their wind turbine, as opposed to offering a credit. Currently NIPSCO mandates a rate of $0.17/kWh for systems less than or equal to 100 kW and $0.10/kWh for systems 100 kW to 2 MW.

=== State ===
State-level incentives consist of the Renewable Energy Property Tax Exemption and Indiana Sales Tax Incentive for Electrical Generating Equipment. The renewable energy exemption states that the assessed value of any wind system installed after December 31, 2011, is eligible for property tax exemption pending the completion of state form 18865. The sales tax incentive states that the equipment used to produce renewable electricity are eligible for a sales tax exemption. The state of Indiana also implemented a voluntary Clean Energy Portfolio Standard (CPS) in May 2011. The CPS set a goal for the state to have 10% of its electric generation come from clean energy by 2025.

=== Federal ===
Federal incentives include the Rural Energy for America Program (REAP), Business Energy Investment Tax Credit, and the Residential Renewable Energy Tax Credit. The REAP program provides grants to agricultural producers and rural businesses for projects that yield more energy efficiency and renewable energy. The Business Energy Tax Credit, as of September 18, 2017, is only available to large wind turbines (greater than 100 kW in capacity) and was set to expire on December 31, 2019. The credit is currently at a rate of 24% of invested expenditures with no credit cap. The Residential Renewable Energy Tax Credit is similar to the Business Investment credit except only small turbines qualify (cannot exceed 100 kW). As of September 18, 2017, the tax credit was at 30% with no max. This credit was also set to expire on December 31, 2019.

== See also ==
- Solar power in Indiana
- Index of Indiana-related articles
- Wind power in the United States
- Renewable energy in the United States
- Outline of Indiana
