= Smithson, Indiana =

- Unincorporated community
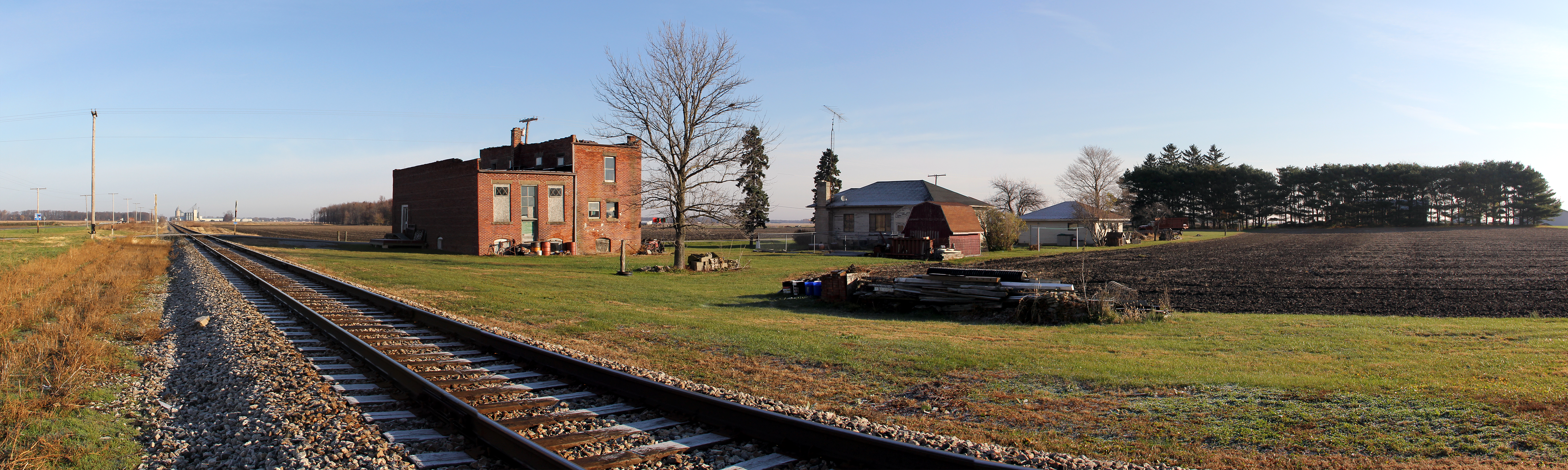

- Location within Indiana Location within the United States
- Coordinates: 40°43′04″N 86°52′21″W
- Country: United States
- State: Indiana
- County: White
- Township: Big Creek
- Elevation: 692 ft (211 m)
- Time zone: UTC-5 (Eastern (EST))
  - Summer (DST): UTC-4 (EDT)
- ZIP code: 47980
- GNIS feature ID: 443708

Smithson is an unincorporated community in Big Creek Township, White County, in the U.S. state of Indiana.

== History ==
Smithson was originally called Wheeler, and was laid out under that name on the farm of Hiram M. Wheeler when the Louisville, New Albany and Chicago Railway was extended to that point. The present name is derived from Bernard G. Smith, a Civil War veteran and early settler. Smithson was the name of the local post office which was established in 1880 and remained in operation until it was discontinued in 1931.

== Geography ==
Smithson is located at 40°43′04″N 86°52′21″W, approximately two miles south of Reynolds at the intersection of State Road 43 and Smithson Road.
