= Solar power in Louisiana =

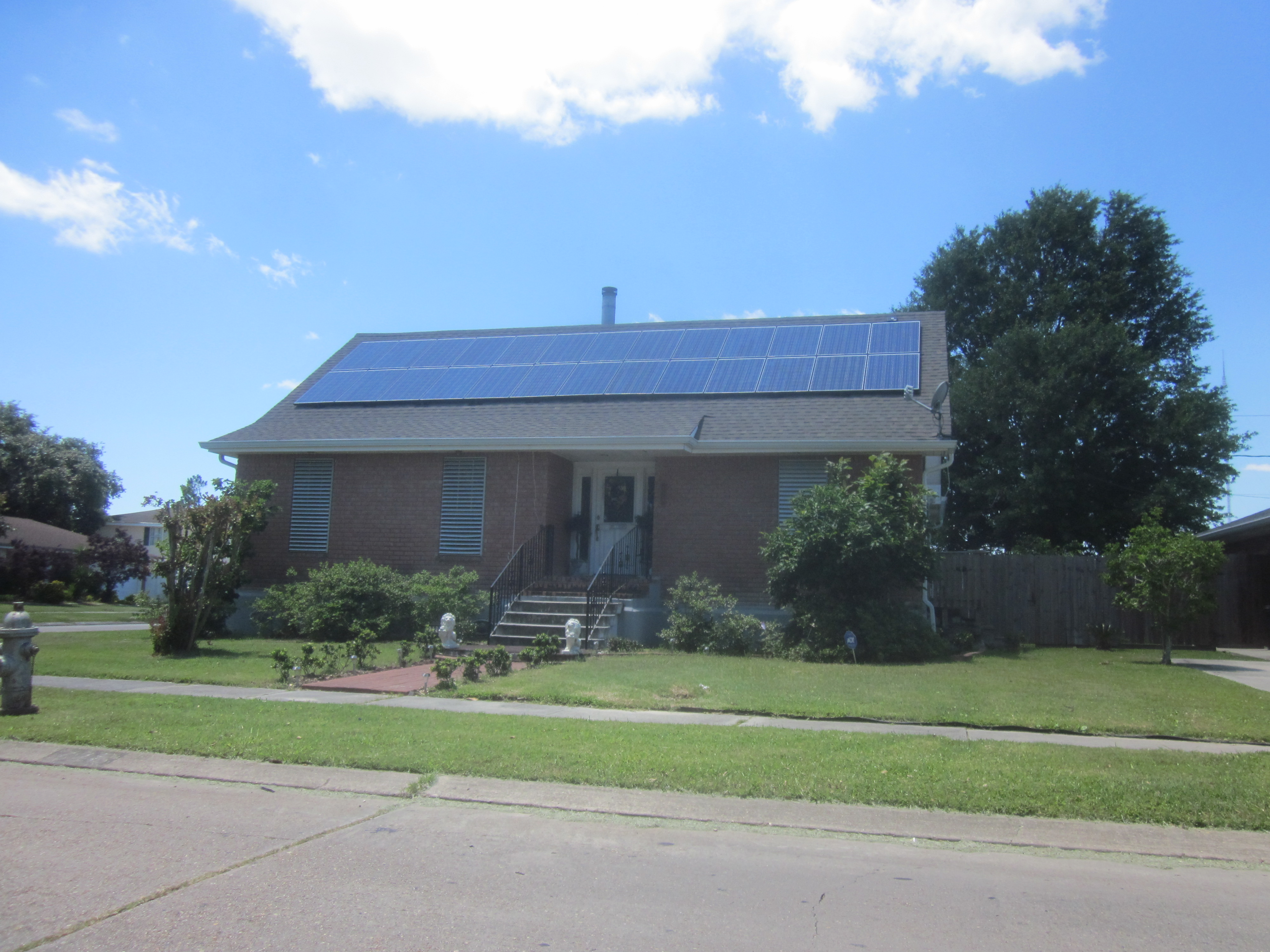
Solar panels on a house in Terrytown

Solar power in Louisiana is ranked 34th for installed solar PV capacity as of 2017 by the Solar Energy Industry Association. The state's "solar friendliness" according to Solar Power Rocks has fallen to 50th place for 2018 as the state credit program ends and full 1:1 retail net metering is being phased out. Taxpayers still benefit from federal incentive programs such as the 30 percent tax credit, which applies to business and residential solar photovoltaic and thermal energy systems of any size.

From January 1, 2008 to June 19, 2015, Louisiana offered a 50 percent tax credit up to $12,500 for the installation of solar system for purchased systems. On a combined basis with federal tax credits, and depending on a homeowner's tax situation, this amounted to an 80 percent tax credit for solar installations less than $25,000 in value, as well as a smaller credit for leased solar systems, which increased the affordability of solar PV and water heating.

Google's Project Sunroof estimates Louisiana to have over 20GW of rooftop solar potential; New Orleans is estimated to have over 90% of its roofs capable of solar energy production.

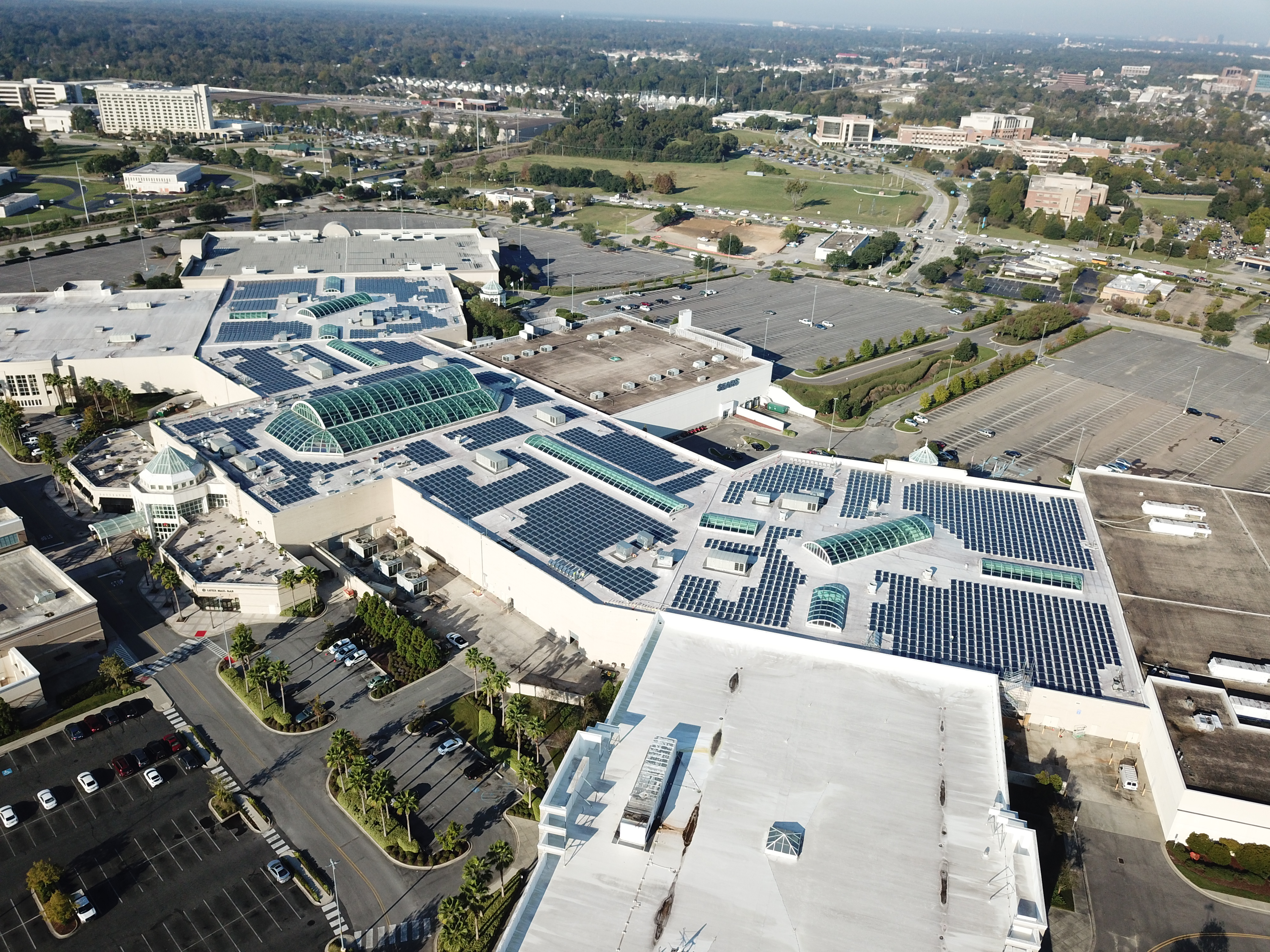
Solar panels on the Mall of Louisiana

New Orleans' largest solar array is the 1MW array installed by Blattner Energy at the Entergy Patterson facility in New Orleans East. The largest solar project in the state of Louisiana as of 2018 was the 1.2MW rooftop solar system at the Mall of Louisiana, completed in 2017 by Solar Alternatives and Strata Solar.

A planned 345 MW project in Pointe Coupée Parish will more than double the solar power capacity in the state.

== Statistics ==
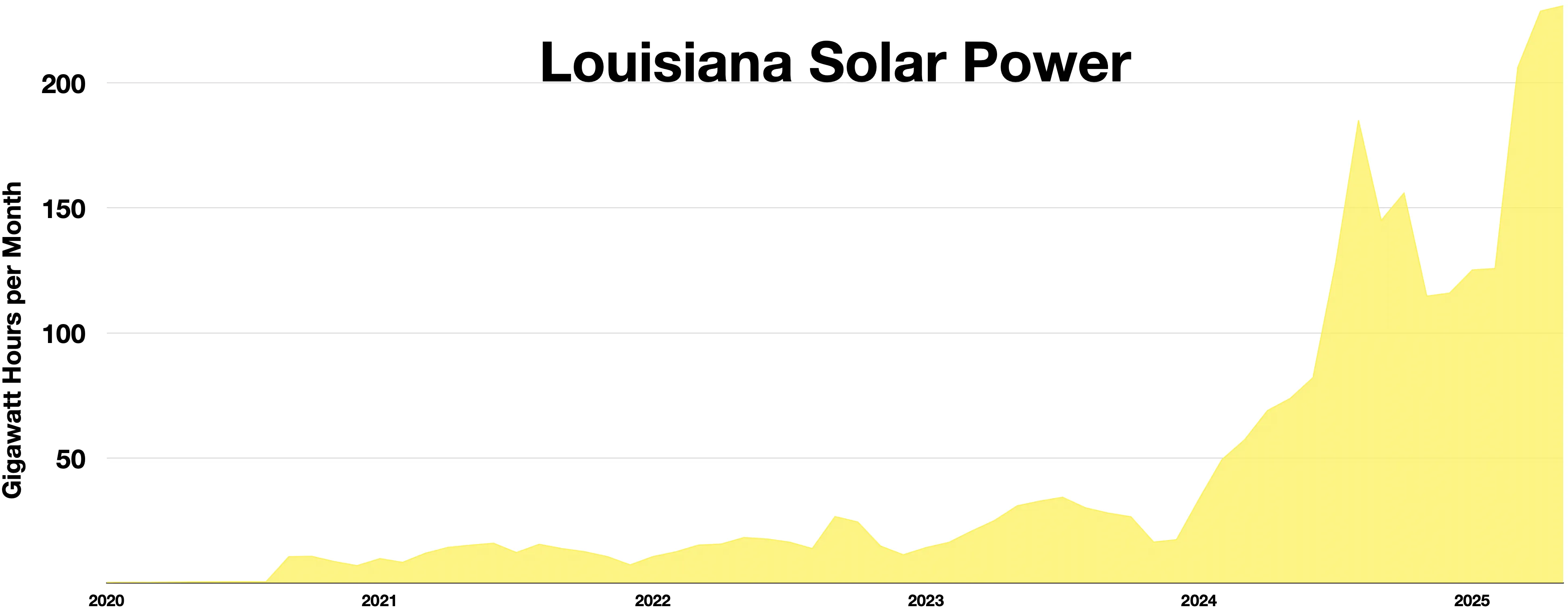
Louisiana solar power from 2020 to 2025

Source: NREL

Grid-connected PV capacity (MW)
Year	Total	Installed
2009	0.2	
2010	2.6	2.4
2011	13.4	10.8
2012	18.2	4.8
2013	46.6	28.4
2014	60	13.4
2015	92	32
2016	110	18
2017	120	10
2018	138	18
2019	146	8
2020	188.5	42.5
2021	202.9	14.4
2022	276	73.1

Note: Source gives conflicting information for 2011 and 2012.

Utility-scale solar generation in Louisiana (GWh)
Year	Total	Jan	Feb	Mar	Apr	May	Jun	Jul	Aug	Sep	Oct	Nov	Dec
2020	37	0	0	0	0	0	0	0	0	10	11	9	7
2021	118	10	10	14	17	18	18	14	17				

== See also ==
- Solar power in the United States
- Renewable energy in the United States
