= Meadow Lake Wind Farm =

Wind farm in Indiana, United States

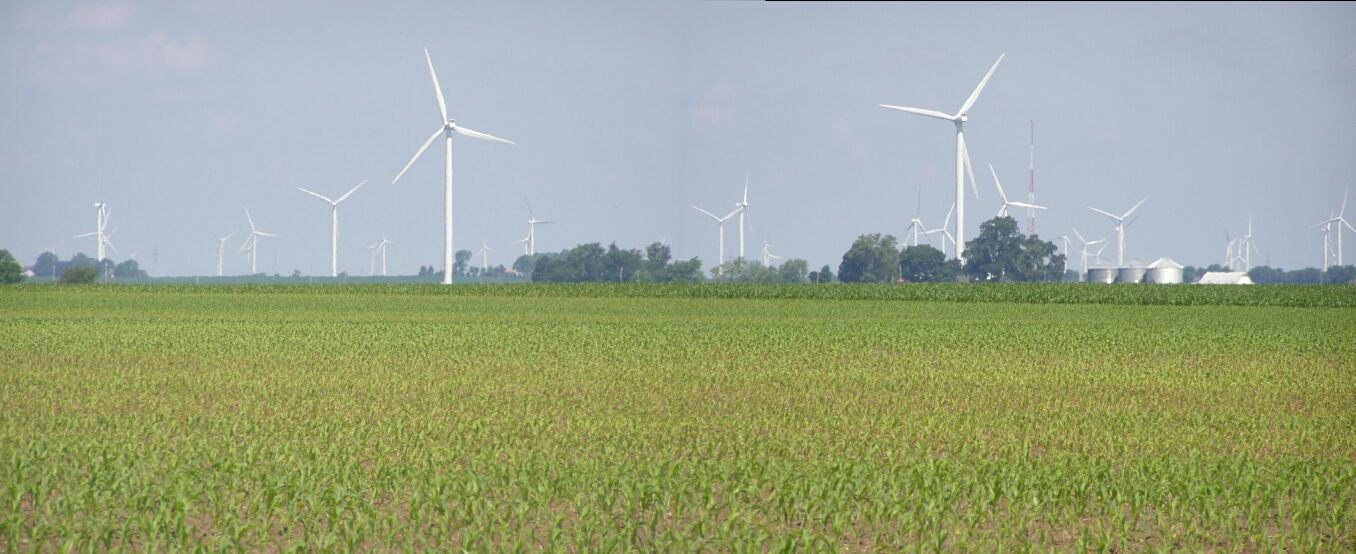
- View westward of Indiana State Road 43 in White County
- Location of Meadow Lake Wind Farm in Indiana
- Country: United States
- Location: Chalmers, Indiana
- Coordinates: 40°36′4″N 86°51′57″W
- Status: Operational
- Commission date: 2009
- Owner: EDP Renewables North America
- Operator: EDP Renewables North America

Wind farm
- Type: Onshore

Power generation
- Units operational: 414 turbines
- Nameplate capacity: 801 MW
- Capacity factor: 25.5% (average 2011-2018)
- Annual net output: approx. 1,900 GW·h

External links
- Website: meadowlakewindfarm.com
- Commons: Related media on Commons

Meadow Lake Wind Farm is an 801.25 megawatt (MW) wind farm near Brookston and Chalmers, Indiana, spreading over portions of White, Jasper, and Benton Counties. It is owned and operated by EDP Renewables North America. The facility currently has six operational phases, with 414 turbines, and is a prominent feature on both sides of Interstate 65 in western Indiana.

== Phase I ==
Phase I consists of 121 Vestas V82-1.65 MW wind turbines, for a total nameplate capacity of 199.65 MW. Groundbreaking ceremonies occurred on April 14, 2009. Phase I became operational in October 2009.

Horizon built a substation next to an existing AEP substation which was already within the wind farm site area. This allowed the wind farm to connect to the power grid without the need to build lengthy new transmission line at a cost of $1 million per mile.

== Phase II ==
Meadow Lake II Wind Farm has an installed capacity of 99 MW – enough to power approximately 27,000 average Indiana homes with clean energy. The wind farm, which consists of 66 Acciona AWs-1.5 MW turbines, achieved commercial operation in June 2010.

== Phase III ==
Meadow Lake III Wind Farm has an installed capacity of 103.5 MW – enough to power approximately 28,000 average Indiana homes with clean energy. The wind farm, which consists of 69 GE Energy SLE-1.5 MW turbines, achieved commercial operation in October 2010.

== Phase IV ==
Meadow Lake IV Wind Farm has an installed capacity of 98.7 MW – enough to power approximately 27,000 average Indiana homes with clean energy. The wind farm, which achieved commercial operation in October 2010, consists of 47 Suzlon S88-2.1 MW turbines.

== Phases V and VI ==
Meadow Lake V and VI have installed capacities of 100 MW and 200.4 MW, respectively. Phase V came fully online in 2018 and consists of 50 Vestas V110-2.0 MW turbines. Phase VI came fully online in 2019 and consists of 61 turbines (12 Vestas V110-2.0 MW wind turbines and 49 Vestas V136-3.6 MW).

== Future expansion ==
In early 2010, an EDP Renewables representative and local renewable energy advocates scouted the Meadow Lake project area for a location to build a visitor center. One possibility was an unused building near the intersection of I-65 and US-231 (40.667692°N 87.04073°W), near where a wind turbine will be installed within the next year.

== Environmental impact ==
At a planned ultimate nameplate capacity of 1000 MW, EDP Renewables North America claims that Meadow Lake would be one of the largest wind farms in the world. The Environmental Protection Agency (EPA) estimates that such facilities would generate enough electricity to power about 250,000 homes, annually saving 1,684 million gallons of water and eliminating 3.1 million tons of carbon dioxide emissions. Horizon further estimates that Phases I and II should eliminate just under one million tons of carbon dioxide emissions per year.

Phase I spreads over 26,000 acres (110 km^{2}) a ten by six mile area since large wind turbines must be spaced at least 5 to 10 rotor diameters apart to avoid wind shadowing. Most of the land between turbines remains productive farmland; only about 250 acres (1.0 km^{2}) of farmland have been taken out of production by the 121 turbines.

== Electricity production ==
Meadow Lake Wind Farm Generation (MW·h)
Year	Phase I 199.65 MW	Phase II 99 MW	Phase III 103.5 MW	Phase IV 98.7 MW	Phase V 100 MW	Phase VI 200.4 MW	Total Annual MW·h
2009	133,615*	-	-	-	-	-	133,615
2010	487,991	129,475*	96,145*	67,139*	-	-	780,750
2011	471,979	257,837	262,413	221,902	-	-	1,214,131
2012	466,874	249,120	257,788	214,956	-	-	1,188,738
2013	477,611	180,188	183,092	143,785	-	-	984,676
2014	495,416	161,358	170,177	134,214	-	-	961,165
2015	512,009	222,262	238,493	188,468	-	-	1,161,232
2016	467,962	248,764	266,678	206,549	-	-	1,189,953
2017	445,549	252,547	246,972	193,258	134,859*	-	1,237,185
2018	446,822	235,645	243,320	192,074	322,909	48,566*	1,489,336
2019	475,363	250,044	271,061	206,423	344,064	607,996	2,154,951
2020	454,807	241,687	259,528	187,807	327,008	619,719	2,090,556
2021	413,434	219,655	233,781	168,130	324,254	598,936	1,958,190
2022	460,692	245,956	278,766	202,332	349,662	671,626	2,209,034
Average Annual Production (phases 1–4, years 2011–2018) --->							1,119,510
Average Capacity Factor (phases 1–4, years 2011–2018) --->							25.5%

(*) partial year of operation

== See also ==
- Wind power in Indiana
- Benton County Wind Farm
- Fowler Ridge Wind Farm
