= Brookston, Indiana =

- Town
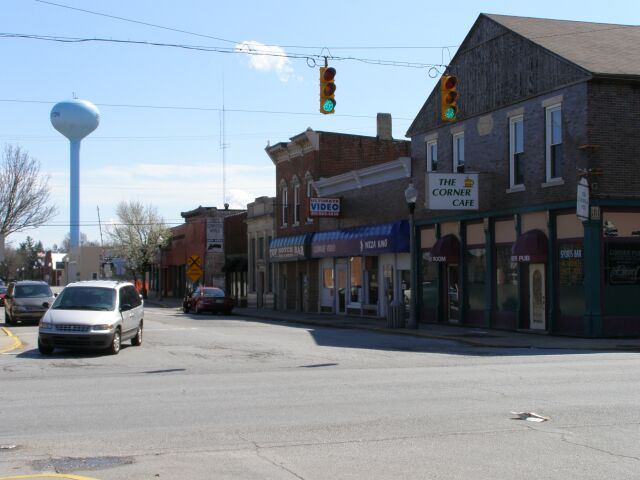
- Main Street from State Road 43
- Nickname: Star of the Prairie
- Location of Brookston in White County, Indiana.
- Coordinates: 40°36′03″N 86°51′59″W
- Country: United States
- State: Indiana
- County: White
- Township: Prairie
- Platted: 1853
- Incorporated: 1867

Area
  - Total: 0.66 sq mi (1.71 km^{2})
  - Land: 0.66 sq mi (1.71 km^{2})
  - Water: 0 sq mi (0.00 km^{2})
- Elevation: 679 ft (207 m)

Population (2020)
  - Total: 1,631
  - Density: 2,470.5/sq mi (953.87/km^{2})
- Time zone: UTC-5 (EST)
  - Summer (DST): UTC-5 (EST)
- ZIP code: 47923
- Area code: 765
- FIPS code: 18-08146
- GNIS feature ID: 2396608
- Website: www.townofbrookston.com

Brookston is a town in Prairie Township, White County, in the U.S. state of Indiana. The population was 1,631 as of the 2020 United States Census.

== History ==
Brookston was platted in 1853, and named for James Brooks, a railroad official. In 1867, Brookston was incorporated as a town.

The Brookston post office has been in operation since the town was platted.

== Geography ==
According to the 2010 census, the town has a total area of 0.66 square miles (1.7 km^{2}), all land.

== Demographics ==
Historical population
Census	Pop.	Note	%±
1870	406		—
1880	561		38.2%
1890	447		−20.3%
1900	949		112.3%
1910	907		−4.4%
1920	815		−10.1%
1930	844		3.6%
1940	826		−2.1%
1950	1,014		22.8%
1960	1,202		18.5%
1970	1,232		2.5%
1980	1,701		38.1%
1990	1,804		6.1%
2000	1,717		−4.8%
2010	1,554		−9.5%
2020	1,631		5.0%
US Decennial Census

=== 2020 census ===
As of the 2020 census, Brookston had a population of 1,631. The median age was 37.3 years. 24.3% of residents were under the age of 18 and 18.2% of residents were 65 years of age or older. For every 100 females there were 98.7 males, and for every 100 females age 18 and over there were 96.5 males age 18 and over.

0.0% of residents lived in urban areas, while 100.0% lived in rural areas.

There were 686 households in Brookston, of which 32.1% had children under the age of 18 living in them. Of all households, 44.2% were married-couple households, 19.2% were households with a male householder and no spouse or partner present, and 28.0% were households with a female householder and no spouse or partner present. About 31.3% of all households were made up of individuals and 11.5% had someone living alone who was 65 years of age or older.

There were 729 housing units, of which 5.9% were vacant. The homeowner vacancy rate was 1.0% and the rental vacancy rate was 10.0%.

Racial composition as of the 2020 census
Race	Number	Percent
White	1,506	92.3%
Black or African American	10	0.6%
American Indian and Alaska Native	5	0.3%
Asian	9	0.6%
Native Hawaiian and Other Pacific Islander	1	0.1%
Some other race	11	0.7%
Two or more races	89	5.5%
Hispanic or Latino (of any race)	41	2.5%

=== 2010 census ===
As of the 2010 United States census, there were 1,554 people, 624 households, and 430 families in the town. The population density was 2,354.5 inhabitants per square mile (909.1/km^{2}). There were 695 housing units at an average density of 1,053.0 per square mile (406.6/km^{2}). The racial makeup of the town was 98.0% White, 0.1% Native American, 0.2% Asian, 0.1% Pacific Islander, 0.5% from other races, and 1.2% from two or more races. Hispanic or Latino of any race were 2.6% of the population.

There were 624 households, of which 34.8% had children under the age of 18 living with them, 50.8% were married couples living together, 11.4% had a female householder with no husband present, 6.7% had a male householder with no wife present, and 31.1% were non-families. 26.1% of all households were made up of individuals, and 11.2% had someone living alone who was 65 years of age or older. The average household size was 2.49 and the average family size was 2.97.

The median age in the town was 37.6 years. 26.6% of residents were under the age of 18; 7% were between the ages of 18 and 24; 26.8% were from 25 to 44; 27.8% were from 45 to 64; and 11.9% were 65 years of age or older. The gender makeup of the town was 46.4% male and 53.6% female.

=== 2000 census ===
As of the 2000 United States census, there were 1,717 people, 691 households, and 503 families in the town. The population density was 2,895.8 inhabitants per square mile (1,118.1/km^{2}). There were 723 housing units at an average density of 1,219.4 per square mile (470.8/km^{2}). The racial makeup of the town was 98.89% White, 0.06% African American, 0.17% Native American, 0.17% Asian, 0.17% from other races, and 0.52% from two or more races. Hispanic or Latino of any race were 1.46% of the population.

There were 691 households, out of which 36.3% had children under the age of 18 living with them, 55.0% were married couples living together, 13.2% had a female householder with no husband present, and 27.2% were non-families. 23.2% of all households were made up of individuals, and 11.6% had someone living alone who was 65 years of age or older. The average household size was 2.48 and the average family size was 2.91.

The town population contained 28.1% under the age of 18, 6.1% from 18 to 24, 31.0% from 25 to 44, 22.9% from 45 to 64, and 11.8% who were 65 years of age or older. The median age was 36 years. For every 100 females there were 89.7 males. For every 100 females age 18 and over, there were 82.3 males.

The median income for a household in the town was $41,422, and the median income for a family was $47,011. Males had a median income of $35,645 versus $22,891 for females. The per capita income for the town was $18,291. About 4.0% of families and 5.2% of the population were below the poverty line, including 6.1% of those under age 18 and 5.7% of those age 65 or over.

== Education ==
The town has a lending library, the Brookston-Prairie Township Public Library. Frontier Elementary School is a K-6 school. The Frontier Junior-Senior High School is located in Chalmers, 2.4 miles (3.8 km) north of Brookston.

== Arts and culture ==
Since 1978 the town has held an annual Brookston Apple Popcorn Festival, on the third Saturday in September. The festival features food and cakes, musical entertainment, contests, races, vendor booths and yard sales.

Brookston is home to Jim Riley, whose agriculture market commentary was featured on the "Hoosier Ag Today" program through 2015.

== See also ==
- Meadow Lake Wind Farm
