= Camp Grove Wind Farm =

Wind farm in Illinois, United States

- Country: United States
- Location: Camp Grove, Illinois
- Coordinates: 41°4′11.7″N 89°34′41.2″W
- Status: Active
- Construction began: 2007
- Owner: Camp Grove Wind Farm LLC

Wind farm
- Type: Onshore
- Hub height: 80 m
- Rotor diameter: 77 m

Power generation
- Units operational: 100 x 1.5 MW
- Make and model: GE Energy 1.5sle
- Nameplate capacity: 150 MW
- Storage capacity: 100 MW

The Camp Grove Wind Farm is a 100-turbine wind farm composed of GE 1.5MW 77 meter rotor and with 80 meter hub height wind turbines in Marshall County and Stark County, Illinois, north of the city of Peoria. The owner of the project is Camp Grove Wind Farm LLC, which is owned by subsidiaries of Orion Energy Group LLC (Oakland, California), Vision Energy, LLC (Cincinnati, Ohio) and other investors. The project is managed by Orion Energy Group LLC, and, at 1.5 megawatts per General Electric turbine, has a nameplate capacity of 150 megawatts (mW).

The turbine farm began operations in November 2007. 75 mW of the power generated by Camp Grove, approximately one-half of the nameplate capacity, is sold pursuant to a 20-year contract to the Appalachian Power unit of American Electric Power, a multi-state electrical generation holding company. 60 of the turbines are located in Marshall County, and 40 in the smaller Stark County. The nearest village is Camp Grove, for which the wind farm is named.

Other wind farms developed by Orion and Vision include the Benton County Wind Farm and the Fowler Ridge Wind Farm.
