= Big Creek Township, White County, Indiana =

Big Creek Township
- Township
- Location in White County
- Coordinates: 40°41′16″N 86°51′40″W
- Country: United States
- State: Indiana
- County: White

Government
  - Type: Indiana township

Area
  - Total: 33.03 sq mi (85.5 km^{2})
  - Land: 33.03 sq mi (85.5 km^{2})
  - Water: 0 sq mi (0 km^{2}) 0%
- Elevation: 720 ft (220 m)

Population (2020)
  - Total: 870
  - Density: 26/sq mi (10/km^{2})
- ZIP codes: 47923, 47929, 47960, 47980
- GNIS feature ID: 453110

Big Creek Township is one of twelve townships in White County, Indiana, United States. As of the 2020 census, its population was 870 and it contained 356 housing units.

Big Creek Township was established in 1834, and named after Big Creek.

Historical population
Census	Pop.	Note	%±
1890	955		—
1900	1,292		35.3%
1910	1,080		−16.4%
1920	1,068		−1.1%
1930	1,063		−0.5%
1940	959		−9.8%
1950	913		−4.8%
1960	1,004		10.0%
1970	975		−2.9%
1980	911		−6.6%
1990	835		−8.3%
2000	856		2.5%
2010	819		−4.3%
2020	870		6.2%
Source: US Decennial Census

== Geography ==
According to the 2010 census, the township has a total area of 33.03 square miles (85.5 km^{2}), all land.

=== Cities, towns, villages ===
- Chalmers

=== Unincorporated towns ===
- Smithson at 40.717816°N 86.872514°W

(This list is based on USGS data and may include former settlements.)

=== Adjacent townships ===
- Honey Creek Township (north)
- Union Township (northeast)
- Jefferson Township, Carroll County (east)
- Prairie Township (south)
- West Point Township (west)

=== Cemeteries ===
The township contains these two cemeteries: High and Lane.

== School districts ==
- Frontier School Corporation

== Political districts ==
- Indiana's 4th congressional district
- State House District 15
- State Senate District 07
