= Indiana State Road 225 =

State highway in Indiana, United States

State Road 225
- SR 225 highlighted in red

Route information
- Maintained by INDOT
- Length: 3.968 mi (6.386 km)

Major junctions
- South end: Old SR 25
- North end: SR 43 near Battle Ground

Location
- Country: United States
- State: Indiana

Highway system
- Indiana State Highway System; Interstate; US; State; Scenic
← US 224	→ SR 227

State Road 225 is a short connector highway that exists entirely within Tippecanoe County in the U.S. state of Indiana.

== Route description ==
State Road 225 is a 4-mile (6.4 km) highway that connects State Road 43 at its west end with Old State Road 25 at its east end. The highway passes through the town of Battle Ground, Indiana. The highway passes a service entrance to Prophetstown State Park.

The most distinctive feature of this highway is the Jewettsport Ford Bridge over the Wabash River. The bridge is a one-lane truss bridge erected in 1912 and rehabilitated in 1989. In order to control the flow of traffic across the bridge, there is a traffic light at either end.

SR 225 at its southeastern end lies on low-lying land, which floods occasionally. When the Wabash level reaches 16 feet, the fields near SR 225 are flooded, and SR 225 itself is flooded when the Wabash reaches 17 feet or higher. The section of SR 225 between old SR 25 and Battle Ground is closed when flooded.

The bridge closed due to risk of further damage, and rehabilitation is planned to start in 2024, per INDOT.

== Major intersections ==
The entire route is in Tippecanoe County.

Location	mi	km	Destinations	Notes
Washington Township	0.000	0.000	Old SR 25	Southern terminus
Tippecanoe Township	3.968	6.386	SR 43 – Lafayette, Reynolds	Northern terminus
1.000 mi = 1.609 km; 1.000 km = 0.621 mi
