= EDP Renováveis =

Renewable energy company in Madrid, Spain

EDP Renováveis, S.A.
- Type: Public (Sociedade Anónima)
- Traded as: Euronext Lisbon: EDPR
- Industry: Renewable energy
- Founded: 2007 (as separate company)
- Headquarters: Madrid, Spain
- Key people: António Mexia (Chairman); João Manso Neto (CEO)
- Products: Wind energy
- Revenue: €1.697 billion (2018)
- Operating income: €754 million (2018)
- Net income: €313 million (2018)
- Total assets: €17.539 billion (end 2018)
- Total equity: €8.122 billion (end 2018)
- Number of employees: 1,388 (end 2018)
- Parent: Energias de Portugal
- Subsidiaries: EDP Renewables North America
- Website: www.edpr.com

EDP Renováveis (English: EDP Renewables, EDPR) is a renewable energy company registered in Oviedo, and headquartered in Madrid that designs, develops, manages and operates power plants that generate electricity using renewable energy sources.

EDPR was established in 2007 to hold and operate the growing renewable energy assets of parent company Energias de Portugal (EDP Group), Portugal's largest utility company headquartered in Lisbon. EDP Renováveis is the fourth-largest generator of wind energy globally.

EDPR's business includes wind farms and, to a limited but growing extent, solar energy activities. EDPR has continued to grow in recent years and is now present in 13 international markets (Brazil, Canada, Mexico, United States, Spain, Portugal, France, United Kingdom, Poland, Italy, Romania, Belgium and Greece).

== Geography ==
EDPR operates in three broad geographic areas: Europe, North America and South America. Its internal composition is organized similarly, being divided into three platforms: Europe and Brazil, North America (including the Canadian and Mexican markets) and Offshore.

It currently owns and operates wind farms in Brazil, Canada, Mexico, United States, Spain, Portugal, France, United Kingdom, Poland, Italy, Romania, Belgium and Greece.

== Ownership ==
EDPR's main shareholder is EDP Group. EDP holds significant electricity and gas operations in Europe, Brazil and the United States through its various constituent businesses.

EDP listed 22.5% of the company in an initial public offering on Euronext Lisbon in June 2008 at 8.00 Euro per share, upon which it immediately became a member of the benchmark PSI-20 index as its fifth-largest company by market capitalisation.

In spring 2017, EDP launched a buyback offer at 6.80 Euro per share for the minority shares in EDPR, 15% below the original price 9 years earlier, expected to lead to an enforced acquisition of the remaining minority shareholders (squeeze-out).

== Growth ==
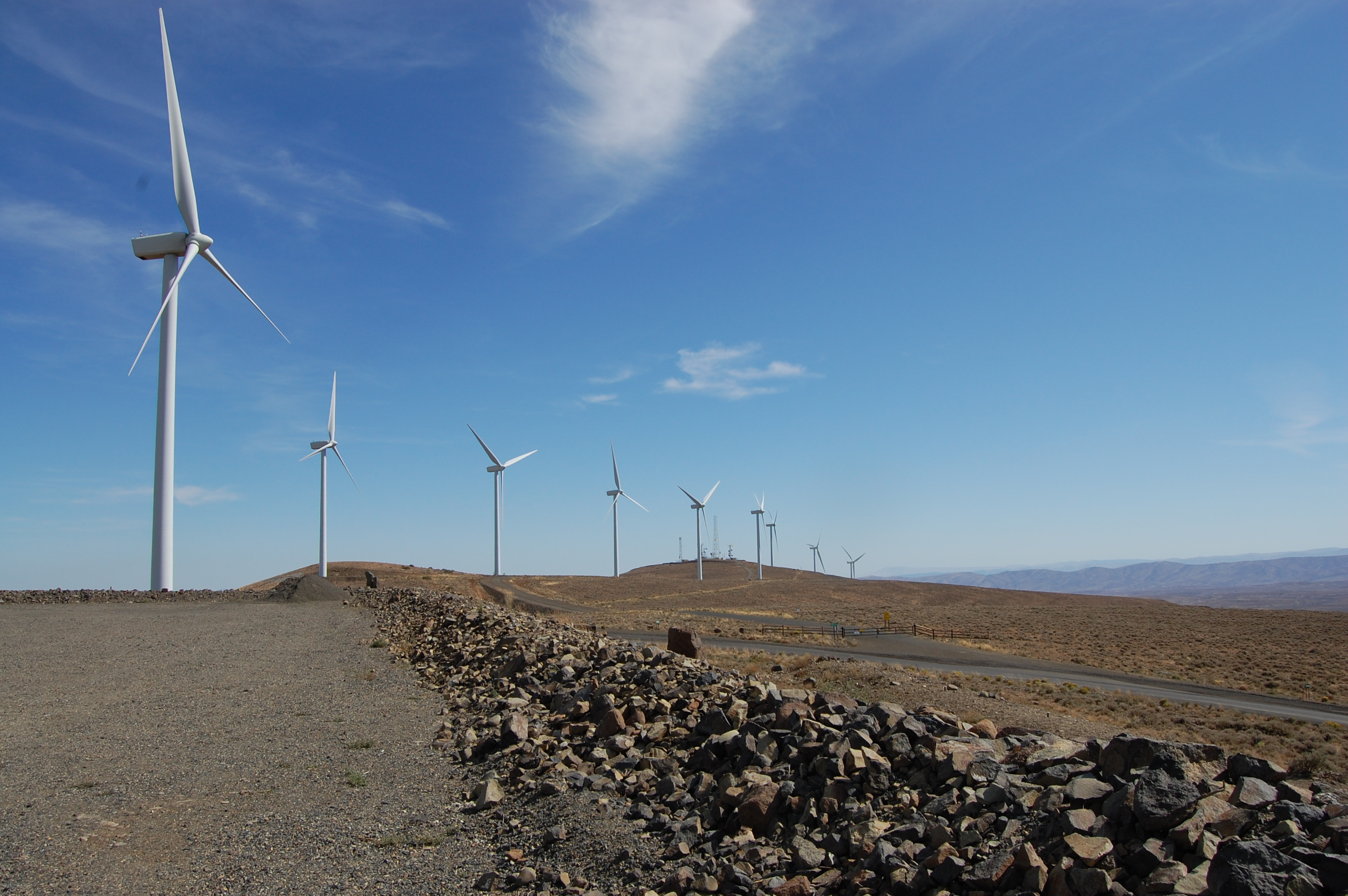
EDPR's Wild Horse Wind Farm in Kittitas County, Washington, United States

Former EDP Renováveis logo

Today EDPR is 4th in the world in wind energy based on net installed capacity and is consistently ranked in the top three in terms of growth in the sector.

At the end of 2018, EDPR had added 11.7 GW of installed wind capacity, putting it in fourth place in terms of wind energy production worldwide. In July 2021, EDPR sold three operational wind parks and two plants currently under construction to Onex for EUR 530 million, and bought a 28-MW solar plant in Vietnam.

In December 2025, it was announced that EDPR had completed the sale of its entire stake in a portfolio of five operational solar projects in Italy to Encavis. The assets, located in the Lazio and Puglia regions, have a combined capacity of 248 MW with an additional 17 MW expansion planned, and the transaction was valued at €300 million.

== See also ==
- Iberdrola Renovables
