= Indiana State Road 43 =

State highway in Indiana, United States

State Road 43
- SR 43 highlighted in red

Route information
- Maintained by INDOT
- Length: 40.800 mi (65.661 km)
- Existed: October 1, 1926–present

Southern section
- Length: 23.374 mi (37.617 km)
- South end: SR 54 near Solsberry
- North end: SR 46 near Spencer

Northern section
- Length: 17.426 mi (28.044 km)
- South end: I-65 near Battle Ground
- North end: US 24 / US 421 in Reynolds

Location
- Country: United States
- State: Indiana
- Counties: Greene, Owen, Monroe, Tippecanoe, White

Highway system
- Indiana State Highway System; Interstate; US; State; Scenic
← SR 42	→ SR 44

State Road 43 in the U.S. state of Indiana is split into two segments.

== Route description ==
=== Southern section ===
This winding, two-lane section of State Road 43 connects Indiana State Road 46 in Owen County near McCormick's Creek State Park with Indiana State Road 54 in eastern Greene County. It covers a distance of 23.374 miles (37.617 km).

=== Northern section ===
The northern portion of State Road 43 begins at I–65 near Battle Ground in Tippecanoe County. Going north, it passes through Brookston and Chalmers before terminating at US 24 and US 421 in Reynolds in White County. It covers a distance of 17.426 miles (28.044 km).

== History ==
SR 43 used to connect Michigan City and Solsberry. It followed SR 46 through Spencer, US 231 from Spencer to West Lafayette, and US 421 from Reynolds to Michigan City, along with its split sections.

The early 1950s renumbering of Indiana highways caused SR 43 to be concurrent. US 421 was extended into Indiana in 1951, and US 231 was commissioned in 1952. SR 43 was concurrent with US 421 until the northern terminus was truncated to Reynolds in 1955 in favor of US 421. A large portion of SR 43 from Lafayette to Spencer was eliminated in 1981 in favor of US 231.

In Lafayette, SR 43 basically followed the old routing of US 231 for most of the way. The route followed old US 231, 4th Street (after Alabama Street, it was 4th Street northbound and 3rd Street southbound), the Union Street bridge over the Wabash River, and River road after an interchange.

== Major intersections ==
County	Location	mi	km	Destinations	Notes
Greene	Center Township	0.000	0.000	SR 54	Southern terminus of SR 43
Owen	No major junctions				
Monroe	Richland Township	12.695	20.431	SR 48 east – Bloomington	Western terminus of SR 48
Owen	Washington Township	23.374	37.617	SR 46 – Spencer, Ellettsville	Northern terminus of the southern section of SR 43
Gap in route
Tippecanoe	Tippecanoe Township	23.375	37.618	I-65 – Indianapolis, Chicago	Exit number 178 on I-65; southern terminus of the northern section of SR 43
Tippecanoe	Battle Ground	24.839	39.974	SR 225 south	Northern terminus of SR 225
White	Brookston	30.651	49.328	SR 18 east – Delphi	Southern end of SR 18 concurrency
White	Brookston	30.831	49.618	SR 18 west – Fowler	Northern end of SR 18 concurrency
White	Reynolds	40.800	65.661	US 24 / US 421 – Monticello, Remington, Michigan City	Northern terminus of SR 43
1.000 mi = 1.609 km; 1.000 km = 0.621 mi: Concurrency terminus
