= Benton County Wind Farm =

Wind farm in Indiana

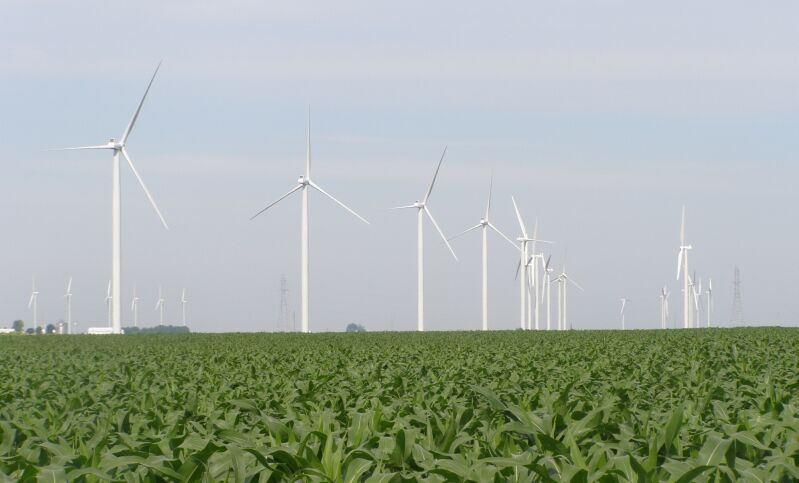
- Country: United States
- Location: Earl Park, Indiana
- Coordinates: 40.686105°N 87.408772°W
- Status: Operational

Wind farm
- Type: Onshore

Power generation
- Nameplate capacity: 130.5 MW

External links
- Commons: Related media on Commons

The Benton County Wind Farm (also called Goodland I) consists of 87 model sl/sle Gen4 GE 1.5 MW wind turbines near Earl Park, Indiana in northern Benton County, Indiana. The farm's nameplate capacity is 130.5 MW. The farm was developed by Orion Energy Group, LLC (Oakland, CA) and Vision Energy, LLC (Cincinnati, OH) beginning in 2003. It began commercial operation in April 2008. At the time of its construction, it was Indiana's only commercial-scale wind farm. Duke Energy purchases electricity from the wind farm and sells it to customers through its GoGreen program.

In August 2006, Duke Energy Indiana finalized its agreement to buy the output of 54 of the wind farm's 87 wind turbines for 20 years. This was the first significant long-term wind power purchase agreement in Indiana. The remaining 33 wind turbines in the wind farm sell their electricity to Duke and Vectren.

The owner of the project is Benton County Wind Farm LLC, which is owned by subsidiaries of Orion Energy Group LLC and other investors. The project is managed by Orion Energy Group LLC.

In early 2009, the nearby Fowler Ridge Wind Farm was Indiana's second wind farm to open, and became Indiana's largest wind farm.

Other wind farms developed by Orion and Vision include the Camp Grove Wind Farm and the Fowler Ridge Wind Farm.

== See also ==
- Wind power in Indiana
- Fowler Ridge Wind Farm - Benton County, Indiana
- Meadow Lake Wind Farm - White, Jasper, and Benton Counties
