= Chalmers, Indiana =

- Town
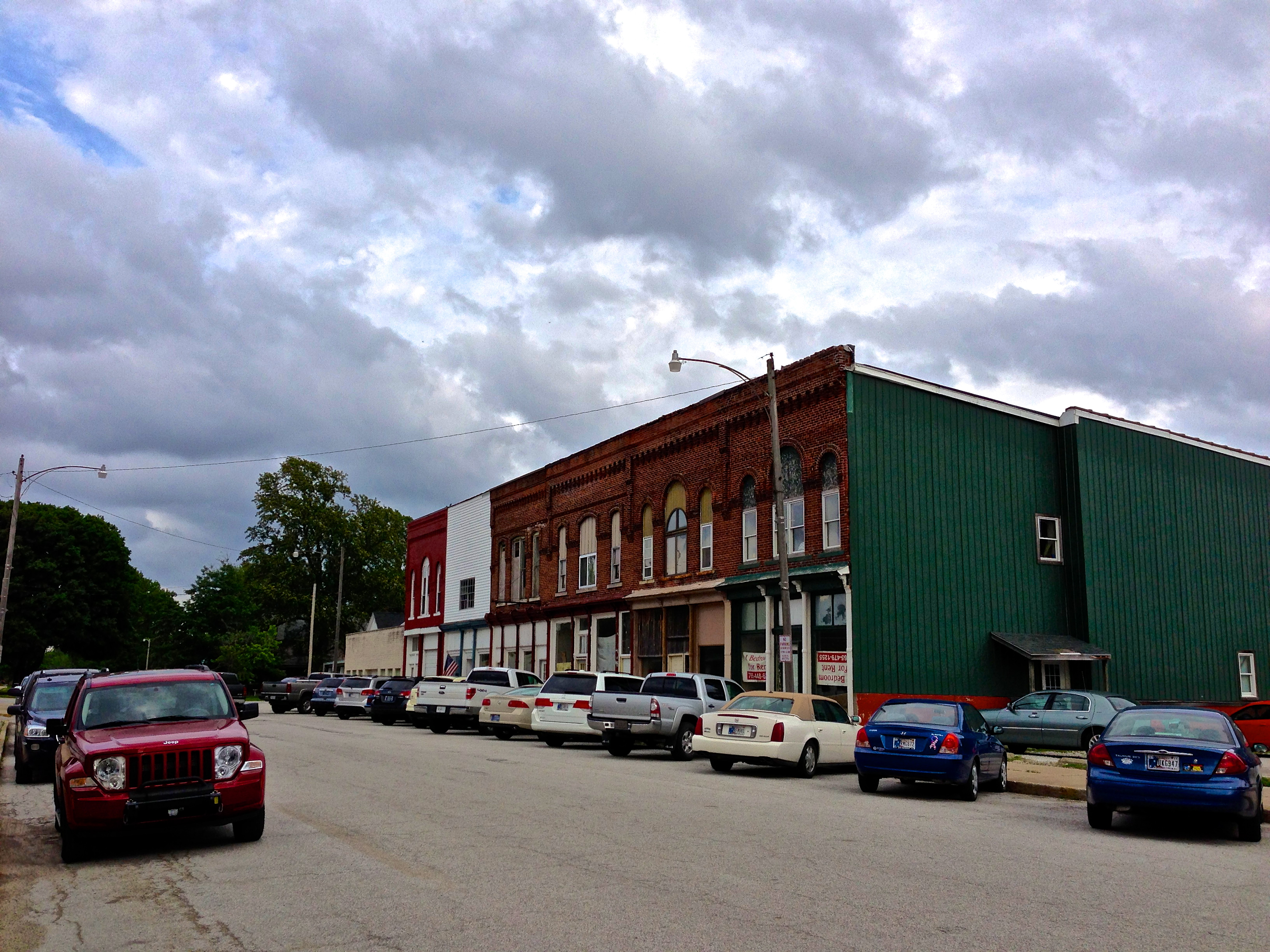
- Downtown Chalmers

- Location of Chalmers in White County, Indiana.
- Coordinates: 40°39′45″N 86°52′04″W
- Country: United States
- State: Indiana
- County: White
- Township: Big Creek
- Platted: 1873
- Incorporated: 1892
- Founder: Jacob Raub

Government
  - Type: Town council
  - President: Renee Collier
  - Vice President: Marcus King
  - Town Marshal: Jared Baer

Area
  - Total: 0.30 sq mi (0.78 km^{2})
  - Land: 0.30 sq mi (0.78 km^{2})
  - Water: 0 sq mi (0.00 km^{2})
- Elevation: 715 ft (218 m)

Population (2020)
  - Total: 523
  - Density: 1,732.1/sq mi (668.77/km^{2})
- Time zone: UTC-5 (EST)
  - Summer (DST): UTC-4 (EDT)
- ZIP code: 47929
- Area code: Area code 219
- FIPS code: 18-11944
- GNIS feature ID: 2396638
- Website: chalmers.in.gov

Chalmers is a town in Big Creek Township, White County in the U.S. state of Indiana. Its population was 523 at the 2020 census.

== History ==
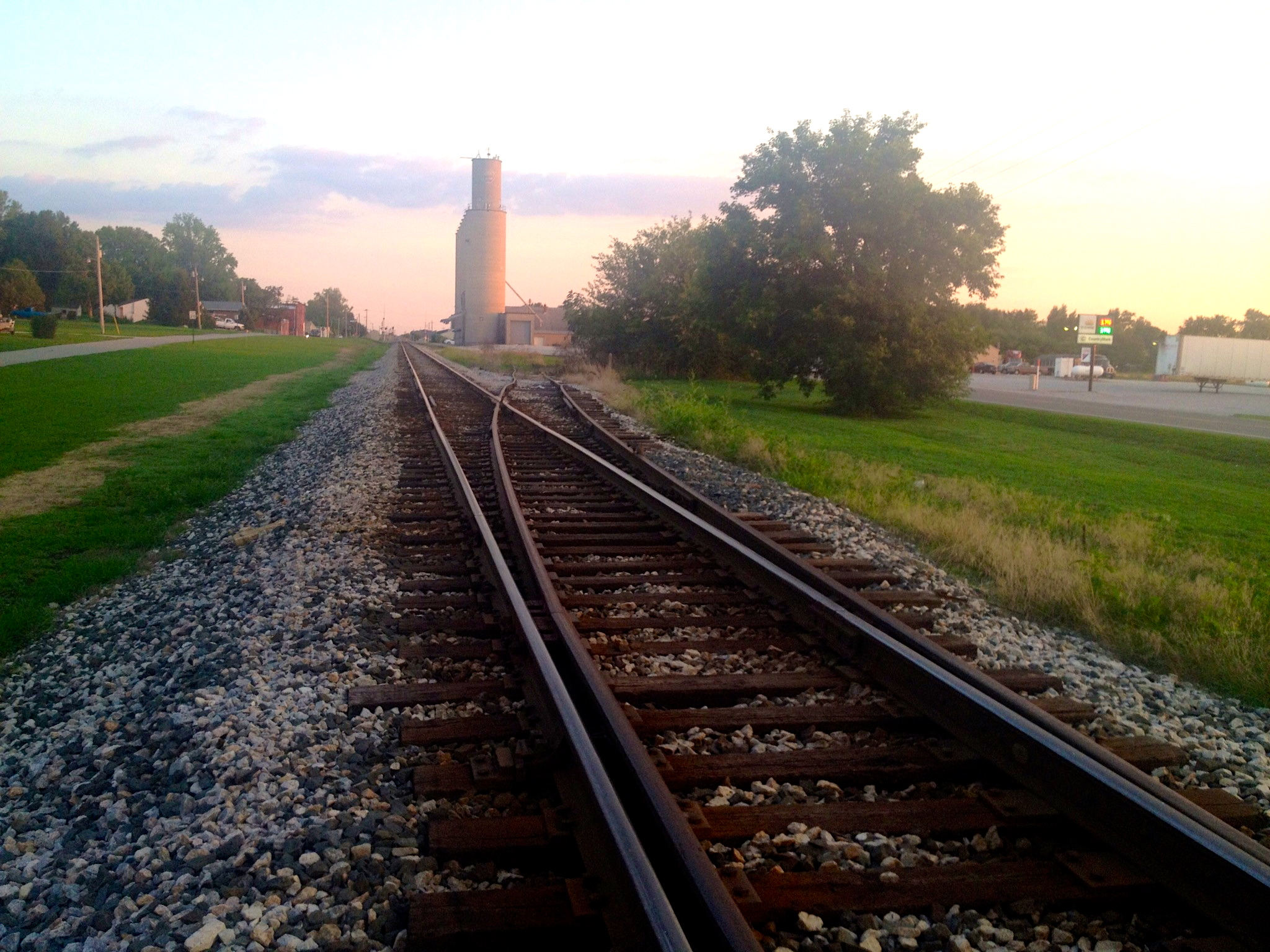
Chalmers historic railway

Chalmers dates back to the early 1850s. Land was donated by Gardner Mudge to the Chicago, Indianapolis and Louisville Railway in 1854 after the company constructed a rail line through Big Creek in 1853. Mudge and his brother-in-law operated a general store. On April 21, 1854, a Post Office was established with Mudge serving as postmaster.

Chalmers was platted on July 24, 1873; it included 103 lots on six streets. Several homes and stores were erected, and a school was constructed in the early 1870s. The first church was organized in 1878, and a tile factory was erected in the same year. The Bank of Chalmers was established by Jacob Raub in the early 1890s with a capital of $10,000. Chalmers became an incorporated town in 1892. "The Ledger" served as the first community newspaper, published initially in 1893. In 1895, a train station which later became a symbol of the town's history was constructed. The village was originally known by many as "Mudge's Station," after Gardner Mudge. The name "Chalmers" was listed on railroad timetables of New Albany and Salem as early as 1856. By 1912, Chalmers had approximately 600 residents. It consisted of two grain elevators, a factory, fifteen stores, two banks, two livery barns, three blacksmith shops, a lumber yard, two hotels, two garages, and dozens of homes.
Although the depot was demolished in 1976, the railroad which passes through Chalmers is still in use and is operated by CSX Transportation.

== Geography ==
According to the 2010 census, it has a total area of 0.25 square miles (0.65 km^{2}), all land.

=== Climate ===
According to the Köppen Climate Classification system, Chalmers has a hot-summer humid continental climate, abbreviated "Dfa" on climate maps. The hottest temperature recorded in Chalmers was 102 °F (38.9 °C) on June 27, 2005, and July 8, 2012, while the coldest temperature recorded was −22 °F (−30.0 °C) on January 3, 2018.

Climate data for Chalmers, Indiana, 1991–2020 normals, extremes 2000–present
Month	Jan	Feb	Mar	Apr	May	Jun	Jul	Aug	Sep	Oct	Nov	Dec	Year
Record high °F (°C)	68 (20)	73 (23)	85 (29)	89 (32)	96 (36)	102 (39)	102 (39)	98 (37)	89 (32)	93 (34)	79 (26)	69 (21)	102 (39)
Mean maximum °F (°C)	54.3 (12.4)	55.7 (13.2)	69.9 (21.1)	80.6 (27.0)	89.7 (32.1)	93.1 (33.9)	91.8 (33.2)	91.3 (32.9)	91.2 (32.9)	84.0 (28.9)	69.5 (20.8)	59.1 (15.1)	95.5 (35.3)
Mean daily maximum °F (°C)	31.2 (−0.4)	35.5 (1.9)	47.4 (8.6)	60.8 (16.0)	72.0 (22.2)	81.0 (27.2)	83.0 (28.3)	81.8 (27.7)	76.9 (24.9)	64.5 (18.1)	49.5 (9.7)	36.8 (2.7)	60.0 (15.6)
Daily mean °F (°C)	23.7 (−4.6)	27.2 (−2.7)	37.8 (3.2)	49.4 (9.7)	60.6 (15.9)	70.0 (21.1)	72.3 (22.4)	70.7 (21.5)	64.6 (18.1)	53.0 (11.7)	40.3 (4.6)	29.4 (−1.4)	49.9 (10.0)
Mean daily minimum °F (°C)	16.2 (−8.8)	18.9 (−7.3)	28.3 (−2.1)	38.0 (3.3)	49.2 (9.6)	59.1 (15.1)	61.7 (16.5)	59.6 (15.3)	52.2 (11.2)	41.4 (5.2)	31.0 (−0.6)	22.0 (−5.6)	39.8 (4.3)
Mean minimum °F (°C)	−5.7 (−20.9)	−5.1 (−20.6)	11.5 (−11.4)	24.3 (−4.3)	34.8 (1.6)	47.9 (8.8)	51.7 (10.9)	49.8 (9.9)	41.4 (5.2)	27.9 (−2.3)	15.6 (−9.1)	4.1 (−15.5)	−11.3 (−24.1)
Record low °F (°C)	−22 (−30)	−20 (−29)	−7 (−22)	15 (−9)	27 (−3)	37 (3)	43 (6)	43 (6)	34 (1)	23 (−5)	3 (−16)	−11 (−24)	−22 (−30)
Average precipitation inches (mm)	2.54 (65)	2.06 (52)	2.78 (71)	3.93 (100)	4.26 (108)	5.54 (141)	4.50 (114)	4.04 (103)	3.00 (76)	3.07 (78)	2.91 (74)	2.36 (60)	40.99 (1,042)
Average snowfall inches (cm)	6.6 (17)	6.2 (16)	2.5 (6.4)	0.4 (1.0)	0.0 (0.0)	0.0 (0.0)	0.0 (0.0)	0.0 (0.0)	0.0 (0.0)	0.0 (0.0)	0.5 (1.3)	4.1 (10)	20.3 (51.7)
Average precipitation days (≥ 0.01 in)	10.3	9.4	10.9	12.1	12.7	11.7	10.3	9.4	8.6	9.5	10.3	11.0	126.2
Average snowy days (≥ 0.1 in)	4.9	4.2	1.9	0.3	0.0	0.0	0.0	0.0	0.0	0.0	0.5	3.3	15.1
Source 1: NOAA
Source 2: National Weather Service (mean maxima/minima 2006–2020)

== Demographics ==
Historical population
Census	Pop.	Note	%±
1900	462		—
1910	513		11.0%
1920	528		2.9%
1930	510		−3.4%
1940	475		−6.9%
1950	508		6.9%
1960	548		7.9%
1970	544		−0.7%
1980	554		1.8%
1990	525		−5.2%
2000	513		−2.3%
2010	508		−1.0%
2020	523		3.0%
U.S. Decennial Census

=== 2010 census ===
As of the census of 2010, there were 508 people, 203 households, and 137 families residing in the town. The population density was 2,032.0 inhabitants per square mile (784.6/km^{2}). There were 226 housing units at an average density of 904.0 per square mile (349.0/km^{2}). The racial makeup of the town was 97.0% White, 0.2% Asian, 1.8% from other races, and 1.0% from two or more races. Hispanic or Latino of any race were 2.2% of the population.

There were 203 households, of which 33.5% had children under the age of 18 living with them, 53.7% were married couples living together, 10.3% had a female householder with no husband present, 3.4% had a male householder with no wife present, and 32.5% were non-families. 28.6% of all households were made up of individuals, and 13.8% had someone living alone who was 65 years of age or older. The average household size was 2.50 and the average family size was 3.07.

The median age in the town was 40.1 years. 25% of residents were under the age of 18; 7.6% were between the ages of 18 and 24; 26.2% were from 25 to 44; 27.9% were from 45 to 64; and 13.2% were 65 years of age or older. The gender makeup of the town was 49.0% male and 51.0% female.

=== 2000 census ===
As of the census of 2000, there were 513 people, 185 households, and 133 families residing in the town. The population density was 2,055.7 inhabitants per square mile (793.7/km^{2}). There were 190 housing units at an average density of 761.4 per square mile (294.0/km^{2}). The racial makeup of the town was 99.61% White, and 0.39% from two or more races. Hispanic or Latino of any race were 1.17% of the population.

There were 185 households, out of which 40.0% had children under the age of 18 living with them, 60.5% were married couples living together, 8.6% had a female householder with no husband present, and 28.1% were non-families. 23.2% of all households were made up of individuals, and 13.0% had someone living alone who was 65 years of age or older. The average household size was 2.77 and the average family size was 3.32.

In the town, the population was spread out, with 31.6% under the age of 18, 7.2% from 18 to 24, 32.4% from 25 to 44, 18.9% from 45 to 64, and 9.9% who were 65 years of age or older. The median age was 33 years. For every 100 females, there were 91.4 males. For every 100 females age 18 and over, there were 90.8 males.

The median income for a household in the town was $51,591, and the median income for a family was $55,833. Males had a median income of $31,667 versus $21,518 for females. The per capita income for the town was $19,258. About 5.4% of families and 3.6% of the population were below the poverty line, including 4.9% of those under age 18 and 7.7% of those age 65 or over.

== Arts and culture ==
The annual Chalmers Community Day features a pancake breakfast and a pork dinner, a car show, and a motorcycle show.

Meadow Lake Wind Farm, one of the largest onshore wind farms in the world, is located beside Chalmers.

== Parks and recreation ==
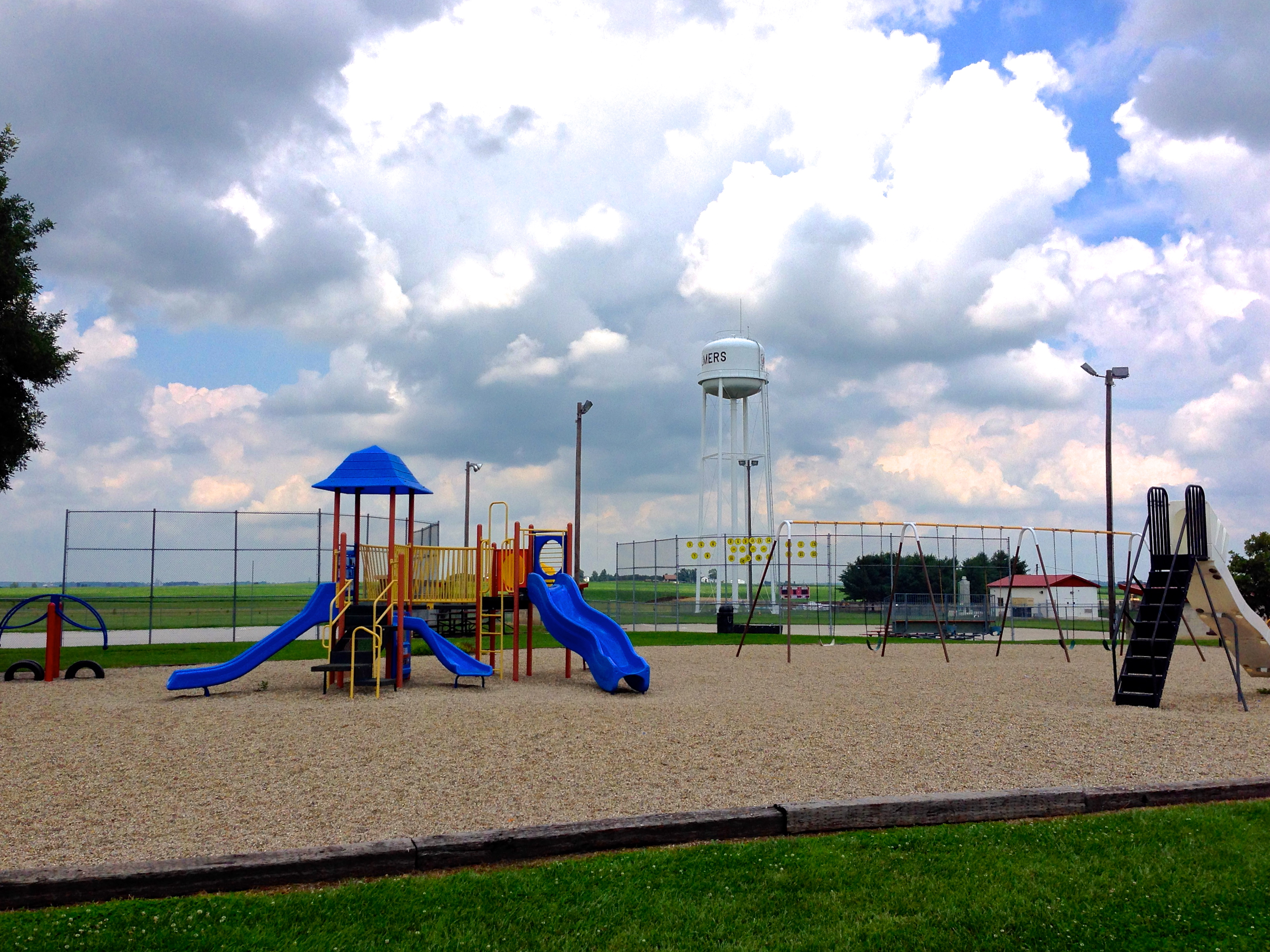
Playground at Chalmers Community Park with a softball fields in background

Parks include:

- Chalmers Community Park, featuring a playground, pavilion, trails, and sports facilities.
- Downtown park, featuring a gazebo and a locally designed mural.

== Government ==
Chalmers has a community-operated government and is managed by a small town council. The Chalmers Town Hall shares a building with the Chalmers Volunteer Fire Department. It is used for council and board meetings, and is the office of the town's clerk-treasurer.

== Education ==
Frontier School Corporation, a public school system, is headquartered in Downtown Chalmers. Most Chalmers students are enrolled in this district. Its single secondary school, Frontier Junior-Senior High School, was formed to replace the former Chalmers High School as well as the schools in Brookston. Elementary-level children attend the primary school of the same corporation in Brookston, Frontier Elementary School. For the 2012–2013 school year, Frontier was honored as a grade "A" school corporation by the Indiana Department of Education.
