= Senvion =

German wind turbine manufacturer

Senvion S.A.

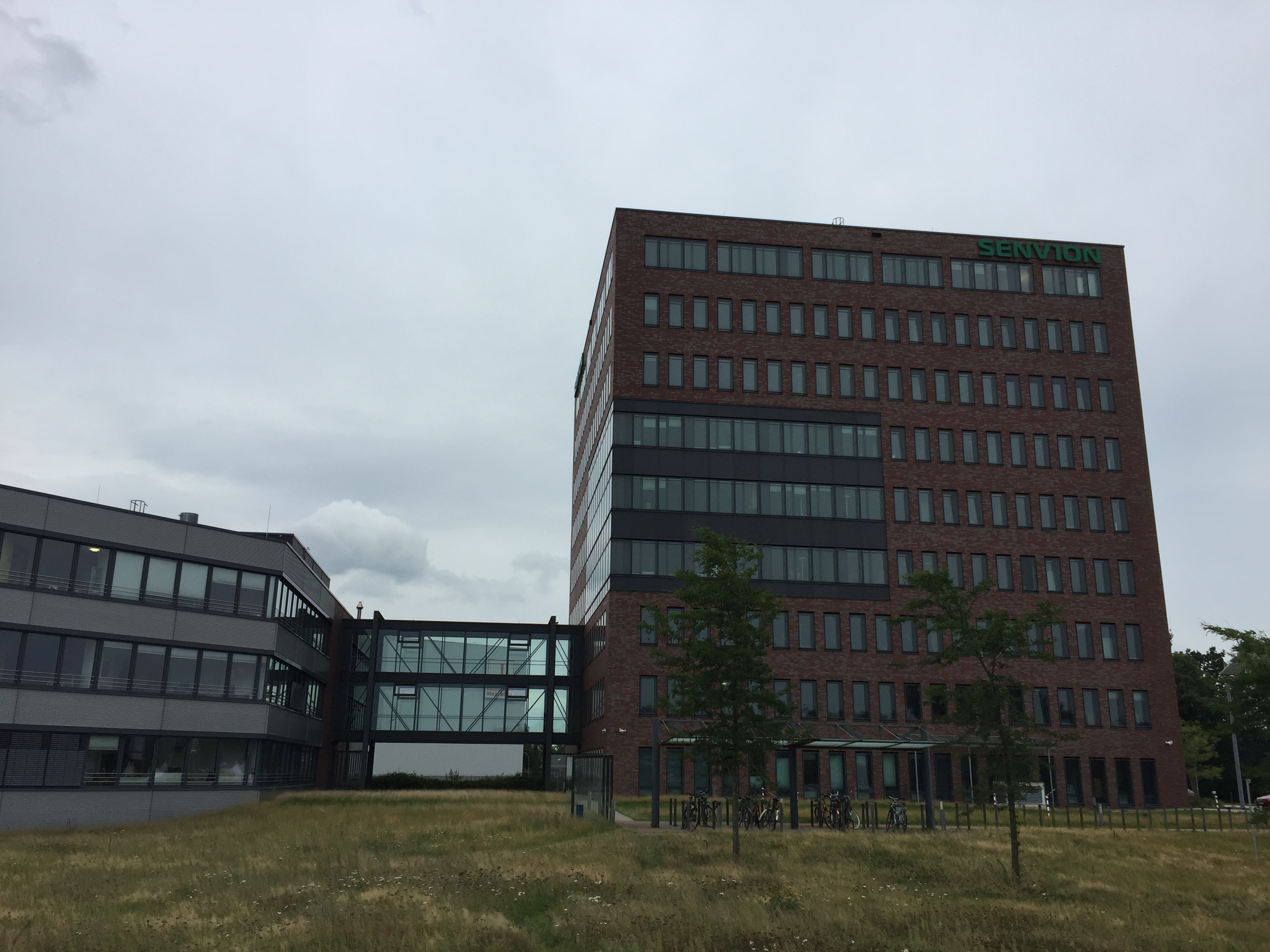
- Administrative building in 2019
- Type: Société Anonyme
- Traded as: FWB: SEN
- Industry: Renewable power
- Founded: 2001
- Headquarters: Hamburg, Germany
- Key people: Yves Rannou (CEO)
- Products: Wind turbines
- Revenue: ▼€ 1.89 billion (2017)
- Number of employees: 4500 (2017)
- Parent: Siemens Gamesa
- Website: www.senvion.com

Senvion S.A. (called REpower Systems SE until 2014) was a German wind turbine manufacturer founded in 2001 in Germany, majority owned by a private equity firm. Senvion as REpower Systems, as it was initially called, was established in 2001 through the merger of German wind companies: HSW (Husumer Schiffswerft), the engineering consultancy Pro+Pro (a subsidiary of Denker&Wulf and aerodyn Energiesysteme GmbH), the wind turbine manufacturer BWU and Jacobs Energie; and since April 2015 Centerbridge Partners. It was under the ownership of Suzlon, an India wind turbine manufacturer, from 2007 to 2015.

With equipment pricing under pressure due to auctions, Senvion filed for insolvency in German courts in early April 2019. Senvion sold its 9 GW European service fleet to Siemens Gamesa in October 2019. A Saudi Arabian company, Alfanar, acquired the Indian division of Senvion in 2021.

== See also ==
- Hallett Wind Farm
- Hoosier Wind Farm
- List of offshore wind farms
- List of wind turbine manufacturers
- Wind power in Germany
- Wind power in India
