= Fowler Ridge Wind Farm =

Wind farm in Indiana, USA

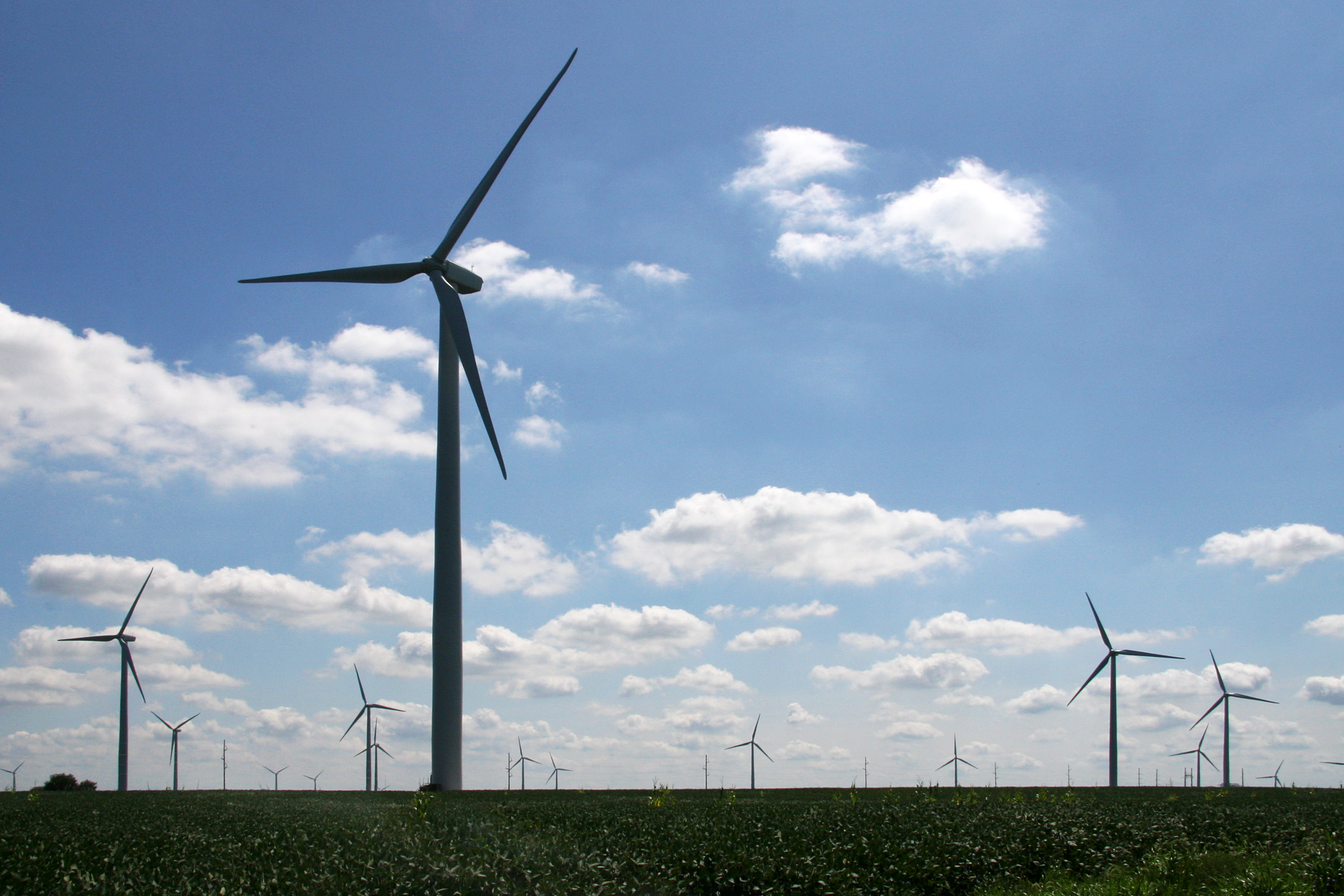
- Fowler Ridge Wind Farm
- Country: United States
- Location: Fowler, Indiana, United States
- Coordinates: 40°35′N 87°20′W
- Status: Operational
- Commission date: 2008
- Owners: BP (50%); American Electric Power(50%)

Wind farm
- Type: Onshore

Power generation
- Units operational: 355
- Make and model: Vestas V82-1.65 MW (F1); Clipper C-96 2.5 MW (F1); GE 1.5 MW (F2)
- Nameplate capacity: 600 MW
- Capacity factor: 27.8% (average 2010-2018)
- Annual net output: 1,460 GW·h

External links
- Commons: Related media on Commons

The Fowler Ridge Wind Farm is a wind farm in Benton County, Indiana, near the city of Fowler, IN about 30 miles (48 km) northwest of Lafayette and 90 miles (140 km) northwest of Indianapolis. Fowler Ridge was originally developed in 2005 and 2006 by Orion Energy, LLC (Oakland, CA) and Vision Energy, LLC (Cincinnati, OH) and later sold in 2007 to BP and Dominion Resources. The project was constructed beginning in 2008 in two phases and has a nameplate capacity of 600 MW.

Fowler Ridge was the second utility-scale wind power plant in Indiana, after the 130.5 MW Goodland I Wind Farm (also in Benton County and was also developed by Orion Energy, LLC (Oakland, CA) and Vision Energy, LLC (Cincinnati, OH)). The Benton County Wind Farm came online in 2008. Some of the wind turbines are visible from US 52, the main highway through the County. They are also visible along US 41 in the Boswell area. Other wind farms developed by Orion and Vision include the Camp Grove Wind Farm and the Benton County Wind Farm.

== Phase one ==
The first phase of the project is online and consists of 222 wind turbines, 182 Vestas V82-1.65 MW turbines and 40 Clipper C-96 2.5 MW turbines, with a nameplate capacity of 400 MW.

== Phase two ==
Phase two consists of 133 GE 1.5 MW wind turbines with a total nameplate capacity of 200 MW. Construction began in early 2009 and phase two became operational in early 2010.

== Electricity production ==
Fowler Ridge Wind Electricity Generation
Year	Total Annual MW·h
2008	5,464
2009	830,401
2010	1,499,812
2011	1,447,913
2012	1,441,180
2013	1,482,943
2014	1,531,573
2015	1,612,058
2016	1,480,131
2017	1,319,565
2018	1,328,554
Average (years 2010–2018)	1,460,414

== See also ==
- Wind power in Indiana
- Benton County Wind Farm - Benton County, Indiana
- Meadow Lake Wind Farm - White, Jasper, and Benton Counties
