= Business Energy Investment Tax Credit =

The Business Energy Investment Tax Credit (ITC) is a U.S. federal corporate tax credit that is applicable to commercial, industrial, utility, and agricultural sectors. Eligible technologies for the ITC are solar water heat, solar space heat, solar thermal electric, solar thermal process heat, photovoltaics, wind, biomass, geothermal electric, fuel cells, geothermal heat pumps, CHP/cogeneration, solar hybrid lighting, microturbines, and geothermal direct-use.

This program is co-administered by the US Internal Revenue Service (IRS) and the U.S. Department of Energy (DOE). The tax credits were expanded by the American Recovery and Reinvestment Act of 2009 and most components will last until December 31, 2016.

== History ==
The history of federal energy tax policy can be divided into four eras: the oil and gas period from 1916 to 1970, the energy crisis period of the 1970s, the free market era of the Reagan Administration, and the post-Reagan era.

The United States federal energy tax policy historically focused on the increased production of oil and natural gas with no focus on alternative energy or conservation. Two policies were the driving force that allowed this policy to become successful. The first was expending of intangible drilling costs (IDCs). This allowed companies to write off costs such as labor costs, material costs, supplies, and repairs associated with drilling a well which allowed companies to write off their start up costs to make a profit in their start up year. The second policy was a depletion allowance that allowed oil and gas producers to claim 27.5% of revenue as a deduction for the cost of exhaustion or depletion of the deposit. This allowed for reduced capital investment and encouraged businesses to develop their resource faster. Oil and gas production increased from 16% of total U.S. energy production in 1920 to 71.1% of total energy production in 1970.

Large revenue losses associated with the oil and gas tax preferences compared to federal deficit cuts, the oil embargo of 1973, and the Iranian Revolution from 1978-1979 led to a shift in energy policy to alternative energy and conservation. The first major change was the reduction of IDCs and percent depletion for the oil and gas companies. The second change was the implementation of the Energy Tax Act of 1978 which started taxing cars with sub par fuel economy. New energy tax credits were also placed. Examples include investment in conservation or alternative fuels technologies, such as synthetic fuels, solar, wind, geothermal, and biomass. There was also tax credits for production of alcohol fuels, percentage depletion for geothermal deposits, and exempting facilities that turned solid waste into fuel from federal taxation of interest.

The Reagan Administration brought along a more neutral stance on energy tax policy that did not promote oil and gas development, energy conservation, or the supply of alternative fuels. This would allow true oil prices that were very high to be shown and would encourage private investment in alternative energy development. The tax credits previously put in place were not renewed and only the tax credits for business solar, geothermal, ocean thermal, and biomass technologies were extended. This however resulted in negative effective tax rates for many investments, including alternative energy investments. The lowered tax credits for oil and gas were still high enough to make those investments a more attractive option.

== Latest energy tax policy ==
On June 28, 2005, the Senate approved an expansive energy bill with an 11-year, $18.6 billion package of energy tax breaks with a renewed focus toward renewable energy resources and conservation. Tax credits were introduced for Solar Water Heat, Solar Space Heat, Solar Thermal Electric, Solar Thermal Process Heat, Photovoltaics, Wind, Biomass, Geothermal Electric, Fuel Cells, Geothermal Heat Pumps, CHP/Cogeneration, Solar Hybrid Lighting, Microturbines, and Geothermal Direct-Use.

These tax credits were greatly expanded in 2008 as part of the Energy Improvement and Extension Act of 2008. The American Recovery and Reinvestment Act of 2009 is the latest expansion of energy tax credits and has laid out the framework of tax credit policy until 31 December 2016.

== Incentives ==
=== Solar ===
Technologies that directly convert solar energy to electric, heat water, and heat space are included in the tax credit. Solar credits do not have a maximum. 30% of all expenditures can be included in the credit. Eligible technologies for the solar credit are equipment that uses solar energy to generate electricity, to heat or cool (or provide hot water for use in) a structure, or to provide solar process heat. Hybrid lighting systems that use fiber optics to distribute light and illuminate the inside of a building are also eligible for the credit. Passive solar systems and solar pool heating systems are not included in the credit.

=== Wind ===
Wind technologies include any turbine that uses the flow of air to generate electricity. Wind credits are for small turbines that generate up to 100 kW. There was no original max credit for wind turbines, but after 2008 the maximum credit was set at $4,000. The American Recovery and Reinvestment Act of 2009 removed the maximum credit for wind turbines so there is currently no maximum credit.

=== Fuel cells ===
A fuel cell is an electrochemical cell that converts chemical energy from a fuel into electric energy. The credit is equal to 30% of expenditures, with no maximum credit. However, the credit for fuel cells is capped at $1,500 per 0.5 kilowatt (kW) of capacity. Eligible property includes fuel cells with a minimum capacity of 0.5 kW that have an electricity-only generation efficiency of 30% or higher.

=== Microturbines ===
A microturbine is a small turbine that is generally used for combined heat and power, and distributed power applications. The credit is equal to 10% of expenditures, with no maximum credit limit stated. The credit for microturbines is capped at $200 per kW of capacity. Eligible property includes microturbines up to two megawatts in capacity that have an electricity only generation efficiency of 26% or higher.

=== Combined heat and power ===
Combined heat and power is the use of a heat engine or a power station to simultaneously generate both electricity and useful heat. The credit is equal to 10% of expenditures, with no maximum. Combined heat and power systems must exceed 60% energy efficiency to be included in the credit. The max amount of power the system can generate is 50 megawatts to meet the credit requirements. The efficiency requirement does not apply to combined heat and power systems that use biomass for at least 90% of the system's energy source, but the credit may be reduced for less-efficient systems.

=== Geothermal systems ===
Geothermal for businesses is using the earth as a heat and cooling source to lower the cost of air conditioning and heating. The credit is equal to 10% of expenditures, with no maximum credit limit stated. Eligible geothermal energy property includes geothermal heat pumps and equipment used to produce, distribute or use energy derived from a geothermal deposit. For electricity produced by geothermal power, equipment qualifies only up to, but not including, the electric transmission stage.
