= EDP Renewables North America =

North American energy company

- Type: Subsidiary
- Industry: Renewable energy
- Predecessor: Zilkha Renewable Energy; Horizon Wind Energy
- Headquarters: Houston, Texas, United States
- Products: Wind energy Solar energy Energy storage
- Revenue: $931.19 million (2019)
- Operating income: $688.1 million (2019)
- Number of employees: 1100
- Parent: EDP Renováveis
- Website: https://www.edprnorthamerica.com/

EDP Renewables North America (former names: Zilkha Renewable Energy and Horizon Wind Energy) is a renewable energy company based in Houston, Texas that operates wind farms and solar parks. It is a subsidiary of the Portuguese-Spanish company EDP Renováveis (Spanish: EDP Renovables), the fourth-largest wind energy company in the world. As of 2025 it operated 61 wind farms and 26 solar parks.

== History ==
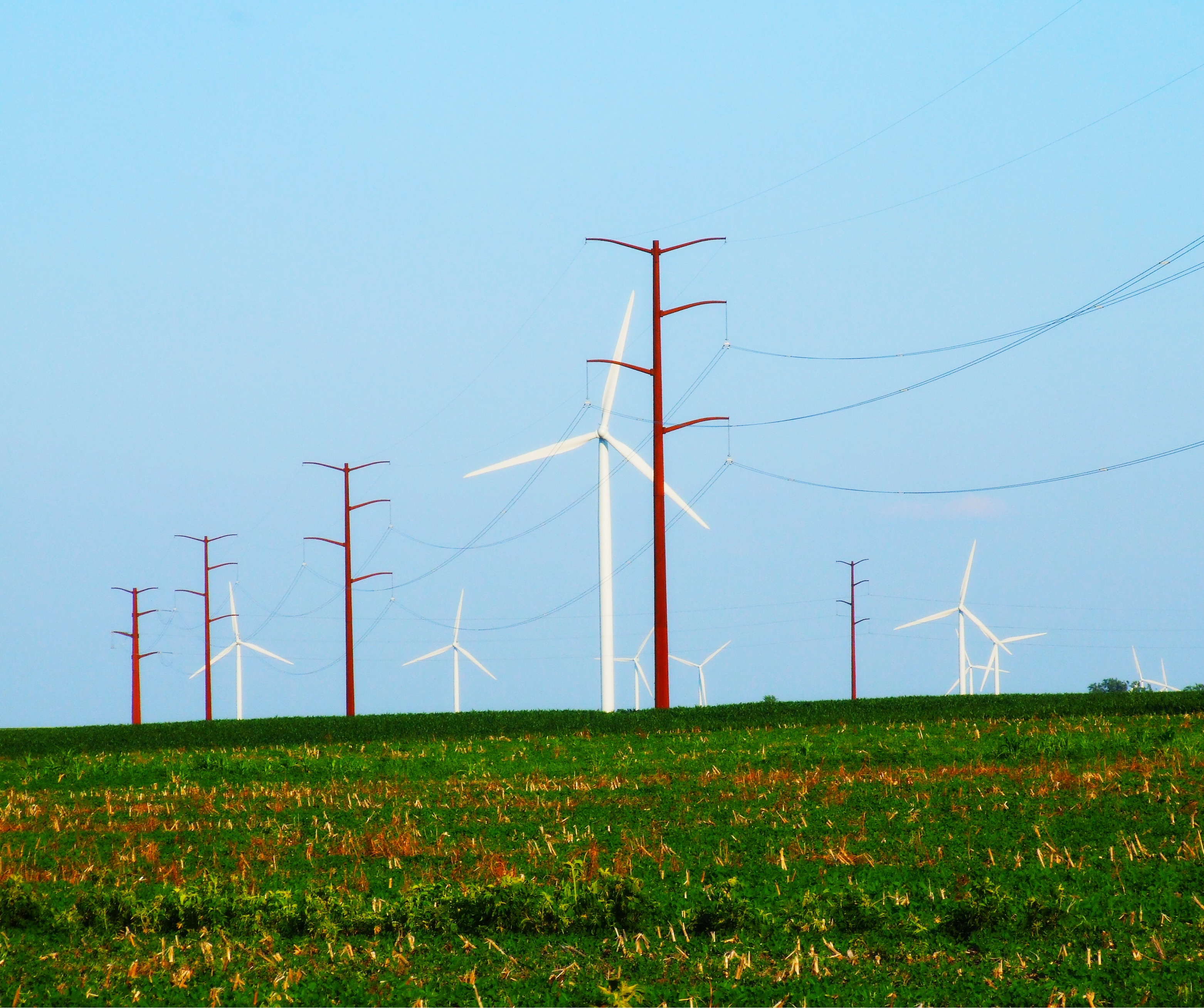
Twin Groves Wind Farm in McLean County, Illinois

In 2005, the company (then called Zilkha Renewable Energy, and owned by Selim Zilkha and Michael Zilkha) was purchased by investment bank Goldman Sachs for an undisclosed sum and renamed Horizon Wind Energy. In 2007, the company was acquired by EDP Renováveis' parent company Energias de Portugal for $2.15 billion and later renamed EDP Renewables North America.
