= Rebecca Rankin Round Barn =

- U.S. National Register of Historic Places
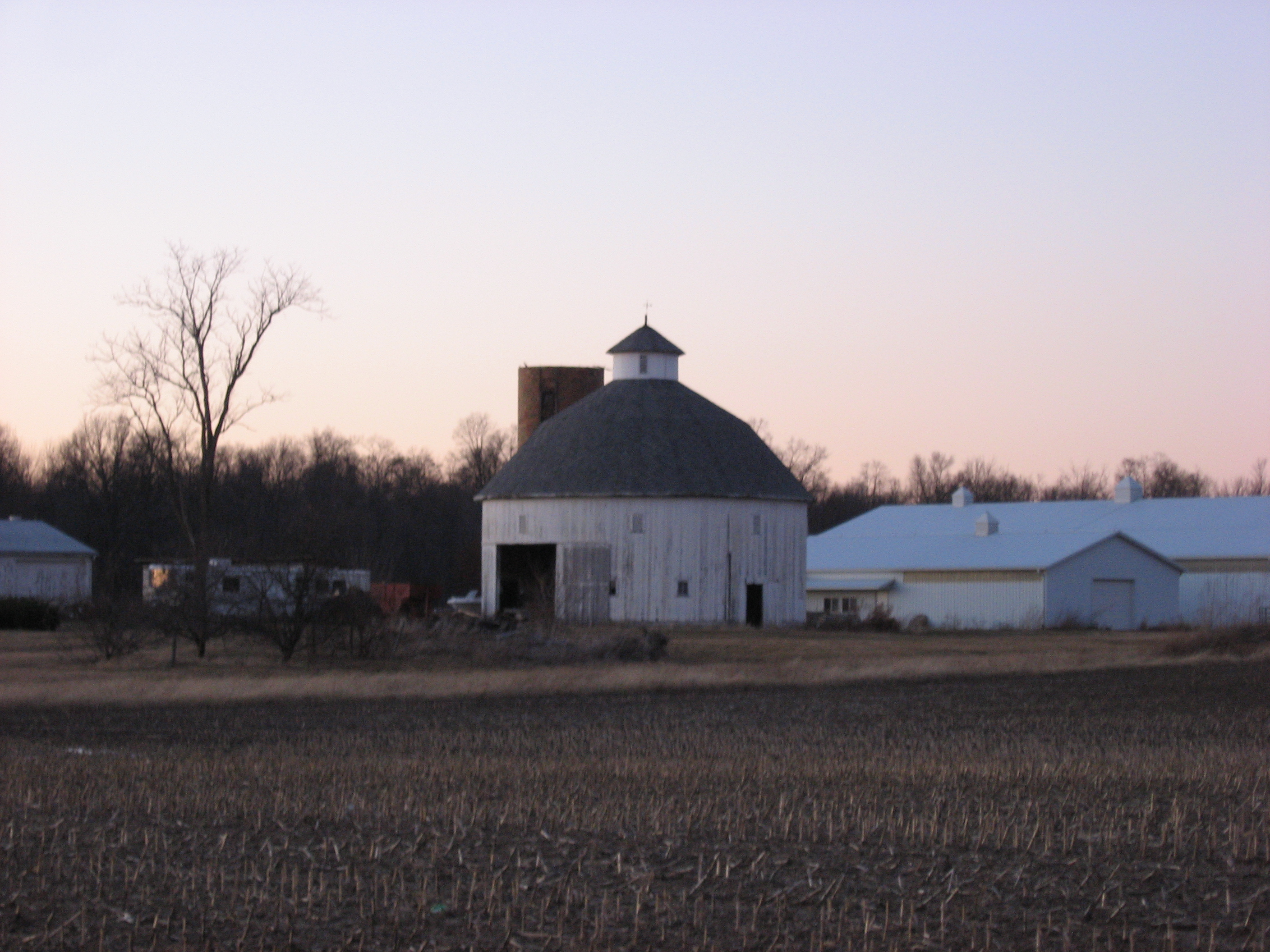
- View from State Road 18

- Location within Indiana Location within the United States
- Nearest city: Poling, Indiana
- Coordinates: 40°33′16″N 85°6′40″W
- Area: Less than 1 acre (0.40 ha)
- Built: 1908
- Architect: Benton Steele, Cameron Watt
- Architectural style: True-circular barn
- MPS: Round and Polygonal Barns of Indiana MPS
- NRHP reference No.: 93000189
- Added to NRHP: April 2, 1993

The Rebecca Rankin Round Barn is a historic round barn in the far eastern part of the U.S. state of Indiana. Located along State Road 18 in far northern Jay County, the barn is one of many built throughout the state during the late nineteenth and early twentieth centuries. Its distinctive manner of construction has resulted in its designation as a historic site.

== Round barns in Indiana ==
Due to the invention of circular silos with elevators by 1882, round barns began to become practical in the late nineteenth century. Trade magazines soon began to make this technology more widely known, and farmers began to embrace this technology by building their barns around their silos. Moreover, farmers found that circular barns were more efficient, because they had no need to walk from end to end of the building multiple times when feeding their animals. As farmers and professors at land-grant universities in different states began to advocate the construction of round barns, Indiana farmers became aware of this trend; 152 round barns were constructed in the state between 1889 and 1936, of which 77 survived into the 1990s.

== Rankin Barn ==
The Rankin Barn was constructed under the leadership of Benton Steele and Cameron Watt in 1908, at the height of the round-barn building period. A simple wooden vernacular structure with windows in its peak and an adjacent silo, it lies along State Road 18 in northeastern Penn Township, east of Fiat and northeast of Pennville. One other round barn was constructed in Jay County; known as the Holdcraft Round Barn, it was built in 1913 along the present State Road 1. In 1985, Indiana state historic preservation officials surveyed the entirety of Jay County to record historic buildings in communities and in rural areas; the Rankin Barn was one of nearly 750 places in the county to be deemed historic, but one of only 82 to receive the highest rank, that of "outstanding."

In 1993, the Rankin Barn was listed on the National Register of Historic Places. Although the 1985 survey's definition of "outstanding" included possible eligibility for inclusion on the Register, the Rankin Barn is one of only eight Jay County locations to be accorded this distinction.
