= Pike Township, Jay County, Indiana =

Pike Township
- Township
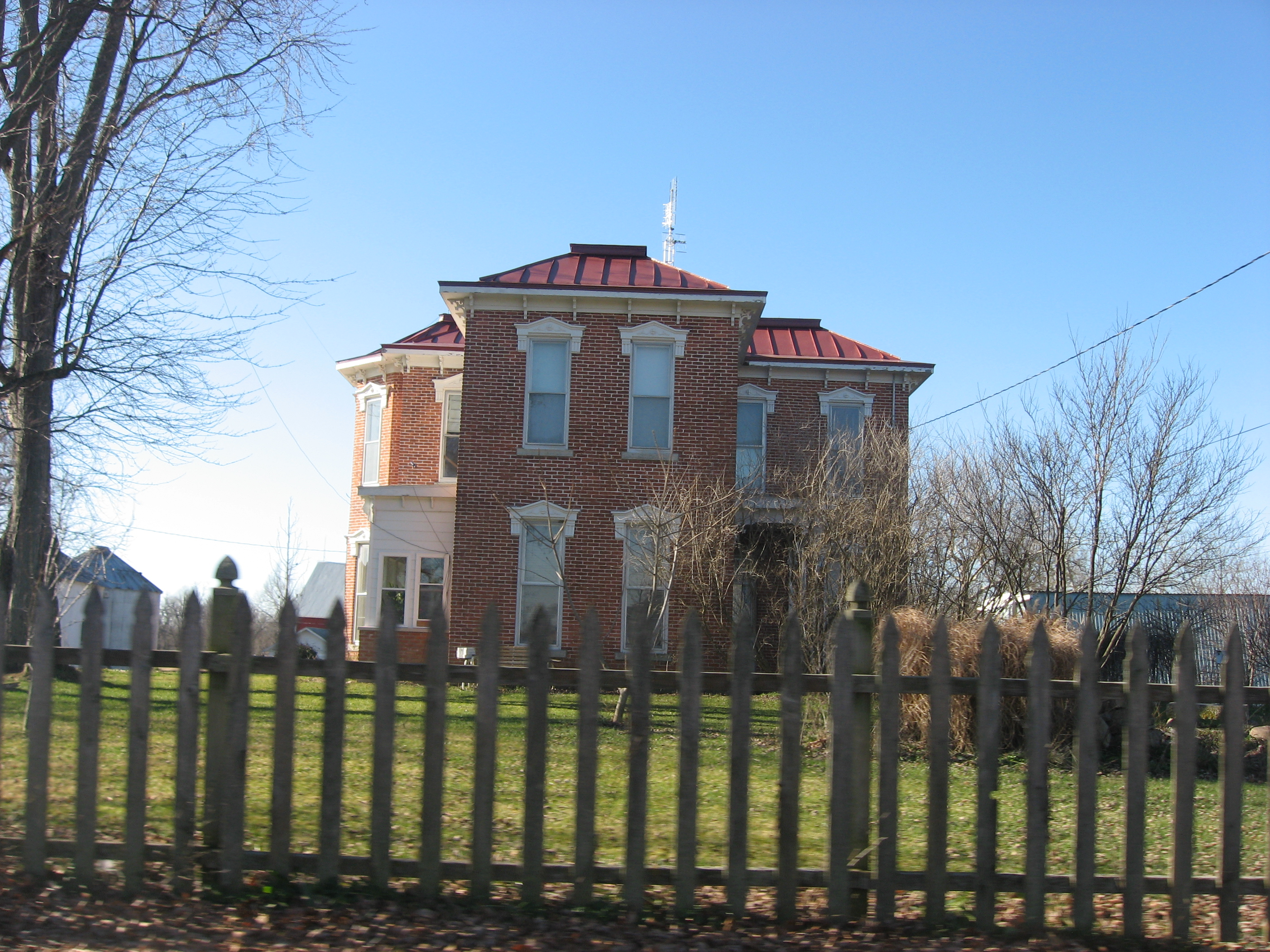
- The James Haines Farm, a historic site in the township

- Location in Jay County
- Coordinates: 40°20′54″N 84°57′41″W
- Country: United States
- State: Indiana
- County: Jay

Government
  - Type: Indiana township

Area
  - Total: 37.29 sq mi (96.6 km^{2})
  - Land: 37.27 sq mi (96.5 km^{2})
  - Water: 0.01 sq mi (0.026 km^{2}) 0.03%
- Elevation: 991 ft (302 m)

Population (2020)
  - Total: 828
  - Density: 22.2/sq mi (8.58/km^{2})
- GNIS feature ID: 0453734

Pike Township is one of twelve townships in Jay County, Indiana, United States. As of the 2020 census, its population was 828 (down from 899 at 2010) and it contained 342 housing units.

== History ==
Pike Township was organized in 1837.

The James Haines Farm was listed on the National Register of Historic Places in 2000.

== Geography ==
According to the 2010 census, the township has a total area of 37.29 square miles (96.6 km^{2}), of which 37.27 square miles (96.5 km^{2}) (or 99.95%) is land and 0.01 square miles (0.026 km^{2}) (or 0.03%) is water. The streams of Buckeye Creek, Buckeye Creek, Old Run, Rest Run and Sale Run run through this township. The Goshen Creek also runs through this township.

=== Unincorporated towns ===
- Antioch
- Bluff Point
- Boundary City
- Collett

=== Adjacent townships ===
- Wayne Township (north)
- Noble Township (northeast)
- Madison Township (east)
- Jackson Township, Randolph County (southeast)
- Ward Township, Randolph County (south)
- Franklin Township, Randolph County (southwest)
- Jefferson Township (west)
- Greene Township (northwest)

=== Cemeteries ===
The township contains seven cemeteries, 3 of which still operate- in operation- Antioch Cemetery, Boundary Cemetery and Zoar Cemetery. Non operated cemeteries are Clark Family Burial Ground, Hawkins Cemetery, Kunce Cemetery, and an unnamed cemetery on land owned by Margaret R. Warren c/o Robin Khayyata, according to the public record.

=== Major highways ===
- US 27
