= College Corner =

College Corner may refer to:

- College Corner, Ohio, a town located partially in Butler and Preble Counties, Ohio
- West College Corner, Indiana (also known as simply "College Corner"), a town in Union County, Indiana, adjacent to College Corner, Ohio
- College Corner, Jay County, Indiana
- College Corner, Wayne County, Indiana

== See also ==
- Coolidge Corner, an intersection of Beacon St. and Harvard Avenue in Brookline, Massachusetts
  - Coolidge Corner (MBTA station), a streetcar station located in Brookline, Massachusetts.
