= Penn Township, Indiana =

Penn Township is the name of three townships in Indiana:

- Penn Township, Jay County, Indiana
- Penn Township, Parke County, Indiana
- Penn Township, St. Joseph County, Indiana
