= Salamonia, Indiana =

- Town
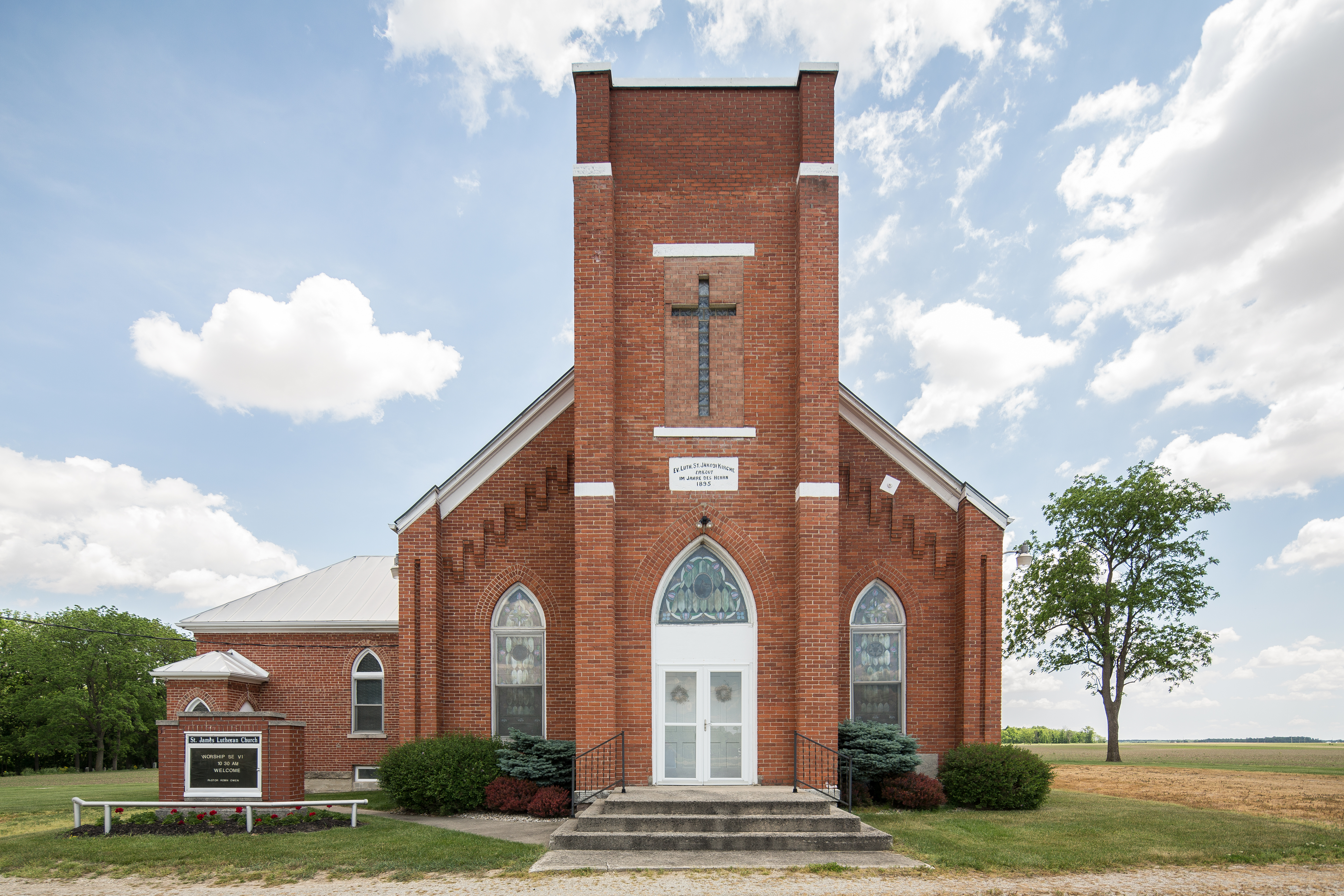

- Location of Salamonia in Jay County, Indiana.
- Coordinates: 40°23′09″N 84°51′54″W
- Country: United States
- State: Indiana
- County: Jay
- Township: Madison
- Established: 1839
- Incorporated: 1867

Area
  - Total: 0.73 sq mi (1.90 km^{2})
  - Land: 0.73 sq mi (1.90 km^{2})
  - Water: 0 sq mi (0.00 km^{2})
- Elevation: 968 ft (295 m)

Population (2020)
  - Total: 151
  - Estimate (2025): 150 ▼
  - Density: 206.0/sq mi (79.54/km^{2})
- Time zone: UTC-5 (Eastern (EST))
  - Summer (DST): UTC-4 (EDT)
- ZIP code: 47381
- Area code: 260
- FIPS code: 18-67302
- GNIS feature ID: 2396902
- Website: jayregion.com/town-of-salamonia

Salamonia is a town in Madison Township, Jay County, Indiana, United States. The population was 151 at the 2020 census. The town is situated along the Salamonie River, near its headwaters in Northern Indiana.

== History ==
Salamonia was originally called Lancaster, and under the latter name was platted in 1839. When the first post office was established there, it was discovered there was another Lancaster, Indiana, and the town was renamed Salamonia, in order to avoid repetition. Salamonia was incorporated as a town in March 1867.

== Geography ==
According to the 2010 census, Salamonia has a total area of 0.37 square miles (0.96 km^{2}), all land.

== Demographics ==
Historical population
Census	Pop.	Note	%±
1880	133		—
1890	150		12.8%
1900	168		12.0%
1910	169		0.6%
1920	194		14.8%
1930	180		−7.2%
1940	191		6.1%
1950	181		−5.2%
1960	142		−21.5%
1970	162		14.1%
1980	147		−9.3%
1990	138		−6.1%
2000	158		14.5%
2010	157		−0.6%
2020	151		−3.8%
2025 (est.)	150	▼	−0.7%
U.S. Decennial Census

=== 2010 census ===
As of the census of 2010, there were 157 people, 52 households, and 40 families living in the town. The population density was 424.3 inhabitants per square mile (163.8/km^{2}). There were 61 housing units at an average density of 164.9 per square mile (63.7/km^{2}). The racial makeup of the town was 98.7% White, 0.6% Native American, and 0.6% from two or more races. Hispanic or Latino of any race were 0.6% of the population.

There were 52 households, of which 42.3% had children under the age of 18 living with them, 61.5% were married couples living together, 13.5% had a female householder with no husband present, 1.9% had a male householder with no wife present, and 23.1% were non-families. 19.2% of all households were made up of individuals, and 5.8% had someone living alone who was 65 years of age or older. The average household size was 3.02 and the average family size was 3.50.

The median age in the town was 30.5 years. 33.8% of residents were under the age of 18; 9% were between the ages of 18 and 24; 22.9% were from 25 to 44; 26.8% were from 45 to 64; and 7.6% were 65 years of age or older. The gender makeup of the town was 49.7% male and 50.3% female.

=== 2000 census ===
As of the census of 2000, there were 158 people, 57 households, and 47 families living in the town. The population density was 429.9 inhabitants per square mile (166.0/km^{2}). There were 58 housing units at an average density of 157.8 per square mile (60.9/km^{2}). The racial makeup of the town was 98.73% White, 0.63% Asian, and 0.63% from two or more races. Hispanic or Latino of any race were 0.63% of the population.

There were 57 households, out of which 43.9% had children under the age of 18 living with them, 71.9% were married couples living together, 10.5% had a female householder with no husband present, and 15.8% were non-families. 14.0% of all households were made up of individuals, and 7.0% had someone living alone who was 65 years of age or older. The average household size was 2.77 and the average family size was 3.04.

In the town, the population was spread out, with 31.6% under the age of 18, 7.0% from 18 to 24, 29.7% from 25 to 44, 26.6% from 45 to 64, and 5.1% who were 65 years of age or older. The median age was 35 years. For every 100 females, there were 95.1 males. For every 100 females age 18 and over, there were 92.9 males.

The median income for a household in the town was $36,458, and the median income for a family was $46,250. Males had a median income of $30,313 versus $25,313 for females. The per capita income for the town was $11,734. About 16.2% of families and 16.1% of the population were below the poverty line, including 28.8% of those under the age of eighteen and 66.7% of those 65 or over.
