= Balbec =

Balbec may refer to:

- Baalbek, Lebanon, known in antiquity as Heliopolis
- Balbec, Indiana, a small town in the US
- Balbec, France, a fictional town in Marcel Proust's In Search of Lost Time, modeled after Cabourg, France
- Balbec, a clothing line by K'Maro
