= Cincinnati, Bluffton and Chicago Railroad =

Overview
- Locale: Indiana
- Dates of operation: 1903–1917

Technical
- Track gauge: Standard

The Cincinnati, Bluffton and Chicago Railroad (CB&C) was a short-lived United States shortline railroad that operated in Indiana from 1903 until 1917. Although the railroad aspired to trunk-line status, it was unable to achieve sufficient financing to provide service to two of the three municipalities mentioned in its corporate name. It operated a 52-mile (84 km) route on a northwest to southeast alignment from Huntington to Portland, via Bluffton and Pennville.

== History ==
=== Growth ===
The CB&C was incorporated under the laws of Indiana in 1903, to build a bridge line between Union City and Huntington. At the former place, it would have connected with the Dayton and Union Railroad from Dayton, Ohio which belonged to the Cincinnati, Hamilton and Dayton Railway and which would have provided the route to Cincinnati. At the latter place, it connected with the Erie Railroad to Chicago. The company had its offices in Huntington. The complete line would have been 75 miles (121 km) long.

The portion from Bluffton to Pennville was opened in 1903, from Pennville to Portland in 1904, and from Bluffton to Huntington in 1908. In that same year, the company became insolvent and a receiver was appointed. Construction was in hand on the section from Bluffton to Union City, but this was never completed.

However the company obtained useful minerals traffic revenue by opening a pair of spurs, one of two miles (3.2 km) from Pennville to a gravel pit, and the other of a mile (1.6 km) from Markle to a stone quarry.

=== Decline ===
In 1910, the receiver defaulted on promissory notes that he had issued and, as a result, the company was foreclosed and the railroad ordered to be sold at auction at a minimum price of $800 000. After no bids at this price were received, in 1912 a new company entitled the Huntington, Richmond and Hamilton Railway was formed to take over the line, but this did not proceed. This was an electric Interurban proposal, which would have completed the unfinished line to Union City and extended on new track to Richmond.

The CB&C's financial condition worsened significantly with a pair of accidents in 1913. On May 22, 1913, a freight train fully loaded with masonry stone was passing over one of the small railroad's key assets, a trestle bridge over the Wabash River at Bluffton, when the overburdened span collapsed. The mishap threw the steam locomotive into the river, killing the engine driver.

Later that year on December 13, a crew had braked one of the railroad's remaining steam locomotives for the night at the short line's northern terminus, Huntington. The track apparently sloped and the locomotive slipped its brake and ran away after working hours. Overshooting the CB&C's trackage stub, the power unit crossed a downtown street and buried itself in the plate-glass front window of a small downtown grocery store. There were no known casualties. A photograph of the incident survives.

As these incidents were taking place, the railroad significantly cut back its use of steam power on its passenger services, replacing loco-hauled trains with gasoline-powered railcars after 1912. In 1915, it possessed four of these.

In 1914, the company was sold for $350,000 to a syndicate of creditors, the receiver continuing operations until no more cash was forthcoming from them. In the event, the railroad was finally abandoned in 1917 and its rails torn up.

== Route ==
From Union City, the unfinished portion of the railroad would have passed through New Pittsburg and Antioch.

From Portland, passenger stations were at Corkwell, Pennville, Balbec, Nottingham, Petroleum, Reffsburg, Bluffton, Murray, Uniondale, Markle and Huntington.

The railroad ran closely parallel to the Erie Railroad's main line between Uniondale and Huntington, and used the passenger station facilities of the Erie Railroad at Uniondale and Markle.

== Equipment ==
In 1908, the railroad had four locomotives, three passenger cars and 91 freight cars. In 1915 it still had four locos and also had four cars for passengers, but its freight car fleet had gone down to 36.
