= Wayne Township, Jay County, Indiana =

Wayne Township
- Township
- Location in Jay County
- Coordinates: 40°26′10″N 84°57′35″W
- Country: United States
- State: Indiana
- County: Jay

Area
  - Total: 37.14 sq mi (96.2 km^{2})
  - Land: 37.14 sq mi (96.2 km^{2})
  - Water: 0 sq mi (0 km^{2}) 0%
- Elevation: 902 ft (275 m)

Population (2020)
  - Total: 7,987
  - Density: 215.1/sq mi (83.03/km^{2})
- GNIS feature ID: 0454033

Wayne Township is one of twelve townships in Jay County, Indiana, United States. As of the 2020 census, its population was 7,987 (up from 7,918 at 2010) and it contained 3,748 housing units.

== History ==
Wayne Township was organized in 1837.

Floral Hall was listed on the National Register of Historic Places in 1983.

== Geography ==
According to the 2010 census, the township has a total area of 37.14 square miles (96.2 km^{2}), all land. The streams of Butternut Creek, Elm Brook, Golf Brook, Hearne Run, Little Salamonie River, Millers Branch, Race Run and Saw Run run through this township.

=== Cities and towns ===
- Portland (the county seat)

=== Unincorporated towns ===
- College Corner
- Liber

=== Adjacent townships ===
- Bearcreek Township (north)
- Noble Township (east)
- Madison Township (southeast)
- Pike Township (south)
- Jefferson Township (southwest)
- Greene Township (west)
- Jackson Township (northwest)

=== Cemeteries ===
The township contains five cemeteries: Green Park, Hearne, Jaque, Liber and Reed.

=== Major highways ===
- US 27
- SR 26
- SR 67

=== Airports and landing strips ===
- Steed Field
