= Bluff Point =

Bluff Point may refer to:

- Bluff Point, Western Australia, a suburb of Geraldton
- Bluff Point State Park, Connecticut, United States
- Bluff Point, Indiana, United States, an unincorporated community
- Bluff Point (South Georgia)
- Bluff Point, Keuka Lake, New York, United States, location of the prehistoric Bluff Point Stoneworks
