= Bearcreek Township, Jay County, Indiana =

Bearcreek Township
- Township
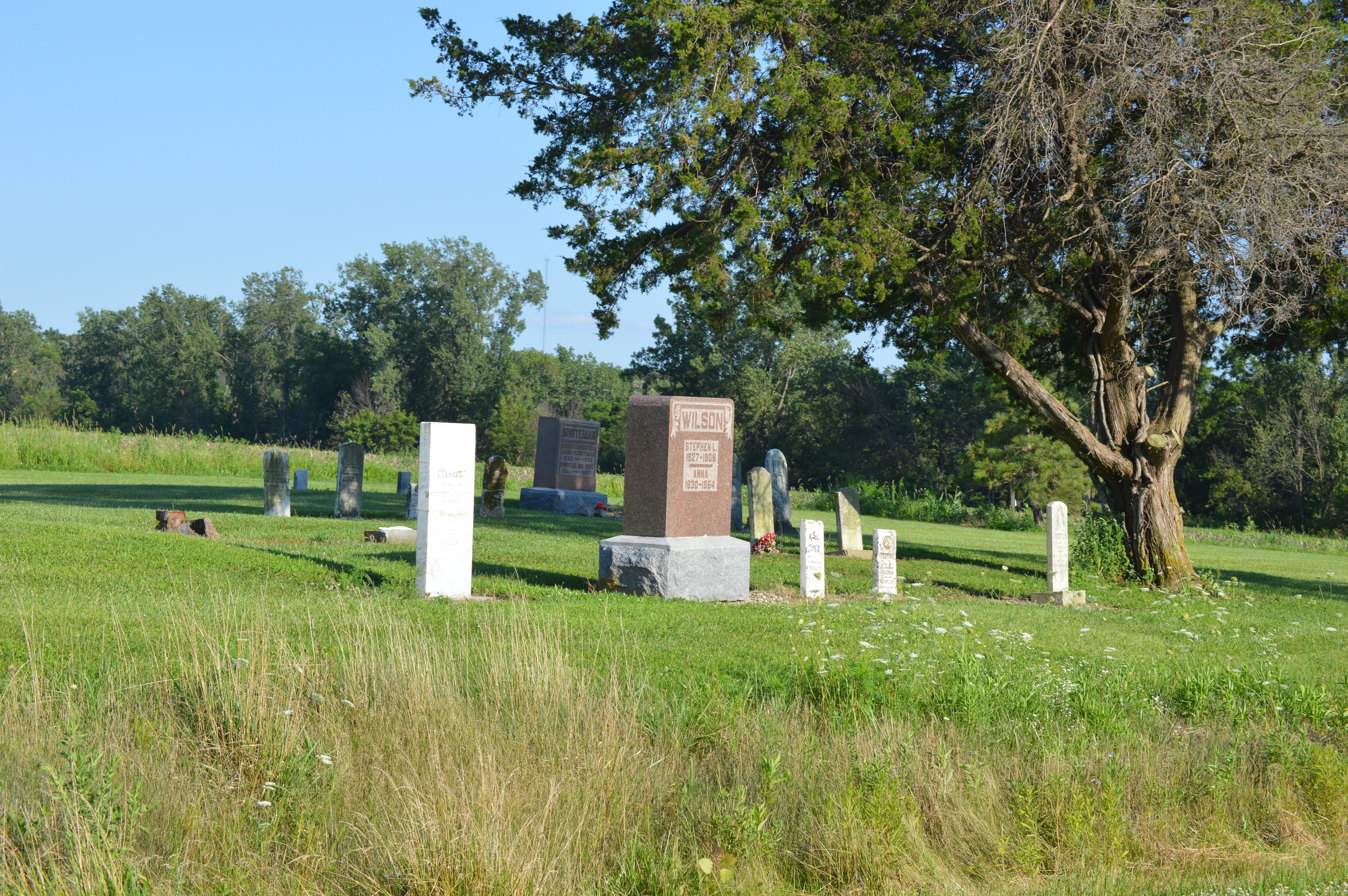
- Small cemetery east of Bryant

- Location in Jay County
- Coordinates: 40°31′35″N 84°55′51″W
- Country: United States
- State: Indiana
- County: Jay

Government
  - Type: Indiana township

Area
  - Total: 36.25 sq mi (93.9 km^{2})
  - Land: 36.23 sq mi (93.8 km^{2})
  - Water: 0.01 sq mi (0.026 km^{2}) 0.03%
- Elevation: 863 ft (263 m)

Population (2020)
  - Total: 1,587
  - Density: 43.80/sq mi (16.91/km^{2})
- GNIS feature ID: 0453101

Historical population
Census	Pop.	Note	%±
1940	1,297		—
1950	1,219		−6.0%
1960	1,133		−7.1%
1970	1,090		−3.8%
1980	1,162		6.6%
1990	1,228		5.7%
2000	1,368		11.4%
2010	1,578		15.4%
2020	1,587		0.6%
US Census:

Bearcreek Township is one of twelve townships in Jay County, Indiana, United States. As of the 2020 census, its population was 1,587 (up from 1,578 at 2010) and it contained 465 housing units.

== History ==
Bearcreek Township was organized in 1836.

== Geography ==
According to the 2010 census, the township has a total area of 36.25 square miles (93.9 km^{2}), of which 36.23 square miles (93.8 km^{2}) (or 99.94%) is land and 0.01 square miles (0.026 km^{2}) (or 0.03%) is water. The streams of Deer Creek and Tri Run run through this township.

=== Cities and towns ===
- Bryant

=== Unincorporated towns ===
- Bloomfield
- Pleasant Ridge
- Westchester

=== Adjacent townships ===
- Wabash Township, Adams County (north)
- Jefferson Township, Adams County (northeast)
- Wabash Township (east)
- Noble Township (southeast)
- Wayne Township (south)
- Jackson Township (west)
- Hartford Township, Adams County (northwest)

=== Cemeteries ===
The township contains three cemeteries: Borris, Old Baptist and Pingrey.

=== Major highways ===
- US 27
- SR 18
- SR 67
