= Liber College =

Liber College was a short-lived school located in Liber, Indiana, just south of Portland. It was founded in 1853, funded by $20 shares, and opened that fall in a building constructed for the school. The first head of the college was I. N. Taylor, who had proposed creation of a school at the founding meeting and who was one of the donors of the land on which it was built. The name of the school was taken from the Latin. Both male and female students were taught, but at the collegiate and primary levels; in the 1860-'61 school year 156 students were enrolled. In 1864 the school moved to a new building, the old being perchased by the township for a primary school. A dispute over the enrollment of colored students led to the establishment of the nearby Farmer's Academy in 1854; it was taken over by the local Methodist conference in 1859 and was closed in 1865; two years later its building was sold to the township. Liber College itself closed in 1873 or 1880.
