= Antioch, Indiana =

Antioch is the name of the following places in the U.S. state of Indiana:

- Antioch, Clinton County, Indiana
- Antioch, Jay County, Indiana
