= New Mount Pleasant, Indiana =

- Unincorporated community
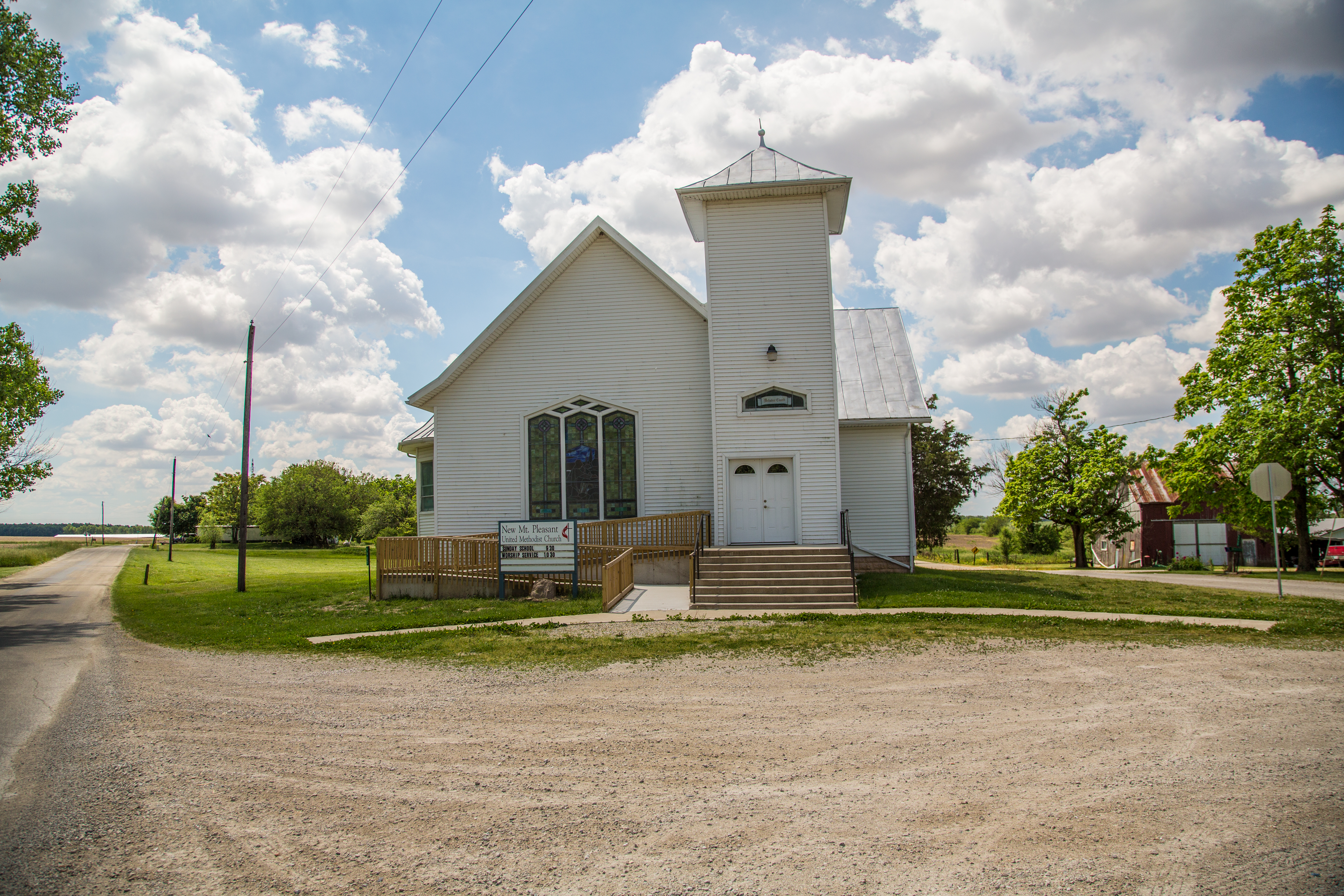

- Location within Indiana Location within the United States
- Coordinates: 40°21′21″N 85°03′54″W
- Country: United States
- State: Indiana
- County: Jay
- Township: Jefferson
- Elevation: 1,034 ft (315 m)
- ZIP code: 47371
- FIPS code: 18-53316
- GNIS feature ID: 440088

New Mount Pleasant is an unincorporated community in Jefferson Township, Jay County, Indiana.

== History ==
New Mount Pleasant was founded in 1838. The community was named after a Friends meeting house in Mount Pleasant, Ohio. A post office was established at New Mount Pleasant in 1839, and remained in operation until it was discontinued in 1907.
