= Lancaster, Indiana =

Lancaster is the name of the following places in the U.S. state of Indiana:

- Lancaster, Huntington County, Indiana
- Lancaster, Jefferson County, Indiana
- Patricksburg, Indiana, also called Lancaster

== See also ==
- Lancaster Park, Indiana, an unincorporated community in Monroe County
- Lancaster Township, Indiana (disambiguation)
- New Lancaster, Indiana, an unincorporated community in Tipton County
