= Bellfountain, Indiana =

- Unincorporated community
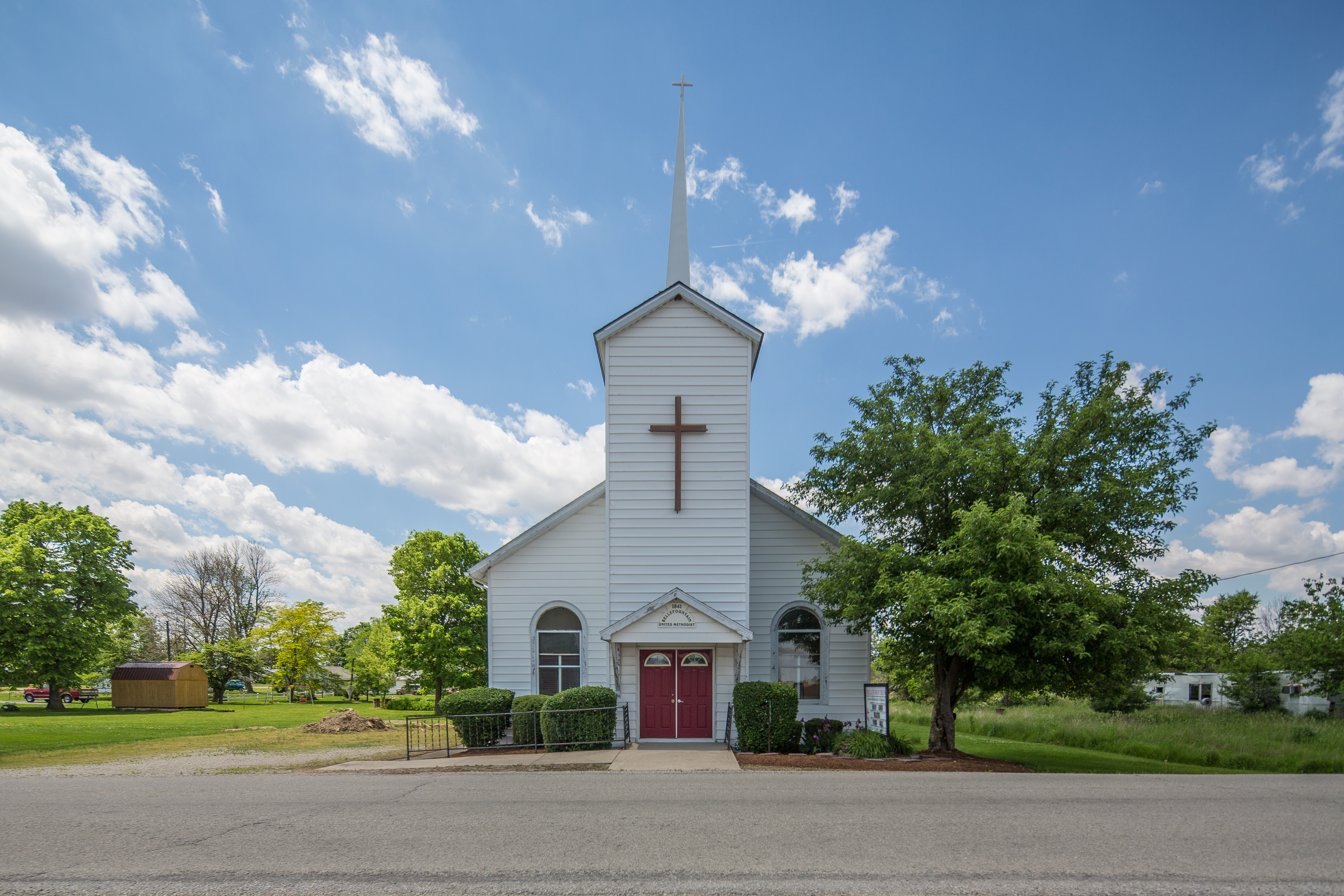

- Location within Indiana Location within the United States
- Coordinates: 40°26′00″N 84°51′49″W
- Country: United States
- State: Indiana
- County: Jay
- Township: Noble
- Elevation: 951 ft (290 m)
- Time zone: UTC-5 (Eastern (EST))
  - Summer (DST): UTC-4 (EDT)
- ZIP code: 47371
- GNIS feature ID: 430777

Bellfountain is an unincorporated community in Noble Township, Jay County, in the U.S. state of Indiana.

== History ==
The community may be named after Bellefontaine, Ohio. An old variant name of the community was called Hector.
