= Como, Indiana =

- Unincorporated community
- Location within Indiana Location within the United States
- Coordinates: 40°23′07″N 85°05′13″W
- Country: United States
- State: Indiana
- County: Jay
- Township: Jefferson
- Elevation: 942 ft (287 m)
- ZIP code: 47371
- FIPS code: 18-14806
- GNIS feature ID: 432837

Como is an unincorporated community in Jefferson Township, Jay County, Indiana.

== History ==
A post office was established at Como in 1882, and remained in operation until it was discontinued in 1904. The name of the community was likely borrowed from Como, in Italy.
