= West Liberty, Jay County, Indiana =

Unincorporated community in Indiana, U.S.

West Liberty, Indiana
- Unincorporated community
- Location within Indiana Location within the United States
- Coordinates: 40°32′0.24″N 84°59′45.96″W
- Country: United States
- State: Indiana
- County: Jay
- Township: Jackson
- Elevation: 856 ft (261 m)
- ZIP code: 47326
- GNIS feature ID: 447593

West Liberty is an unincorporated community in Jay County, Indiana, in the United States.

The first post office at West Liberty was established in 1851.
