= Liber, Indiana =

- Unincorporated community
- Location within Indiana Location within the United States
- Coordinates: 40°24′29″N 84°58′10″W
- Country: United States
- State: Indiana
- County: Jay
- Township: Wayne
- Named for: Liber College
- Elevation: 929 ft (283 m)
- ZIP code: 47371
- FIPS code: 18-43182
- GNIS feature ID: 437813

Liber is an unincorporated community in Wayne Township, Jay County, Indiana.

== History ==
Liber was founded in 1853 and named from the presence of Liber College. A post office was established at Liber in 1872, and remained in operation until it was discontinued in 1902.
