= Westchester, Indiana =

- post office
- Location within Indiana Location within the United States
- Coordinates: 40°29′54″N 84°53′42″W
- Country: United States
- State: Indiana
- County: Jay
- Township: Bearcreek
- Elevation: 899 ft (274 m)
- ZIP code: 47371
- FIPS code: 18-82466
- GNIS feature ID: 445827

Westchester was a post office in Bearcreek Township, Jay County, Indiana that was established at Westchester in 1854, and remained in operation until it was discontinued in 1904.
