= Bloomfield, Jay County, Indiana =

- Unincorporated community
- Location within Indiana Location within the United States
- Coordinates: 40°30′42″N 84°58′26″W
- Country: United States
- State: Indiana
- County: Jay
- Township: Bearcreek
- Elevation: 873 ft (266 m)
- ZIP code: 47371
- FIPS code: 18-05734
- GNIS feature ID: 431198

Bloomfield is an unincorporated community in Bearcreek Township, Jay County, Indiana.

== History ==
The first post office in Bearcreek Township was established at Bloomfield in 1840.
