= James Haines Farm =

- U.S. National Register of Historic Places
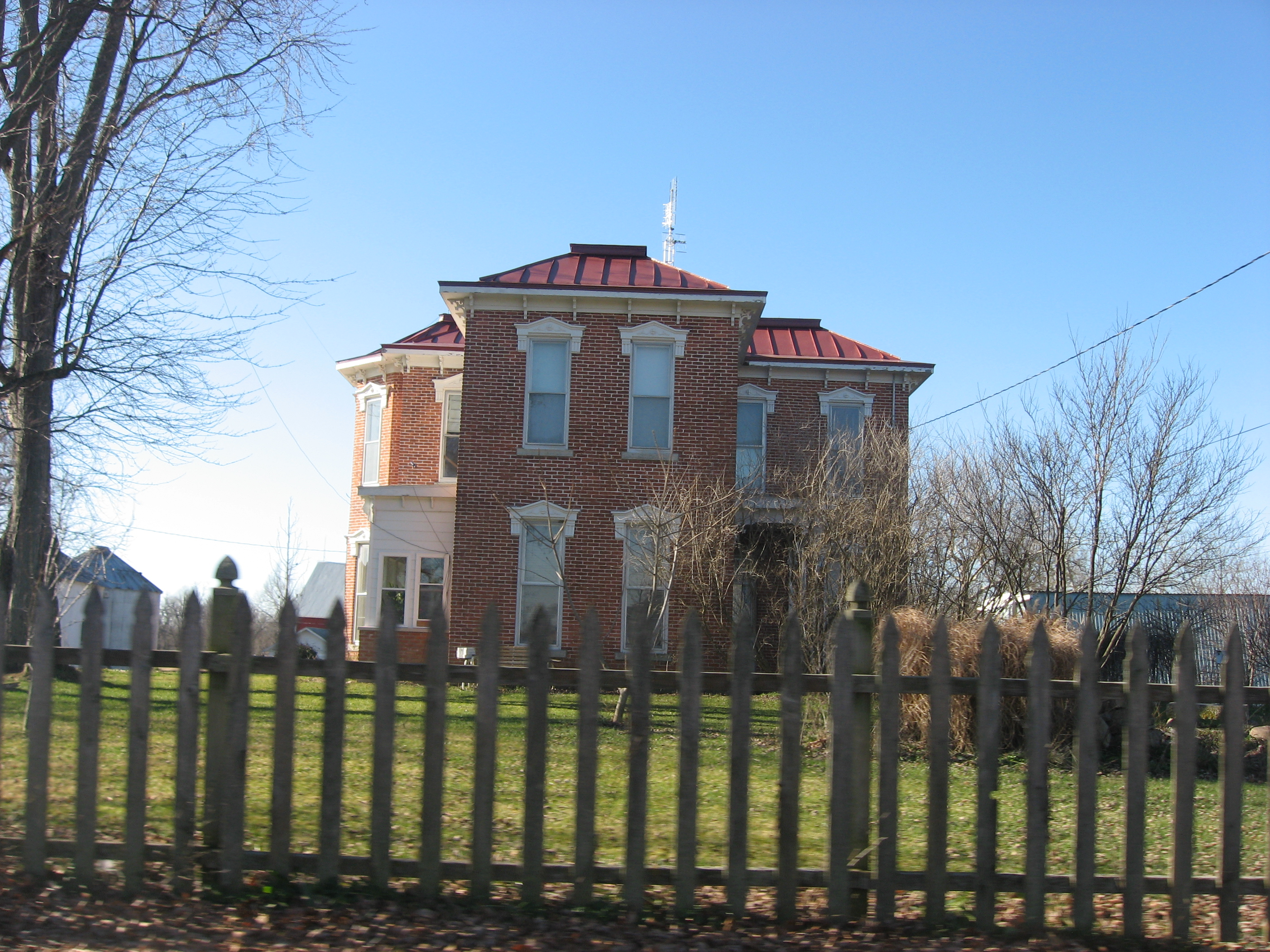
- James Haines Farmhouse, January 2012

- Location within Indiana Location within the United States
- Location: County Road 869E 200S, southeast of Portland in Pike Township, Jay County, Indiana
- Coordinates: 40°23′39″N 84°57′25″W
- Area: 7 acres (2.8 ha)
- Built: 1884
- Architectural style: Italianate
- NRHP reference No.: 00000202
- Added to NRHP: March 15, 2000

James Haines Farm is a historic home and farm located in Pike Township, Jay County, Indiana. The farmhouse was built in 1884, and is a two-story, Italianate style brick dwelling. It sits on a limestone block foundation, has a low pitched hipped roof, and features a five-sided projecting bay. Also on the property are the contributing summer kitchen, utility shed, large stock barn, long poultry house, privy, small stock barn, and a brooder house.

It was listed on the National Register of Historic Places in 2000.
