= Boundary City, Indiana =

- Unincorporated community
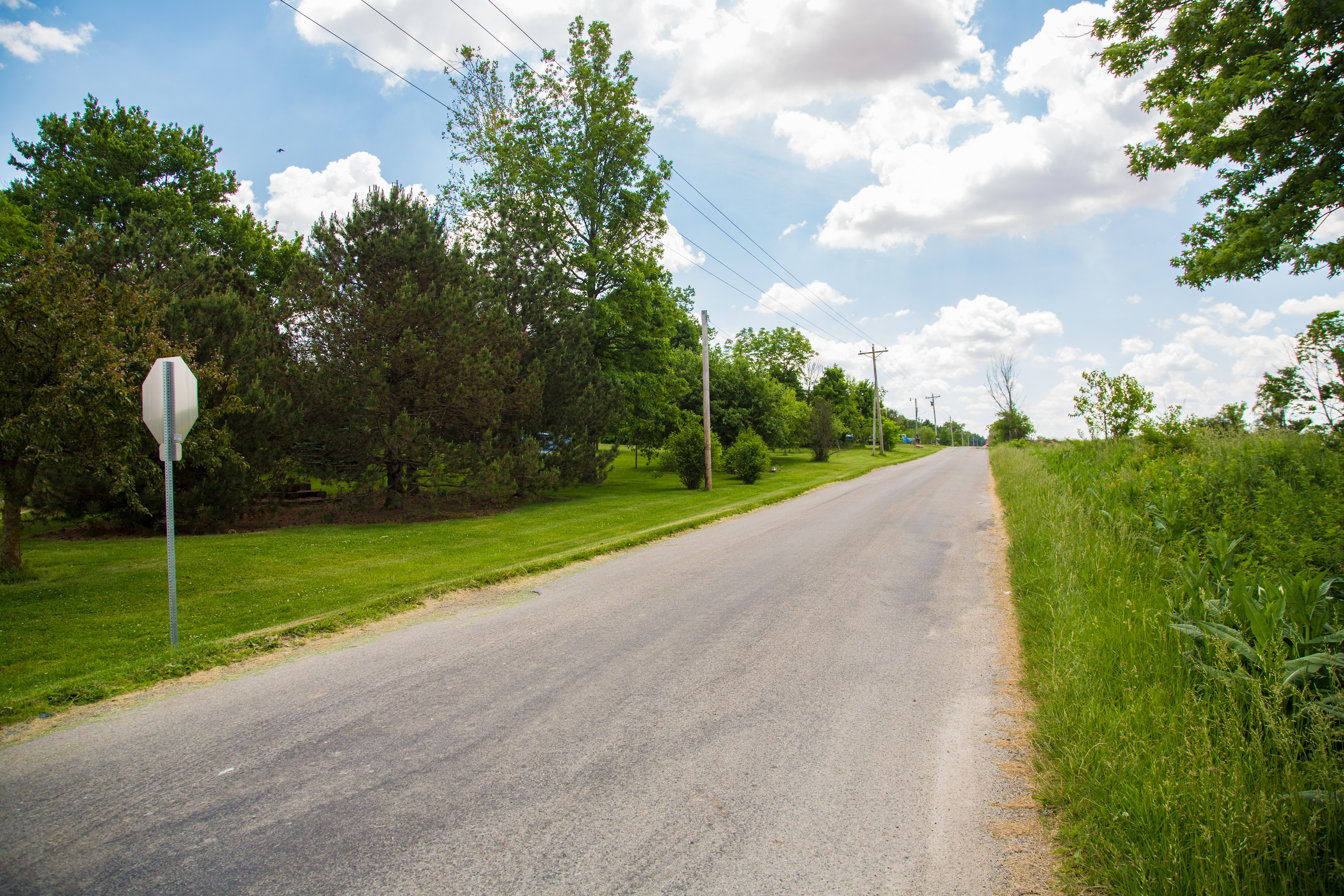

- Location within Indiana Location within the United States
- Coordinates: 40°20′40″N 84°55′19″W
- Country: United States
- State: Indiana
- County: Jay
- Township: Pike
- Elevation: 1,017 ft (310 m)
- Time zone: UTC-5 (Eastern (EST))
  - Summer (DST): UTC-4 (EDT)
- ZIP code: 47371
- GNIS feature ID: 431379

Boundary City is an unincorporated community in Pike Township, Jay County, Indiana, in the United States.

== History ==
A post office was established as Boundary in 1852, and remained in operation until it was discontinued in 1904. The name of the community refers to the nearby boundary of an Indian treaty.
