= Poling, Indiana =

- Unincorporated community
- Location within Indiana Location within the United States
- Coordinates: 40°31′57″N 85°03′12″W
- Country: United States
- State: Indiana
- County: Jay
- Township: Jackson
- Elevation: 863 ft (263 m)
- Time zone: UTC-5 (Eastern (EST))
  - Summer (DST): UTC-4 (EDT)
- Area code: 260
- GNIS feature ID: 441405

Poling is an unincorporated community in Jackson Township, Jay County, Indiana, United States. Poling is 4.7 miles (7.6 km) west of Bryant.

== History ==
A post office was established at Poling in 1887, and remained in operation until it was discontinued in 1907. William Poling served as an early postmaster.
