= Collett, Indiana =

- Unincorporated community
- Location within Indiana Location within the United States
- Coordinates: 40°22′30″N 85°00′01″W
- Country: United States
- State: Indiana
- County: Jay
- Township: Pike
- Elevation: 961 ft (293 m)
- ZIP code: 47371
- FIPS code: 18-14482
- GNIS feature ID: 432778

Collett is an unincorporated community in Pike Township, Jay County, Indiana.

== History ==
Collett was platted in 1872, at the time the railroad was extended to that point. It was named for its founder, John Collett. A post office was established at Collett in 1872, and remained in operation until it was discontinued in 1922.
