= Ridertown, Indiana =

- Unincorporated community
- Location within Indiana Location within the United States
- Coordinates: 40°26′08″N 85°12′23″W
- Country: United States
- State: Indiana
- County: Jay
- Township: Knox
- Elevation: 915 ft (279 m)
- ZIP code: 47336
- FIPS code: 18-64340
- GNIS feature ID: 441989

Ridertown is an unincorporated community in Knox Township, Jay County, Indiana.

== History ==
A post office was established at Ridertown in 1891, and remained in operation until it was discontinued in 1904. The name of the community honors the Rider family.
