= Fiat, Indiana =

- Unincorporated community
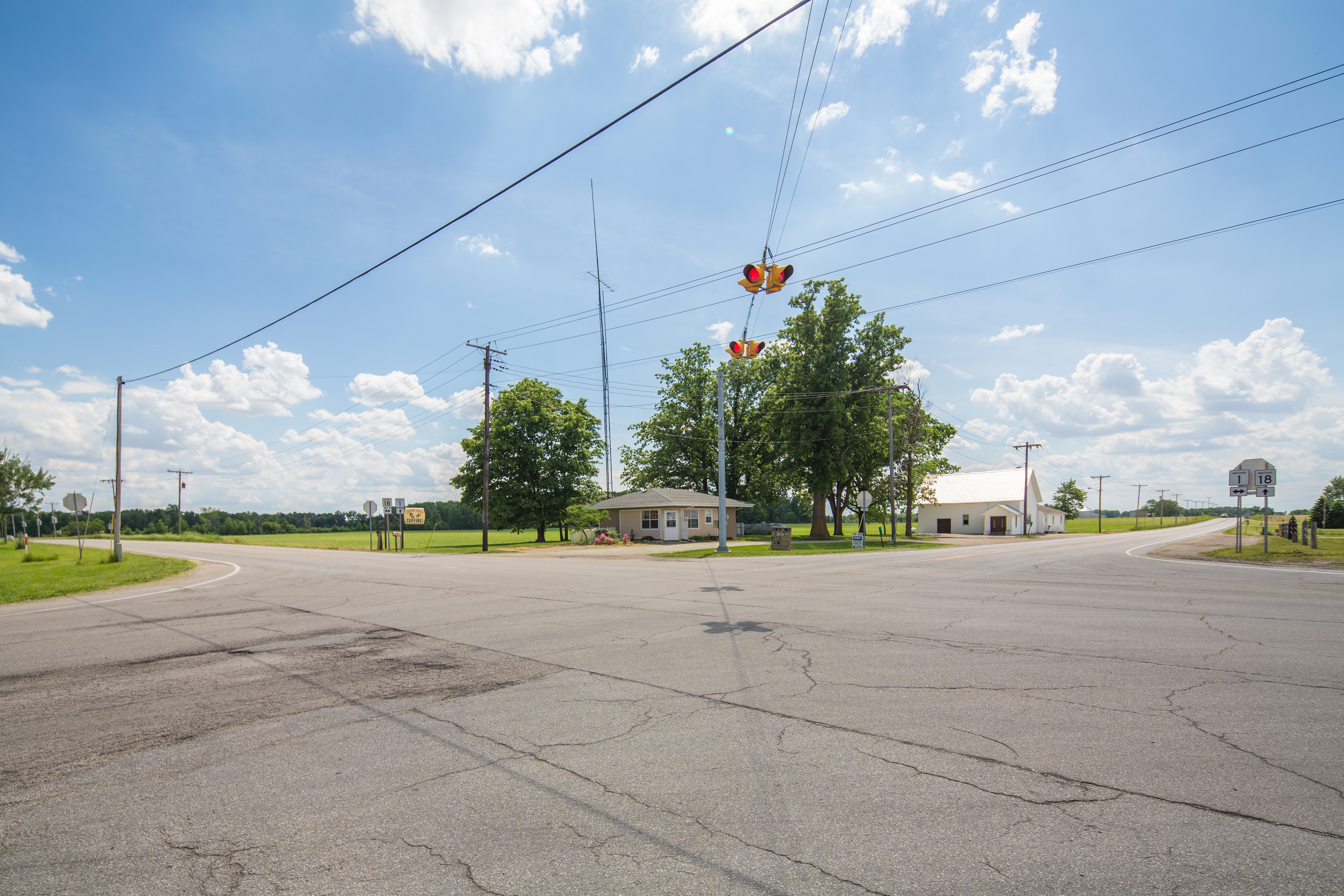

- Location within Indiana Location within the United States
- Coordinates: 40°33′12″N 85°09′00″W
- Country: United States
- State: Indiana
- County: Jay
- Township: Penn Township
- Elevation: 902 ft (275 m)
- FIPS code: 18-23116
- GNIS feature ID: 434469

Fiat is an unincorporated community in Penn Township, Jay County, Indiana.

== History ==
A post office was established at Fiat in 1881, and remained in operation until it was discontinued in 1926. The political issue of United States Notes (fiat money) likely caused the community's name to be selected.

== Historic site ==
Located approximately 2 miles (3.2 km) east of Fiat is a round barn. Known as the Rebecca Rankin Round Barn, it was built in 1908, and it is listed on the National Register of Historic Places.

== Literary reference ==
Jens looked at a map he'd filched from an abandoned gas station. If he was where he thought he was, he'd soon be approaching the grand metropolis of Fiat, by God, Indiana. He managed a smile when he saw that, and declaimed, "And God said, Fiat, Indiana, and there was Indiana."

--Harry Turtledove, Worldwar: In the Balance, New York: Random House (1994), Chapter 14, copyright 1994 by Harry Turtledove. The reference is to the unincorporated town of Fiat near the intersection of Indiana State Routes 1 and 18 in Jay County.
