= Floral Hall (Portland, Indiana) =

- U.S. National Register of Historic Places
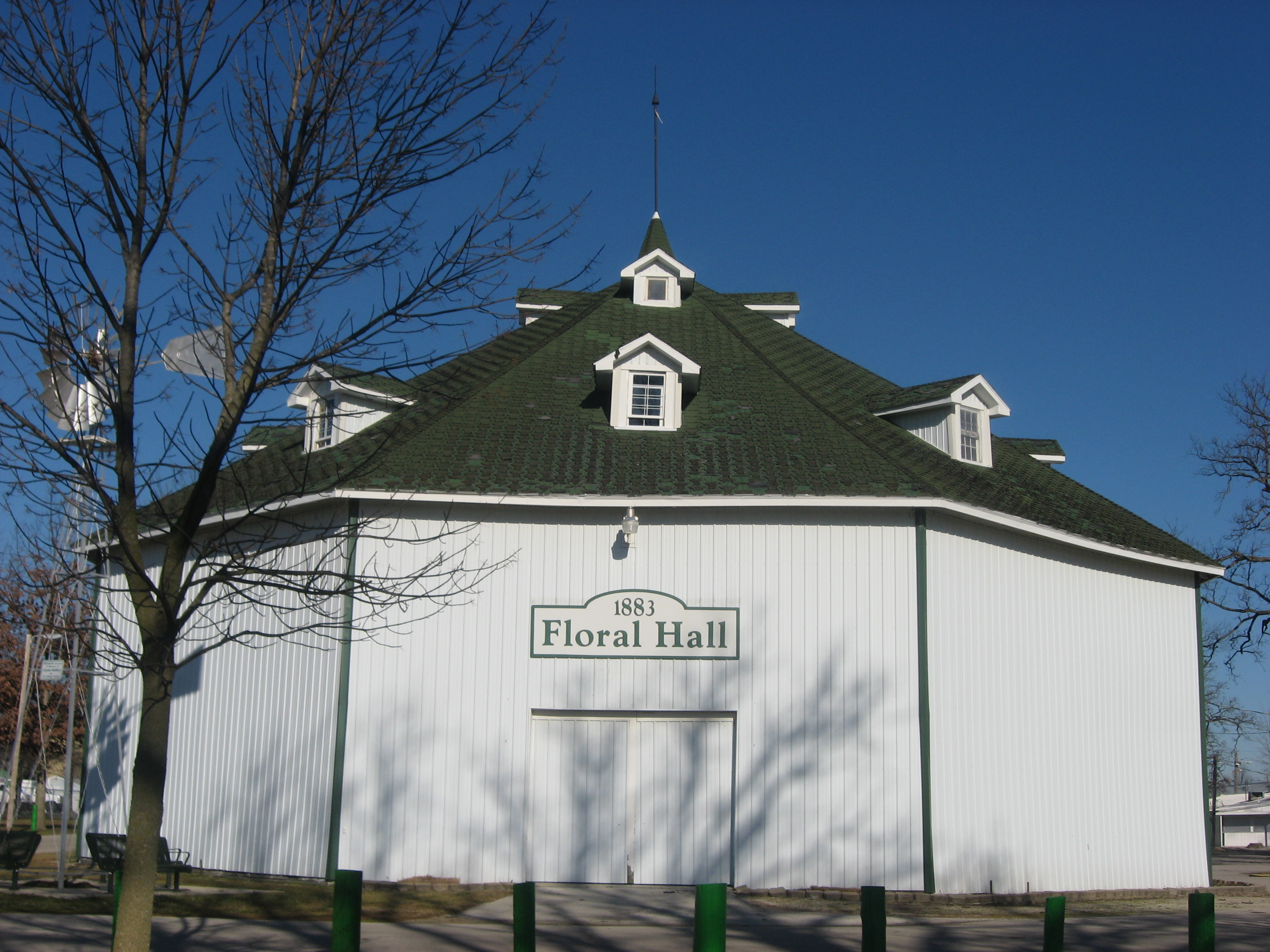
- Floral hall at the Jay County Fairgrounds, January 2012

- Location within Indiana Location within the United States
- Location: W. Votaw and Moton Sts. at the Jay County Fairgrounds, east of Portland, Wayne Township, Jay County, Indiana
- Coordinates: 40°26′29″N 84°58′4″W
- Area: less than one acre
- Built: 1891
- NRHP reference No.: 83000038
- Added to NRHP: September 1, 1983

Floral Hall, also known as The Round House, is a historic building located on the Jay County Fairgrounds in Wayne Township, Jay County, Indiana. It was built in 1891, and is a 2 1/2-story, octagonal frame building with vertical board siding with battens. Each side measures approximately 33 feet long.

It was listed on the National Register of Historic Places in 1983.
