= Salem, Jay County, Indiana =

- Unincorporated community
- Location within Indiana Location within the United States
- Coordinates: 40°18′37″N 84°50′36″W
- Country: United States
- State: Indiana
- County: Jay
- Township: Madison
- Elevation: 1,030 ft (310 m)
- ZIP code: 47390
- FIPS code: 18-67374
- GNIS feature ID: 442874

Salem is an unincorporated community in Madison Township, Jay County, Indiana.

Salem was founded in 1837.
