= Powers, Indiana =

- Unincorporated community
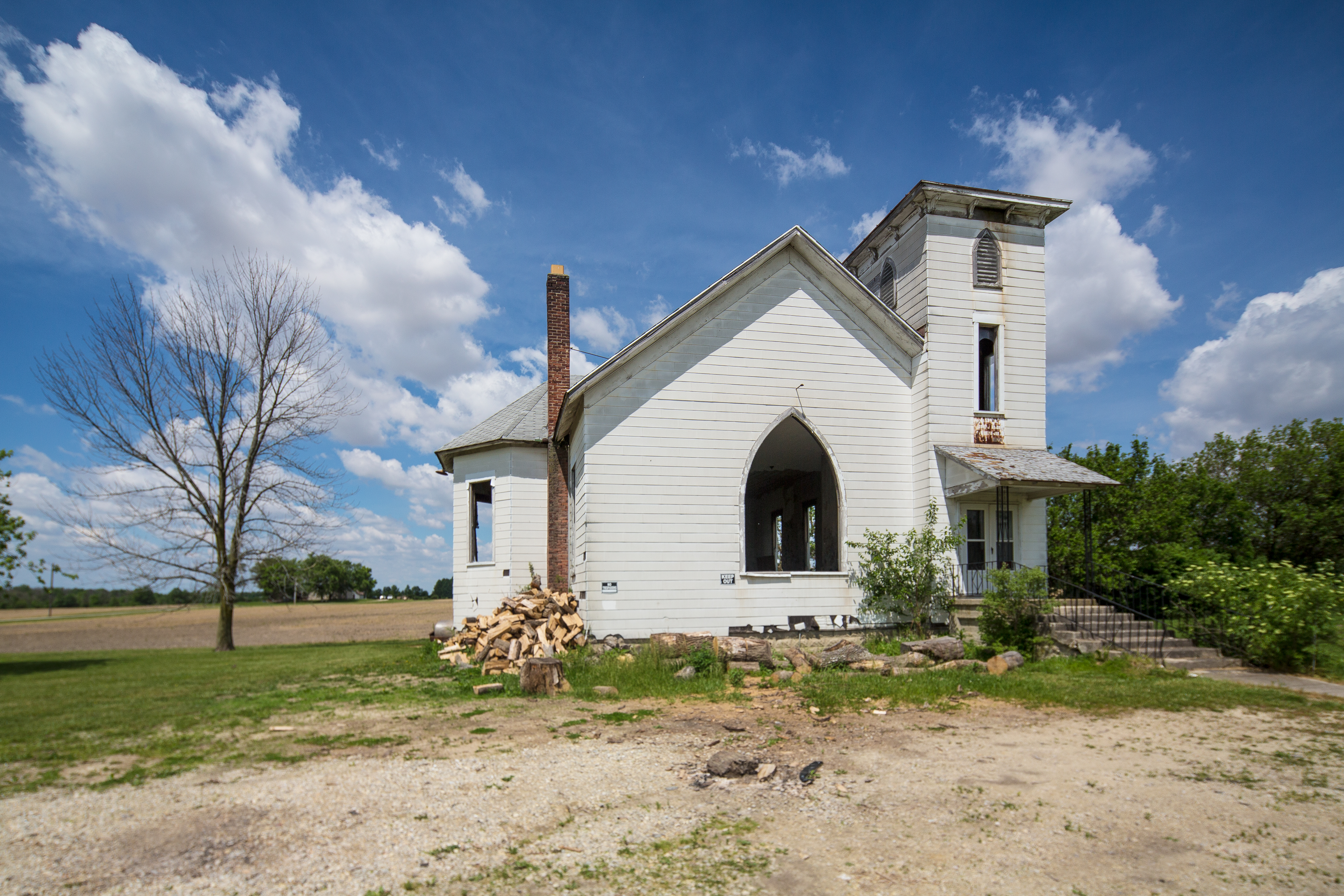

- Location within Indiana Location within the United States
- Coordinates: 40°19′19″N 85°05′33″W
- Country: United States
- State: Indiana
- County: Jay
- Township: Jefferson
- Elevation: 991 ft (302 m)
- ZIP code: 47371
- FIPS code: 18-61542
- GNIS feature ID: 441523

Powers is an unincorporated community in Jefferson Township, Jay County, Indiana.

== History ==
A post office was established at Powers in 1867, and remained in operation until it was discontinued in 1935. Powers was platted in 1868 by Andrew Powers Jr. and named for him.
