= Jefferson Township, Jay County, Indiana =

Jefferson Township
- Township
- Location in Jay County
- Coordinates: 40°21′00″N 85°04′31″W
- Country: United States
- State: Indiana
- County: Jay

Government
  - Type: Indiana township

Area
  - Total: 35.16 sq mi (91.1 km^{2})
  - Land: 35.13 sq mi (91.0 km^{2})
  - Water: 0.03 sq mi (0.078 km^{2}) 0.09%
- Elevation: 991 ft (302 m)

Population (2020)
  - Total: 684
  - Density: 19.5/sq mi (7.52/km^{2})
- GNIS feature ID: 0453488

Jefferson Township is one of twelve townships in Jay County, Indiana, United States. As of the 2020 census, its population was 684 (down from 770 at 2010) and it contained 292 housing units.

== History ==
Jefferson Township was organized in 1837.

== Geography ==
According to the 2010 census, the township has a total area of 35.16 square miles (91.1 km^{2}), of which 35.13 square miles (91.0 km^{2}) (or 99.91%) is land and 0.03 square miles (0.078 km^{2}) (or 0.09%) is water. The streams of Bost Run, Como Run, Jeff Run, Jutte Run, New Mount Run and Vale Run run through this township.

=== Unincorporated towns ===
- Como
- New Mount Pleasant
- Powers

=== Adjacent townships ===
- Greene Township (north)
- Wayne Township (northeast)
- Pike Township (east)
- Ward Township, Randolph County (southeast)
- Franklin Township, Randolph County (south)
- Green Township, Randolph County (southwest)
- Richland Township (west)
- Knox Township (northwest)

=== Cemeteries ===
The township contains seven cemeteries: Bost, Flesher, New Mount Pleasant, Powers, Stephens, Stratton and Wentz.

=== Major highways ===
- SR 67

=== Airports and landing strips ===
- Windy P Ridge Airport
