= Jackson Township, Jay County, Indiana =

Jackson Township
- Township
- Location in Jay County
- Coordinates: 40°31′36″N 85°03′09″W
- Country: United States
- State: Indiana
- County: Jay

Government
  - Type: Indiana township

Area
  - Total: 36.37 sq mi (94.2 km^{2})
  - Land: 36.34 sq mi (94.1 km^{2})
  - Water: 0.02 sq mi (0.052 km^{2}) 0.05%
- Elevation: 873 ft (266 m)

Population (2020)
  - Total: 991
  - Density: 27.3/sq mi (10.5/km^{2})
- GNIS feature ID: 0453452

Historical population
Census	Pop.	Note	%±
1940	884		—
1950	867		−1.9%
1960	708		−18.3%
1970	715		1.0%
1980	829		15.9%
1990	814		−1.8%
2000	866		6.4%
2010	965		11.4%
2020	991		2.7%
US Census:

Jackson Township is one of twelve townships in Jay County, Indiana, United States. As of the 2020 census, its population was 991 (up from 965 at 2010) and it contained 316 housing units.

== History ==
Jackson Township was organized in 1838.

== Geography ==
According to the 2010 census, the township has a total area of 36.37 square miles (94.2 km^{2}), of which 36.34 square miles (94.1 km^{2}) (or 99.92%) is land and 0.02 square miles (0.052 km^{2}) (or 0.05%) is water. The streams of Bear Creek, Dunkirk Drain, Haskin Run, Wall Run and Wolf Creek run through this township.

=== Unincorporated towns ===
- Poling
- West Liberty

=== Adjacent townships ===
- Hartford Township, Adams County (north)
- Wabash Township, Adams County (northeast)
- Bearcreek Township (east)
- Wayne Township (southeast)
- Greene Township (south)
- Penn Township (west)
- Nottingham Township, Wells County (northwest)

=== Cemeteries ===
The township contains one cemetery, Gravel Hill.

=== Major highways ===
- SR 18
