= Knox Township, Jay County, Indiana =

Knox Township
- Township
- Location in Jay County
- Coordinates: 40°26′14″N 85°10′17″W
- Country: United States
- State: Indiana
- County: Jay

Government
  - Type: Indiana township

Area
  - Total: 23.7 sq mi (61 km^{2})
  - Land: 23.7 sq mi (61 km^{2})
  - Water: 0 sq mi (0 km^{2}) 0%
- Elevation: 912 ft (278 m)

Population (2020)
  - Total: 477
  - Density: 20.1/sq mi (7.77/km^{2})
- GNIS feature ID: 0453529

Knox Township is one of twelve townships in Jay County, Indiana, United States. As of the 2020 census, its population was 477 (down from 503 at 2010) and it contained 194 housing units.

== History ==
Knox Township was organized in 1839. It was named after Knox County, Ohio.

== Geography ==
According to the 2010 census, the township has a total area of 23.7 square miles (61 km^{2}), all land. The streams of Bit Run, Corrode Run, Cowboy Run, Crooked Creek, Harris Creek, Holster Creek, Mud Creek, Oak Run, Oval Run, Phillips Run, Rustic Run and Wire Run run through this township.

=== Unincorporated towns ===
- Ridertown

=== Adjacent townships ===
- Penn Township (north)
- Greene Township (east)
- Jefferson Township (southeast)
- Richland Township (south)
- Jackson Township, Blackford County (west)
- Harrison Township, Blackford County (northwest)

=== Cemeteries ===
The township contains one cemetery, Winters.

=== Major highways ===
- SR 1
- SR 26
- SR 167

=== Airports and landing strips ===
- Kesler Field
