= Pennville, Indiana =

- Town
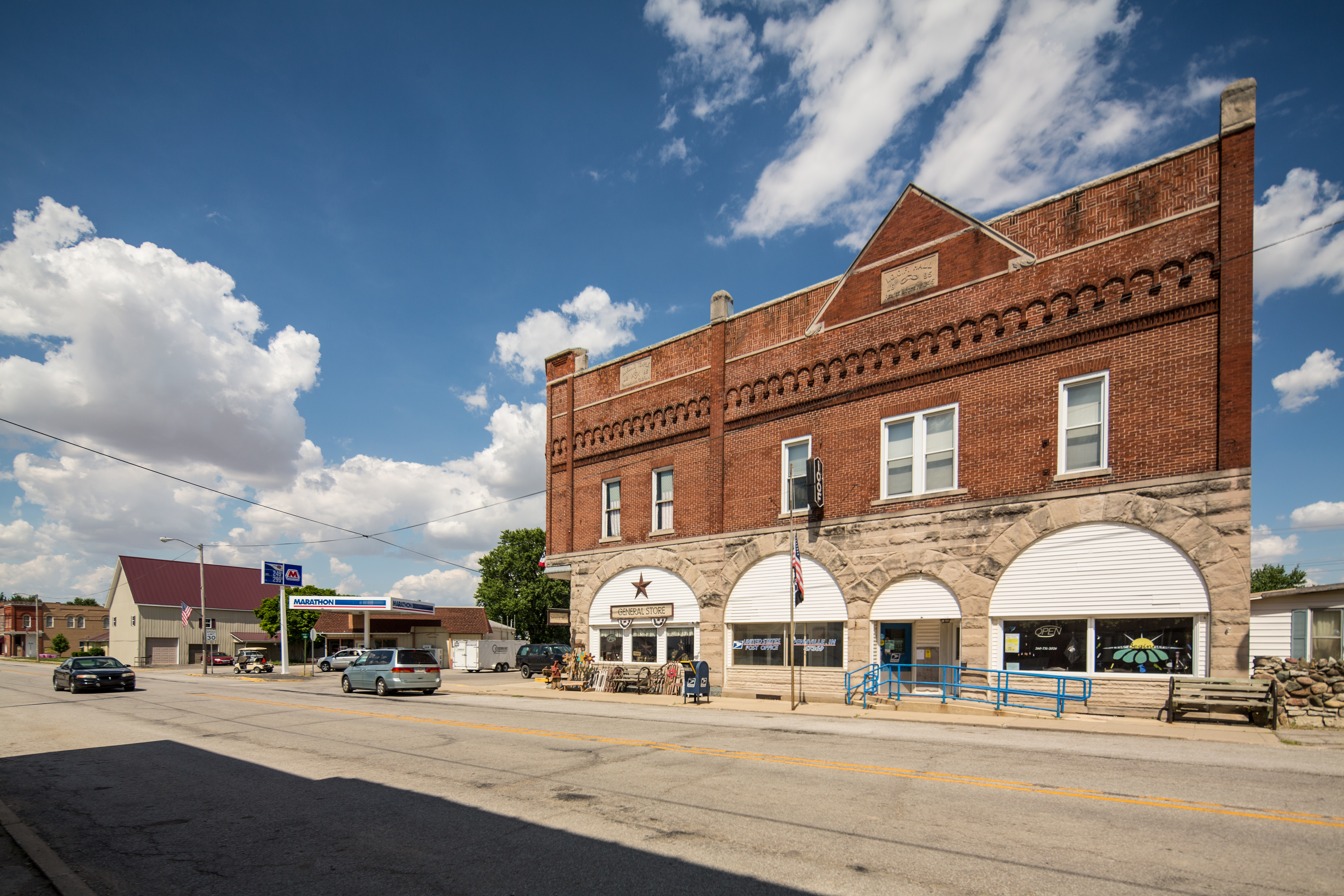
- Downtown Pennville

- Location of Pennville in Jay County, Indiana.
- Coordinates: 40°29′31″N 85°08′49″W
- Country: United States
- State: Indiana
- County: Jay
- Township: Penn

Area
  - Total: 0.50 sq mi (1.29 km^{2})
  - Land: 0.50 sq mi (1.29 km^{2})
  - Water: 0 sq mi (0.00 km^{2})
- Elevation: 879 ft (268 m)

Population (2020)
  - Total: 621
  - Estimate (2025): 613 ▼
  - Density: 1,248.8/sq mi (482.18/km^{2})
- Time zone: UTC-5 (Eastern (EST))
  - Summer (DST): UTC-4 (EDT)
- ZIP code: 47369
- Area code: 260
- FIPS code: 18-58788
- GNIS feature ID: 2396853
- Website: Town of Pennville

Pennville is a town in Penn Township, Jay County, Indiana, United States. The population was 621 at the 2020 census.

== History ==
The history of Pennville began when Samuel Grisell and Moses Hamilton left their homes in Columbiana County, Ohio, in the spring of 1834 to search for government land for a permanent home. Their journey led them to Jay County, Indiana, and on February 10, 1835, Grisell received a Land Patent at the General Land Office at Fort Wayne, purchasing the land "for the North East quarter of Section thirty-five, in Township twenty-four of Range twelve," which contained 160 acres (0.65 km^{2}). Hamilton was the first to move to the new area, and Grisell came shortly thereafter. It is generally accepted, although not proven, that Grisell then platted the land into a town in August 1836, and named it New Lisbon, presumably after the Village of Lisbon in his home county of Columbiana County, Ohio. New Lisbon was short lived and the name of the town changed to Camden around 1837 because there was another town of the same name in Indiana.

Grisell was a member of the Hicksite Quaker faith, mostly country Friends who perceived urban Friends as worldly, a group which split from Orthodox Friends in 1827 due to the views of Elias Hicks. As early as 1841 there were Friends Monthly Meetings in Camden. A post office was established in Camden on January 19, 1839, with John D. Jones as postmaster. The change to the town name of Pennville was gradual and began when the post office was applied for at Camden. Since the new post office could not be called Camden, as that name was already being used by the post office at Camden in Carroll County, Indiana, the new post office was named Penn, allegedly by Grisell, who was a great admirer of William Penn, the famous Quaker. Since Camden no longer existed after an earlier collapse of the corporation, and the post office was named Penn, this caused confusion and more and more the town was called Pennville. The oil and gas boom that began in the 1880s increased business to such an extent that the people felt there should be a legal name for the town. In 1905 a petition was presented to the Jay County Commissioners asking that the town be incorporated under the name of Pennville.

Pennville has had two high schools, the first being organized around 1890 and existing until 1910. The second Pennville High School was built in 1911 on Jones Hill (sometimes called Gregg Hill) and was in session until 1975, when the schools of five Jay County communities – Pennville, Portland, Bryant, Redkey and Dunkirk - were consolidated into Jay County High School, outside Portland.

From 1903 until 1917, the Cincinnati, Bluffton and Chicago Railroad, sometimes referred to as the CB&C, ran through Pennville. Provident Hospital, a precursor to the Caylor-Nickel Clinic in Bluffton, Wells County, Indiana, existed in Pennville from November 1, 1907, until 1917.

== Geography ==
Pennville is located along the Salamonie River.

According to the 2010 census, Pennville has a total area of 0.5 square miles (1.29 km^{2}), all land.

== Demographics ==
Historical population
| Census | Pop. | Note | %± |
|---|---|---|---|
| 1890 | 697 | | — |
| 1900 | 773 | | 10.9% |
| 1910 | 800 | | 3.5% |
| 1920 | 646 | | −19.2% |
| 1930 | 578 | | −10.5% |
| 1940 | 598 | | 3.5% |
| 1950 | 626 | | 4.7% |
| 1960 | 730 | | 16.6% |
| 1970 | 798 | | 9.3% |
| 1980 | 805 | | 0.9% |
| 1990 | 637 | | −20.9% |
| 2000 | 706 | | 10.8% |
| 2010 | 701 | | −0.7% |
| 2020 | 621 | | −11.4% |
| 2025 (est.) | 613 | ▼ | −1.3% |
U.S. Decennial Census

=== 2010 census ===
As of the census of 2010, there were 701 people, 292 households, and 180 families residing in the town. The population density was 1,402.0 inhabitants per square mile (541.3/km^{2}). There were 342 housing units at an average density of 684.0 per square mile (264.1/km^{2}). The racial makeup of the town was 97.1% White, 0.4% Asian, 1.9% from other races, and 0.6% from two or more races. Hispanic or Latino of any race were 3.6% of the population.

There were 292 households, of which 33.6% had children under the age of 18 living with them, 41.4% were married couples living together, 14.7% had a female householder with no husband present, 5.5% had a male householder with no wife present, and 38.4% were non-families. 29.8% of all households were made up of individuals, and 13.4% had someone living alone who was 65 years of age or older. The average household size was 2.40 and the average family size was 2.97.

The median age in the town was 39.6 years. 25.5% of residents were under the age of 18; 7.9% were between the ages of 18 and 24; 22.7% were from 25 to 44; 25.1% were from 45 to 64; and 18.7% were 65 years of age or older. The gender makeup of the town was 47.4% male and 52.6% female.

=== 2000 census ===
As of the census of 2000, there were 706 people, 284 households, and 191 families residing in the town. The population density was 1,800.0 inhabitants per square mile (695.0/km^{2}). There were 316 housing units at an average density of 805.7 per square mile (311.1/km^{2}). The racial makeup of the town was 99.58% White, 0.14% from other races, and 0.28% from two or more races. Hispanic or Latino of any race were 1.27% of the population.

There were 284 households, out of which 32.7% had children under the age of 18 living with them, 51.1% were married couples living together, 10.6% had a female householder with no husband present, and 32.7% were non-families. 26.4% of all households were made up of individuals, and 12.3% had someone living alone who was 65 years of age or older. The average household size was 2.49 and the average family size was 3.01.

In the town, the population was spread out, with 27.2% under the age of 18, 9.1% from 18 to 24, 26.5% from 25 to 44, 21.1% from 45 to 64, and 16.1% who were 65 years of age or older. The median age was 37 years. For every 100 females, there were 96.7 males. For every 100 females age 18 and over, there were 91.1 males.

The median income for a household in the town was $29,688, and the median income for a family was $31,111. Males had a median income of $29,167 versus $21,875 for females. The per capita income for the town was $14,182. About 8.5% of families and 9.4% of the population were below the poverty line, including 11.3% of those under age 18 and 9.3% of those age 65 or over.

== Fire department ==
The Pennville Volunteer Fire Department, Inc. is located at 105 North Washington Street, and is a non-profit domestic corporation created October 23, 1961, the first fire department in the town having been organized in 1919. There is one fire station and approximately 33 volunteers. In 2004, the town received a grant of almost $150,000 to be used for the purchase of a new tank.

== Library ==
The Penn Township Public Library is located at 195 Union Street. The collection of the library contains 9,872 volumes and circulates 5,200 items per year, serving a population of 1,308 area residents.

== Churches ==
=== Cornerstone Church of Pennville ===
Previously known as Pennville United Methodist Church, this church is located at 160 West Main Street. The current church building was dedicated in 1917.

== Cemeteries ==
=== Hillside Cemetery ===
Hillside Cemetery, also known as Quaker Cemetery, is located on a gently sloping hill at the east end of town on East Lagro Street at Grisell Avenue. Many early settlers of Pennville are interred here, including Samuel Grisell, who platted the town in 1836.

=== Maple Lawn Cemetery ===
Maple Lawn Cemetery, also known as Mason Cemetery, is located on the extreme east side of the town. East Maple Street dead-ends into the cemetery. Large trees that once lined the back of the cemetery to the east were destroyed by a tornado in the 1980s.

=== IOOF Cemetery ===
Located approximately 1 1/2 miles east of the town limits on County Road W400N (extended East Lagro Street), this cemetery is the largest burial ground in the Pennville area. Over 4,000 persons are buried here, including many area Civil War veterans, including Thomas J. Cartwright, Enoch B. Hartley, Aaron W. Letts, Simon P. Morrow, Albert Pugh, Stephen B. H. Shanks, Aaron L. Somers, Jacob Walker, and Morris C. Ward.

== Places of cultural and historical interest ==
=== Chandlee-Gregg-Hedges House ===
Pennville has one of the oldest houses in Jay County, the Chandlee-Gregg-Hedges house, built by Goldsmith Chandlee sometime between 1836 and 1841. The house, which stands at 129 West Lagro Street, has also been owned by the Gregg, Hedges, and Springer families.

=== Twin Hills ===
The Twin Hills lie approximately 2–3 miles east, north-east of Pennville. Technically "moraines," accumulations of unconsolidated glacial debris formed by early glaciers, the hills range 100–150 foot high and are made up mostly of gravel and sand. Only one of the hills has been left intact, due to the high gravel content being used for roads and railroads.

=== Underground Railroad and Eliza Harris Marker ===
Founded by Hicksite Quakers, who were early abolitionists, Pennville and the surrounding area is rich in the history of the Underground Railroad. Approximately 2 1/2 miles north of Pennville on Indiana State Road 1, near Balbec, Indiana, a marker was erected in 1923 to mark the site of the pioneer home of Jimmy and Rachel Silliven, an important "station" of the Underground Railroad. The marker memorializes the local legend that the real run-away slave, on whom the character of Eliza Harris of Uncle Tom's Cabin was based, stopped at the Silliven home on her way to freedom. The marker bears the inscription:
A station on the Underground Railroad
Tradition says Eliza Harris
Of Uncle Tom's Cabin fame
Rested here in her flight to Canada.

== Notable people ==
- Jim Paxson Sr. (1932–2014) – former collegiate & NBA basketball player; father of Jim Paxson and John Paxson, both NBA players.
