= College Corner, Jay County, Indiana =

- Unincorporated community
- Location within Indiana Location within the United States
- Coordinates: 40°24′39″N 84°58′38″W
- Country: United States
- State: Indiana
- County: Jay
- Township: Wayne
- Elevation: 922 ft (281 m)
- ZIP code: 47371
- FIPS code: 18-14338
- GNIS feature ID: 432765

College Corner is a former settlement and now a locale (or crossroads community) in Wayne Township, Jay County, Indiana.

== History ==
College Corner was founded in 1850, and named from the presence of Farmers Academy. College Corner had a post office in the mid-1800s, from 1862 until 1872. Various maps - from 1887 and 1926 show the settlement's loss of housing and structures.

== Sources ==
- Montgomery, M. W. (1864). History of Jay County, Indiana. Chicago: Church, Goodman, & Cushing. OCLC 3558118. (History of Jay County, Indiana at the Internet Archive College Corner, Jay County, Indiana at the HathiTrust Digital Library, also republished by Kessinger Publishing as ISBN 1-166-18084-0)
