= Penn Township, Jay County, Indiana =

Penn Township
- Township
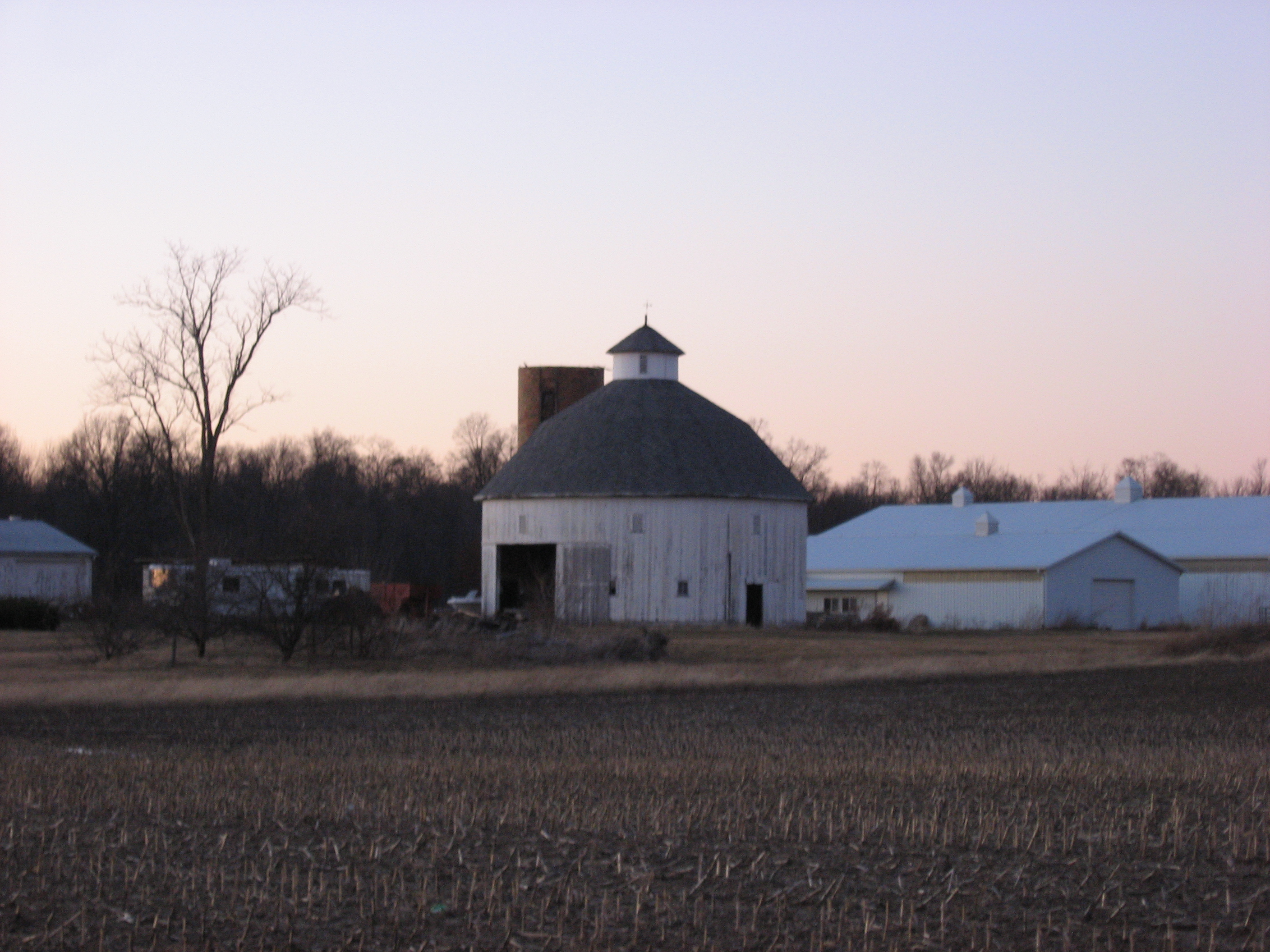
- The Rebecca Rankin Round Barn, a township landmark

- Location in Jay County
- Coordinates: 40°31′45″N 85°09′29″W
- Country: United States
- State: Indiana
- County: Jay

Government
  - Type: Indiana township

Area
  - Total: 30.21 sq mi (78.2 km^{2})
  - Land: 30.19 sq mi (78.2 km^{2})
  - Water: 0.02 sq mi (0.052 km^{2}) 0.07%
- Elevation: 892 ft (272 m)

Population (2020)
  - Total: 1,133
  - Density: 37.53/sq mi (14.49/km^{2})
- GNIS feature ID: 0453712

Penn Township is one of twelve townships in Jay County, Indiana, United States. As of the 2020 census, its population was 1,133 (down from 1,239 at 2010) and it contained 530 housing units.

== History ==
Penn Township was named in honor of William Penn.

The Rebecca Rankin Round Barn was listed on the National Register of Historic Places in 1993.

== Geography ==
According to the 2010 census, the township has a total area of 30.21 square miles (78.2 km^{2}), of which 30.19 square miles (78.2 km^{2}) (or 99.93%) is land and 0.02 square miles (0.052 km^{2}) (or 0.07%) is water. The streams of Brooks Creek and Haines Creek run through this township.

=== Cities and towns ===
- Pennville

=== Unincorporated towns ===
- Balbec
- Fiat

=== Adjacent townships ===
- Nottingham Township, Wells County (north)
- Jackson Township (east)
- Greene Township (southeast)
- Knox Township (south)
- Harrison Township, Blackford County (west)

=== Cemeteries ===
The township contains three cemeteries: Hillside, Maple Lawn and West Grove.

=== Major highways ===
- SR 1
- SR 18
