= Balbec, Indiana =

- Unincorporated community
- Location within Indiana Location within the United States
- Coordinates: 40°31′51″N 85°08′56″W
- Country: United States
- State: Indiana
- County: Jay
- Township: Penn
- Elevation: 879 ft (268 m)
- ZIP code: 47326
- FIPS code: 18-03241
- GNIS feature ID: 430443

Balbec is an unincorporated community in Penn Township, Jay County, Indiana.

== History ==
A post office was established at Balbec in 1865, and remained in operation until it was discontinued in 1919. The community was likely named after Baalbek, in Lebanon.
