= Bluff Point, Indiana =

- Unincorporated community
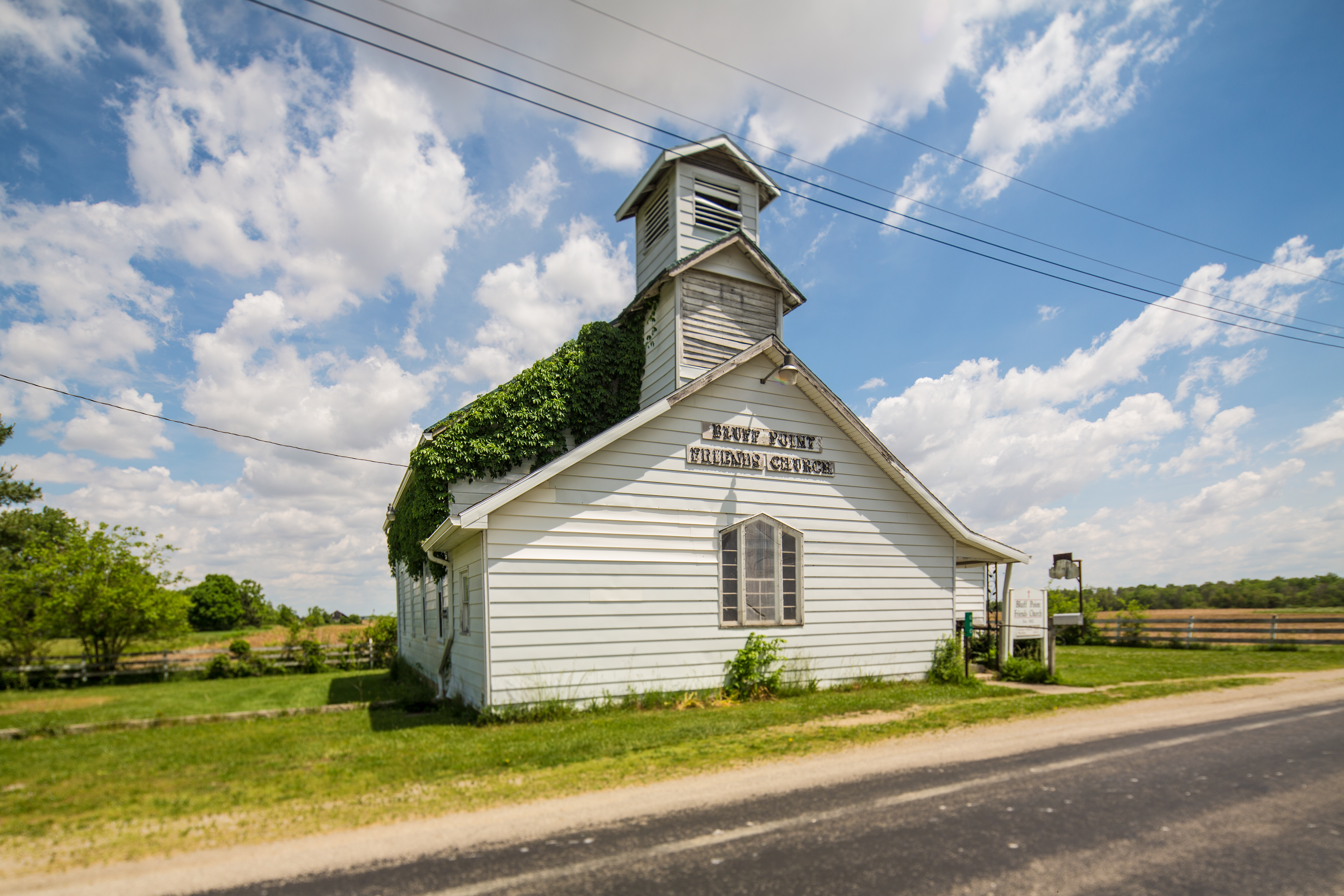

- Location within Indiana Location within the United States
- Coordinates: 40°20′45″N 84°58′38″W
- Country: United States
- State: Indiana
- County: Jay
- Township: Pike
- Elevation: 997 ft (304 m)
- Time zone: UTC-5 (Eastern (EST))
  - Summer (DST): UTC-4 (EDT)
- ZIP code: 47371
- GNIS feature ID: 431262

Bluff Point is an unincorporated community in Pike Township, Jay County, in the U.S. state of Indiana.

== History ==
Bluff Point was so named from its lofty elevation. The post office at Bluff Point was discontinued in 1904.
