= Lancaster Township, Indiana =

Lancaster Township is the name of three townships in the U.S. state of Indiana:

- Lancaster Township, Huntington County, Indiana
- Lancaster Township, Jefferson County, Indiana
- Lancaster Township, Wells County, Indiana

== See also ==
- Lancaster Township (disambiguation)
