= Jay County, Indiana =

County in Indiana, United States

- County
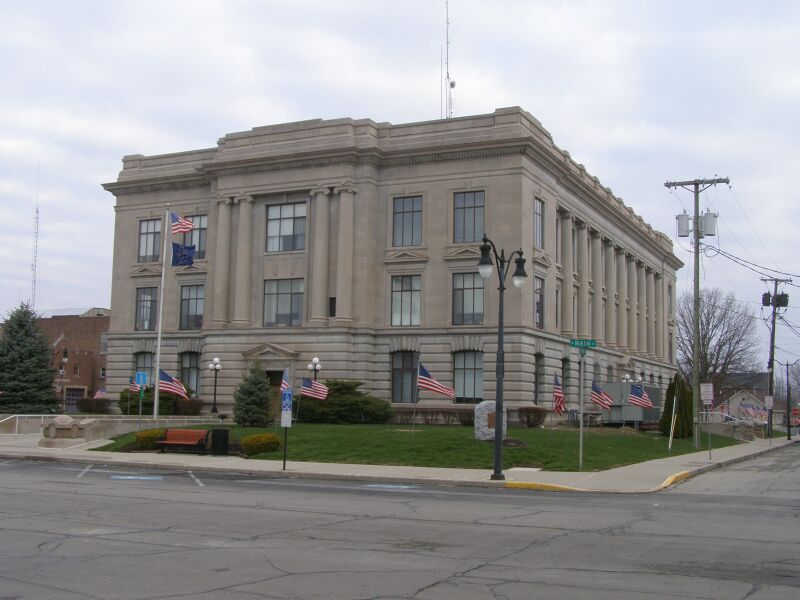
- Jay County Courthouse

- Seal

- Location within the U.S. state of Indiana
- Coordinates: 40°26′N 85°01′W
- Country: United States
- State: Indiana
- Founded: February 7, 1835 (authorized); 1836 (organized)
- Named for: John Jay
- Seat: Portland
- Largest city: Portland

Area
  - Total: 384.08 sq mi (994.8 km^{2})
  - Land: 383.90 sq mi (994.3 km^{2})
  - Water: 0.18 sq mi (0.47 km^{2}) 0.05%

Population (2020)
  - Total: 20,478
  - Estimate (2025): 20,118 ▼
  - Density: 52.5/sq mi (20.3/km^{2})
- Time zone: UTC−5 (Eastern)
  - Summer (DST): UTC−4 (EDT)
- Congressional district: 3rd
- Website: jaycounty.net
- Indiana county number 38

Jay County Sheriff's Department

Jurisdictional structure
- Operations jurisdiction: Jay, Indiana, United States
- Legal jurisdiction: As per operations jurisdiction
- General nature: Local civilian police

Operational structure
- Agency executives: Dwane Ford, Sheriff; Patrick Wells, Chief Deputy

Facilities
- Jails: 1

Jay County is a county in the U.S. state of Indiana. As of 2020, the population was 20,478. The county seat is Portland.

== History ==
The Indiana State Legislature passed an omnibus county bill on February 7, 1835 that authorized the creation of thirteen counties in northeast Indiana, including Jay – the only county in the United States named for John Jay (1745–1829), co-author of The Federalist Papers, Secretary of Foreign Affairs under the Articles of Confederation, and first Chief Justice of the United States.

== Geography ==
Jay County lies on the east side of Indiana; its east border abuts the western border of Ohio. Its low, rolling terrain is entirely devoted to agriculture or urban development. Its highest point (1,121 feet/342 meters ASL) is a small rise on the east border with Ohio, 2,600 feet north of the county's SE corner. The Salamonie River originates near Salamonia in southeastern Jay County and flows generally northwestwardly into Blackford County (It joins the Wabash River from the south in Wabash County). According to the 2010 United States census, the county has a total area of 384.08 square miles (994.8 km^{2}), of which 383.90 square miles (994.3 km^{2}) (or 99.95%) is land and 0.18 square miles (0.47 km^{2}) (or 0.05%) is water.

=== Adjacent counties ===
- Adams County - north
- Mercer County, Ohio - east
- Darke County, Ohio - southeast
- Randolph County - south
- Delaware County - southwest
- Blackford County - west
- Wells County - northwest

=== Cities and towns ===
- Bryant
- Dunkirk
- Pennville
- Portland
- Redkey
- Salamonia

=== Townships ===
- Bearcreek
- Greene
- Jackson
- Jefferson
- Knox
- Madison
- Noble
- Penn
- Pike
- Richland
- Wabash
- Wayne

=== Unincorporated communities ===
- Antioch
- Balbec
- Bellfountain
- Blaine
- Bloomfield
- Bluff Point
- Boundary City
- College Corner
- Collett
- Como
- Fiat
- Greene
- Jay City
- Liber
- New Corydon
- New Mount Pleasant
- Noble
- Pleasant Ridge
- Poling
- Powers
- Ridertown
- Salem
- West Liberty
- Westchester

=== Major highways ===
Sources: National Atlas, US Census Bureau

- US 27
- SR 1
- SR 18
- SR 26
- SR 67
- SR 167

== Climate and weather ==
Portland, Indiana

Climate chart (precipitation, max. and min. temperature)
J	F	M	A	M	J	J	A	S	O	N	D
1.9 32 15	1.9 37 18	2.6 48 27	3.6 60 38	3.9 71 49	4.1 80 59	4.4 84 62	4 82 60	2.7 76 52	2.6 64 40	3 50 32	2.5 37 21
- █ Average max. and min. temperatures in °F
- █ Precipitation totals in inches
- Source: The Weather Channel
Metric conversion
J	F	M	A	M	J	J	A	S	O	N	D
47 0 −9	49 3 −8	66 9 −3	92 16 3	100 22 9	105 27 15	112 29 17	101 28 16	69 24 11	66 18 4	77 10 0	63 3 −6
- █ Average max. and min. temperatures in °C
- █ Precipitation totals in mm

In recent years, average temperatures in Portland have ranged from a low of 15 °F (−9 °C) in January to a high of 84 °F (29 °C) in July, although a record low of −29 °F (−34 °C) was recorded in January 1985 and a record high of 102 °F (39 °C) was recorded in June 1988. Average monthly precipitation ranged from 1.87 inches (47 mm) in January to 4.40 inches (112 mm) in July.

== Demographics ==
Historical population
Census	Pop.	Note	%±
1840	3,863		—
1850	7,047		82.4%
1860	11,399		61.8%
1870	15,000		31.6%
1880	19,282		28.5%
1890	23,478		21.8%
1900	26,818		14.2%
1910	24,961		−6.9%
1920	23,318		−6.6%
1930	20,846		−10.6%
1940	22,601		8.4%
1950	23,157		2.5%
1960	22,572		−2.5%
1970	23,575		4.4%
1980	23,239		−1.4%
1990	21,512		−7.4%
2000	21,806		1.4%
2010	21,253		−2.5%
2020	20,478		−3.6%
2025 (est.)	20,118	▼	−1.8%

=== Racial and ethnic composition ===
Jay County, Indiana – Racial and ethnic composition Note: the US Census treats Hispanic/Latino as an ethnic category. This table excludes Latinos from the racial categories and assigns them to a separate category. Hispanics/Latinos may be of any race.
Race / Ethnicity (NH = Non-Hispanic)	Pop 1980	Pop 1990	Pop 2000	Pop 2010	Pop 2020	% 1980	% 1990	% 2000	% 2010	% 2020
White alone (NH)	22,993	21,228	21,131	20,356	18,892	98.94%	98.68%	96.90%	95.78%	92.26%
Black or African American alone (NH)	48	28	54	58	53	0.21%	0.13%	0.25%	0.27%	0.26%
Native American or Alaska Native alone (NH)	24	31	35	21	24	0.10%	0.14%	0.16%	0.10%	0.12%
Asian alone (NH)	29	66	74	77	64	0.12%	0.31%	0.34%	0.36%	0.31%
Native Hawaiian or Pacific Islander alone (NH)	x	x	5	0	12	x	x	0.02%	0.00%	0.06%
Other race alone (NH)	11	8	4	13	26	0.05%	0.04%	0.02%	0.06%	0.13%
Mixed race or Multiracial (NH)	x	x	113	151	463	x	x	0.52%	0.71%	2.26%
Hispanic or Latino (any race)	134	151	390	577	944	0.58%	0.70%	1.79%	2.71%	4.61%
Total	23,239	21,512	21,806	21,253	20,478	100.00%	100.00%	100.00%	100.00%	100.00%

=== 2020 census ===
As of the 2020 census, the county had a population of 20,478. The median age was 39.9 years. 25.6% of residents were under the age of 18 and 18.8% of residents were 65 years of age or older. For every 100 females there were 100.5 males, and for every 100 females age 18 and over there were 98.2 males age 18 and over.

The racial makeup of the county was 93.5% White, 0.3% Black or African American, 0.2% American Indian and Alaska Native, 0.3% Asian, 0.1% Native Hawaiian and Pacific Islander, 2.4% from some other race, and 3.3% from two or more races. Hispanic or Latino residents of any race comprised 4.6% of the population.

31.1% of residents lived in urban areas, while 68.9% lived in rural areas.

There were 7,902 households in the county, of which 29.6% had children under the age of 18 living in them. Of all households, 49.9% were married-couple households, 19.4% were households with a male householder and no spouse or partner present, and 23.4% were households with a female householder and no spouse or partner present. About 28.1% of all households were made up of individuals and 13.2% had someone living alone who was 65 years of age or older.

There were 8,890 housing units, of which 11.1% were vacant. Among occupied housing units, 74.6% were owner-occupied and 25.4% were renter-occupied. The homeowner vacancy rate was 1.9% and the rental vacancy rate was 9.8%.

=== 2010 census ===
As of the 2010 United States census, there were 21,253 people, 8,133 households, and 5,647 families in the county. The population density was 55.4 inhabitants per square mile (21.4/km^{2}). There were 9,221 housing units at an average density of 24.0 per square mile (9.3/km^{2}). The racial makeup of the county was 97.0% white, 0.4% Asian, 0.3% black or African American, 0.1% American Indian, 1.3% from other races, and 0.9% from two or more races. Those of Hispanic or Latino origin made up 2.7% of the population. In terms of ancestry, 34.1% were German, 13.1% were American, 11.7% were English, and 11.6% were Irish.

Of the 8,133 households, 32.8% had children under the age of 18 living with them, 53.6% were married couples living together, 10.4% had a female householder with no husband present, 30.6% were non-families, and 25.6% of all households were made up of individuals. The average household size was 2.58 and the average family size was 3.10. The median age was 39.0 years.

The median income for a household in the county was $47,697 and the median income for a family was $47,926. Males had a median income of $38,142 versus $26,928 for females. The per capita income for the county was $18,946. About 10.0% of families and 13.5% of the population were below the poverty line, including 22.7% of those under age 18 and 7.8% of those age 65 or over.

== Government ==
The county government is a constitutional body, and is granted specific powers by the Constitution of Indiana and by the Indiana Code.

County Council: The county council is the legislative branch of the county government and controls all the spending and revenue collection in the county. Representatives, elected to four-year terms from county districts, are responsible for setting salaries, the annual budget, and special spending. The council has limited authority to impose local taxes, in the form of an income and property tax that is subject to state level approval, excise taxes, and service taxes.

Board of Commissioners: The executive body of the county; commissioners are elected county-wide to staggered four-year terms. One commissioner serves as president. The commissioners execute the acts legislated by the council, collecting revenue, and managing the day-to-day functions of the county government.

Court: The county maintains circuit and superior courts with the latter having a small claims division. Both courts have general jurisdiction with the circuit court having exclusive jurisdiction of juvenile and probate matters. The court's judges are elected to six-year terms, and must be admitted to practice law before the state supreme court. In some cases, court decisions can be appealed to the state level circuit court.

County Officials: The county has other elected offices, including prosecuting attorney, assessor, sheriff, coroner, auditor, treasurer, recorder, surveyor, and circuit court clerk Each officer is elected to four-year terms. Members elected to county government positions are required to declare party affiliations and to be residents of the county.

Jay County is part of Indiana's 3rd congressional district; Indiana Senate district 19; and Indiana House of Representatives district 33.

United States presidential election results for Jay County, Indiana
Year	Republican		Democratic		Third party(ies)	
Year	No.	%	No.	%	No.	%
1888	2,811	48.42%	2,741	47.22%	253	4.36%
1892	2,414	41.78%	2,359	40.83%	1,005	17.39%
1896	3,473	47.66%	3,680	50.50%	134	1.84%
1900	3,518	48.90%	3,422	47.57%	254	3.53%
1904	3,612	51.78%	2,702	38.74%	661	9.48%
1908	3,256	45.75%	3,370	47.35%	491	6.90%
1912	1,282	20.38%	2,786	44.29%	2,222	35.33%
1916	3,075	46.49%	3,070	46.41%	470	7.11%
1920	6,089	53.35%	4,759	41.69%	566	4.96%
1924	5,753	52.83%	4,812	44.19%	325	2.98%
1928	5,998	55.31%	4,759	43.89%	87	0.80%
1932	5,018	42.85%	6,693	57.15%	0	0.00%
1936	5,233	43.73%	6,535	54.61%	199	1.66%
1940	6,478	49.27%	6,554	49.84%	117	0.89%
1944	6,207	53.38%	5,166	44.42%	256	2.20%
1948	5,635	49.25%	5,520	48.24%	287	2.51%
1952	7,270	58.96%	4,764	38.63%	297	2.41%
1956	6,767	59.08%	4,571	39.91%	116	1.01%
1960	6,519	56.73%	4,899	42.63%	74	0.64%
1964	4,439	39.22%	6,781	59.91%	98	0.87%
1968	5,460	51.00%	4,290	40.07%	955	8.92%
1972	6,090	64.21%	3,349	35.31%	45	0.47%
1976	4,606	52.24%	4,124	46.77%	87	0.99%
1980	5,351	58.06%	3,256	35.33%	610	6.62%
1984	5,975	64.90%	3,174	34.47%	58	0.63%
1988	5,363	62.22%	3,212	37.26%	45	0.52%
1992	3,609	40.84%	3,208	36.31%	2,019	22.85%
1996	3,584	44.71%	3,356	41.86%	1,077	13.43%
2000	4,687	58.37%	3,167	39.44%	176	2.19%
2004	5,427	65.93%	2,740	33.28%	65	0.79%
2008	4,401	52.88%	3,748	45.03%	174	2.09%
2012	4,645	58.79%	3,063	38.77%	193	2.44%
2016	5,697	71.02%	1,889	23.55%	436	5.44%
2020	6,361	75.14%	1,926	22.75%	179	2.11%
2024	6,217	76.61%	1,747	21.53%	151	1.86%

== See also ==
- National Register of Historic Places listings in Jay County, Indiana
