= Antioch, Jay County, Indiana =

- Unincorporated community
- Location within Indiana Location within the United States
- Coordinates: 40°22′04″N 84°56′32″W
- Country: United States
- State: Indiana
- County: Jay
- Township: Pike
- Elevation: 968 ft (295 m)
- ZIP code: 47371
- FIPS code: 18-01846
- GNIS feature ID: 430199

Antioch is an unincorporated community in Pike Township, Jay County, Indiana.

== History ==
Antioch was founded in 1853. It was named after Antioch College.
