= Bryant, Indiana =

- Town
- Town of Bryant
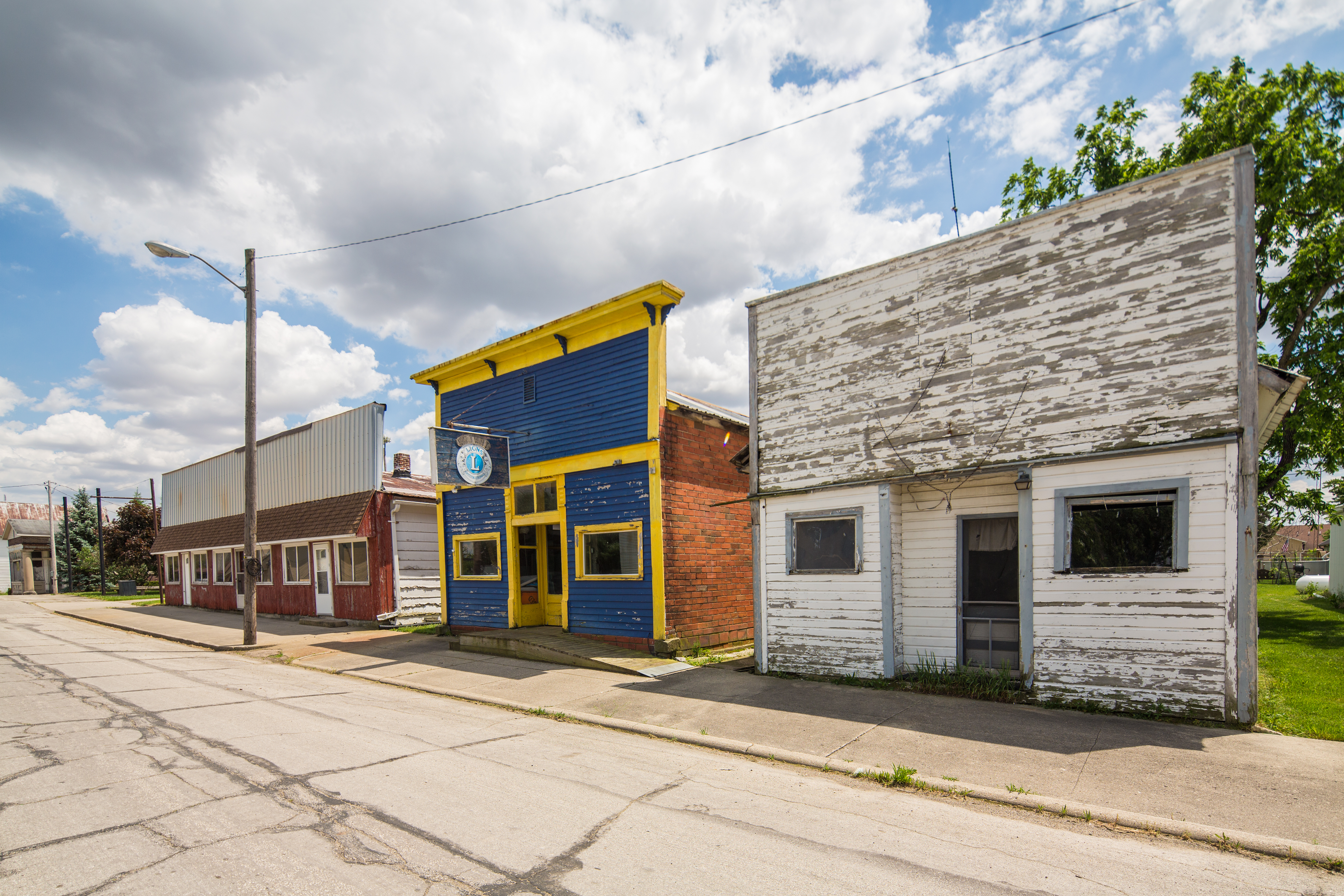

- Flag Seal

- Location of Bryant in Jay County, Indiana.
- Coordinates: 40°32′09″N 84°57′48″W
- Country: United States
- State: Indiana
- County: Jay
- Township: Bearcreek
- Established: 1871
- Incorporated: 1897

Area
  - Total: 0.32 sq mi (0.83 km^{2})
  - Land: 0.32 sq mi (0.83 km^{2})
  - Water: 0 sq mi (0.00 km^{2})
- Elevation: 873 ft (266 m)

Population (2020)
  - Total: 239
  - Estimate (2025): 230 ▼
  - Density: 750/sq mi (289.6/km^{2})
- Time zone: UTC-5 (EST)
  - Summer (DST): UTC-5 (EST)
- ZIP code: 47326
- Area code: 260
- FIPS code: 18-08704
- GNIS feature ID: 2396615

Bryant is a town in Bearcreek Township, Jay County, Indiana, United States. The population was 239 at the 2020 census.

== History ==
Bryant had its start in 1871 by the building of the railroad through that territory. Its name is derived from that of an Irishman named Bryan, who was instrumental in bringing the railroad there. The Bryant post office was established in 1872. Bryant was incorporated as a town in 1897.

== Geography ==
According to the 2010 census, the town has a total area of 0.30 square miles (0.78 km^{2}), all land.

== Demographics ==
Historical population
| Census | Pop. | Note | %± |
|---|---|---|---|
| 1880 | 189 | | — |
| 1900 | 384 | | — |
| 1910 | 469 | | 22.1% |
| 1920 | 428 | | −8.7% |
| 1930 | 319 | | −25.5% |
| 1940 | 332 | | 4.1% |
| 1950 | 339 | | 2.1% |
| 1960 | 316 | | −6.8% |
| 1970 | 320 | | 1.3% |
| 1980 | 277 | | −13.4% |
| 1990 | 273 | | −1.4% |
| 2000 | 272 | | −0.4% |
| 2010 | 252 | | −7.4% |
| 2020 | 239 | | −5.2% |
| 2025 (est.) | 230 | ▼ | −3.8% |
U.S. Decennial Census

=== 2010 census ===
As of the census of 2010, there were 252 people, 99 households, and 68 families living in the town. The population density was 840.0 inhabitants per square mile (324.3/km^{2}). There were 116 housing units at an average density of 386.7 per square mile (149.3/km^{2}). The racial makeup of the town was 97.2% White, 0.4% African American, 0.8% Native American, 0.8% Asian, and 0.8% from two or more races. Hispanic or Latino of any race were 2.4% of the population.

There were 99 households, of which 32.3% had children under the age of 18 living with them, 48.5% were married couples living together, 9.1% had a female householder with no husband present, 11.1% had a male householder with no wife present, and 31.3% were non-families. 28.3% of all households were made up of individuals, and 9.1% had someone living alone who was 65 years of age or older. The average household size was 2.55 and the average family size was 3.07.

The median age in the town was 38.5 years. 24.2% of residents were under the age of 18; 9.4% were between the ages of 18 and 24; 22.6% were from 25 to 44; 29.3% were from 45 to 64; and 14.3% were 65 years of age or older. The gender makeup of the town was 49.2% male and 50.8% female.

=== 2000 census ===
As of the census of 2000, there were 272 people, 95 households, and 74 families living in the town. The population density was 897.9 inhabitants per square mile (346.7/km^{2}). There were 109 housing units at an average density of 359.8 per square mile (138.9/km^{2}). The racial makeup of the town was 97.79% White, 0.37% Asian, 0.37% from other races, and 1.47% from two or more races. Hispanic or Latino of any race were 1.10% of the population.

There were 95 households, out of which 35.8% had children under the age of 18 living with them, 64.2% were married couples living together, 6.3% had a female householder with no husband present, and 22.1% were non-families. 18.9% of all households were made up of individuals, and 7.4% had someone living alone who was 65 years of age or older. The average household size was 2.86 and the average family size was 3.27.

In the town, the population was spread out, with 30.9% under the age of 18, 7.7% from 18 to 24, 32.7% from 25 to 44, 18.8% from 45 to 64, and 9.9% who were 65 years of age or older. The median age was 32 years. For every 100 females there were 121.1 males. For every 100 females age 18 and over, there were 106.6 males.

The median income for a household in the town was $34,821, and the median income for a family was $41,042. Males had a median income of $21,833 versus $17,266 for females. The per capita income for the town was $13,416. None of the families and 4.4% of the population were living below the poverty line.
