= Madison Township, Jay County, Indiana =

Madison Township
- Township
- Location in Jay County
- Coordinates: 40°21′19″N 84°51′36″W
- Country: United States
- State: Indiana
- County: Jay

Government
  - Type: Indiana township

Area
  - Total: 30.83 sq mi (79.8 km^{2})
  - Land: 30.82 sq mi (79.8 km^{2})
  - Water: 0.01 sq mi (0.026 km^{2}) 0.03%
- Elevation: 1,007 ft (307 m)

Population (2020)
  - Total: 643
  - Density: 20.9/sq mi (8.06/km^{2})
- GNIS feature ID: 0453592

Madison Township is one of twelve townships in Jay County, Indiana, United States. As of the 2020 census, its population was 643 (down from 656 at 2010) and it contained 264 housing units.

Madison Township was established in 1835.

== Geography ==
According to the 2010 census, the township has a total area of 30.83 square miles (79.8 km^{2}), of which 30.82 square miles (79.8 km^{2}) (or 99.97%) is land and 0.01 square miles (0.026 km^{2}) (or 0.03%) is water. The streams of Mad Run, Madison Creek, Speed Run and Walnut Creek run through this township.

=== Cities and towns ===
- Salamonia

=== Unincorporated towns ===
- Salem
