= Noble Township, Jay County, Indiana =

Noble Township
- Township
- Location in Jay County
- Coordinates: 40°26′26″N 84°51′17″W
- Country: United States
- State: Indiana
- County: Jay

Government
  - Type: Indiana township

Area
  - Total: 31.13 sq mi (80.6 km^{2})
  - Land: 31.13 sq mi (80.6 km^{2})
  - Water: 0 sq mi (0 km^{2}) 0%
- Elevation: 958 ft (292 m)

Population (2020)
  - Total: 675
  - Density: 21.7/sq mi (8.37/km^{2})
- GNIS feature ID: 0453670

Noble Township is one of twelve townships in Jay County, Indiana, United States. As of the 2020 census, its population was 675 (up from 640 at 2010) and it contained 240 housing units.

== History ==
Noble Township was organized in 1837. It was named for Noah Noble, 5th Governor of Indiana.

== Geography ==
According to the 2010 census, the township has a total area of 31.13 square miles (80.6 km^{2}), all land. The streams of East Prong Franks Drain, Sycamore Fork and West Prong Franks Drain run through this township.

=== Unincorporated towns ===
- Bellfountain
- Noble

=== Major highways ===
- SR 26
