= List of United States tornadoes from August to October 2024 =

List of tornadoes in the United States

United States tornadoes from August to October 2024
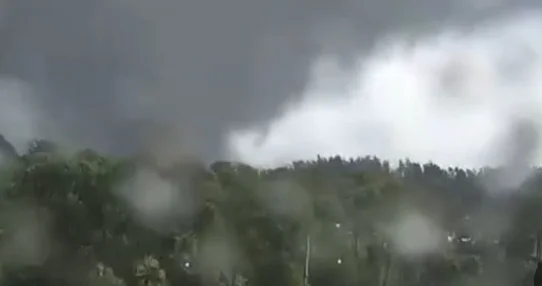
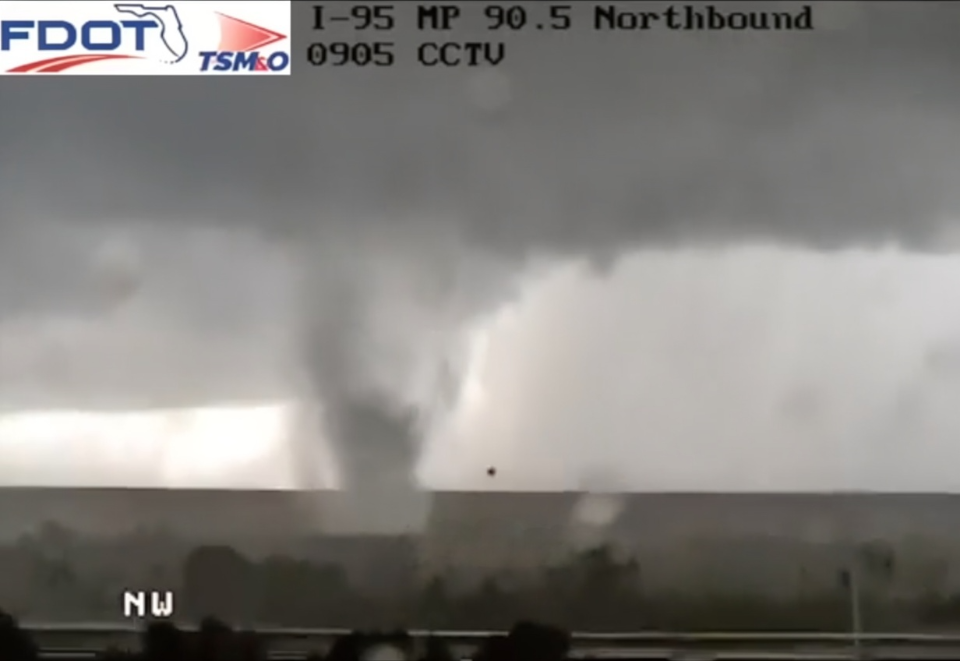
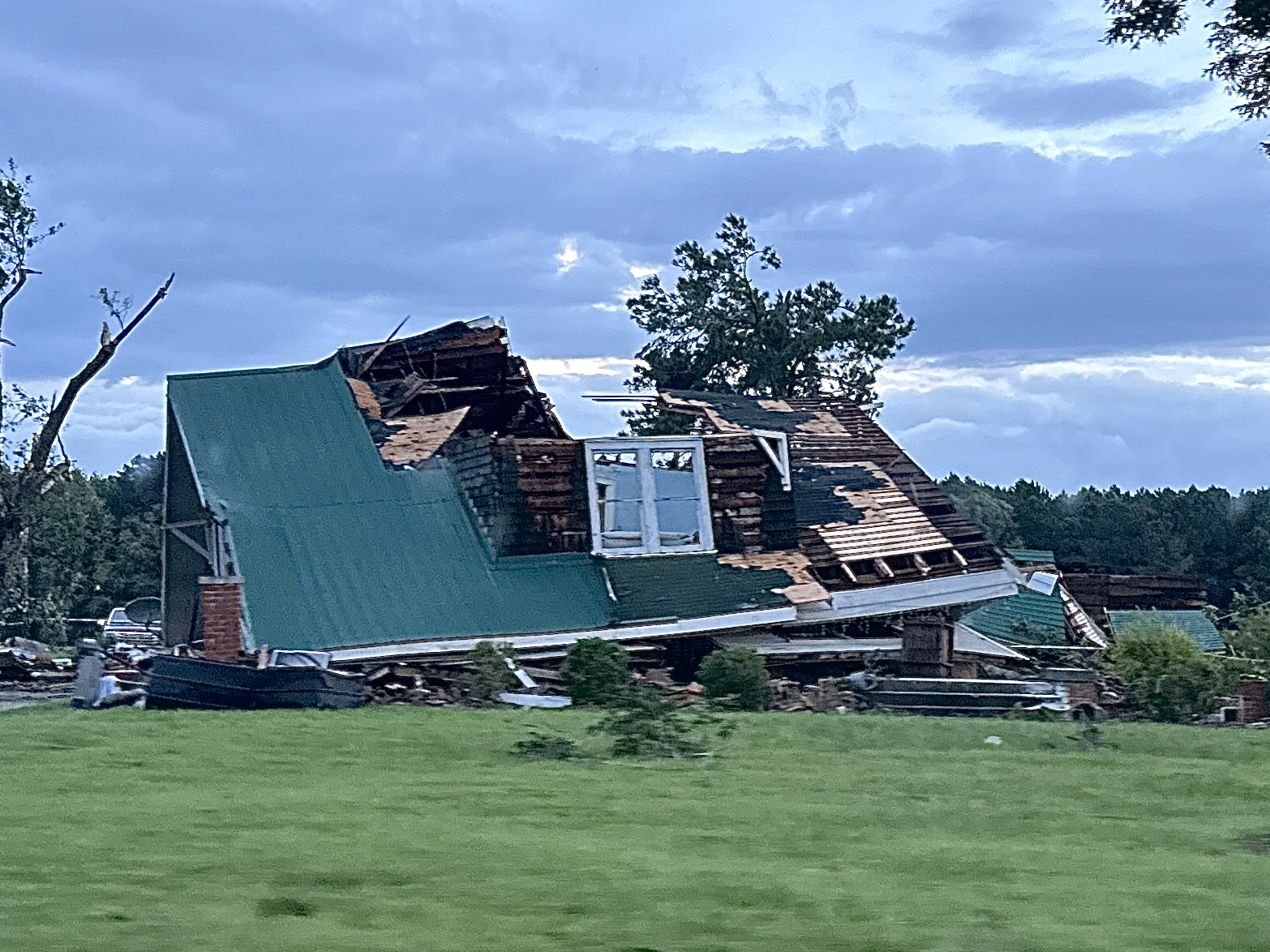
- Clockwise from top: A deadly EF3 tornado near Fort Pierce, Florida on October 9; EF3 damage in Lucama, North Carolina after a tornado on August 8; an EF3 tornado near Wellington, Florida on October 9
- Timespan: January 5 – March 26
- Maximum rated tornado: EF3 tornado: Lucama, North Carolina on August 8; Rocky Mount, North Carolina on September 27; Lakeport, Florida on October 9; Wellington–The Acreage, Florida on October 9; Fort Pierce–Lakewood Park, Florida on October 9
- Tornadoes: 216
- Fatalities: 9
- Injuries: 33

This page documents all tornadoes confirmed by various weather forecast offices of the National Weather Service in the United States in August, September and October 2024. Tornado counts are considered preliminary until final publication in the database of the National Centers for Environmental Information.

Similar to July, the northern states nearer the Canadian border are most favored for tornadoes in August, including the Upper Midwest, the Great Lakes, and the Northeastern states, due to the positioning of the summertime jet stream. In addition, there can also be occasional increases in the southern and eastern United States as a result of tornadoes from landfalling tropical cyclones should such occur. On average, there are 81 confirmed tornadoes in August. In September, tornadoes are most likely to occur in relation to the Atlantic hurricane season (as September is the peak month of hurricane season), and they can occur almost anywhere in the southern and eastern states as a result of landfalling tropical cyclones should such occur. A secondary focal point lies in the Midwest and Great Lakes as a result of early-autumn frontal systems. On average, there are 66 confirmed tornadoes in the United States in September. While tropical activity tends to decrease in October, the relative peak shifts into the Great Plains and towards the southern states as the jet stream shifts southward (albeit generally with less activity than in the spring months in the same regions). On average, 59 tornadoes are confirmed in October.

The late summer and early fall brought near average activity, with the tropics a primary focus. Similar to the previous month, activity during the beginning of the month was mainly due to the tropics as Hurricane Debby spawned 24 tornadoes. Simultaneous tornado activity also occurred in the Midwestern United States and Great Lakes region during that time. However, tornado activity then went dormant until the last few days of the month as non-tornadic severe storms became the norm. August ended with a near average amount of 87 confirmed tornadoes. September was quiet for the majority of the month until the last week, when Hurricane Helene produced an outbreak of almost 3 dozen tornadoes, one of which killed 2 people. September ended with a slightly above average amount of 76 tornadoes. October had a slightly below average amount of 53 tornadoes. Most were the result of Hurricane Milton that produced a prolific tornado outbreak in Florida, with 6 fatalities confirmed a result of the tornadoes. Another severe weather event happened on the last 2 days of the month producing multiple weak tornadoes.

== August ==
Confirmed tornadoes by Enhanced Fujita rating
EFU	EF0	EF1	EF2	EF3	EF4	EF5	Total
20	27	35	4	1	0	0	87

=== August 3 event ===
List of confirmed tornadoes – Saturday, August 3, 2024 (Note: All dates are based on the local time zone where the tornado touched down; however, all times are in Coordinated Universal Time for consistency.)
EF#	Location	County / Parish	State	Start Coord.	Time (UTC)	Path length	Max width
EF1	Fuquay-Varina (1st tornado)	Wake	NC	35.595°N 78.8167°W	21:28–21:31	0.89 mi (1.43 km)	30 yd (27 m)
EF1	A tornado initially touched down in a field on the northside of town before moving east deeper into the town. Several large trees were snapped or uprooted. The tornado then impacted a church, damaging the roof, an awning, and outdoor electrical equipment. It lifted shortly after.						
EF0	Fuquay-Varina (2nd tornado)	Wake	NC	35.6°N 78.79°W	21:31	0.1 mi (0.16 km)	
EF0	This brief high-end EF0 tornado touched down on the eastern portion of the Fuquay-Varina High School campus. Two baseball dugouts had their roofs torn off and a small building was overturned off its foundation before lifting.						
EF1	Western Melrose to WSW of New Munich	Stearns	MN	45.6863°N 94.8297°W	01:11–01:20	5.36 mi (8.63 km)	1,000 yd (910 m)
EF1	This large tornado tracked through the west side of Melrose, damaging some homes and businesses. The tornado continued south of the town, striking a few farmsteads and causing minor damage before lifting.						

=== August 4 event ===
Events are associated with Hurricane Debby.

List of confirmed tornadoes – Sunday, August 4, 2024
EF#	Location	County / Parish	State	Start Coord.	Time (UTC)	Path length	Max width
EF0	W of Bowling Green	Hardee, Polk	FL	27.64°N 81.85°W	17:25–17:27	1.17 mi (1.88 km)	25 yd (23 m)
EF0	A tornado was observed and tracked through mostly rural areas. It caused limited visible damage before dissipating shortly after crossing into Polk County.						
EF0	SW of Bartow	Polk	FL	27.85°N 81.88°W	18:58–19:00	1.52 mi (2.45 km)	25 yd (23 m)
EF0	This tornado was observed and remained on the ground for about two minutes over open fields before dissipating. No significant damage was reported, though minor tree damage likely occurred.						
EF0	Madeira Beach to W of Seminole	Pinellas	FL	27.7994°N 82.8014°W	22:50–22:53	2.18 mi (3.51 km)	50 yd (46 m)
EF0	A tornado began as a waterspout on the Gulf of Mexico and was first observed west of Treasure Island. The waterspout eventually made landfall and became a tornado in Madeira Beach. In town, minor damage occurred to fencing and a trailer before lifting.						
EF1	SE of Lulu	Union	FL	29.9999°N 82.5064°W	23:40–23:41	0.18 mi (0.29 km)	20 yd (18 m)
EF1	A trailer was overturned, the roof of a shed was torn off, a wooden fence was knocked down, and a few trees were snapped or uprooted.						
EF0	W of Lulu	Columbia	FL	30.05°N 82.6°W	23:56–23:57	1.38 mi (2.22 km)	20 yd (18 m)
EF0	A trained storm spotter observed a tornado crossing Interstate 75.						

=== August 5 event ===
Events in South Carolina are associated with Hurricane Debby.

List of confirmed tornadoes – Monday, August 5, 2024
EF#	Location	County / Parish	State	Start Coord.	Time (UTC)	Path length	Max width
EF1	Fort Erie, ON to Buffalo, NY	Niagara (ON), Erie (NY)	ON, NY	42.8889°N 78.9303°W	16:40–16:51	3.23 mi (5.20 km)	300 yd (270 m)
EF1	A weak tornado began in Canada, inflicting weak damage to trees. The tornado then crossed the Niagara River and made landfall at LaSalle Park in Buffalo. At the park, multiple large trees were damaged on the south end of it. The first structural damage noted was to the air conditioners on the roofs of apartments, townhouses, and other multi-story buildings. Significant loss of roofing material was also noted. Several chimneys were toppled from homes on the northern side of the downtown area. Continuing eastward, multiple trees were snapped at Johnson Park with some of their limbs being found further east. The final observed damage was two cars overturned and some minor roof damage right where the tornado lifted.						
EF1	SSE of Sveadahl to NNW of St. James	Watonwan	MN	44.0413°N 94.7223°W	22:26–22:33	2.26 mi (3.64 km)	50 yd (46 m)
EF1	This tornado uprooted trees, damaged power poles, and caused non-continuous crop damage.						
EF1	NNE of St. Clair to S of Janesville	Blue Earth, Waseca	MN	44.1281°N 93.8133°W	23:19–23:33	6.1 mi (9.8 km)	150 yd (140 m)
EF1	A garage door was blown in, an empty farm trailer was tipped over, a couple power poles were downed, and numerous trees were uprooted and snapped.						
EF1	NNE of Otisco	Waseca	MN	44.0113°N 93.4954°W	23:58–00:00	1.45 mi (2.33 km)	75 yd (69 m)
EF1	Multiple large trees were snapped or uprooted, including one of which fell on a power line.						
EFU	ESE of Emmons	Worth	IA	43.4843°N 93.3189°W	00:07–00:08	0.28 mi (0.45 km)	20 yd (18 m)
EFU	A brief tornado remained over open cropland.						
EF0	SSW of Wells to S of Baroda	Faribault	MN	43.7324°N 93.7427°W	00:28–00:42	4.84 mi (7.79 km)	50 yd (46 m)
EF0	A tornado uprooted trees and downed large treelimbs halfway up the base. One fallen limb damaged the roof of a house. Crop damage was also observed.						
EFU	WNW of Carpenter	Worth	IA	43.4269°N 93.0766°W	00:43–00:44	0.12 mi (0.19 km)	20 yd (18 m)
EFU	This brief tornado was observed by storm spotters as it remained over open cropland.						
EFU	WNW of Carpenter	Worth	IA	43.4289°N 93.0595°W	00:43–00:47	1.59 mi (2.56 km)	30 yd (27 m)
EFU	A tornado that looped through a farm field was observed by storm chasers. No damage occurred.						
EF1	NNW of Emmons to SE of Twin Lakes	Freeborn	MN	43.5315°N 93.5279°W	00:50–01:06	6.51 mi (10.48 km)	150 yd (140 m)
EF1	Outbuildings were heavily damaged and a silo was lofted towards a tree line. Trees were uprooted and snapped as well.						
EF0	SSE of Brownsdale to SW of Renova	Mower	MN	43.68°N 92.83°W	01:18–01:20	1.01 mi (1.63 km)	30 yd (27 m)
EF0	A brief tornado stayed mostly in open farm fields and caused light damage to one farmstead.						
EF1	Isle of Palms	Charleston	SC	32.7892°N 79.7773°W	01:33–01:37	0.71 mi (1.14 km)	75 yd (69 m)
EF1	This tornado was likely a waterspout over the Atlantic Ocean before moving onto land where it immediately caused minor damage to the roof of a house and also pulled the home's front door out of frame. The tornado continued north-northwest, damaging a few windows and snapping or uprooting some trees. Shingles were removed from portions of roofs of a few homes. The tornado lifted over the Intracoastal Waterway just to the east of the Isle of Palms Connector Bridge.						
EF1	Eastern Edisto Beach	Colleton, Charleston	SC	32.5023°N 80.2962°W	01:35–01:45	2.89 mi (4.65 km)	300 yd (270 m)
EF1	A waterspout moved onshore on the extreme eastern of Edisto Beach, removing roof decking, shingles, and siding to several homes. A nearby gas station also had some roof damage and air conditioning units ripped from its windows. The tornado exited town and entered Edisto Beach State Park, snapping and uprooting numerous trees in the park. The tornado exited the park and struck a small community, removing the entire roof off of at least three homes and part of the roof decking of at least one. The tornado continued northwest, dissipating over marshland. More damage likely occurred but wasn't documented as of now due to limited to survey.						
EF0	SSW of Grand Meadow	Mower	MN	43.63°N 92.62°W	01:43–01:50	2.72 mi (4.38 km)	70 yd (64 m)
EF0	Minor structural damage occurred to a house and some tree damage was also noted.						
EF1	Edisto Beach	Colleton	SC	32.479°N 80.3307°W	02:08–02:11	0.56 mi (0.90 km)	90 yd (82 m)
EF1	A second tornado struck Edisto Beach, this time in the main town area. It moved onshore, snapping and twisting some small trees and removing shingles from at least one home. The tornado then intensified, collapsing the porch of a home and significantly damaging a portion of its roof. The tornado continued northwestward through town, causing more minor damage to homes before dissipating at a golf course.						
EF0	Kiawah Island	Charleston	SC	32.6035°N 80.074°W	02:55–02:59	1.18 mi (1.90 km)	150 yd (140 m)
EF0	This high-end EF0 tornado was originally a waterspout over the Atlantic Ocean before moving onshore and impacting a golf course. Trees and limbs were snapped throughout the center of the golf course. The tornado continued north, uprooting and snapping some more trees before dissipating over marshland.						
EF0	SSW of Burr Oak	Winneshiek	IA	43.392°N 91.893°W	02:57–02:58	0.33 mi (0.53 km)	30 yd (27 m)
EF0	This brief tornado damaged several trees.						
EF0	NNE of Decorah	Winneshiek	IA	43.39°N 91.77°W	03:11–03:14	0.98 mi (1.58 km)	80 yd (73 m)
EF0	A high-end EF0 tornado that was embedded in a downburst damaged trees, crops and an outbuilding.						
EF1	S of Hanover	Allamakee	IA	43.34°N 91.56°W	03:29–03:38	3.8 mi (6.1 km)	50 yd (46 m)
EF1	This tornado mainly damaged trees along its path but one home and several vehicles and outbuildings were damaged as well.						

=== August 6 event ===
Events in South Carolina and North Carolina are associated with Hurricane Debby.

List of confirmed tornadoes – Tuesday, August 6, 2024
EF#	Location	County / Parish	State	Start Coord.	Time (UTC)	Path length	Max width
EF0	Western Charleston	Charleston	SC	32.8°N 80.035°W	04:14–04:22	3.84 mi (6.18 km)	200 yd (180 m)
EF0	This tornado began just to the northwest of Citadel Mall, damaging small tree limbs. The tornado continued northwest snapping and uprooting several trees within the West Ashley district of Charleston before lifting.						
EF0	Saint Helena Island	Beaufort	SC	32.3736°N 80.5253°W	04:41–04:43	0.85 mi (1.37 km)	60 yd (55 m)
EF0	A weak tornado broke a flag pole at its base and caused minor damage to a mobile home. A few trees and tree limbs were snapped and uprooted as well.						
EF0	Lady's Island	Beaufort	SC	32.4393°N 80.6085°W	04:53–04:56	2.14 mi (3.44 km)	60 yd (55 m)
EF0	A short-lived, high-end EF0 tornado moved across marshlands on Lady's Island, inflicting damage to several trees.						
EF1	Northeastern Moncks Corner to Pinopolis	Berkeley	SC	33.2079°N 79.9807°W	06:53–07:00	3.88 mi (6.24 km)	150 yd (140 m)
EF1	A tornado began in the northeastern side of Moncks Corner, snapping trees in a commercial area. The windows of an Arby's were blown out and the rooftop air conditioning unit was tossed into the parking lot. The nearby Walmart also sustained minor roof fascia damage. The tornado continued northwest, uprooting several trees and a few large branches snapped. The tornado then crossed onto Lake Moultrie before landfalling into Pinopolis, causing some more tree damage before finally lifting.						
EF2	E of Marcellus to northern Three Rivers	St. Joseph	MI	42.0333°N 85.7616°W	12:19–12:33	8.46 mi (13.62 km)	700 yd (640 m)
EF2	This low-end EF2 tornado began on the eastern side of the Cass-St. Joseph county line. The tornado significantly damaged trees and power poles almost immediately as it was moving southeast. The tornado then caused a well-anchored manufactured home to slide off its foundation and significantly damaged nearby trees. A barn was completely destroyed and another barn had its entire roof ripped off and tossed. As the tornado reached peak intensity, another barn roof suffered significant damage to its roof, a home had its roof partially removed, and major tree damage occurred. The tornado continued to track southeast, overturning and twisting center pivots, snapping power poles, and inflicting minor to moderate roof damage to more homes. A well-constructed shed was moved a short distance from its foundation and part of it was thrown into a nearby river. The tornado then entered the northside of Three Rivers, causing minor damage to the roof of a warehouse before the tornado lifted.						
EF1	Northwestern Avon to Rocky River	Lorain, Cuyahoga	OH	41.4768°N 82.0628°W	19:41–19:56	11.93 mi (19.20 km)	200 yd (180 m)
EF1	This high-end EF1 tornado touched down on the northwest side of Avon then proceeded to Avon Lake, snapping multiple trees and lofting a trampoline from a backyard. The tornado continued eastward, snapping multiple trees and removing shingles from a roof. Sporadic tree damage occurred as the tornado entered Bay Village. Widespread tree damage continued with structures also being damaged in town. One roof was crushed by a fallen tree and a front porch was also damaged. The tornado then moved into Rocky River where a large tree fell onto two brick homes, heavily damaging both of them. The tornado dissipated just before reaching the West Branch Rocky River.						
EF1	Bay Village to Westlake	Cuyahoga	OH	41.4909°N 81.9413°W	19:54–19:56	1.75 mi (2.82 km)	250 yd (230 m)
EF1	This short-lived tornado caused extensive tree damage, some of which affected some structures. The tornado's path crossed the path of the simultaneous Avon – Rocky River tornado.						
EF1	Brook Park to Seven Hills to Bedford	Cuyahoga	OH	41.3968°N 81.8325°W	19:59–20:24	17 mi (27 km)	350 yd (320 m)
EF1	A tornado began to the east of Cleveland Hopkins International Airport where it immediately tore off a portion of a metal roof at a recreation center in Brook Park. Numerous trees landed on homes, cars, and took down power lines. A garage with metal siding collapsed and a nearby patio covering was also destroyed. Damage continued into the suburbs of Parma Heights and Parma where numerous power poles were leaning and partially down in yards and near homes. The tornado continued intermittently into Seven Hills and Independence, inflicting minor damage. Damage intensified again after crossing the Cuyahoga River into Valley View, where several large trees were uprooted, some of them falling onto homes. Strips of siding were torn off of many homes in this area as well. The tornado then entered Bedford where another neighborhood saw significant damage occur. Trees were downed on several homes, including one home which had a portion of its roof ripped off and damage to its chimney. A new, strongly secured shed was obliterated here as well. The tornado then weakened before lifting just after crossing east of I-480/I-271.						
EF0	SW of Longwood	Brunswick	NC	33.9782°N 78.5899°W	20:09–20:12	0.33 mi (0.53 km)	40 yd (37 m)
EF0	Several trees were uprooted and snapped along the driveway of a property. Minor damage occurred to fencing and a panel of roof of a nearby house as well.						
EF1	Southern Brecksville to N of Peninsula	Summit	OH	41.2767°N 81.6146°W	20:20–20:25	3.32 mi (5.34 km)	150 yd (140 m)
EF1	This tornado first struck a warehouse, removing the east end of the building's roof. Eleven empty semi-truck trailers were blown over nearby as well. The tornado tracked southeastward, intermittently damaging trees and power poles in the Cuyahoga Valley National Park. The tornado lifted just before crossing I-80.						
EF1	Western Kirtland to NE of Chesterland	Lake, Geauga	OH	41.5821°N 81.3907°W	20:31–20:38	4.79 mi (7.71 km)	200 yd (180 m)
EF1	A high-end EF1 tornado caused extensive tree damage with a few trees damaging some houses.						
EFU	E of Hermitage	Mercer	PA	41.23°N 80.41°W	21:30	0.03 mi (0.048 km)	20 yd (18 m)
EFU	This landspout tornado was photographed but no known damage could be found.						

=== August 7 event ===
Events are associated with Hurricane Debby.

List of confirmed tornadoes – Wednesday, August 7, 2024
EF#	Location	County / Parish	State	Start Coord.	Time (UTC)	Path length	Max width
EF2	S of Harrells	Pender, Sampson	NC	34.683°N 78.1475°W	18:09–18:20	4.67 mi (7.52 km)	400 yd (370 m)
EF2	This small but strong low-end EF2 tornado ripped part of the roof off of one home, shattered windows of another home, removed roofing off a mobile home, flattened corn, and uprooted or snapped trees.						
EF0	Maple Hill	Pender	NC	34.6617°N 77.6903°W	18:43–18:45	1.79 mi (2.88 km)	35 yd (32 m)
EF0	This tornado downed numerous large tree limbs and snapped a tree.						

=== August 8 event ===
Events are associated with Hurricane Debby.

List of confirmed tornadoes – Thursday, August 8, 2024
EF#	Location	County / Parish	State	Start Coord.	Time (UTC)	Path length	Max width
EF2	Western Snow Hill to NE of Faro	Greene	NC	35.4448°N 77.6878°W	06:08–06:25	9.48 mi (15.26 km)	400 yd (370 m)
EF2	This tornado first started on the west side of Snow Hill, causing significant damage to a wooden billboard and some minor damage to trees. The tornado moved northwest, damaging several barns, carports, outbuildings, and a house. Parallel to NC 58, a mobile home was destroyed, multiple wooden power poles were snapped, a barn was destroyed, and a pickup truck was rolled several yards. The tornado continued northwest as it snapped numerous trees at their base, with minor damage occurring to outbuildings and a home in the area. The tornado then intensified, significantly damaging farm buildings and a garage. Numerous trees were snapped at their base nearby as well. This tornado possibly continued into Wilson and/or Wayne counties, so additional surveying will be ongoing.						
EF3	NNE of Lucama	Wilson	NC	35.6527°N 77.9637°W	06:45–06:54	6.5 mi (10.5 km)	200 yd (180 m)
EF3	1 death – A low-end EF3 tornado began to the northeast of Lucama, snapping numerous trees and severely damaging several homes. The roof covering of a home was completely removed in this area. The tornado tracked northwest, causing intense damage to a middle school. Multiple sections of the school's roof were completely ripped off and several exterior walls were blown out. After striking the school, the tornado collapsed a two-story house, killing a man. The tornado then destroyed a barn and snapped or uprooted numerous trees before lifting shortly after crossing I-95.						
EF1	ENE of Louisburg	Franklin	NC	36.09°N 78.17°W	12:07–12:13	2.9 mi (4.7 km)	125 yd (114 m)
EF1	This tornado snapped and uprooted numerous trees.						
EF0	NNE of Nashville	Nash	NC	36.1°N 77.94°W	14:35–14:36	0.22 mi (0.35 km)	50 yd (46 m)
EF0	A high-end EF0 tornado uprooted several trees.						
EF0	Rocky Ford	Franklin	NC	36.2°N 78.33°W	19:29–19:30	1 mi (1.6 km)	75 yd (69 m)
EF0	A high-end EF0 tornado snapped a utility pole and snapped or uprooted several trees.						
EF0	Southeastern Rocky Mount	Edgecombe	NC	35.93°N 77.76°W	21:04–21:05	0.16 mi (0.26 km)	50 yd (46 m)
EF0	This high-end EF0 tornado snapped and uprooted a few trees. Crop damage also occurred in a nearby field.						
EF1	SW of Ladysmith	Caroline	VA	37.9741°N 77.5210°W	22:54–22:59	1.72 mi (2.77 km)	700 yd (640 m)
EF1	This tornado snapped and uprooted several trees and damaged the roofs and siding of numerous homes. Power lines and trees also fell onto some homes.						
EF1	E of Epsom	Franklin, Vance	NC	36.24°N 78.32°W	23:00–23:04	1.58 mi (2.54 km)	100 yd (91 m)
EF1	A tornado completely destroyed a mobile home and snapped or uprooted several trees.						
EF1	NW of Stanton	New Castle	DE	39.7246°N 75.6511°W	23:11–23:13	1.13 mi (1.82 km)	150 yd (140 m)
EF1	A store at a strip mall lost a portion of its roof and damage occurred to a light pole. Several trees were uprooted and snapped as well.						
EF1	NW of Glendie to W of Heflin	Stafford	VA	38.4097°N 77.5131°W	23:49–00:01	6.92 mi (11.14 km)	150 yd (140 m)
EF1	A tornado snapped and uprooted multiple large trees. One tree fell onto a home, damaging the roof and garage, and another tree fell onto a different structure.						
EF1	N of Willisville to SW of Bluemont	Loudoun, Clarke	VA	39.0202°N 77.831°W	01:19–01:30	4.76 mi (7.66 km)	100 yd (91 m)
EF1	This tornado damaged several trees by uprooting or snapping them along its path.						
EF0	Hedgesville	Berkeley	WV	39.551°N 78.111°W	03:50–03:51	0.49 mi (0.79 km)	150 yd (140 m)
EF0	A weak tornado tracked through Hedgesville, uprooting and/or snapping numerous trees. Several large branches were downed as well.						

=== August 9 event ===
Events in Pennsylvania and New York are associated with Hurricane Debby.

List of confirmed tornadoes – Friday, August 9, 2024
EF#	Location	County / Parish	State	Start Coord.	Time (UTC)	Path length	Max width
EF1	Eastern Harrisburg to northwestern Progress	Dauphin	PA	40.2457°N 76.8473°W	09:33–09:40	3.48 mi (5.60 km)	300 yd (270 m)
EF1	This high-end EF1 tornado began in eastern Harrisburg, blowing in doors at a warehouse. The tornado moved north, causing sporadic tree damage before significantly damaging the roof of a church. A nearby house had its roof partially blown off and several trees uprooted nearby. Further north, a couple houses sustained severe roof and structural damage from fallen trees. Tree damage also occurred on the property of the National Civil War Museum before lifting near the Pennsylvania State Police headquarters.						
EF0	SE of New Paltz	Ulster	NY	41.7256°N 74.0708°W	21:51–21:52	0.58 mi (0.93 km)	30 yd (27 m)
EF0	A weak tornado was recorded uprooting a few trees.						
EF1	NNE of Cripple Creek	Teller	CO	38.8°N 105.14°W	22:08–22:09	0.92 mi (1.48 km)	400 yd (370 m)
EF1	This tornado occurred at 10,050 ft (3,060 m) of elevation to the southwest of Pikes Peak. Numerous trees were snapped, uprooted, and twisted, and a window was broken on a home.						

=== August 11 event ===
List of confirmed tornadoes – Sunday, August 11, 2024
EF#	Location	County / Parish	State	Start Coord.	Time (UTC)	Path length	Max width
EF0	SW of Gouverneur	St. Lawrence	NY	44.2754°N 75.5144°W	18:18–18:19	0.13 mi (0.21 km)	20 yd (18 m)
EF0	A brief tornado was recorded and photographed. Minor damage was noted.						
EFU	NW of Vernon	Yuma	CO	39.9512°N 102.3129°W	22:41–22:43	0.46 mi (0.74 km)	25 yd (23 m)
EFU	A storm chaser photographed a shed that was tossed about 75 ft (23 m). The tornado was rated EFU despite the damage because the survey team was unable to tell how structurally sound the shed was before the tornado occurred.						

=== August 14 event ===
List of confirmed tornadoes – Wednesday, August 14, 2024
EF#	Location	County / Parish	State	Start Coord.	Time (UTC)	Path length	Max width
EFU	S of Duncan	Polk	NE	41.32°N 97.5°W	06:06–06:07	0.1 mi (0.16 km)	15 yd (14 m)
EFU	A deputy photographed a brief tornado.						
EFU	N of Fostoria	Pottawatomie	KS	39.533°N 96.543°W	00:25–00:26	0.48 mi (0.77 km)	20 yd (18 m)
EFU	A storm chaser photographed a ragged funnel that appeared to be on the ground. No damage was reported.						
EFU	W of Blaine	Pottawatomie	KS	39.506°N 96.441°W	00:39–00:40	0.01 mi (0.016 km)	15 yd (14 m)
EFU	Photos posted on social media showed a small, brief tornado occurring for less than a minute.						

=== August 15 event ===
List of confirmed tornadoes – Thursday, August 15, 2024
EF#	Location	County / Parish	State	Start Coord.	Time (UTC)	Path length	Max width
EF1	ESE of Centerville to SW of Toulon	Stark	IL	41.04°N 89.98°W	04:06–04:12	3.2 mi (5.1 km)	50 yd (46 m)
EF1	This tornado snapped trees and moved through farm fields, damaging crops.						

=== August 19 event ===
List of confirmed tornadoes – Monday, August 19, 2024
EF#	Location	County / Parish	State	Start Coord.	Time (UTC)	Path length	Max width
EFU	E of Leader	Adams	CO	39.89°N 103.83°W	20:04–20:07	0.56 mi (0.90 km)	20 yd (18 m)
EFU	A landspout tornado occurred over an open field.						
EFU	NNE of Deer Trail	Adams	CO	39.75°N 103.99°W	20:55–21:01	0.87 mi (1.40 km)	25 yd (23 m)
EFU	Multiple storm spotters reported a nearly stationary tornado.						
EF1	SSW of Alva	Crook	WY	44.5776°N 104.4974°W	00:12–00:22	2.51 mi (4.04 km)	300 yd (270 m)
EF1	A high-end EF1 tornado touched down east of Devils Tower in the Black Hills National Forest, where numerous pine trees were either uprooted or snapped.						

=== August 21 event ===
List of confirmed tornadoes – Wednesday, August 21, 2024
EF#	Location	County / Parish	State	Start Coord.	Time (UTC)	Path length	Max width
EF0	SE of Sanford	Seminole	FL	28.74°N 81.21°W	15:18–15:27	1.28 mi (2.06 km)	5 yd (4.6 m)
EF0	A waterspout occurred and remained over Lake Jesup.						
EFU	NNW of Pomerene	Cochise	AZ	32.08°N 110.32°W	23:31	0.25 mi (0.40 km)	75 yd (69 m)
EFU	A storm chaser observed a tornado.						

=== August 22 event ===
List of confirmed tornadoes – Thursday, August 22, 2024
EF#	Location	County / Parish	State	Start Coord.	Time (UTC)	Path length	Max width
EFU	E of Burlington	Kit Carson	CO	39.319°N 102.198°W	23:59–00:03	1.83 mi (2.95 km)	15 yd (14 m)
EFU	A tornado was photographed crossing I-70. No damage was observed.						
EFU	ESE of Burlington to WSW of Kanorado	Kit Carson	CO	39.29°N 102.162°W	00:06–00:11	1.6 mi (2.6 km)	15 yd (14 m)
EFU	This tornado was observed over open fields.						

=== August 26 event ===
List of confirmed tornadoes – Monday, August 26, 2024
EF#	Location	County / Parish	State	Start Coord.	Time (UTC)	Path length	Max width
EFU	Donna	Hidalgo	TX	26.174°N 98.052°W	19:18–19:25	0.2 mi (0.32 km)	20 yd (18 m)
EFU	A landspout tornado was reported.						
EFU	N of Essig	Brown	MN	44.3594°N 94.6182°W	23:24–23:25	0.33 mi (0.53 km)	25 yd (23 m)
EFU	A storm chaser recorded a tornado moving through open fields.						

=== August 28 event ===
List of confirmed tornadoes – Wednesday, August 28, 2024
EF#	Location	County / Parish	State	Start Coord.	Time (UTC)	Path length	Max width
EFU	NE of Trinity	Pasco	FL	28.2°N 82.62°W	20:40–20:41	0.09 mi (0.14 km)	10 yd (9.1 m)
EFU	A photo was posted on social media of a brief tornado.						
EF1	S of Selfridge	Sioux	ND	46°N 100.95°W	22:41–22:51	2.19 mi (3.52 km)	300 yd (270 m)
EF1	This tornado broke three old wooden power poles.						
EFU	SE of Selfridge	Sioux	ND	45.99°N 100.84°W	23:07–23:22	4.6 mi (7.4 km)	620 yd (570 m)
EFU	A tornado, not documented by the National Weather Service, was observed via radar and left a well-defined ground mark in fields. It followed a cyclonic loop pattern and damaged a structure, likely a barn, which was later confirmed in satellite imagery. As it moved south, it threw hay bales across fields before lifting.						
EF1	E of Steele	Kidder	ND	46.8516°N 99.8978°W	00:53–00:55	0.86 mi (1.38 km)	300 yd (270 m)
EF1	A tornado damaged oat crops, twisting and downing the plants. The tornado then knocked forty empty train cars off of tracks and uprooted a few trees in a nearby grove.						
EF2	WSW of Mound City	Campbell	SD	45.6837°N 100.2431°W	00:50–01:20	5.42 mi (8.72 km)	200 yd (180 m)
EF2	This strong tornado began in a soybean field where it toppled three electrical transmission towers. The tornado moved to the east-southeast, uprooting and snapping multiple large trees at a farmstead. One small shed was lifted, another shed's walls collapsed, and a machine shed had its doors blown out. The house at the farmstead had windows blown out. A tractor lost its doors and a trailer was rolled. Hay bales were tossed as well.						
EFU	ESE of Mound City	Campbell	SD	45.6884°N 99.9942°W	01:50–01:52	0.87 mi (1.40 km)	20 yd (18 m)
EFU	A tornado was photographed.						

=== August 29 event ===
List of confirmed tornadoes – Thursday, August 29, 2024
EF#	Location	County / Parish	State	Start Coord.	Time (UTC)	Path length	Max width
EFU	NW of Orleans	Dickinson	IA	43.4713°N 95.1034°W	20:05–20:06	0.84 mi (1.35 km)	25 yd (23 m)
EFU	A waterspout was recorded over Big Spirit Lake. It remained over the lake and did not cause damage.						
EF1	SSW of Roaring Spring	Blair	PA	40.3169°N 78.4082°W	20:17–20:20	0.81 mi (1.30 km)	100 yd (91 m)
EF1	This tornado damaged about two dozen trees, snapping and uprooting them. One tree landed on the garage of a repair shop, heavily damaging the shop's roof. A narrow swath of corn in a nearby field was flattened before the tornado dissipated.						
EF1	WNW of Genola to Lastrup	Morrison	MN	45.9688°N 94.168°W	20:35–20:43	7.46 mi (12.01 km)	50 yd (46 m)
EF1	This tornado heavily damaged two barns northwest of Pierz before tracking into Lastrup. In town, dozens of trees were downed and half of the roof of an outbuilding was torn off. The tornado lifted shortly after exiting town.						
EF1	Northern Andover to eastern Oak Grove	Anoka	MN	45.2859°N 93.3083°W	21:26–21:29	3.57 mi (5.75 km)	250 yd (230 m)
EF1	Several trees were snapped or uprooted.						
EF1	Northern Oak Grove to WSW of Weber	Anoka, Isanti	MN	45.3709°N 93.3054°W	21:32–21:43	9.63 mi (15.50 km)	250 yd (230 m)
EF1	Trees were uprooted, a farm outbuilding was destroyed, and another outbuilding sustained roof damage.						
EF0	NNW of Miesville, MN to ESE of Prescott, WI	Dakota (MN), Goodhue (MN), Pierce (WI)	MN, WI	44.6443°N 92.8381°W	22:46–22:57	7.93 mi (12.76 km)	150 yd (140 m)
EF0	A tornado began at a golf course, uprooting several trees. Tree damage continued along the path before lifting to the east of the Mississippi River in Wisconsin, where a trailer was flipped and several more trees were downed or broken.						
EF1	WNW of Beldenville to WNW of Martell	Pierce	WI	44.7859°N 92.5742°W	23:06–23:15	6.65 mi (10.70 km)	50 yd (46 m)
EF1	Trees were uprooted or broken and an outbuilding was damaged.						
EF0	ESE of Woodville to WSW of Wilson	St. Croix	WI	44.9248°N 92.2402°W	23:30–23:33	1.71 mi (2.75 km)	50 yd (46 m)
EF0	A brief tornado damaged several trees as it crossed I-94.						

=== August 30 event ===
List of confirmed tornadoes – Friday, August 30, 2024
EF#	Location	County / Parish	State	Start Coord.	Time (UTC)	Path length	Max width
EF0	NW of Chester	Randolph	IL	37.9389°N 89.8463°W	17:45–17:46	0.08 mi (0.13 km)	20 yd (18 m)
EF0	This brief landspout caused minor damage to two outbuildings and several trees.						

=== August 31 event ===
List of confirmed tornadoes – Saturday, August 31, 2024
EF#	Location	County / Parish	State	Start Coord.	Time (UTC)	Path length	Max width
EF0	N of Frostburg	Somerset	PA	39.737°N 78.9352°W	19:33–19:35	0.66 mi (1.06 km)	50 yd (46 m)
EF0	A weather spotter recorded a high-end EF0 tornado downing several trees and destroying a medium-sized barn.						
EFU	NE of Poplar Bluff	Butler	MO	36.7819°N 90.3494°W	19:44–19:45	0.09 mi (0.14 km)	20 yd (18 m)
EFU	A landspout caused no known damage.						

== September ==
Confirmed tornadoes by Enhanced Fujita rating
EFU	EF0	EF1	EF2	EF3	EF4	EF5	Total
14	40	20	1	1	0	0	76

=== September 2 event ===
List of confirmed tornadoes – Monday, September 2, 2024
EF#	Location	County / Parish	State	Start Coord.	Time (UTC)	Path length	Max width
EFU	Western West Jordan	Salt Lake	UT	40.59°N 112.03°W	23:20	unknown	unknown
EFU	A tornado occurred in an open field.						

=== September 3 event ===
List of confirmed tornadoes – Tuesday, September 3, 2024
EF#	Location	County / Parish	State	Start Coord.	Time (UTC)	Path length	Max width
EF0	Fernandina Beach	Nassau	FL	30.67°N 81.43°W	14:39–14:40	0.08 mi (0.13 km)	25 yd (23 m)
EF0	A waterspout moved ashore on Amelia Island and caused light damage to the roofs of oceanfront homes before quickly dissipating.						

=== September 4 event ===
List of confirmed tornadoes – Wednesday, September 4, 2024
EF#	Location	County / Parish	State	Start Coord.	Time (UTC)	Path length	Max width
EF0	WSW of New Fork	Sublette	WY	42.6375°N 109.8749°W	21:05–21:06	0.06 mi (0.097 km)	10 yd (9.1 m)
EF0	A landspout remained over open country.						

=== September 5 event ===
List of confirmed tornadoes – Thursday, September 5, 2024
EF#	Location	County / Parish	State	Start Coord.	Time (UTC)	Path length	Max width
EF0	ESE of Omega	Kingfisher	OK	35.841°N 98.101°W	18:30	0.1 mi (0.16 km)	10 yd (9.1 m)
EF0	A storm chaser observed a landspout over open land.						

=== September 6 event ===
List of confirmed tornadoes – Friday, September 6, 2024
EF#	Location	County / Parish	State	Start Coord.	Time (UTC)	Path length	Max width
EF1	NNW of Richburg to SE of Friendship	Allegany	NY	42.1349°N 78.176°W	01:34–01:50	5.98 mi (9.62 km)	200 yd (180 m)
EF1	Extensive tree damage was noted in a sporadic path where one tree fell on a residence.						

=== September 7 event ===
List of confirmed tornadoes – Saturday, September 7, 2024
EF#	Location	County / Parish	State	Start Coord.	Time (UTC)	Path length	Max width
EFU	Beverly Shores	Porter	IN	41.7019°N 86.9567°W	11:58–11:59	0.05 mi (0.080 km)	10 yd (9.1 m)
EFU	A waterspout was recorded moving onshore from Lake Michigan and quickly dissipating at Indiana Dunes National Park. No damage was reported.						
EFU	Kingman	Mohave	AZ	35.2272°N 114.0305°W	23:37–23:40	unknown	unknown
EFU	A landspout was photographed in Kingman. No damage was reported.						

=== September 9 event ===
List of confirmed tornadoes – Monday, September 9, 2024
EF#	Location	County / Parish	State	Start Coord.	Time (UTC)	Path length	Max width
EF0	Thermopolis	Hot Springs	WY	43.6457°N 108.2136°W	20:19–20:22	0.19 mi (0.31 km)	25 yd (23 m)
EF0	This landspout occurred in downtown Thermopolis, damaging some sheet metal roofing and windows of vehicles.						
EF0	Grand Island	Erie	NY	43.0333°N 79.0102°W	20:33–20:36	1.2 mi (1.9 km)	75 yd (69 m)
EF0	A waterspout began on the Niagara River and moved ashore into Grand Island. A couple of trees were uprooted with mainly tree limb damage occurring.						
EFU	Worth	Jefferson	NY	43.7565°N 75.8837°W	21:15–21:17	0.1 mi (0.16 km)	50 yd (46 m)
EFU	Using Sentinel-2 satellite imagery, a scar was observed in a very rural area that is inaccessible. No damage survey could be conducted.						
EF0	Pembroke	Genesee	NY	43.0241°N 78.3987°W	00:32–00:34	0.2 mi (0.32 km)	50 yd (46 m)
EF0	This tornado snapped and uprooted several trees and blew down multiple large tree limbs. One home and garage suffered some roof damage due to tree limbs falling on them.						

=== September 11 event ===
List of confirmed tornadoes – Wednesday, September 11, 2024
EF#	Location	County / Parish	State	Start Coord.	Time (UTC)	Path length	Max width
EFU	W of Medley	Miami-Dade	FL	25.9°N 80.53°W	21:19	unknown	unknown
EFU	A landspout was recorded in the Everglades.						

=== September 14 event ===
List of confirmed tornadoes – Saturday, September 14, 2024
EF#	Location	County / Parish	State	Start Coord.	Time (UTC)	Path length	Max width
EFU	SSW of Claude	Armstrong	TX	34.98°N 101.43°W	19:54	unknown	unknown
EFU	A landspout occurred over open land doing no known damage.						
EFU	NE of Lake Tanglewood	Randall	TX	35.12°N 101.72°W	20:36	unknown	unknown
EFU	A landspout occurred over open land doing no known damage.						

=== September 15 event ===
Event is associated with Potential Tropical Cyclone Eight.

List of confirmed tornadoes – Sunday, September 15, 2024
EF#	Location	County / Parish	State	Start Coord.	Time (UTC)	Path length	Max width
EF0	Eastern Bald Head Island	Brunswick	NC	33.8565°N 77.9595°W	15:52–15:54	0.49 mi (0.79 km)	20 yd (18 m)
EF0	A waterspout was recorded moving onshore from the Atlantic Ocean and across marshes in eastern Bald Head Island. No damage was observed.						

=== September 16 event ===
Event is associated with Potential Tropical Cyclone Eight.

List of confirmed tornadoes – Monday, September 16, 2024
EF#	Location	County / Parish	State	Start Coord.	Time (UTC)	Path length	Max width
EF0	Eastern Cape Carteret	Carteret	NC	34.6882°N 77.0432°W	23:26–23:27	0.35 mi (0.56 km)	60 yd (55 m)
EF0	Mainly minor tree damage occurred, but one home had shingles from the roof of a well-pump house removed and light metal flashing torn off the side of the house.						

=== September 18 event ===
List of confirmed tornadoes – Wednesday, September 18, 2024
EF#	Location	County / Parish	State	Start Coord.	Time (UTC)	Path length	Max width
EFU	N of Devils Lake	Ramsey	ND	48.2081°N 98.9087°W	01:38	0.12 mi (0.19 km)	10 yd (9.1 m)
EFU	A storm chaser recorded a brief tornado that lasted less than a minute.						

=== September 19 event ===
List of confirmed tornadoes – Thursday, September 19, 2024
EF#	Location	County / Parish	State	Start Coord.	Time (UTC)	Path length	Max width
EF1	N of Canyon to W of Whiteface	St. Louis	MN	47.0981°N 92.4726°W	22:05–22:18	5.9 mi (9.5 km)	200 yd (180 m)
EF1	This high-end EF1 tornado began just west of US-53, snapping pine trees at their base. The tornado crossed the road and intensified, snapping and uprooting numerous pine and aspen trees. Minor to moderate structure damage occurred in the area as well. The tornado uprooted a few more trees before lifting after entering the Cloquet Valley State Forest.						

=== September 21 event ===
List of confirmed tornadoes – Saturday, September 21, 2024
EF#	Location	County / Parish	State	Start Coord.	Time (UTC)	Path length	Max width
EFU	NW of Clines Corners	Torrance	NM	35.023°N 105.69°W	20:13–20:16	1.09 mi (1.75 km)	50 yd (46 m)
EFU	A tornado was reported north of Clines Corners but no damage was found.						
EFU	NNW of Nazareth	Castro	TX	34.6021°N 102.1306°W	23:45–23:47	1.27 mi (2.04 km)	50 yd (46 m)
EFU	This tornado was recorded in an open field did not cause any damage.						

=== September 22 event ===
List of confirmed tornadoes – Sunday, September 22, 2024
EF#	Location	County / Parish	State	Start Coord.	Time (UTC)	Path length	Max width
EF0	Northern Yorktown	Delaware	IN	40.2125°N 85.4942°W	23:39–23:40	0.07 mi (0.11 km)	10 yd (9.1 m)
EF0	A pole barn was heavily damaged.						
EFU	NNE of Blaine	Jay	IN	40.427°N 85.0383°W	23:42–23:44	0.21 mi (0.34 km)	50 yd (46 m)
EFU	A small tornado occurred in a corn field. No damage occurred.						
EF1	NE of Blaine to western Portland	Jay	IN	40.4274°N 85.0274°W	23:45–23:51	2.74 mi (4.41 km)	75 yd (69 m)
EF1	This high-end EF1 tornado struck the local high school, heavily damaging the roof. Several homes nearby and further east into Portland also sustained roof damage. Considerable tree damage also occurred.						

=== September 24 event ===
List of confirmed tornadoes – Tuesday, September 24, 2024
EF#	Location	County / Parish	State	Start Coord.	Time (UTC)	Path length	Max width
EF0	Northern Clarksville to northern Jeffersonville	Clark	IN	38.3493°N 85.7513°W	17:40–17:46	3.88 mi (6.24 km)	100 yd (91 m)
EF0	This tree initially uprooted trees and snapped the tops of others, some of which damaged nearby mobile homes. The mobile homes also had their foundations shifted slightly. Nine power poles were also heavily damaged. A railroad arm was bent and several more trees were damaged before the tornado lifted.						
EF1	SSE of Ligonier to ESE of Topeka	Noble	IN	41.4319°N 85.5737°W	20:13–20:36	7.47 mi (12.02 km)	230 yd (210 m)
EF1	This tornado mainly caused roof damage to farm buildings and houses, the strongest of which ripped the entire roof off of a home and pushed a wall in. Some trees were knocked down or snapped and a large chicken building had its entire outer shell removed.						
EF0	E of Eaton to WNW of West Alexandria	Preble	OH	39.7429°N 84.597°W	20:47–20:50	1.44 mi (2.32 km)	30 yd (27 m)
EF0	A weak tornado caused minor damage to a barn, trees, and some lawn furniture.						
EF1	NNE of Valentinee to SSW of Plato	LaGrange	IN	41.5975°N 85.3706°W	21:01–21:08	1.92 mi (3.09 km)	125 yd (114 m)
EF1	This tornado touched down and initially caused sporadic damage to barns and trees. Eventually, the tornado completely destroyed one farm building by ripping the roof off and knocked down the walls of a nearby chicken housing structure. Two people in a buggy were injured when the buggy was blown over.						
EF0	Northern Mishawaka	St. Joseph	IN	41.7065°N 86.185°W	21:49–21:51	0.29 mi (0.47 km)	125 yd (114 m)
EF0	A weak tornado touched down in the parking lot of a Meijer, downing some tree branches. The tornado tracked east, causing minor tree damage near a Potbelly and a La-Z-Boy furniture store. Minor damage continued and was noted by a Raising Cane's fast food joint before dissipating.						
EF1	ENE of Sneedville to SSE of Kyles Ford	Hancock	TN	36.5432°N 83.1447°W	22:20–22:25	5.98 mi (9.62 km)	250 yd (230 m)
EF1	This high-end EF1 tornado snapped numerous tree trunks and uprooted a few more trees. Some metal roofing pieces were tossed into a field as well. This is the third recorded tornado in Hancock County since reliable records began in 1950.						
EF0	SE of Camden	Hillsdale	MI	41.7376°N 84.7356°W	22:22–22:23	0.11 mi (0.18 km)	50 yd (46 m)
EF0	A very brief tornado minorly damaged two barns.						
EF0	SW of Kipton	Lorain	OH	41.2498°N 82.3328°W	00:04	0.23 mi (0.37 km)	25 yd (23 m)
EF0	This weak tornado ripped metal siding off of a building and blew it across a road.						

=== September 25 event ===
List of confirmed tornadoes – Wednesday, September 25, 2024
EF#	Location	County / Parish	State	Start Coord.	Time (UTC)	Path length	Max width
EF0	ENE of Laurelville to SSW of Sugar Grove	Hocking	OH	39.504°N 82.6291°W	11:47–11:51	1.99 mi (3.20 km)	50 yd (46 m)
EF0	An outbuilding had its roof removed and thrown in multiple directions. Multiple trees were damaged too.						
EF0	N off Clarkesville	Habersham	GA	34.654°N 83.5126°W	19:04–19:06	0.68 mi (1.09 km)	25 yd (23 m)
EF0	A few trees were downed and an outbuilding was destroyed at a sod farm.						
EF0	SW of Union Mills	Rutherford	NC	35.448°N 82.074°W	20:00–20:07	2.03 mi (3.27 km)	40 yd (37 m)
EF0	A weak tornado damaged the roofs of a few outbuildings and a couple of trees.						
EFU	NW of Hillsboro	Pocahontas	WV	38.1402°N 80.2309°W	22:11–22:16	2.21 mi (3.56 km)	10 yd (9.1 m)
EFU	This tornado was recorded and had numerous pictures taken of it as it tracked over rural pastureland causing no damage. This is the first documented tornado to occur in Pocahontas County.						
EFU	SSE of Norman Park	Colquitt	GA	31.23°N 83.65°W	22:35–22:36	0.18 mi (0.29 km)	25 yd (23 m)
EFU	Law enforcement reported a brief tornado with no damage noted.						
EF1	Blowing Rock	Watauga	NC	36.1364°N 81.6769°W	22:38–22:40	0.6 mi (0.97 km)	75 yd (69 m)
EF1	Several trees were snapped or uprooted and a few free-standing tents were blown down.						
EF0	NW of Cleveland	Greenville	SC	35.096°N 82.562°W	22:40–22:44	0.86 mi (1.38 km)	40 yd (37 m)
EF0	A fishing shack was blown across a road and multiple trees were downed.						
EF0	ENE of Golden Gate	Collier	FL	26.202°N 81.515°W	04:54	0.1 mi (0.16 km)	25 yd (23 m)
EF0	Lawn furniture, boat cushions and tree damage was found throughout the area.						

=== September 26 event ===
Events were associated with Hurricane Helene.

List of confirmed tornadoes – Thursday, September 26, 2024
EF#	Location	County / Parish	State	Start Coord.	Time (UTC)	Path length	Max width
EF0	NE of Golden Gate	Collier	FL	26.277°N 81.556°W	05:55	0.1 mi (0.16 km)	25 yd (23 m)
EF0	Multiple trees were down across roads with radar suggesting a tornadic storm moved through the area.						
EF0	Eastern Vidette	Burke	GA	33.0368°N 82.2431°W	09:53–09:57	2.27 mi (3.65 km)	50 yd (46 m)
EF0	This tornado produced tree and powerline damage in and north of Vidette.						
EF0	Daufuskie Island to western Bluffton	Beaufort	SC	32.1046°N 80.8598°W	11:03–11:16	6.47 mi (10.41 km)	150 yd (140 m)
EF0	This tornado snapped multiple trees on Daufuskie Island and in the marshes on the west side of Bluffton.						
EF0	Bluffton	Beaufort	SC	32.2166°N 80.9281°W	11:20–11:22	1.27 mi (2.04 km)	100 yd (91 m)
EF0	Some trees were snapped and uprooted along with sporadic damage to small tree limbs and branches.						
EF0	Northwestern Dundee to Lake Hamilton	Polk	FL	28.03°N 81.64°W	13:20–13:22	1.1 mi (1.8 km)	25 yd (23 m)
EF0	A brief tornado likely touched down in western Dundee near Lake Hamilton, south of US 27. It caused minor damage consisting mostly of tree branches and foliage debris, and a transformer or power line may have been impacted by airborne debris. The tornado crossed a local road and dissipated shortly afterward.						
EF1	SW of Rowesville to W of Edisto	Orangeburg	SC	33.3231°N 80.915°W	14:39–15:03	13.36 mi (21.50 km)	1,100 yd (1,000 m)
EF1	This tornado produced widespread tree damage.						
EF1	NE of Hays	Wilkes	NC	36.2779°N 80.993°W	16:03–16:04	0.4 mi (0.64 km)	75 yd (69 m)
EF1	This tornado blew shingles off a home, tossed multiple roofing panels from a barn and snapped and uprooted multiple trees.						
EF1	SSW of Lodge to eastern Ehrhardt	Colleton, Bamberg	SC	33.0207°N 80.9629°W	16:52–17:11	7.78 mi (12.52 km)	150 yd (140 m)
EF1	A low-end EF1 tornado damaged several trees and their branches.						
EF0	Northeastern Broxton	Coffee	GA	31.6278°N 82.8798°W	18:30–18:33	0.46 mi (0.74 km)	30 yd (27 m)
EF0	Minor structural damage to homes occurred and several trees were downed.						
EF0	NW of Carr	Alamance	NC	36.2266°N 79.2808°W	00:11–00:12	0.26 mi (0.42 km)	50 yd (46 m)
EF0	This tornado downed several trees and blew the shingles off of two homes.						
EF1	S of Glenwood	Wheeler	GA	32.0583°N 82.6513°W	00:56–00:58	0.69 mi (1.11 km)	75 yd (69 m)
EF1	2 deaths – This EF1 tornado completely destroyed an unanchored mobile home, killing two people.						
EF0	ESE of Summerton	Clarendon	SC	33.5577°N 80.2287°W	02:17–02:18	1.31 mi (2.11 km)	50 yd (46 m)
EF0	A brief tornado produced minor tree damage on the northeastern side of Lake Marion.						
EF1	W of Wells to SE of Sandy Run	Orangeburg, Calhoun	SC	33.388°N 80.5684°W	04:33–05:17	33.4 mi (53.8 km)	800 yd (730 m)
EF1	This long-track EF1 tornado damaged numerous trees across the two counties.						

=== September 27 event ===
Events were associated with Hurricane Helene.

List of confirmed tornadoes – Friday, September 27, 2024
EF#	Location	County / Parish	State	Start Coord.	Time (UTC)	Path length	Max width
EF0	W of Reevesville to N of Rowesville	Orangeburg	SC	33.223°N 80.7256°W	05:15–05:28	13.77 mi (22.16 km)	500 yd (460 m)
EF0	This high-end EF0 tornado only damaged trees.						
EF0	NE of Lobeco to E of Sheldon	Beaufort	SC	32.5681°N 80.7162°W	05:29–05:32	3.87 mi (6.23 km)	175 yd (160 m)
EF0	A weak tornado uprooted and snapped a few trees.						
EF1	E of North to E of Gaston	Calhoun, Lexington	SC	33.6433°N 80.9454°W	05:51–06:06	13.71 mi (22.06 km)	710 yd (650 m)
EF1	This tornado damaged several trees.						
EF0	Western Charleston	Charleston	SC	32.8001°N 80.095°W	08:00–08:03	2.02 mi (3.25 km)	90 yd (82 m)
EF0	This tornado damaged several large branches and snapped at least two trees on the west side of Charleston.						
EF0	Wadmalaw Island	Charleston	SC	32.6555°N 80.1767°W	08:06–08:09	2.1 mi (3.4 km)	125 yd (114 m)
EF0	A tornado touched down in a marshy area of Wadmalaw Island and moved due north uprooting several large trees. A power pole was also pushed to the ground due to one of the trees falling on it.						
EF0	NNW of Reevesville to ESE of Wilkinson Heights	Orangeburg	SC	33.2558°N 80.6651°W	08:17–08:29	17.04 mi (27.42 km)	800 yd (730 m)
EF0	A weak but long-track tornado damaged several trees.						
EF0	Eastern Hollywood	Charleston	SC	32.7925°N 80.1404°W	08:20–08:22	1.96 mi (3.15 km)	90 yd (82 m)
EF0	A weak tornado tilted two power poles, uprooted a tree, and damaged tree branches.						
EF1	N of Rockville	Charleston	SC	32.6094°N 80.2016°W	08:40–08:43	2.49 mi (4.01 km)	150 yd (140 m)
EF1	This tornado likely began as a waterspout before moving ashore over inaccessible marshland. The first damage noted from the tornado was several large trees that were downed and snapped. Tree damage continued until the tornado dissipated.						
EF0	NE of Eutawville	Orangeburg	SC	33.4088°N 80.3067°W	08:56–08:56	1.53 mi (2.46 km)	180 yd (160 m)
EF0	A brief tornado minorly damaged trees.						
EF0	Stateburg	Sumter	SC	33.9291°N 80.4901°W	09:32–09:38	4.56 mi (7.34 km)	1,000 yd (910 m)
EF0	This weak but large tornado uprooted multiple trees and snapped large branches southwest of Shaw Air Force Base. The tornado moved into Stateburg, continuing to do damage to trees, some of which damaged homes and powerlines.						
EF0	NE of Santee	Clarendon	SC	33.5197°N 80.4321°W	09:36–09:37	0.29 mi (0.47 km)	50 yd (46 m)
EF0	A brief and weak tornado touched down east of I-95 and crossed over it, causing minor tree damage.						
EF0	SW of Spring Gully	Georgetown	SC	33.3248°N 79.4946°W	10:04–10:06	2.42 mi (3.89 km)	20 yd (18 m)
EF0	This tornado uprooted and snapped multiple trees and downed several tree limbs.						
EFU	W of Pawleys Island	Georgetown	SC	33.4212°N 79.2157°W	10:53–10:59	5.5 mi (8.9 km)	
EFU	A tornado began west of the Waccamaw River and traveled across uninhabited marshland. No damage could be accessed so it was given an unknown rating.						
EF0	ESE of Gresham	Marion, Horry	SC	33.8512°N 79.2757°W	11:23–11:26	3.89 mi (6.26 km)	20 yd (18 m)
EF0	A weak tornado produced minor tree damage.						
EF0	ENE of Gresham to SSW of Rains	Marion	SC	33.9542°N 79.34°W	11:30–11:36	6.68 mi (10.75 km)	20 yd (18 m)
EF0	A few trees were snapped and numerous small tree limbs were broken.						
EF0	NNE of White Lake to SSW of Garland	Bladen	NC	34.6864°N 78.4478°W	15:17–15:22	4.99 mi (8.03 km)	30 yd (27 m)
EF0	This tornado snapped several pine trees and a few tree limbs from a large oak tree.						
EF1	SW of Garland to W of Ingold	Bladen, Sampson	NC	34.7618°N 78.4417°W	15:22–15:30	4.86 mi (7.82 km)	100 yd (91 m)
EF1	Numerous trees and large tree limbs were snapped. Some power lines were downed and minor roof damage also occurred.						
EF3	Northern Rocky Mount	Nash	NC	35.9744°N 77.7994°W	17:30–17:33	0.25 mi (0.40 km)	100 yd (91 m)
EF3	This brief but intense low-end EF3 tornado crossed US 301 on the north side of Rocky Mount. It blew over all but one of the exterior walls on an auto repair shop and completely leveled a nearby brick building. Many of the surrounding buildings were damaged by the bricks from the heavily damaged buildings being hurled into them from the tornado. Dozens of vehicles, including several large trucks, were picked up and tossed around. Fifteen people were injured.						
EF2	WSW of Dry Fork to W of Chatham	Pittsylvania	VA	36.73°N 79.47°W	18:38–18:56	6.85 mi (11.02 km)	225 yd (206 m)
EF2	A strong tornado damaged around thirty structures, including one mobile home that was completely destroyed. Numerous trees were snapped and uprooted. One injury occurred.						
EF1	E of Stoneville	Rockingham	NC	36.44°N 79.82°W	19:25–19:27	0.35 mi (0.56 km)	50 yd (46 m)
EF1	Four metal structures were damaged. A few trees were blown down and solar paneling was detached from the roof of a home.						
EF1	SW of Bedford	Bedford	VA	37.3°N 79.57°W	20:11–20:16	1.24 mi (2.00 km)	150 yd (140 m)
EF1	This high-end EF1 tornado snapped and uprooted several trees and caused minor roof damage to a home.						
EF1	NE of Keeling	Pittsylvania	VA	36.747°N 79.238°W	20:44–20:46	0.15 mi (0.24 km)	150 yd (140 m)
EF1	A short-lived tornado blew down several trees.						
EF1	S of Moriah	Durham	NC	36.2201°N 78.8319°W	22:13–22:15	0.6 mi (0.97 km)	50 yd (46 m)
EF1	A roof covering of a large barn was damaged and several trees were snapped or uprooted.						
EF1	E of Oxford	Vance	NC	36.3186°N 78.4885°W	22:33–22:34	0.5 mi (0.80 km)	50 yd (46 m)
EF1	A tornado touched down on top of a large building, ripping the roof and two HVAC units off the building. The tornado then crossed I-85 and move onto the Vance–Granville Community College campus, snapping some trees. The tornado lifted shortly after leaving the north side of the campus.						

== October ==
Confirmed tornadoes by Enhanced Fujita rating
EFU	EF0	EF1	EF2	EF3	EF4	EF5	Total
5	12	27	6	3	0	0	53

=== October 8 event ===
List of confirmed tornadoes – Tuesday, October 8, 2024
EF#	Location	County / Parish	State	Start Coord.	Time (UTC)	Path length	Max width
EF1	Key West	Monroe	FL	24.544°N 81.804°W	03:37–03:39	0.28 mi (0.45 km)	60 yd (55 m)
EF1	A waterspout moved ashore in the Truman Annex neighborhood of Key West. Numerous large tree limbs and a few small trees were snapped along with removed flashing and shingles from the corners of a small apartment complex. A light pole snapped just above its base as well. A dumpster was lofted and tossed into a window at the apartment facility, shattering it. More trees continued to be snapped until the tornado lifted.						

=== October 9 event ===
List of confirmed tornadoes – Wednesday, October 9, 2024
EF#	Location	County / Parish	State	Start Coord.	Time (UTC)	Path length	Max width
EF1	W of Florida City	Miami-Dade	FL	25.4329°N 80.5207°W	08:27–08:40	2.93 mi (4.72 km)	75 yd (69 m)
EF1	Damage from this tornado was limited mainly fences and yards. Several trees were downed.						
EF0	S of Miccosukee Reservation	Miami-Dade	FL	25.7157°N 80.8679°W	12:45–12:49	9.04 mi (14.55 km)	50 yd (46 m)
EF0	A tornadic debris signature was noted on radar and damage was found.						
EFU	W of Miccosukee Reservation to Big Cypress Reservation	Collier, Hendry	FL	26.1261°N 80.8774°W	13:42–14:06	13.52 mi (21.76 km)	50 yd (46 m)
EFU	F-DOT cameras and numerous videos from the public showed a tornado crossing I-75. No damage was found.						
EFU	W of Weston	Broward	FL	26.1268°N 80.5309°W	14:04–14:15	4.69 mi (7.55 km)	50 yd (46 m)
EFU	A storm chaser recorded a tornado over open land. No damage was found.						
EF1	SE of Montura to western Clewiston to SE of Moore Haven	Hendry, Glades	FL	26.5841°N 80.9634°W	14:42–15:20	16.97 mi (27.31 km)	150 yd (140 m)
EF1	A tornado touched down in eastern Hendry County and moved northward, passing through the western portion of Clewiston. Trees were damaged and power lines were downed as the tornado crossed US 27 near the Sky Valley neighborhood. It continued into Glades County, where it moved through sugarcane fields, causing additional tree and crop damage before dissipating.						
EF1	S of Montura to SE of Palmdale	Hendry, Glades	FL	26.4952°N 81.1237°W	15:27–16:11	29.89 mi (48.10 km)	50 yd (46 m)
EF1	Scattered damage occurred to utility poles along a long track. A tornado debris signature was also noted on radar.						
EF0	NE of Belle Glade to SSE of Port Mayaca	Palm Beach	FL	26.7286°N 80.5906°W	15:40–16:08	15.53 mi (24.99 km)	50 yd (46 m)
EF0	Minor tree damage occurred.						
EF1	E of Lakeport to Brighton Reservation	Glades	FL	26.9874°N 81.0846°W	15:44–15:59	6.28 mi (10.11 km)	120 yd (110 m)
EF1	This high-end EF1 tornado began on western Lake Okeechobee before moving ashore, damaging several manufactured homes and vegetation in the area. The tornado tracked northward, rolling an outbuilding off its foundation, snapping a wooden utility pole at its base and damaging several more mobile homes. The tornado continued through fields before entering the Brighton Reservation, crossing through several cattle pastures. Several trees were uprooted or lost their tops in the reservation before the tornado lifted.						
EF0	Punta Rassa	Lee	FL	26.493°N 81.9965°W	15:45–15:47	0.24 mi (0.39 km)	33 yd (30 m)
EF0	A brief tornado occurred in the Jonathan Harbour community, damaging one home, destroying a houseboat and lifting a second pontoon boat onto a dock. The tornado continued into Punta Rassa Cove before dissipating.						
EF1	Matlacha	Lee	FL	26.6281°N 82.0679°W	15:54–15:56	0.91 mi (1.46 km)	100 yd (91 m)
EF1	A waterspout moved onshore in Matlacha causing roof and siding damage to several homes. The worst of the damage was to two homes, one where half of the roof was ripped off and the other was a mobile home that had half the roof ripped off and walls collapse under it. The tornado moved back over water and dissipated.						
EF2	Villas to western Fort Myers to northeastern Cape Coral	Lee	FL	26.5215°N 81.8602°W	16:09–16:41	16.56 mi (26.65 km)	500 yd (460 m)
EF2	This strong, high-end EF2 tornado first caused minor roof damage in Villas before quickly moving into Fort Myers. The tornado then caused scattered tree damage and minor roof damage across the west side of Fort Myers, including removing a large portion of the roof of a home and collapsed a wall on the home's garage. Roof damage was also noted just across the street but was already being repaired at the time of the survey. The track continued across the Fort Myers Country Club with snapped and uprooted trees along with minor to moderate damage to homes. The tornado then crossed the Caloosahatchee River and entered North Fort Myers, producing scattered tree damage before damaging several structures in a manufactured home community. Continuing northward, the tornado intensified as it struck a warehouse. The tornado continued on a north-northwest track, passing through several more neighborhoods in northeastern Cape Coral, producing tree and roof damage. The tornado passed through another manufactured home community, significantly damaging several structures before lifting.						
EF1	SE of Lorida	Highlands	FL	27.362°N 81.205°W	16:37–16:50	6.83 mi (10.99 km)	500 yd (460 m)
EF1	A weak tornado began just to the east of Lake Istokpoga and was recorded and photographed by storm chasers and the public. The tornado moved over mostly rural countryside before damage to several power poles and snapped pine trees was observed. The tornado then peeled large metal roof panels off an outbuilding and buckled its doors, dissipating soon after inflicting the damage.						
EF1	El Jobean	Charlotte	FL	26.9943°N 82.1875°W	16:41–16:43	2.58 mi (4.15 km)	450 yd (410 m)
EF1	This brief tornado originally began as a waterspout on the Myakka River before producing considerable damage in a small community along the river. After moving through, the tornado quickly dissipated.						
EF0	N of North Fort Myers	Charlotte	FL	26.8199°N 81.8348°W	16:54–16:56	0.51 mi (0.82 km)	25 yd (23 m)
EF0	Several trees were uprooted, a camper was overturned and a structure was damage.						
EF2	NW of Okeechobee to E of Fort Basinger	Okeechobee	FL	27.2822°N 80.8798°W	18:04–18:20	8.5 mi (13.7 km)	250 yd (230 m)
EF2	This tornado first lifted a manufactured home off its foundation and threw it over 200 yd (180 m), completely destroying it and injuring two occupants. A nearby steel barn had its metal torn off and the structure twisted. Further along the path, agricultural equipment was overturned and a home experienced partial roof loss, with its roof shifted north and a palm tree snapped in half. Another mobile home was destroyed nearby and a small farm outbuilding collapsed. The tornado then tracked through the Dixie Ranch Acres community, damaging multiple homes on several blocks. The damage mainly consisted of roof and soffit damage along with destroyed outbuildings. One home lost over a fifth of its roofing and significant tree damage was observed nearby. The tornado then moved into open pasture before dissipating.						
EF0	W of Palm City to Port St. Lucie	Martin, St. Lucie	FL	27.127°N 80.384°W	18:05–18:40	17.94 mi (28.87 km)	200 yd (180 m)
EF0	A high-end EF0 tornado touched down in a wooded area south of I-95 and crossed it, flipping a tractor trailer on the interstate. It continued north along the interstate, downing numerous trees. Moving north-northeast, the tornado entered the Rosser Reserve subdivision, causing minor to moderate damage to residential structures. Shingles, soffits, and gutters were the main parts of homes that were damaged here. In the Hidden Oaks neighborhood, a home sustained major damage when part of its roof was peeled back. The tornado weakened as it traveled further north, downing only a few trees and several large branches. A few homes in the Torino neighborhood experienced minor roof and siding damage before the tornado lifted.						
EF1	ENE of Cypress Quarters to S of Fort Drum	Okeechobee	FL	27.2724°N 80.7072°W	18:10–18:39	17.14 mi (27.58 km)	300 yd (270 m)
EF1	This high-end EF1 tornado initially flipped over some irrigation equipment before damaging a home's metal roof, without tearing it off, and toppled nearby trees, including around the entrance to Sunshine Grove, the site of the Okeechobee Music & Arts Festival. It then traveled over mainly undeveloped land with no known damage occurring. The tornado then passed over a commercial farm causing significant roof damage to two small homes and flipped a semi-truck with a flatbed trailer. The most severe damage occurred at the Pine Creek Sporting Club where three well-constructed wood-frame outbuildings were destroyed. Heavy-duty posts on two buildings were sheared off and on the third, posts were ripped from the ground as the roof was lifted, scattering debris northward. An employee reported that a UTV was thrown into an oak tree while nearby cabins sustained only minor damage. The tornado continued northwest, snapping numerous trees before eventually lifting just south of Fort Drum.						
EF2	Sylvan Shores	Highlands	FL	27.3052°N 81.342°W	18:13–18:18	2.87 mi (4.62 km)	300 yd (270 m)
EF2	A high-end EF2 tornado began on the southeastern shore of Lake Clay before moving across the lake and entering a mobile home community on the lake's north side. Approximately 20-30 mobile homes suffered damage, primarily consisting of carports being peeled off or removed along with various degrees of roof and patio damage. A few mobile homes suffered partial wall collapses as a result of their roof being compromised, with one injury occurring in one of those homes. One mobile home was displaced a foot from its supports along with its roof mostly removed and a few walls collapsed. A large number of tree limbs were downed in the park as well. The tornado continued over rural land before dissipating at southern shore of Lake Apthorpe.						
EF0	NW of Big Cypress Reservation (1st tornado)	Hendry	FL	26.4502°N 81.0533°W	18:15–18:17	1.28 mi (2.06 km)	50 yd (46 m)
EF0	Minor tree damage occurred.						
EF1	N of Big Cypress Reservation (2nd tornado)	Hendry	FL	26.4311°N 81.0388°W	18:19–18:21	1.26 mi (2.03 km)	50 yd (46 m)
EF1	A large utility pole was damaged.						
EF1	N of Big Cypress Reservation (3rd tornado)	Hendry	FL	26.419°N 81.0366°W	18:21–18:23	1.74 mi (2.80 km)	50 yd (46 m)
EF1	A high-end EF1 tornado damaged a few trees.						
EF3	NE of Moore Haven to Brighton Reservation	Glades	FL	26.8878°N 81.0381°W	18:24–18:42	15.46 mi (24.88 km)	250 yd (230 m)
EF3	An intense tornado first caused damage in the Sarasota Colony neighborhood in Lakeport, demolishing the second stories of three well-built homes. The tornado then broke the windows of homes, tossed manufactured homes and trailers, flipped a car, and scattered debris in the Fishermans Lane neighborhood. One of the manufactured home's chassis was wrapped around 10 ft (3.0 m) to 15 ft (4.6 m) high around a tree, with its contents found 200 yd (180 m) away in a pond. Three people were injured in this neighborhood. The tornado continued north-northwest, entering the Brighton Seminole Indian Reservation, damaging trees and pulling metal roofing from outbuildings. In the reservation's main village, roof damage occurred to chickee huts and trees. A spectator area and a dugout were also heavily damaged at the village's sport complex, where the tornado ended up lifting behind the baseball fields.						
EF2	NE of Fort Basinger	Okeechobee	FL	27.4318°N 80.9535°W	18:27–18:32	2.64 mi (4.25 km)	100 yd (91 m)
EF2	A tornado began over open pasture before moving through a dairy farm, partially collapsing a large steel barn. Nearby power poles and lines were downed, including a power pole that was snapped. The tornado then moved back over open pasture before dissipating.						
EF1	Venus	Highlands	FL	27.0669°N 81.3478°W	18:30–18:32	0.59 mi (0.95 km)	100 yd (91 m)
EF1	This tornado first damaged several trees, snapping large branches off of them and damaged the garage and roof of a nearby home. The tornado continued tracking north damaging another home and shed and snapping several pine trees while uprooting a few palm trees. A small storage structure was destroyed and multiple long trailers, a pickup truck, and a horse trailer were all overturned at one home. Another residence saw a speedboat tossed into the house after being blown off its trailer. An RV was moved approximately 100 yd (91 m) from a carport at another home, with an ATV at the location also flipped. Damage continued mainly to trees before lifting.						
EF1	S of Placid Lakes	Highlands	FL	27.177°N 81.3519°W	18:42–18:44	0.47 mi (0.76 km)	
EF1	This brief tornado tore half the roof off of the Archbold Biological Station, with some minor damage to the roof of a nearby building before quickly lifting.						
EF0	Western Avon Park	Highlands	FL	27.588°N 81.5156°W	18:47–18:48	0.57 mi (0.92 km)	75 yd (69 m)
EF0	A high-end EF0 tornado damaged the roof of an inn, damaged the awnings of two single-wide trailers, and snapped several large tree limbs along its brief path.						
EF1	N of Fort Drum to ESE of Yeehaw Junction	Okeechobee, Indian River	FL	27.594°N 80.789°W	18:47–19:01	7.76 mi (12.49 km)	100 yd (91 m)
EF1	This tornado struck two solar farms, heavily damaging solar panels at both complexes.						
EF1	S of Bareah	Hardee	FL	27.6276°N 81.617°W	18:49–18:52	0.98 mi (1.58 km)	40 yd (37 m)
EF1	A few trees were snapped.						
EFU	W of Loxahatchee Groves to SE of Indiantown	Palm Beach, Martin	FL	26.7294°N 80.4646°W	18:49–19:11	16.35 mi (26.31 km)	50 yd (46 m)
EFU	A storm chaser witnessed a tornado just north of US 98.						
EFU	NE of Yeehaw Junction	Indian River, Osceola	FL	27.689°N 80.796°W	18:58–19:18	9.6 mi (15.4 km)	50 yd (46 m)
EFU	A tornado debris signature was noted on radar in rural, swampy areas across Indian River and Osceola counties. This tornado was also photographed by a local storm chaser.						
EF1	Port St. Lucie to S of Fort Pierce South	St. Lucie	FL	27.228°N 80.361°W	18:59–19:13	11.8 mi (19.0 km)	150 yd (140 m)
EF1	The tornado initially caused minor residential damage, such as missing shingles and soffit issues, in three subdivisions in Port St. Lucie. It continued northward, producing sporadic tree damage and impacting communities on the northside of Port St. Lucie. The tornado then produced significant structural damage to a metal canopy system at the St. Lucie County Sherriff's Office before lifting shortly after.						
EF1	SW of Lakewood Park to W of Florida Ridge	St. Lucie, Indian River	FL	27.4955°N 80.4156°W	19:05–19:19	11.42 mi (18.38 km)	100 yd (91 m)
EF1	A tornado began near the Meadowood Golf and Tennis Club, downing oak, pine and palm trees. The tornado continued northwestward, uprooting and snapping several pines at low-end EF1 strength. The tornado continued tracking northwestward along I-95, producing minor damage to carports and roofs of a few mobile homes before dissipating after crossing county lines into Indian River County.						
EF1	N of Yeehaw Junction to NE of Kenansville	Indian River, Brevard, Osceola	FL	27.815°N 80.857°W	19:14–19:30	8.2 mi (13.2 km)	150 yd (140 m)
EF1	This tornado began just south of the triple point between the three counties, crossing through all of them before continuing through Osceola County. A notable swath of tree damage occurred, with a large number of pine trees snapped in a heavily wooded area. Minor damage also was inflicted to a barn.						
EF1	NE of Kenansville to N of Holopaw	Osceola	FL	27.9235°N 80.9162°W	19:28–20:07	21 mi (34 km)	150 yd (140 m)
EF1	This rain-wrapped tornado caused a well-constructed barn to collapse and snapped or uprooted numerous trees across rural portions of the county.						
EF1	Vero Beach South to Vero Beach to Gifford	Indian River	FL	27.6178°N 80.3883°W	19:48–19:57	4.51 mi (7.26 km)	150 yd (140 m)
EF1	A tornado initially downed trees before damaging residences and businesses, mainly their roofs. The tornado then struck the Vero Beach Police Department, where surveillance cameras showed several trees and utility poles downed. A mesonet weather station at the station recorded a peak wind gust of 92 mph (148 km/h). Several more trees continued to be downed by the tornado as it tracked northward through neighborhoods, before diminishing in Gifford.						
EF1	Port Salerno	Martin	FL	27.1244°N 80.1938°W	20:03–20:12	3 mi (4.8 km)	250 yd (230 m)
EF1	A tornado touched down and quickly tossed a camper, injuring an occupant. The tornado then moved into the Colonial Heights subdivision, significantly damaging several mobile homes with the main damage being to their carports and roofs, while some of the mobile homes were shifted off their foundations. The tornado entered the New Monrovia neighborhood causing moderate to major damage to many homes, including complete roof loss on several manufactured homes and damaging the roof and vegetation at a middle school. Further north, in the Rocky Point subdivision along the St. Lucie River, numerous houses suffered minor to moderate roof, soffit, and carport damage, with one home experiencing total roof loss. The tornado then moved over the St. Lucie River, becoming a waterspout and dissipated over the river.						
EF1	Vero Beach South to Vero Beach to Gifford	Indian River	FL	27.6233°N 80.3957°W	20:09–20:16	3.44 mi (5.54 km)	100 yd (91 m)
EF1	A second tornado struck the Vero Beach area, starting just west of the previous tornado's track. Damage was limited to trees initially before inflicting more significant damage to structures near the Vero Beach Airport. Several businesses suffered extensive roof loss and numerous trees were uprooted. A large metal warehouse shifted off its foundation as its walls and roof collapsed. The tornado tracked through the airport before lifting just after exiting it.						
EF1	Fort Pierce North to Lakewood Park	St. Lucie	FL	27.4695°N 80.3468°W	20:14–20:24	6.75 mi (10.86 km)	150 yd (140 m)
EF1	This tornado began just north of the Belcher Canal, causing vegetative damage and partial roof loss to a few structures in Fort Pierce North. It then moved nearby the Treasure Coast International Airport airfield, where several small planes were tossed and flipped. The airport's ASOS recorded a wind gust of 60 mph (97 km/h). The tornado then tracked through forested area north of the airport, damaging trees. Substantial damage was observed to a few homes within the Island Pines Golf Club area. Continuing northwest, the tornado entered Lakewood Park, causing damage to mainly carports, porches and awnings. The tornado struck Lakewood Park roughly an hour before the EF3 tornado at 2059 UTC. The tornado lifted just before entering Indian River County.						
EF2	W of Loxahatchee Groves to western Palm City to southern Fort Pierce	Palm Beach, Martin, St. Lucie	FL	26.6907°N 80.4445°W	20:33–21:50	64.59 mi (103.95 km)	300 yd (270 m)
EF2	A strong, long-track tornado began in rural Palm Beach County, moving over open, uninhabited land, including the J.W. Corbett Wildlife Management Area. The tornado then moved through rural Martin County, before impacting a few homes. A large, newly constructed home experienced major damage when nearly all of its roof was torn back and tossed onto an adjacent home. Nearby metal storage structures were also significantly damaged. The tornado continued northward, sporadically damaging vegetation and residential structures occurred. The tornado then damaged several industrial buildings, including the canopy of a gas station. Crossing Florida's Turnpike, it entered several subdivisions but only produced minor damage given that the homes were built strongly. Storm spotter video showed the tornado crossing the St. Lucie River becoming a well-defined waterspout before moving back ashore at the St. Lucia River Club, inflicting minor property damage and significant damage to vegetation. Sporadic property damage continued in eastern Port St. Lucie, mainly in the form of shingle loss and soffit damage. The tornado then entered Savannas Preserve State Park, causing more damage to vegetation before striking Indian River Estates where numerous homes were affected. Several parked vehicles were flipped and tossed, and a few homes experienced partial roof loss. The tornado continued into southern Fort Pierce, but dissipated quickly upon entering residential areas.						
EF3	SW of Wellington to The Acreage SW of Hobe Sound	Palm Beach, Martin	FL	26.5555°N 80.3321°W	20:43–21:30	32.89 mi (52.93 km)	457 yd (418 m)
EF3	See section on this tornado – 7 people were injured						
EF3	N of Port St. Lucie to Lakewood Park to Vero Beach	St. Lucie, Indian River	FL	27.3742°N 80.4266°W	20:59–21:30	21.24 mi (34.18 km)	500 yd (460 m)
EF3	6 deaths – See the section on this tornado						
EF2	Eastern Port Salerno	Martin	FL	27.0803°N 80.1932°W	17:35–17:46	5.71 mi (9.19 km)	400 yd (370 m)
EF2	A tornado began in the Atlantic Ridge Preserve State Park and tracked over marshland before impacting the Lost Lake subdivision, causing significant tile loss on concrete block homes and extensive vegetative damage. It continued into the Mariner Sands community, causing several wood-framed homes to lose roofs and partially collapsing their walls at low-end EF2 strength. One resident sustained minor injuries. The tornado then impacted the Manatee Creek subdivision, where about 30 wood-framed homes suffered major damage, including roof loss and wall collapse. The tornado then moved into Rocky Point, where the eastern side of the neighborhood experienced sporadic damage to roofs, soffits and downed trees and power lines. The tornado then moved out over onto the Intracoastal Waterway before dissipating as a waterspout.						
EF1	Cocoa Beach to Merritt Island	Brevard	FL	28.3395°N 80.6059°W	21:53–22:09	5.24 mi (8.43 km)	250 yd (230 m)
EF1	This waterspout moved onshore into Cocoa Beach near a condominium, damaging the roofs of several storage units and garages on the property. The tornado continued west-northwest, removing a large portion of the roof of a bank. Moving into residential area, the tornado caused roof loss, broken windows, and downed trees within the area. The tornado then moved offshore onto the Banana River before landfalling onto Merritt Island in the Riviera Isles subdivision, inflicting minor damage to pool and porch enclosures before dissipating quickly.						

=== October 13 event ===
List of confirmed tornadoes – Sunday, October 13, 2024
EF#	Location	County / Parish	State	Start Coord.	Time (UTC)	Path length	Max width
EFU	NW of Beechwood	Ottawa	MI	42.86°N 86.21°W	20:30–20:31	0.1 mi (0.16 km)	50 yd (46 m)
EFU	A waterspout moved ashore from Lake Michigan, tossing several beach chairs before quickly dissipating upon approaching a dune bluff.						

=== October 18 event ===
List of confirmed tornadoes – Friday, October 18, 2024
EF#	Location	County / Parish	State	Start Coord.	Time (UTC)	Path length	Max width
EF0	W of Tuba City	Coconino	AZ	36.0936°N 111.2928°W	23:15–23:17	9.13 mi (14.69 km)	10 yd (9.1 m)
EF0	A weak but relatively long-tracked landspout was recorded over open land.						

=== October 28 event ===
List of confirmed tornadoes – Tuesday, October 28, 2024
EF#	Location	County / Parish	State	Start Coord.	Time (UTC)	Path length	Max width
EF0	SW of Longview	Cowlitz	WA	46.1258°N 122.9929°W	21:30–21:32	0.2 mi (0.32 km)	20 yd (18 m)
EF0	A waterspout was photographed on the Columbia River.						

=== October 30 event ===
List of confirmed tornadoes – Thursday, October 30, 2024
EF#	Location	County / Parish	State	Start Coord.	Time (UTC)	Path length	Max width
EF1	SE of Afton	Ottawa	OK	36.675°N 94.933°W	03:25–03:29	2.1 mi (3.4 km)	350 yd (320 m)
EF1	Numerous trees were uprooted and large tree limbs were snapped.						
EF1	SSW of Fairland to SW of Wyandotte	Ottawa	OK	36.703°N 94.882°W	03:30–03:39	7.8 mi (12.6 km)	750 yd (690 m)
EF1	This tornado snapped large tree limbs, damaged several homes, destroyed multiple outbuildings, uprooted trees, and snapped power poles.						
EF0	N of Granville to SSE of Shelbina	Monroe	MO	39.5847°N 92.0893°W	03:50–03:56	6.02 mi (9.69 km)	150 yd (140 m)
EF0	A high-end EF0 tornado destroyed an outbuilding at a farm. Sporadic tree damage occurred as well.						
EF0	Southern Quincy	Adams	IL	39.895°N 91.3754°W	04:30–04:31	0.35 mi (0.56 km)	100 yd (91 m)
EF0	This brief, high-end EF0 tornado uprooted and snapped several trees and caused minor structural damage.						

=== October 31 event ===
List of confirmed tornadoes – Friday, October 31, 2024
EF#	Location	County / Parish	State	Start Coord.	Time (UTC)	Path length	Max width
EF1	Prairie Grove	Washington	AR	35.966°N 94.332°W	05:25–05:31	3 mi (4.8 km)	200 yd (180 m)
EF1	A tornado developed just southwest of Prairie Grove and quickly moved through the town. Numerous homes were damaged in town, some with significant roof damage. Trees were uprooted, outbuildings were damaged, numerous large tree limbs were snapped and power poles were blown down.						
EF0	Newport	Lincoln	OR	44.6239°N 124.0463°W	14:56–14:57	0.16 mi (0.26 km)	20 yd (18 m)
EF0	A few concrete shingles were torn off a building before it moved over the bay and various items weighing up to 1,100 lb (500 kg) were flipped or tossed in the parking lot. Security footage showed a non-condensed circulation moving over a parking before moving over Yaquina Bay and impacting pilings and a dock in the water.						

== See also ==
- Tornadoes of 2024
- List of United States tornadoes from June to July 2024
- List of United States tornadoes from November to December 2024
