= Heflin =

Heflin may refer to:

== Places in the United States ==
- Heflin, Alabama
- Heflin, Kentucky
- Heflin, Louisiana
- Heflin, Virginia

== Other uses ==
- Heflin (surname)
