= Heflin (surname) =

Heflin is a surname. Notable people with the surname include:

- Clarence Heflin (1921–2007), American politician from Missouri
- Donald Heflin (born 1958), American diplomat and ambassador
- Frances Heflin (1920–1994), American actress
- Howell Heflin (1921–2005), American politician from Alabama
- Jack Heflin (born 1998), American football player
- James Thomas Heflin (1869–1951), American politician from Alabama
- Milt Heflin (born 1943), NASA's first Chief Flight Director
- Van Heflin (1910–1971), American actor
- Victor Heflin (born 1960), American football player
