= Greene Township, Jay County, Indiana =

Greene Township
- Township
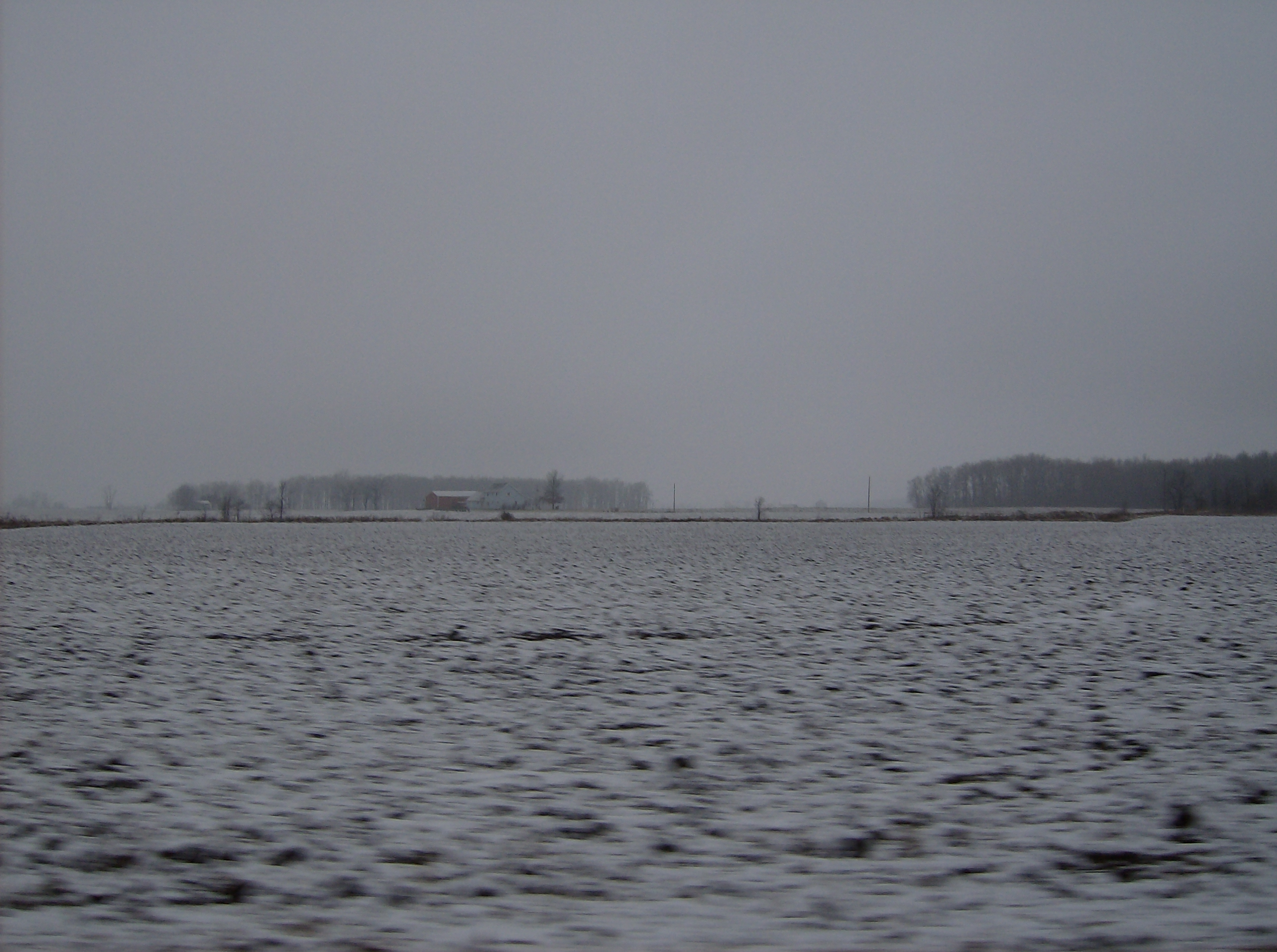
- Snow-covered fields and woods in western Greene Township

- Location in Jay County
- Coordinates: 40°25′59″N 85°04′11″W
- Country: United States
- State: Indiana
- County: Jay

Government
  - Type: Indiana township

Area
  - Total: 35.26 sq mi (91.3 km^{2})
  - Land: 35.25 sq mi (91.3 km^{2})
  - Water: 0.01 sq mi (0.026 km^{2}) 0.03%
- Elevation: 902 ft (275 m)

Population (2020)
  - Total: 926
  - Density: 26.3/sq mi (10.1/km^{2})
- GNIS feature ID: 0453348

Greene Township is one of twelve townships in Jay County, Indiana, United States. As of the 2020 census, its population was 926 (down from 989 at 2010) and it contained 383 housing units.

== History ==
Greene Township was organized in 1838. A large share of the early settlers being natives of Greene County, Ohio, caused the name to be selected.

== Geography ==
According to the 2010 census, the township has a total area of 35.26 square miles (91.3 km^{2}), of which 35.25 square miles (91.3 km^{2}) (or 99.97%) is land and 0.01 square miles (0.026 km^{2}) (or 0.03%) is water.

=== Unincorporated towns ===
- Blaine
- Greene

=== Extinct towns ===
- Corkwell
- Pony

=== Adjacent townships ===
- Jackson Township (north)
- Wayne Township (east)
- Pike Township (southeast)
- Jefferson Township (south)
- Richland Township (southwest)
- Knox Township (west)
- Penn Township (northwest)

=== Cemeteries ===
The township contains seven cemeteries: Center, Claycomb, Kinsey, Sager, Whaley, Whicker and Whiteman.

=== Major highways ===
- SR 26
- SR 67
