= Greene, Indiana =

- Unincorporated community
- Location within Indiana Location within the United States
- Coordinates: 40°24′30″N 85°06′00″W
- Country: United States
- State: Indiana
- County: Jay
- Township: Greene
- Elevation: 919 ft (280 m)
- FIPS code: 18-29455
- GNIS feature ID: 435433

Greene is an unincorporated community in Greene Township, Jay County, Indiana.

== History ==
A post office was established at Greene in 1862, and remained in operation until it was discontinued in 1900. The community was named from Greene Township.
