= Milt Heflin =

NASA's first Chief Flight Director (born 1943)

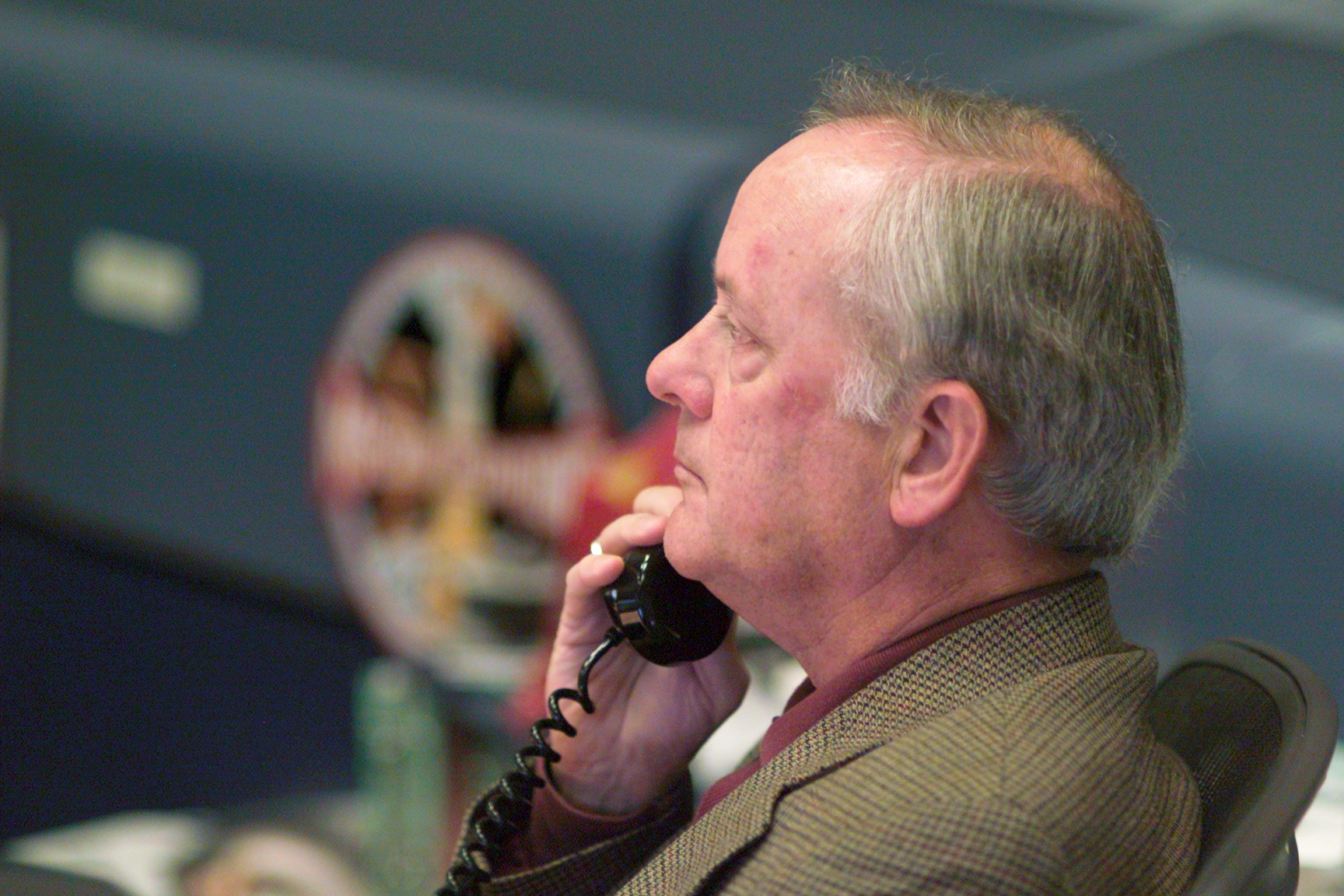
Heflin monitoring data in Houston Mission Control during the launch activities of Soyuz TMA-5 on October 14, 2004.

James Milton Heflin Jr. (born May 28, 1943 in Fairfax, Oklahoma) is a retired NASA official, who recently served as the associate director for technical activities at Johnson Space Center in Houston. Heflin also served as lead flight director for seven high-profile Space Shuttle missions, including the first to service and repair the Hubble Space Telescope and three that deployed inter-planetary probes.

== Personal ==
Heflin calls both Fairfax, Oklahoma and Edmond, Oklahoma home. He was born in Fairfax, and he moved with his family in 1956 to Edmond, where he lived from his eighth-grade year through college. He has been married to the former Sally Byler, a retired school teacher, since 1966. They have two sons – Daren and Matthew – and two granddaughters. He enjoys golf; vintage and amateur radio operating and collecting; and the Houston Texans NFL team. Heflin also plays trombone in an 18-piece big band that performs in the Houston area.

== Education ==
In 1966, Heflin graduated from Central State College (now known as University of Central Oklahoma) with a bachelor of science degree in physics and math.

== NASA career ==
Heflin began working at Houston's Manned Spacecraft Center (now Johnson Space Center) on June 6, 1966. His initial role was as a ground test vehicle engineer and test conductor for the development and qualification of water recovery hardware and procedures for the Apollo command module. He was also a director for the command module's reaction control subsystem deactivation and pyrotechnic safing team.

He was on the prime recovery ships during the splashdowns and post-landing activities of Apollo 8, Apollo 10, Apollo 16, Apollo 17, each of the three Skylab missions, and the Apollo-Soyuz Test Project. Heflin then worked as a flight controller for orbiter electrical and environmental systems for the Space Shuttle Approach and Landing Tests as well as the Shuttle's first nine missions.

Heflin progressed up the chain of command to work as a flight director, beginning with the April 1985 flight of STS-51D. He went on to oversee 20 Space Shuttle flights, with seven as lead flight director in charge of overall operations on the ground. Heflin was lead flight director for:

- STS-30 (May 1989), which deployed the Magellan planetary probe to Venus
- STS-34 (October 1989), which deployed the Galileo probe to Jupiter
- STS-41 (October 1990), which deployed the Ulysses probe to the sun
- STS-44 (November–December 1991), a Department of Defense mission that also deployed the unclassified Defense Support Program Satellite
- STS-47 (September 1992), which carried the Spacelab payload
- STS-61 (December 1993), the first Hubble Space Telescope repair and servicing mission
- STS-65 (July 1994), the second flight of the International Microgravity Laboratory

When the Space Shuttle Columbia broke up on February 1, 2003, Heflin was serving as chief of the flight director office. That same day, he took part in an emotional press conference in which he and Shuttle Program Manager Ron Dittemore outlined the details of the accident as they knew them at that point. That job was followed by a stint as deputy director of the Mission Operations Directorate, an organization of approximately 3,000 government and contractor employees responsible for the planning, training and flying of humans in space. In 2007, he became associate director (technical) at JSC.

At one time or another, Heflin has also been a charter member and deputy manager of the EVA (extravehicular activity) Project Office and served on the NASA Space Flight Safety Panel and as JSC's Ombudsman. He was also a member of the NASA Advisory Council Task Force on International Space Station Operational Readiness.

On March 1 of 2013, Milt Heflin retired from NASA.

== Team name ==
Each NASA flight director is allowed to choose a symbol or color to represent his or her team. Heflin chose to call his team Sirius. It is the brightest star in the heavens, and is sometimes referred to as the "dog" star.

== Recognitions ==
Largely as a result of the successful Hubble servicing mission, Heflin was named Countdown magazine's 1993 Astronaut of the Year, despite the fact that he had never flown in space. The repair team as a whole received the nation's highest aviation award, the Robert J. Collier Trophy for "outstanding leadership, integrity and the renewal of public faith in America's space program." In 1997, Heflin was inducted into the Aviation Week & Space Technology Hall of Fame, and the following year, was named to the Oklahoma Aviation and Space Hall of Fame in Oklahoma City.

Heflin is one of the few people whose career spanned the entirety of NASA's Apollo and Space Shuttle programs. Additionally, he is the only person who was present at the final landings of both the Apollo program in 1975 and of the Space Shuttle era in 2011.

== Special honors and awards ==
University of Central Oklahoma

- Distinguished Former Student – 1984
- Broncho Award - 1990 (One of 30 former students recognized from university's first 100 years)

Professional

- Johnson Space Center Certificate of Commendation – 1990
- NASA Exceptional Service Medal - 1991 and 2006
- NASA Outstanding Leadership Medal – 1993
- Presidential Rank Award of Meritorious Senior Executive – 2008
- "Aviation Week & Space Technology" Aerospace Laurel – 1989
- "Aviation Week & Space Technology" Aerospace Laureate – 1993
- "Aviation Week & Space Technology" Laureates Hall of Fame Inductee - 1997
