= Glendie, Virginia =

Unincorporated community in Virginia, US

Coordinates: 38°23′59″N 77°32′06″W

Glendie is an unincorporated community in Stafford County, in the U.S. state of Virginia.
