= Blaine, Indiana =

- Unincorporated community
- Location within Indiana Location within the United States
- Coordinates: 40°24′09″N 85°03′22″W
- Country: United States
- State: Indiana
- County: Jay
- Township: Greene
- Elevation: 925 ft (282 m)
- ZIP code: 47371
- FIPS code: 18-05626
- GNIS feature ID: 431159

Blaine is an unincorporated community in Greene Township, Jay County, Indiana.

== History ==
A post office was established at Blaine in 1882, and remained in operation until it was discontinued in 1914. Blaine was officially platted in 1883. The community was named in honor of James G. Blaine, who ran in the 1884 United States presidential election.
