= Clarence Heflin =

American politician

Member of the U.S. House of Representatives from Missouri's 39th district

Missouri House of Representatives
- In office 1967–1979

Personal details
- Born: 1921 Independence, Missouri, US
- Died: 2007 (aged 85–86) Mount Sterling, Missouri, US
- Party: Democratic
- Spouse(s): Betty Evelyn Beanland, Faye Sneed
- Children: 4 (3 son, 1 daughter)
- Occupation: grocery store owner, pilot

Clarence H. Heflin (April 25, 1921 - December 12, 2007) was an American Democratic politician who served in the Missouri House of Representatives. He was born in Independence, Missouri and was educated in William Chrisman High School in Independence and Washburn University in Topeka, Kansas. Heflin later served as an Air Force bomber pilot. On February 23, 1947, he married Betty Evelyn Beanland in Harrison, Arkansas. He later married Faye Sneed Heflin around 1987.
