= Heflin, Virginia =

Unincorporated community in Virginia, US

Coordinates: 38°29′18″N 77°34′41″W

Heflin is an unincorporated community in Stafford County, in the U.S. state of Virginia.
