= National Register of Historic Places listings in Jay County, Indiana =

Location of Jay County in Indiana

This is a list of the National Register of Historic Places listings in Jay County, Indiana.

This is intended to be a complete list of the properties and districts on the National Register of Historic Places in Jay County, Indiana, United States. Latitude and longitude coordinates are provided for many National Register properties and districts; these locations may be seen together in a map.

There are eight properties and districts listed on the National Register in the county.

Properties and districts located in incorporated areas display the name of the municipality, while properties and districts in unincorporated areas display the name of their civil township. Properties and districts split between multiple jurisdictions display the names of all jurisdictions.

This National Park Service list is complete through NPS recent listings posted August 29, 2025.

== Current listings ==
	Name on the Register	Image	Date listed	Location	City or town	Description
1	Floral Hall	Floral Hall	September 1, 1983 (#83000038)	E. Votaw and Morton Sts. at the Jay County Fairgrounds, east of Portland; 40°26′29″N 84°58′04″W	Wayne Township	
2	Grouping of Religious Buildings at Trinity	Grouping of Religious Buildings at Trinity	October 23, 1980 (#80000040)	Northeast of Portland at Trinity; 40°32′29″N 84°50′28″W	Wabash Township	
3	James Haines Farm	James Haines Farm	March 15, 2000 (#00000202)	County Road 869E 200S, southeast of Portland; 40°23′39″N 84°57′25″W	Pike Township	
4	Jay County Courthouse	Jay County Courthouse	May 12, 1981 (#81000016)	U.S. Route 27; 40°26′01″N 84°58′43″W	Portland	
5	Portland Commercial Historic District	Portland Commercial Historic District	May 30, 1996 (#96000600)	Roughly Meridian St. from Arch St. to the S. Meridian St. Bridge, and Main and Walnut Sts. from Ship to Court Sts. 40°26′00″N 84°58′48″W	Portland	
6	Rebecca Rankin Round Barn	Rebecca Rankin Round Barn	April 2, 1993 (#93000189)	State Road 18, ¼ mile west of its junction with County Road 75E, and northwest of Poling; 40°33′16″N 85°06′40″W	Penn Township	
7	Redkey Historic District	Redkey Historic District	September 17, 1992 (#92001168)	Roughly High St. between Oak and Meridian Sts. 40°20′59″N 85°09′07″W	Redkey	
8	Jonas Votaw House	Jonas Votaw House	December 6, 2004 (#04001308)	1525 S. Meridian St. 40°24′47″N 84°58′34″W	Portland	

== See also ==
- List of National Historic Landmarks in Indiana
- National Register of Historic Places listings in Indiana
- Listings in neighboring counties: Adams, Blackford, Darke (OH), Delaware, Mercer (OH), Randolph, Wells
