= Jay City, Indiana =

- former hamlet
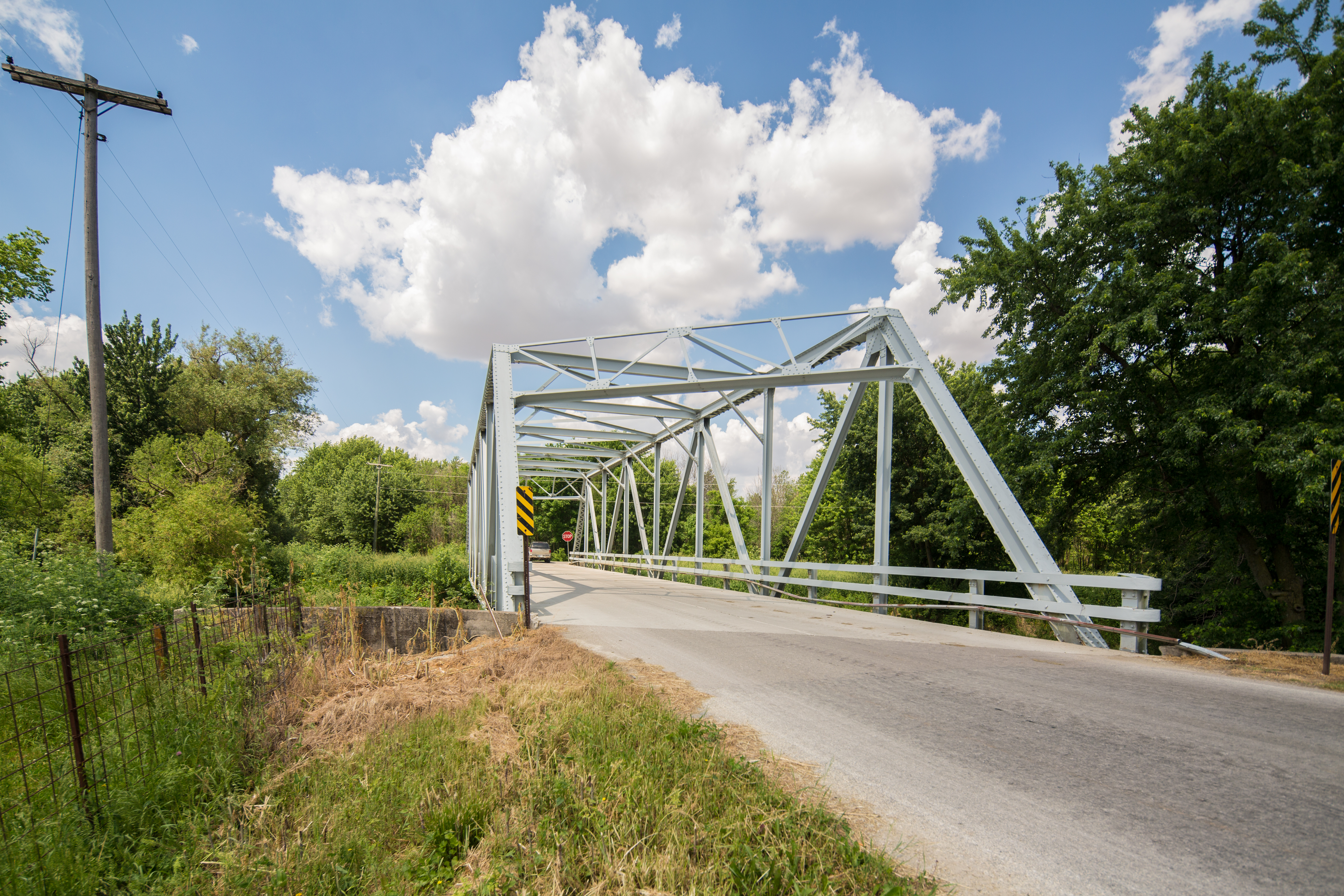

- Location within Indiana Location within the United States
- Coordinates: 40°34′02″N 84°50′55″W
- Country: United States
- State: Indiana
- County: Jay
- Township: Wabash
- Elevation: 846 ft (258 m)
- Time zone: UTC-5 (Eastern (EST))
  - Summer (DST): UTC-4 (EDT)
- GNIS feature ID: 436949

Jay City was once a hamlet in the south bank of the Wabash River across from New Corydon, Indiana, located in Wabash Township approximately 15.5 miles (24.9 km) north-east of Portland; but by 1922 had failed as a settlement and remained as only a name on maps.

It had been platted on 1840-06-07 by Samuel Hall and David Hite, and in 1887 was recorded as having a population of approximately 50. Also recorded were a blacksmiths, a wagon maker, a brick and tile factory 1 mile (1.6 km) to its south, and a general store founded by William L. Adams in 1874. It was served by the New Corydon post-office. It had had a saw mill since 1858 and a grist mill since 1859, both built by John Hall and Vynull Arnett, and later converted into a stave and shingle mill. Finally passing into the ownership of McCampbell & Burgess, the grist mill closed as did finally the saw mill sometime around 1882.

The Jay City chapel was a United Brethren church that was dedicated in 1872, the UB society having earlier organized in a school house located to the south of the hamlet on a cross-roads, with just 4 original members. In 1887 its congregation was recorded as 56 people, with a year-round Sunday school attended by 30. The building was a 32 by 46 feet (9.8 by 14.0 m) frame building.

The other nearby churches were the Fellowship Church, built on section 29 around 1863, with a congregation recorded in 1887 as between 35 and 40, and also with a year-round Sunday school attended by between 50 and 60 people; and the Walnut Grove Church of the United Brethren, built on section 31 around 1887 the churchpeople having previously organized their meetings since 1879 in a school house to the west, with a congregation of around 20 people. The Walnut Grove building was a 28 by 40 feet (8.5 by 12.2 m) frame building.

Jay City had also had a Masonic lodge that met on the 2nd story of Adams's general store, which was discontinued around 1871.
