= Barque =

Type of sailing vessel

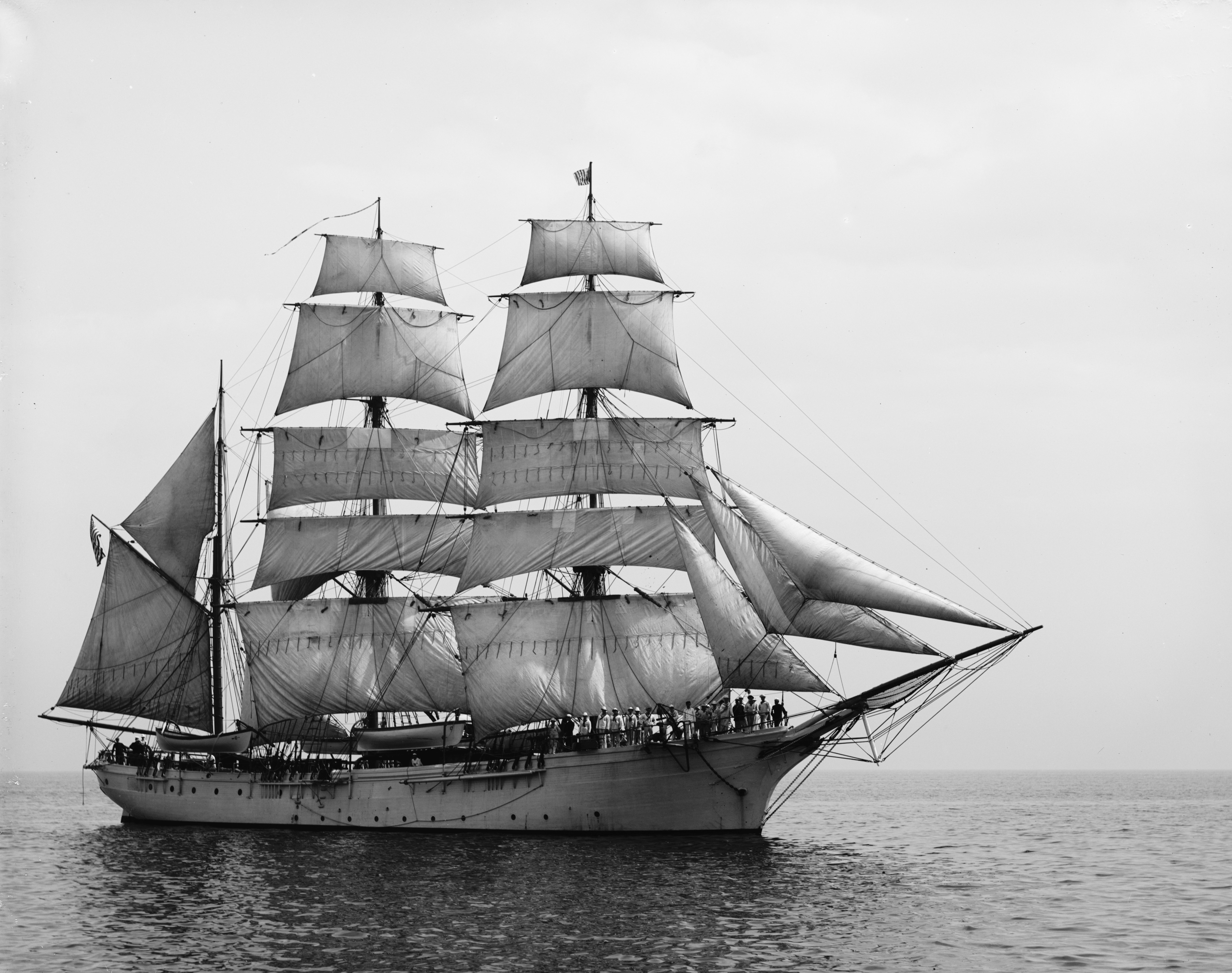
Three-masted barque (US Revenue Cutter Salmon P. Chase, 1878–1907)

Three-masted barque sail plan

A barque or bark is a type of sailing vessel with three or more masts of which the fore mast, mainmast, and any additional masts are rigged square, and only the aftmost mast (mizzen in three-masted barques) is rigged fore and aft. Sometimes, the mizzen is only partly fore-and-aft rigged, bearing a square-rigged sail above.

== Etymology ==
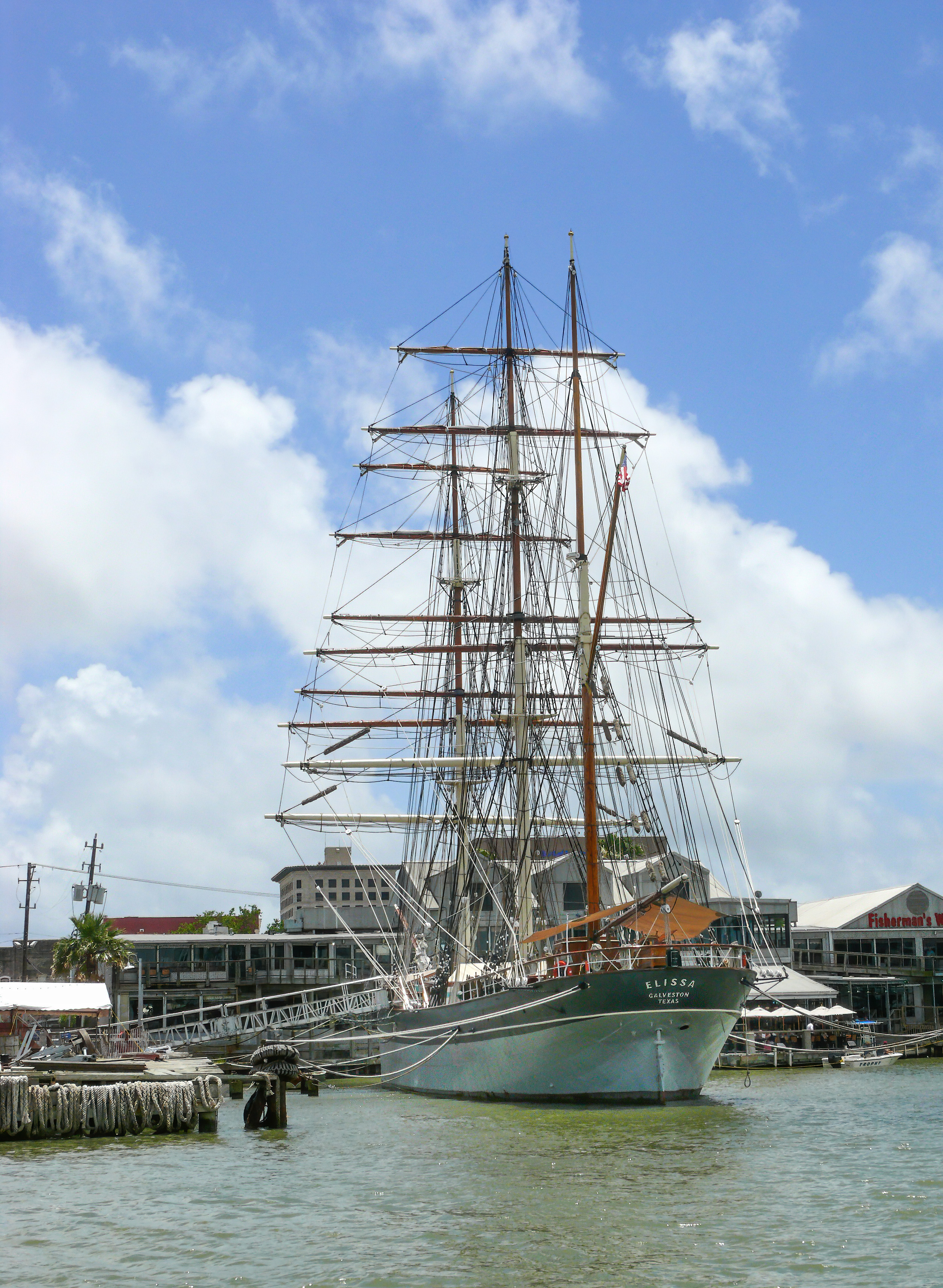
The tall ship Elissa is a three-masted barque in Galveston.

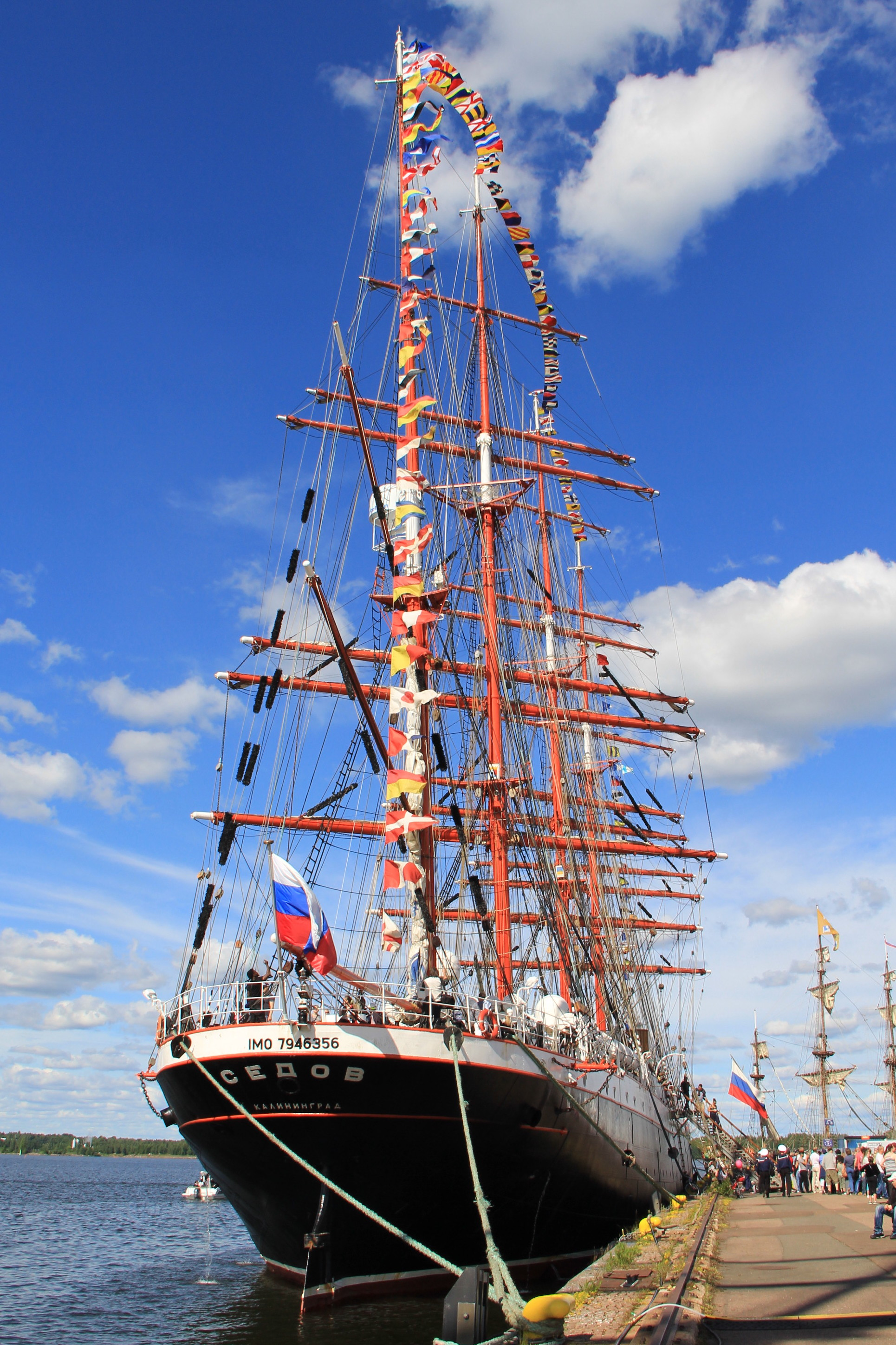
Russian Sedov at the Kantasatama Harbour in Kotka, Finland, during the Tall Ships’ Races 2017

The word "barque" entered English via the French term, which in turn came from the Latin barca by way of Occitan, Catalan, Spanish, or Italian.

The Latin barca may stem from Celtic barc (per Thurneysen) or Greek baris (per Diez), a term for an Egyptian boat. The Oxford English Dictionary, however, considers the latter improbable.

The word barc appears to have come from Celtic languages. The form adopted by English, perhaps from Irish, was "bark", while that adopted by Latin as barca very early, which gave rise to the French barge and barque.

In Latin, Spanish, and Italian, the term barca refers to a small boat, not a full-sized ship. French influence in England led to the use in English of both words, although their meanings now are not the same.

Well before the 19th century, a barge had become interpreted as a small vessel of coastal or inland waters, or a fast rowing boat carried by warships and normally reserved for the commanding officer. Somewhat later, a bark became a sailing vessel of a distinctive rig as detailed below. In Britain, by the mid-19th century, the spelling had taken on the French form of barque. Although Francis Bacon used the spelling with a "q" as early as 1592, Shakespeare still used the spelling "barke" in Sonnet 116 in 1609. Throughout the period of sail, the word was used also as a shortening of the barca-longa of the Mediterranean Sea.

The usual modern spelling convention is that, to distinguish between homophones, when spelled as barque it refers to a ship, and when spelled as bark it refers to either a sound or to a tree hide.

"Barcarole" in music shares the same etymology, being originally a folk song sung by Venetian gondoliers and derived from barca—"boat" in Italian, or in Late Latin.

== Bark ==
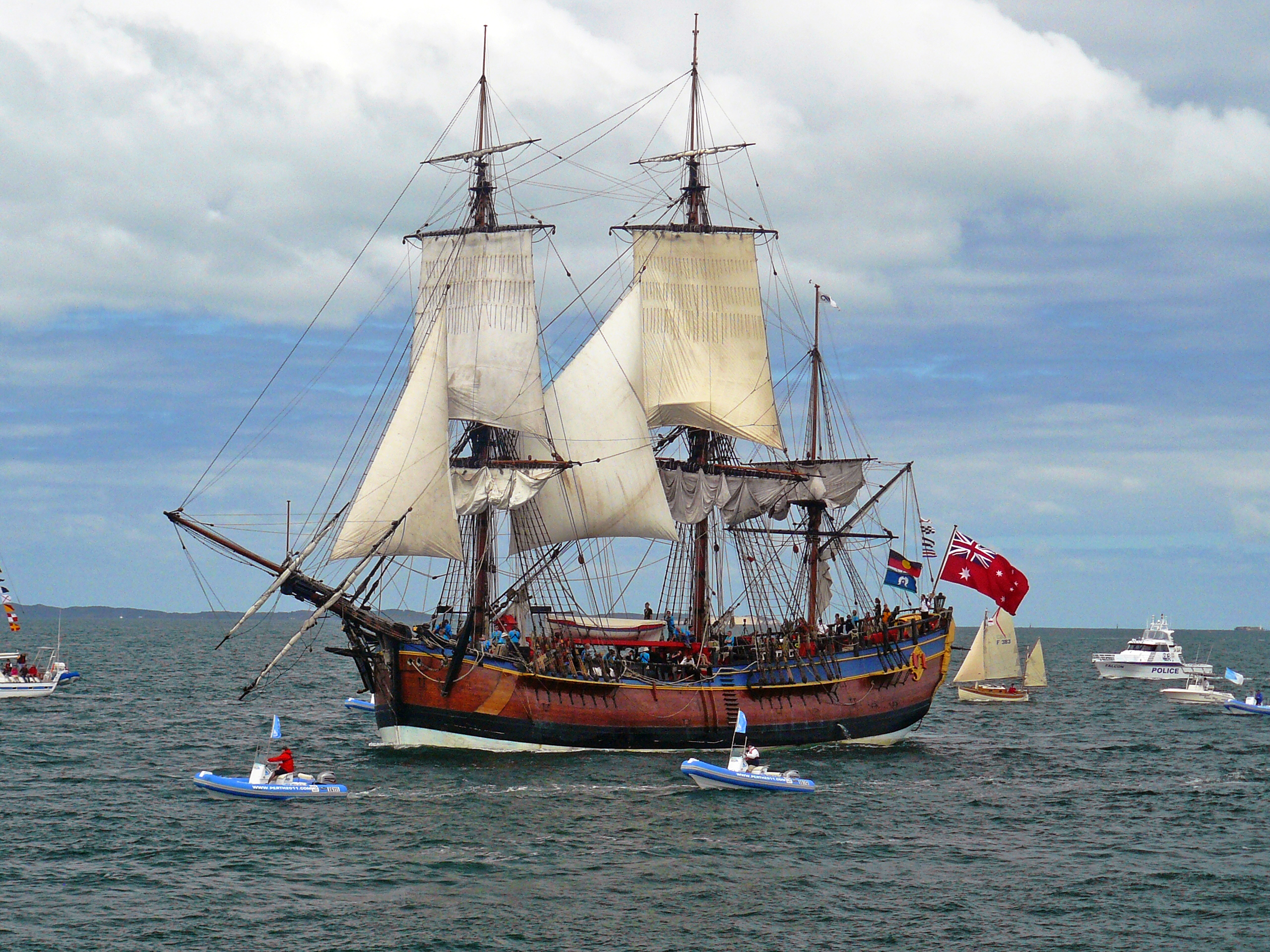
A 1993 replica of HM Bark Endeavour

In the 18th century, the Royal Navy used the term bark for a nondescript vessel that did not fit any of its usual categories. Thus, when the British admiralty purchased a collier for use by James Cook in his journey of exploration, she was registered as HM Bark Endeavour to distinguish her from another Endeavour, a sloop already in service at the time. Endeavour happened to be a full-rigged ship with a plain bluff bow and a full stern with windows.

William Falconer's Dictionary of the Marine defined "bark", as "a general name given to small ships: it is however peculiarly appropriated by seamen to those which carry three masts without a mizzen topsail. Our Northern Mariners, who are trained in the coal-trade, apply this distinction to a broad-sterned ship, which carries no ornamental figure on the stem or prow."

A 16th-century paper document in the Cheshire and Chester Archives and Local Studies Service notes the names of Robert Ratclyfe, owner of the bark Sunday and 10 mariners appointed to serve under the Earl of Sussex, Lord Deputy of Ireland.

== Barque rig ==
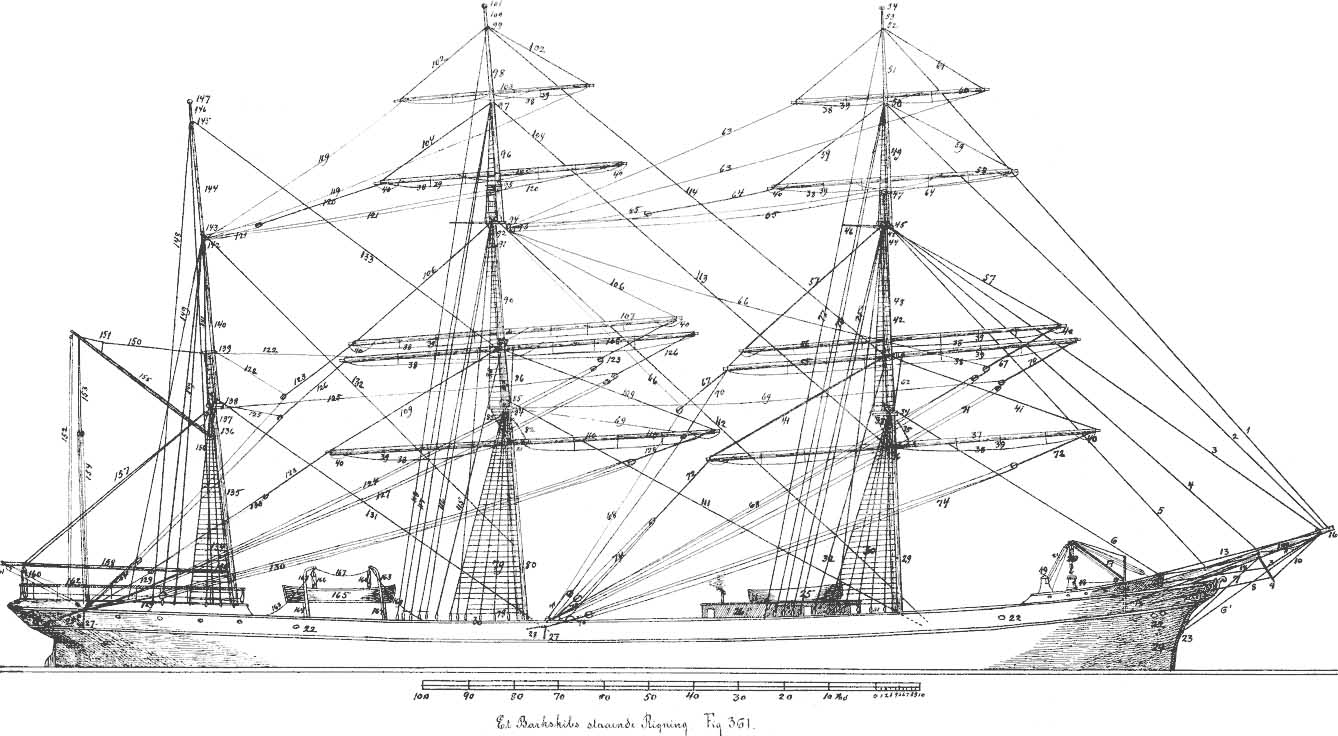
Rigging of a three-masted barque

By the end of the 18th century, the term barque (sometimes, particularly in the US, spelled bark) came to refer to any vessel with a particular type of sail plan. This comprises three (or more) masts, fore-and-aft sails on the aftermost mast and square sails on all other masts. Barques were the workhorse of the golden age of sail in the mid-19th century as they attained passages that nearly matched full-rigged ships, but could operate with smaller crews.

The advantage of these rigs was that they needed smaller (therefore cheaper) crews than a comparable full-rigged ship or brig-rigged vessel, as fewer of the labour-intensive square sails were used, and the rig itself is cheaper. Conversely, the ship rig tended to be retained for training vessels where the larger the crew, the more seamen were trained.

Another advantage is that, downwind, a barque can outperform a schooner or barkentine, and is both easier to handle and better at going to windward than a full-rigged ship. While a full-rigged ship is the best runner available, and while fore-and-aft rigged vessels are the best at going to windward, the barque and the barquentine, are compromises, which combine, in different proportions, the best elements of these two.

Whether square-rig, barque, barquentine or schooner is optimal depends on the degree to which the sailing-route and season can be chosen to achieve following-wind. Square-riggers predominated for intercontinental sailing on routes chosen for following-winds.

Most ocean-going windjammers were four-masted barques, due to the above-described considerations and compromises. Usually the main mast was the tallest; that of Moshulu extends to 58 m off the deck. The four-masted barque can be handled with a surprisingly small crew—at minimum, 10—and while the usual crew was around 30, almost half of them could be apprentices.

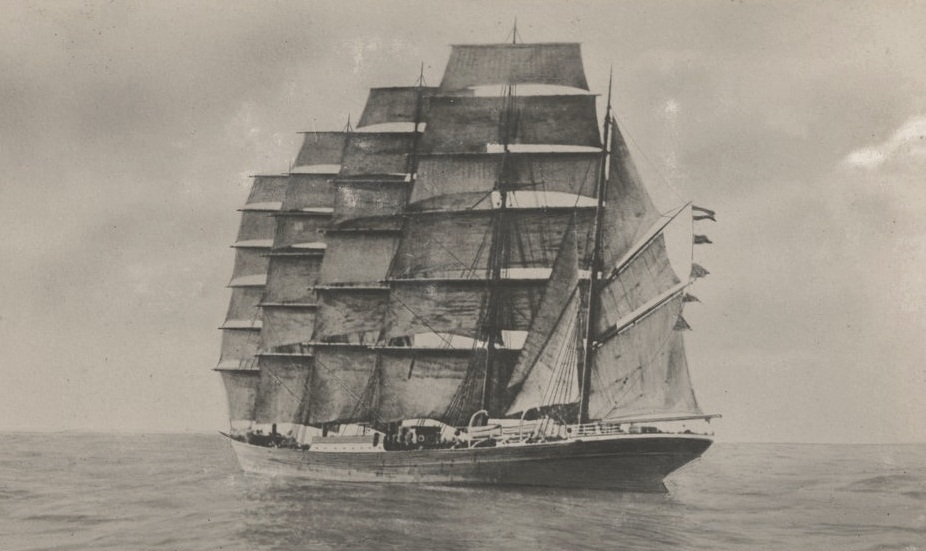
Five-masted barque Potosi (c. 1895–1920)

Today many sailing-school ships are barques.

A well-preserved example of a commercial barque is the Pommern, the only windjammer in original condition. Its home is in Mariehamn outside the Åland maritime museum. The wooden barque Sigyn, built in Gothenburg 1887, is now a museum ship in Turku. The wooden whaling barque Charles W. Morgan, launched 1841, taken out of service 1921, is now a museum ship at Mystic Seaport in Connecticut. The Charles W. Morgan has recently been refit and is (as of summer, 2014) sailing the New England coast. The United States Coast Guard still has an operational barque, built in Germany in 1936 and captured as a war prize, the USCGC Eagle, which the United States Coast Guard Academy in New London uses as a training vessel. The Sydney Heritage Fleet restored an iron-hulled three-masted barque, the James Craig, originally constructed as Clan Macleod in 1874 and sailing at sea fortnightly. The oldest active sailing vessel in the world, the Star of India, was built in 1863 as a full-rigged ship, then converted into a barque in 1901.

This type of ship inspired the French composer Maurice Ravel to write his famous piece, Une Barque sur l'ocean, originally composed for piano, in 1905, then orchestrated in 1906.

Statsraad Lehmkuhl is in active operation in its barque form, stripped down without most of its winches and later improvements more aligned to the upbringing of future sailors both as a schoolship, training operations for the Norwegian Navy and generally available for interested volunteers. During the summer of 2021, it hosted "NRK Sommarskuta" with live TV everyday sailing all of the Norwegian coast from north to south and crossing the North Sea to Shetland. After this it will perform its first full sailing trip around world, estimated to take 19 months with many promotional events along the way. Scientific equipment has been installed in support of ongoing university studies to monitor and log environmental data.

== Barques and barque shrines in Ancient Egypt ==
In Ancient Egypt, barques, referred to using the French word as Egyptian hieroglyphs were first translated by the Frenchman Jean-François Champollion, were a type of boat used from Egypt's earliest recorded times and are depicted in many drawings, paintings, and reliefs that document the culture. Transportation to the afterlife was believed to be accomplished by way of barques, as well, and the image is used in many of the religious murals and carvings in temples and tombs.

The most important Egyptian barque carried the dead pharaoh to become a deity. Great care was taken to provide a beautiful barque to the pharaoh for this journey, and models of the boats were placed in their tombs. Many models of these boats, that range from tiny to huge in size, have been found. Wealthy and royal members of the culture also provided barques for their final journey. The type of vessel depicted in Egyptian images remains quite similar throughout the thousands of years the culture persisted.

Barques were important religious artifacts, and since the deities were thought to travel in this fashion in the sky, the Milky Way was seen as a great waterway that was as important as the Nile on Earth; cult statues of the deities traveled by boats on water and ritual boats were carried about by the priests during festival ceremonies. Temples included barque shrines, sometimes more than one in a temple, in which the sacred barques rested when a procession was not in progress. In these stations, the boats would be watched over and cared for by the priests.

== Barque of St. Peter ==
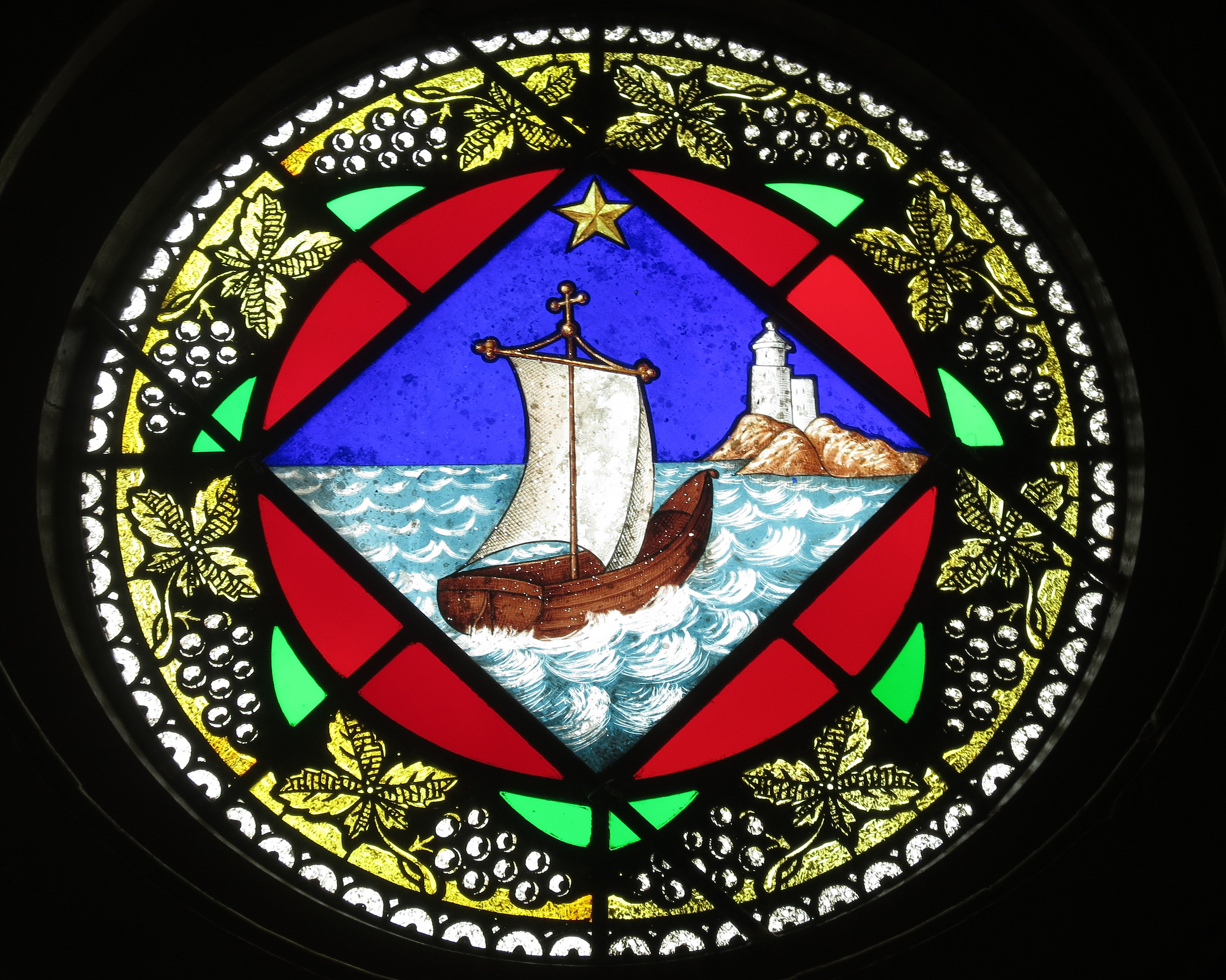
A stained glass window depicting the Barque of Saint Peter in Holy Trinity Catholic Church (Trinity, Indiana)

The Barque of St. Peter, or the Barque of Peter, is a reference to the Roman Catholic Church. The term refers to Peter, the first Pope, who was a fisherman before becoming an apostle of Jesus. The Pope is often said to be steering the Barque of St. Peter.

== See also ==
- Barquentine or barkentine (three masts, fore mast square-rigged)
- Brigantine (two masts, fore mast square-rigged)
- Jackass-barque (three masts, fore mast and upper part of mizzen mast square-rigged)
- Schooner
- Windjammer
- List of large sailing vessels
