= Pete Daily =

American jazz cornetist (1911–1986)

Pete Daily (May 5, 1911 – August 23, 1986) was an American dixieland jazz cornetist and valve trombonist.

== Career ==
Born Thaman Pierce Daily in Portland, Indiana, he started his career in 1930, playing with various bands in and around Chicago. In 1942, he moved to the West Coast and, after service in World War II, formed Pete Daily and his Chicagoans. The Chicagoans also recorded as Dixie by Daily, and Pete Daily's Dixieland Band, for the Capitol, Jump, and Decca labels.

Dixieland music enjoyed a renaissance in 1949 on records, radio, live shows, and motion pictures. Pete Daily was very much in demand, playing at the fashionable Sardi's nightclub in Hollywood. Daily left the engagement on March 1, 1950, to embark on a national tour; his spot at Sardi's was taken by Red Nichols. That year he had his only charting album, Daily's Dixieland Band, which reached No. 8 in the US. In 1951 Daily attracted enough notice to be signed for two feature films: the minstrel-show revue Yes Sir, Mr. Bones and the musical Rhythm Inn (in which Daily appeared with Wingy Manone, Matty Matlock, and other veterans in a jam session). That same year, Daily and his band appeared in Snader Telescriptions, three-minute musical films produced for television.

In 1954, during the filming of Pete Kelly's Blues, actor Jack Webb, the cornet-playing star of the film, repeatedly went to the nightclub where Daily performed to study his mannerisms for his role in the film. The band which recorded the soundtrack appeared at dixieland festivals, supported by Pete Daily's band.

Daily played long engagements at several Hollywood nightclubs in the 1950s including The Royal Room, The Hangover, Mike Lyman's, the Beverly Caverns, and the Astors in Studio City. He continued to play during the 1970s until a stroke in 1979 forced him to retire. His driving style on the cornet endeared him to generations of dixieland jazz enthusiasts.

== Family ==
He was married to the former Faye O'Brien (July 6, 1915 – February 3, 1973). In 1973, Pete married his second wife Florence, who died in 1974 as a result of burns received in a house fire. Over the years since his death, two women have claimed to have been married to him between 1974 and 1986, but have not produced marriage licenses or dates to support this.

He and Faye had six children: Patricia (December 9, 1936 - May 26, 2014); Kathleen (June 11, 1938 - 2008); Maureen; Dennis and Pete (both deceased); and Tim (October 27, 1947 - 2008).
