= Portland Commercial Historic District =

Historic district in Indiana, United States

- U.S. National Register of Historic Places
- U.S. Historic district
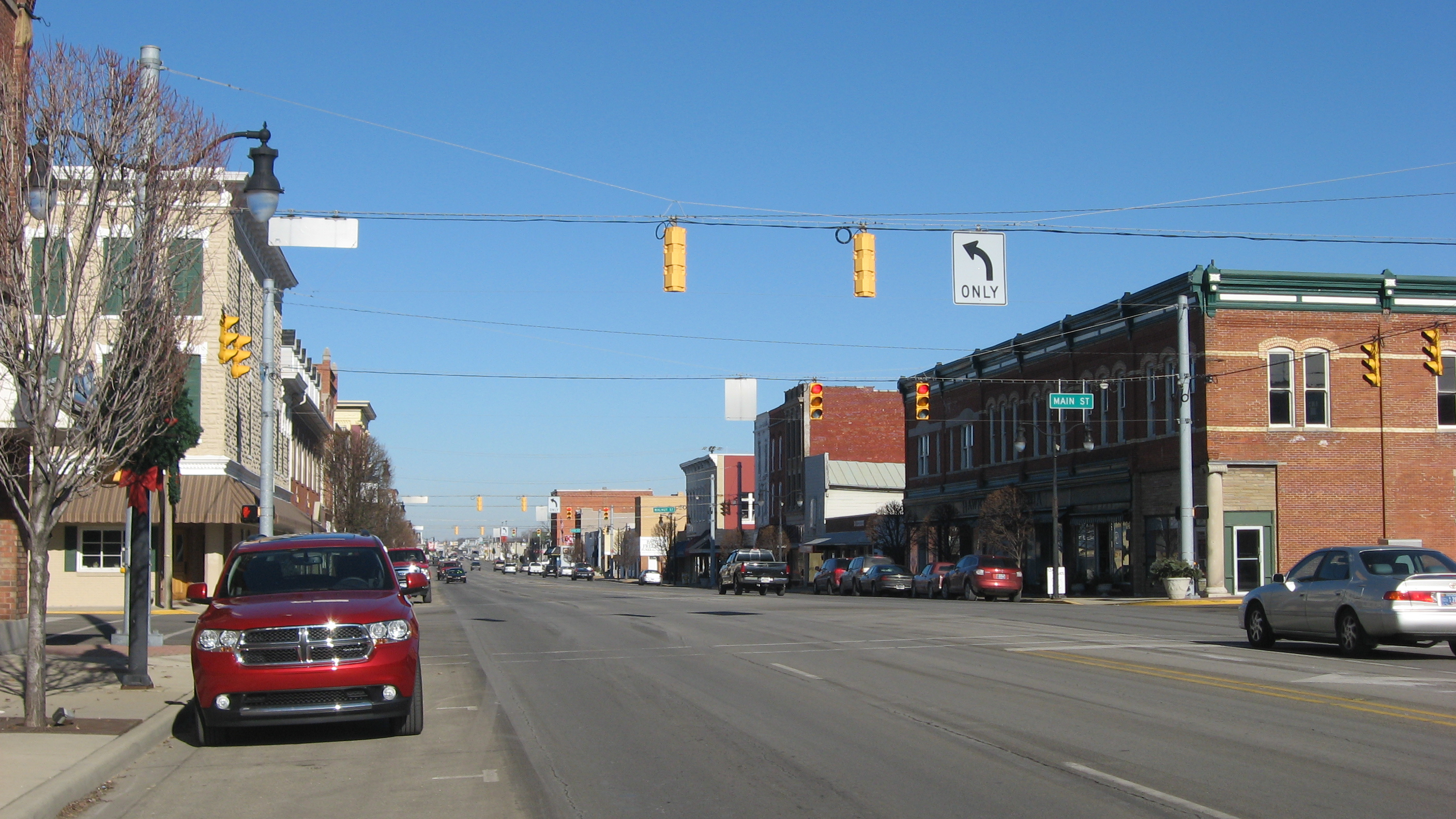
- Meridian and Main in Portland, January 2012

- Location within Indiana Location within the United States
- Location: Roughly, Meridian St. from Arch St. to the S. Meridian St. Bridge, and Main and Walnut Sts. from Ship to Court Sts., Portland, Indiana
- Coordinates: 40°26′00″N 84°58′49″W
- Area: 32 acres (13 ha)
- Architect: McLaughlin & Hulsken; Wenderoth, Oscar
- Architectural style: Italianate, Romanesque, Neoclassical, Early Commercial
- NRHP reference No.: 96000600
- Added to NRHP: May 30, 1996

Portland Commercial Historic District is a national historic district located at Portland, Indiana. It encompasses 58 contributing buildings, one contributing structure, and one contributing object in the central business district of Portland. The district developed between about 1870 and 1945, and includes notable examples of Italianate, Romanesque Revival, Classical Revival, and Early Commercial style architecture. Located in the district is the separately listed Jay County Courthouse. Other notable contributing resources include the U.S. Post Office (1914) designed by the Office of the Supervising Architect under Oscar Wenderoth, Portland Fire Station #1 (1929), Citizens Bank (c. 1875, 1912), FOE Eagles Lodge (1883), Johnson Building (c. 1900), Stevens Building (1910), Walnut Street Church of Christ (1913), and South Meridian Street Bridge (1914).

It was listed on the National Register of Historic Places in 1996.
