= Wabash Township, Jay County, Indiana =

Wabash Township
- Township
- Location in Jay County
- Coordinates: 40°31′57″N 84°50′35″W
- Country: United States
- State: Indiana
- County: Jay

Government
  - Type: Indiana township

Area
  - Total: 23.49 sq mi (60.8 km^{2})
  - Land: 23.46 sq mi (60.8 km^{2})
  - Water: 0.03 sq mi (0.078 km^{2}) 0.13%
- Elevation: 869 ft (265 m)

Population (2020)
  - Total: 542
  - Density: 23.1/sq mi (8.92/km^{2})
- GNIS feature ID: 0453965

Wabash Township is one of twelve townships in Jay County, Indiana, United States. As of the 2020 census, its population was 542 inhabitants (down from 578 inhabitants from 2010) and it contained 168 housing units.

== History ==
The Grouping of Religious Buildings at Trinity was listed on the National Register of Historic Places in 1980.

== Geography ==
According to the 2010 census, the township has a total area of 23.49 square miles (60.8 km^{2}), of which 23.46 square miles (60.8 km^{2}) (or 99.87%) is land and 0.03 square miles (0.078 km^{2}) (or 0.13%) is water. The streams of Franks Drain, Loblolly Creek and Wilson Creek run through this township.

=== Unincorporated towns ===
- Jay City
- New Corydon

=== Cemeteries ===
The township contains one cemetery, Stevenson.

=== Major highways ===
- SR 67
- SR 116

=== Airports and landing strips ===
- Stolz Field
