= Jay County Courthouse =

- U.S. National Register of Historic Places
- U.S. Historic district – Contributing property
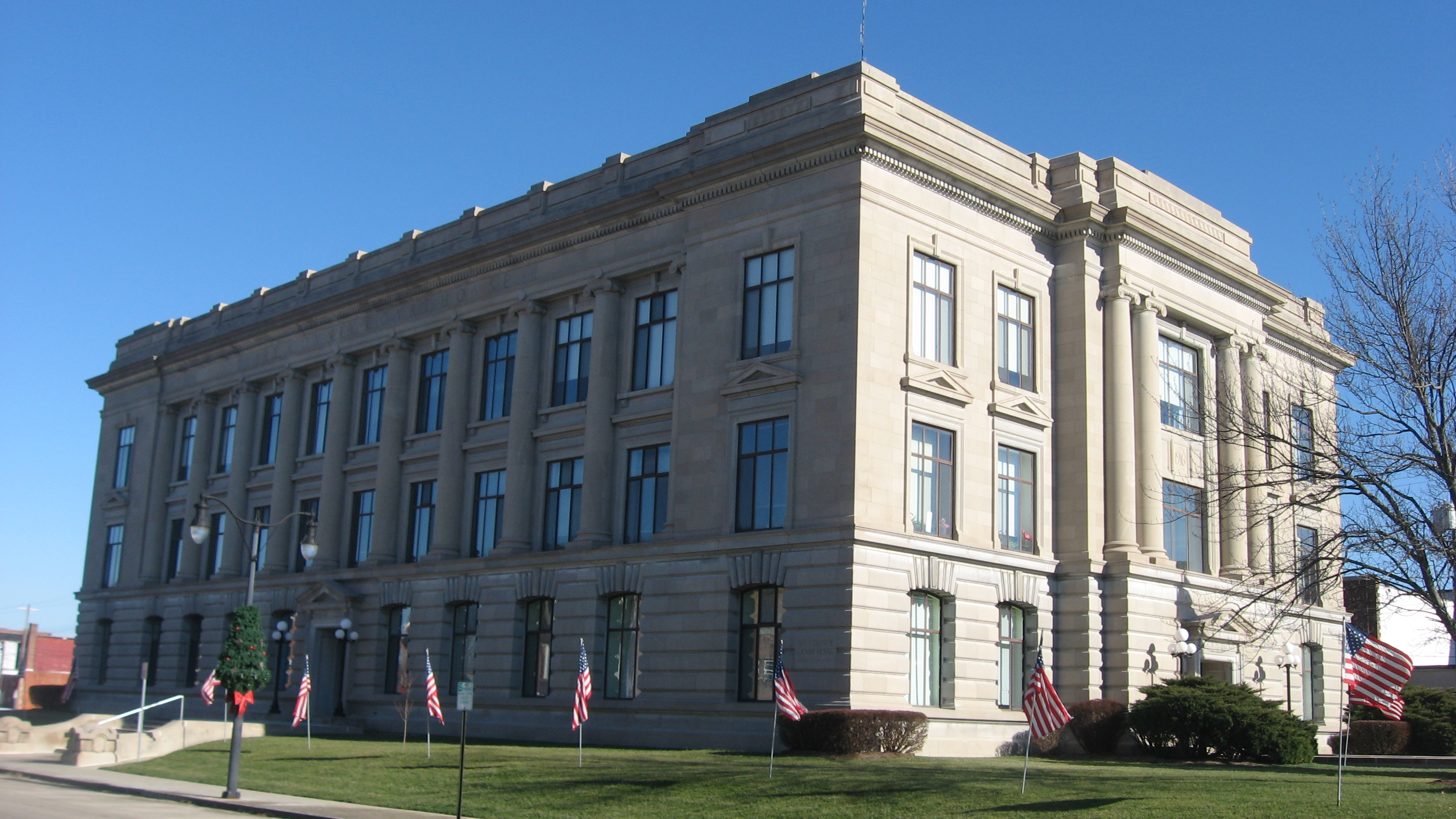
- Jay County Courthouse, January 2012

- Location within Indiana Location within the United States
- Interactive map showing the location for Jay County Courthouse
- Location: U.S. 27, Portland, Indiana
- Coordinates: 40°26′1″N 84°58′43″W
- Area: 1.5 acres (0.61 ha)
- Built: 1915
- Architect: Hulsken, Peter & McLaughlin, Thomas
- Architectural style: Late 19th And 20th Century Revivals, 2nd Renaissance Revival
- NRHP reference No.: 81000016
- Added to NRHP: May 12, 1981

Jay County Courthouse is a historic courthouse located at Portland, Indiana. It was built between 1915 and 1919, and is a three-story, Renaissance Revival style limestone building with a low roof behind a parapet. It is five bays by eleven bays with a rusticated exterior base and smooth upper floors and paired Ionic order engaged columns.

It was listed on the National Register of Historic Places in 1981. It is located in the Portland Commercial Historic District.
