= Redkey, Indiana =

- Town
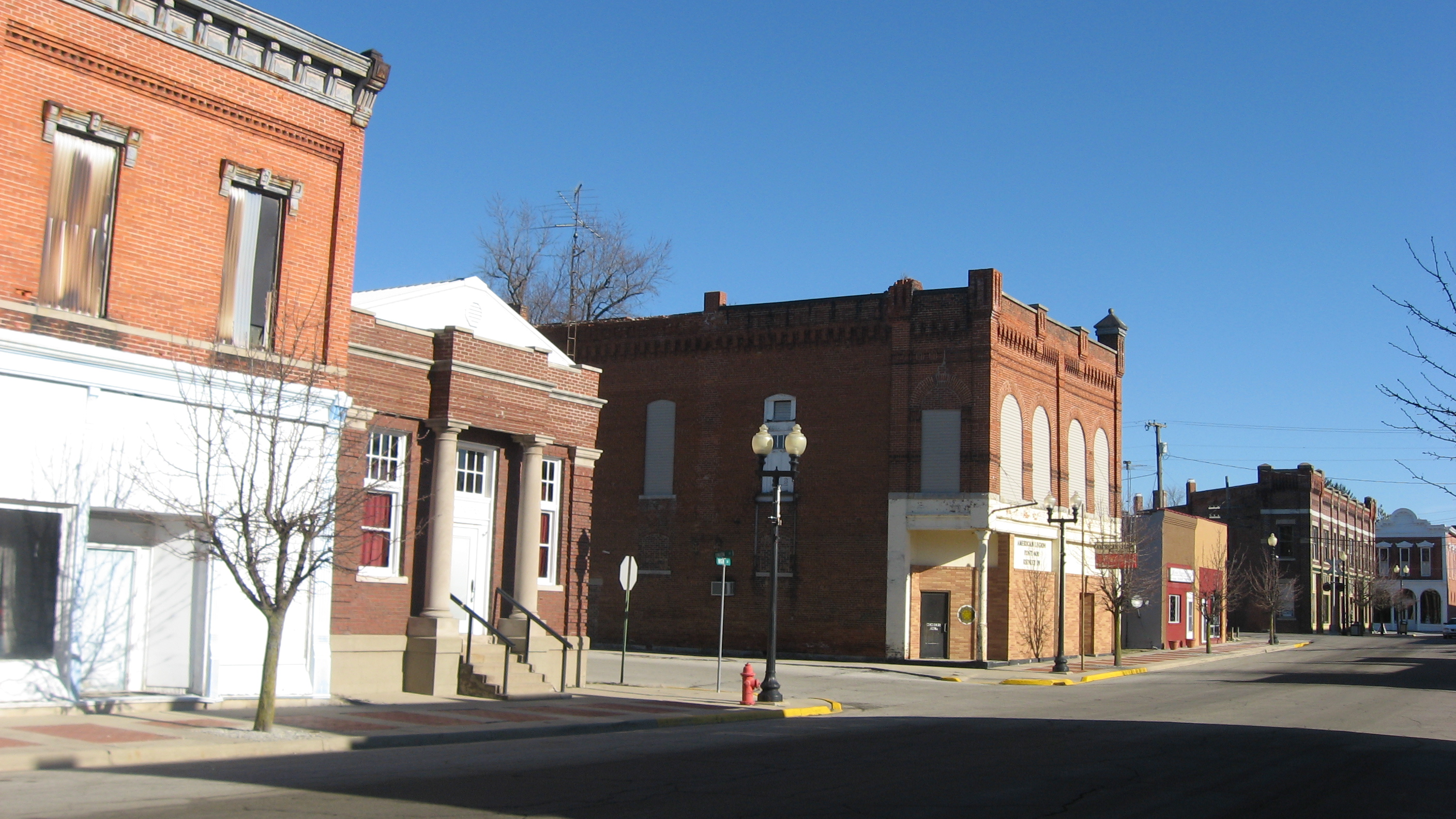
- High Street, downtown

- Location of Redkey in Jay County, Indiana.
- Coordinates: 40°20′54″N 85°09′14″W
- Country: United States
- State: Indiana
- County: Jay
- Township: Richland

Area
  - Total: 0.87 sq mi (2.26 km^{2})
  - Land: 0.87 sq mi (2.26 km^{2})
  - Water: 0 sq mi (0.00 km^{2})
- Elevation: 968 ft (295 m)

Population (2020)
  - Total: 1,100
  - Estimate (2025): 1,065 ▼
  - Density: 1,262/sq mi (487.4/km^{2})
- Time zone: UTC-5 (Eastern (EST))
  - Summer (DST): UTC-4 (EDT)
- ZIP code: 47373
- Area code: 765
- FIPS code: 18-63450
- GNIS feature ID: 2396871
- Website: www.in.gov/towns/redkey/

Redkey is a town in Richland Township, Jay County, Indiana, United States. The population was 1,100 at the 2020 census.

== History ==
Redkey was named for James Redkey, who platted an addition to the town when the railroad was built through it in 1867. The area was originally known as the Wade Settlement, after the family of Josiah Wade, who settled there in 1836. His son William Harrison Wade platted a village there in 1854, which he called Mt. Vernon. James Redkey platted his addition in 1856, but when application was made for a government post office, the name Mt. Vernon was already taken, so the name of Redkey was chosen. Redkey was incorporated in 1883.

The Redkey Historic District was listed on the National Register of Historic Places in 1992.

== Geography ==
According to the 2010 census, Redkey has a total area of 0.95 square miles (2.46 km^{2}), of which 0.94 square miles (2.43 km^{2}) (or 98.95%) is land and 0.01 square miles (0.03 km^{2}) (or 1.05%) is water.

== Demographics ==
Historical population
Census	Pop.	Note	%±
1880	386		—
1890	922		138.9%
1900	2,206		139.3%
1910	1,714		−22.3%
1920	1,386		−19.1%
1930	1,370		−1.2%
1940	1,538		12.3%
1950	1,639		6.6%
1960	1,746		6.5%
1970	1,667		−4.5%
1980	1,537		−7.8%
1990	1,383		−10.0%
2000	1,427		3.2%
2010	1,353		−5.2%
2020	1,100		−18.7%
2025 (est.)	1,065	▼	−3.2%
U.S. Decennial Census

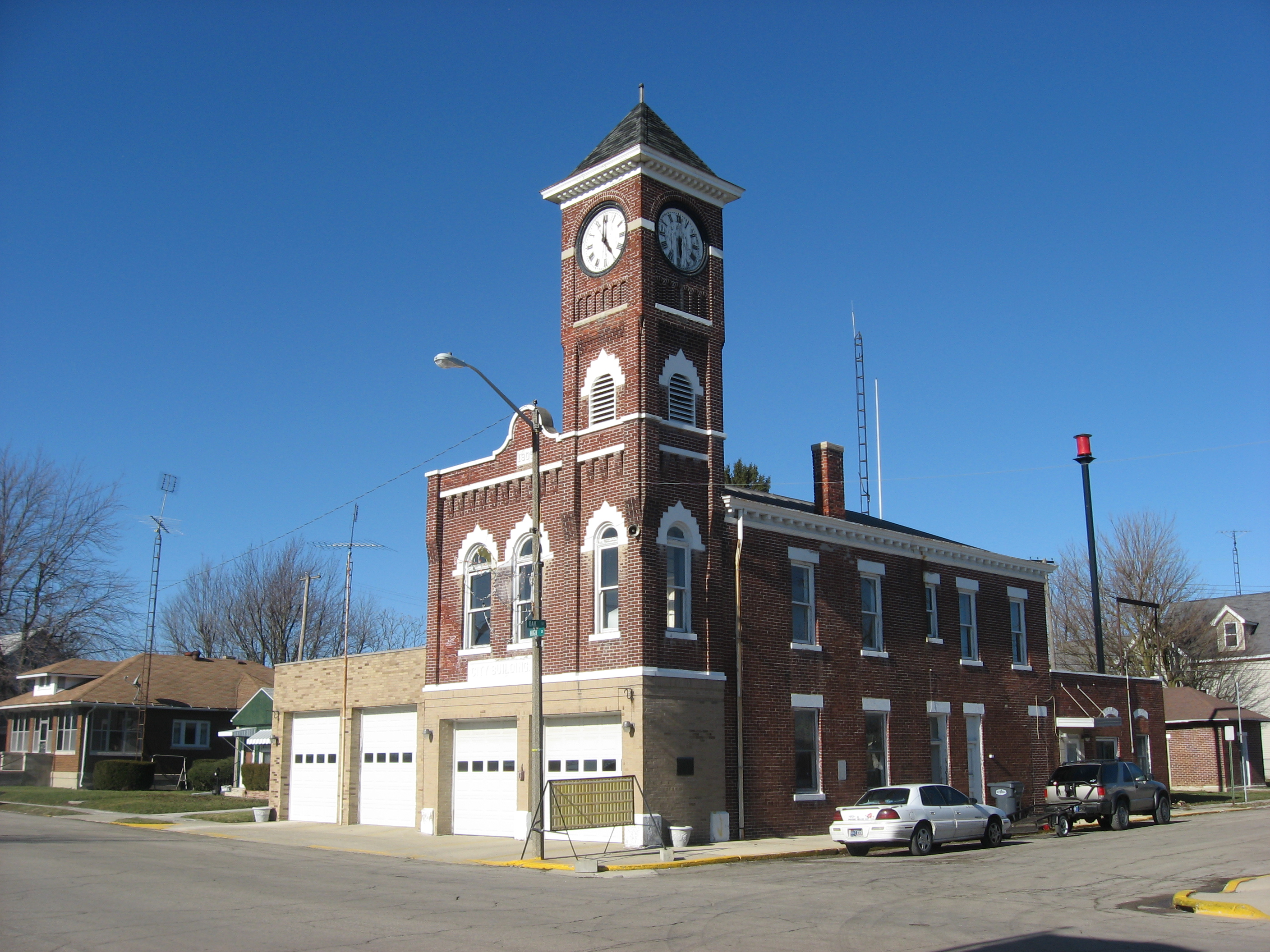
Municipal building

=== 2020 census ===
As of the 2020 census, Redkey had a population of 1,100. The median age was 43.9 years. 21.6% of residents were under the age of 18 and 20.1% of residents were 65 years of age or older. For every 100 females there were 91.6 males, and for every 100 females age 18 and over there were 87.4 males age 18 and over.

0.0% of residents lived in urban areas, while 100.0% lived in rural areas.

There were 476 households in Redkey, of which 28.2% had children under the age of 18 living in them. Of all households, 41.0% were married-couple households, 19.5% were households with a male householder and no spouse or partner present, and 29.4% were households with a female householder and no spouse or partner present. About 31.7% of all households were made up of individuals and 14.9% had someone living alone who was 65 years of age or older.

There were 547 housing units, of which 13.0% were vacant. The homeowner vacancy rate was 0.6% and the rental vacancy rate was 8.1%.

Racial composition as of the 2020 census
Race	Number	Percent
White	1,038	94.4%
Black or African American	5	0.5%
American Indian and Alaska Native	2	0.2%
Asian	8	0.7%
Native Hawaiian and Other Pacific Islander	0	0.0%
Some other race	8	0.7%
Two or more races	39	3.5%
Hispanic or Latino (of any race)	18	1.6%

=== 2010 census ===
As of the census of 2010, there were 1,353 people, 551 households, and 365 families living in the town. The population density was 1,439.4 inhabitants per square mile (555.8/km^{2}). There were 630 housing units at an average density of 670.2 per square mile (258.8/km^{2}). The racial makeup of the town was 98.2% White, 0.2% African American, 0.2% Asian, 0.5% from other races, and 0.9% from two or more races. Hispanic or Latino of any race were 1.4% of the population.

There were 551 households, of which 35.8% had children under the age of 18 living with them, 44.5% were married couples living together, 15.6% had a female householder with no husband present, 6.2% had a male householder with no wife present, and 33.8% were non-families. 27.9% of all households were made up of individuals, and 13.2% had someone living alone who was 65 years of age or older. The average household size was 2.46 and the average family size was 2.96.

The median age in the town was 37.1 years. 27.3% of residents were under the age of 18; 8.5% were between the ages of 18 and 24; 25.4% were from 25 to 44; 22.6% were from 45 to 64; and 16.1% were 65 years of age or older. The gender makeup of the town was 48.2% male and 51.8% female.

=== 2000 census ===
As of the census of 2000, there were 1,427 people, 586 households, and 400 families living in the town. The population density was 1,526.8 inhabitants per square mile (589.5/km^{2}). There were 637 housing units at an average density of 681.6 per square mile (263.2/km^{2}). The racial makeup of the town was 98.95% White, 0.14% African American, 0.07% Native American, 0.07% Asian, and 0.77% from two or more races. Hispanic or Latino of any race were 0.91% of the population.

There were 586 households, out of which 31.6% had children under the age of 18 living with them, 51.9% were married couples living together, 12.1% had a female householder with no husband present, and 31.6% were non-families. 27.5% of all households were made up of individuals, and 13.0% had someone living alone who was 65 years of age or older. The average household size was 2.44 and the average family size was 2.94.

In the town, the population was spread out, with 26.9% under the age of 18, 7.0% from 18 to 24, 27.4% from 25 to 44, 24.5% from 45 to 64, and 14.2% who were 65 years of age or older. The median age was 36 years. For every 100 females, there were 93.4 males. For every 100 females age 18 and over, there were 86.3 males.

The median income for a household in the town was $30,732, and the median income for a family was $36,042. Males had a median income of $29,464 versus $19,340 for females. The per capita income for the town was $13,906. About 11.2% of families and 14.0% of the population were below the poverty line, including 21.1% of those under age 18 and 11.6% of those age 65 or over.
