= Redkey Historic District =

Historic district in Indiana, United States

- U.S. National Register of Historic Places
- U.S. Historic district
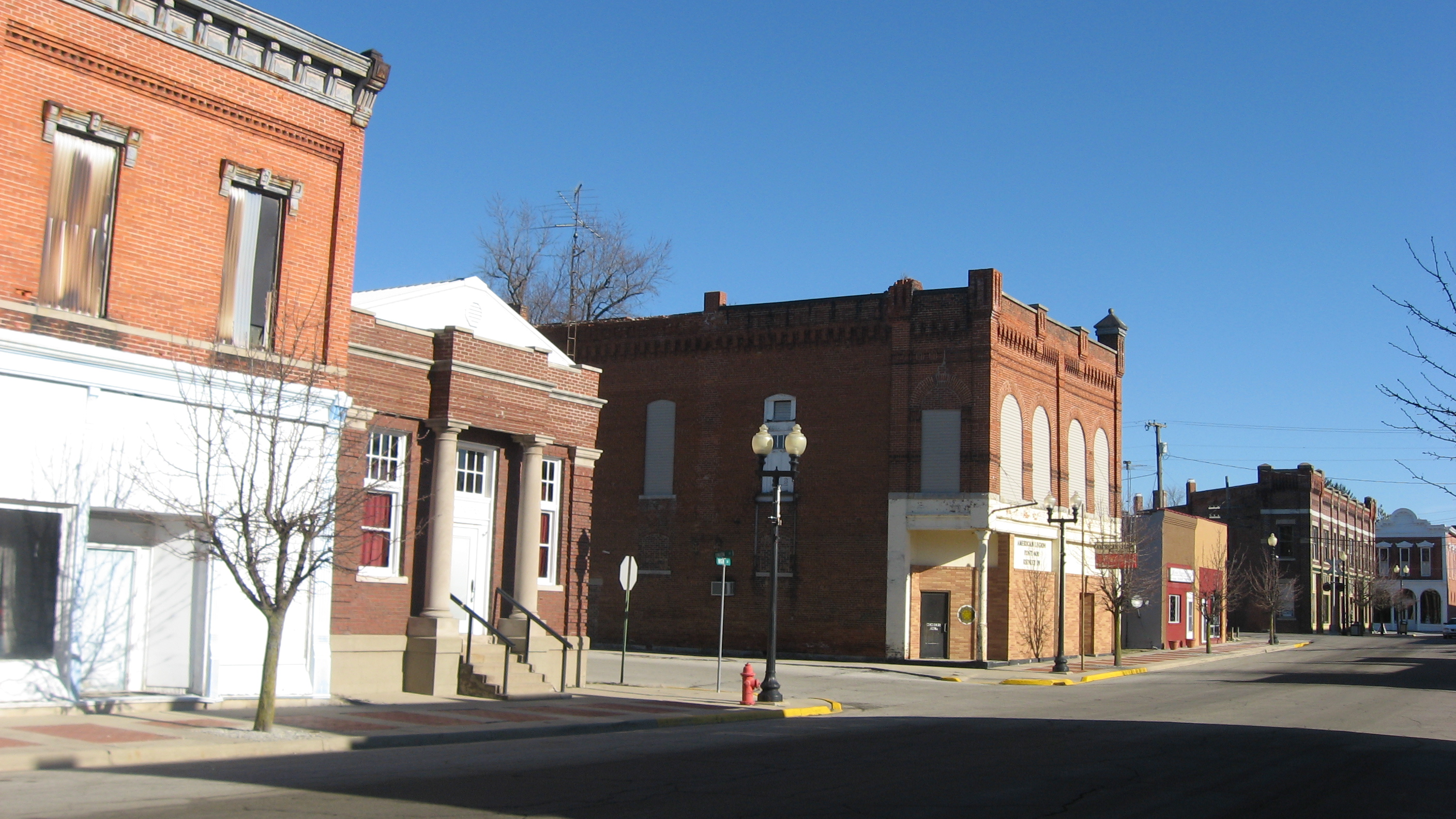
- Union and High in Redkey, January 2012

- Location within Indiana Location within the United States
- Location: Roughly, High St. between Oak and Meridian Sts., Redkey, Indiana
- Coordinates: 40°20′59″N 85°09′07″W
- Area: 7.5 acres (3.0 ha)
- Architect: Sanders, Charles; Taylor & Co.
- Architectural style: Classical Revival, Italianate, Romanesque
- NRHP reference No.: 92001168
- Added to NRHP: September 17, 1992

Redkey Historic District is a national historic district located at Redkey, Indiana. It encompasses 25 contributing buildings in the central business district of Redkey. The district developed between about 1888 and 1935, and includes notable examples of Italianate, Romanesque Revival, and Classical Revival style architecture. Notable buildings include the City Building (1905), Appenseller's Department Store (1906), K of P Building (1911), Farmers and Merchants First National Bank Building (c. 1910), Masonic Lodge (c. 1890, 1910), IOOF Building (c. 1895), Brown-Ellis Block (1888), and Cultice-Mann Block (1891).

It was listed on the National Register of Historic Places in 1992.
