= Jonas Votaw House =

Historic house in Indiana, United States

- U.S. National Register of Historic Places
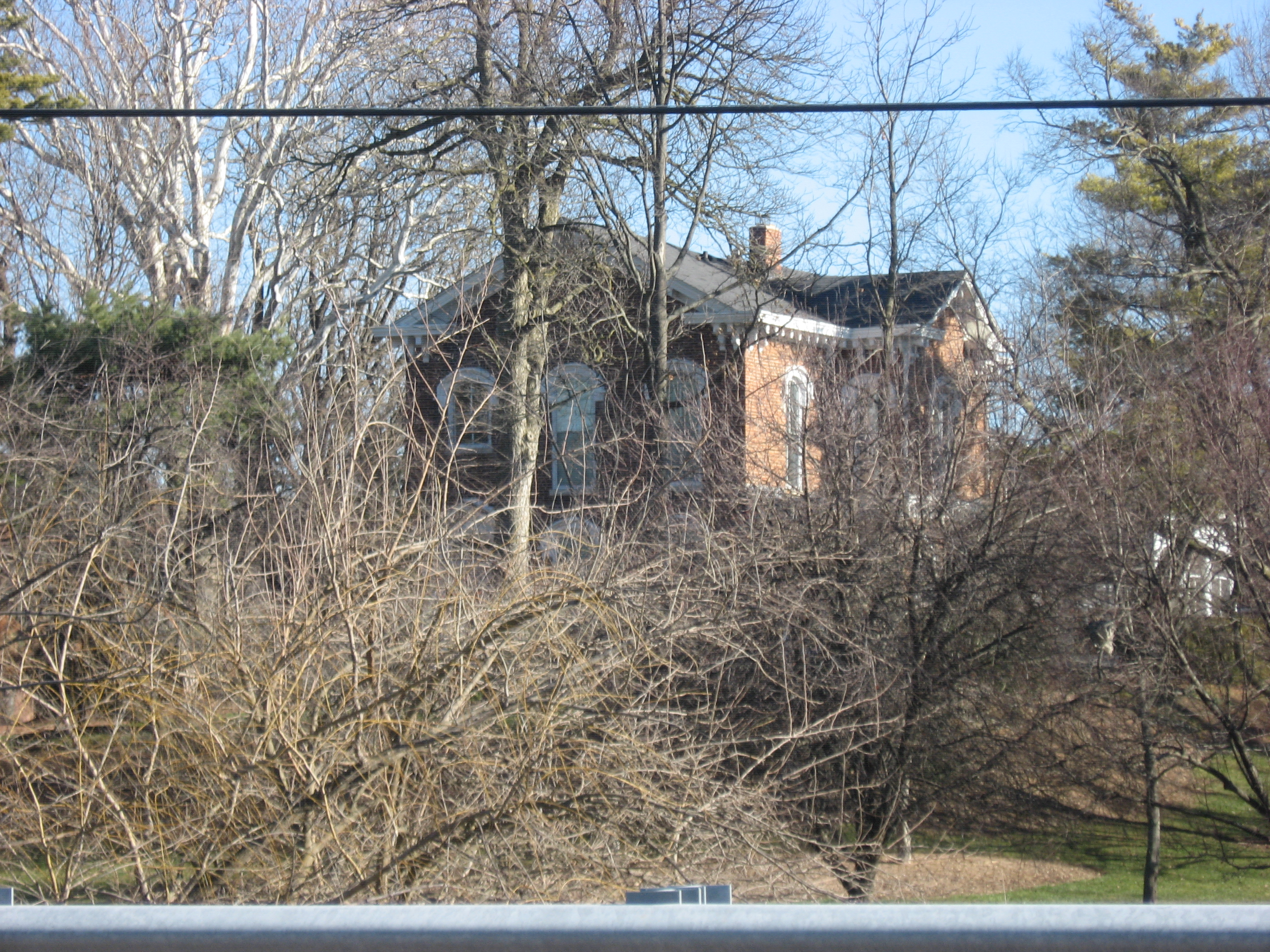
- Jonas Votaw House, January 2012

- Location within Indiana Location within the United States
- Location: 1525 S. Meridian St., Portland, Indiana
- Coordinates: 40°24′47″N 84°58′34″W
- Area: 5 acres (2.0 ha)
- Built: 1875
- Architect: Burke, Jacob; et.al.
- Architectural style: Italianate
- NRHP reference No.: 04001308
- Added to NRHP: December 6, 2004

Jonas Votaw House, also known as the Votaw-Jacqua House, is a historic home located at Portland, Indiana. It was built in 1875, and is a two-story, Italianate style brick dwelling, with additions built in 1925 and 1978. It sits on a stone foundation and has a cross-gable roof. It features an overhanging eaves with cornice, pedimented entrance, and segmental arched windows.

It was listed on the National Register of Historic Places in 2004.
