= New Corydon, Indiana =

- Unincorporated community
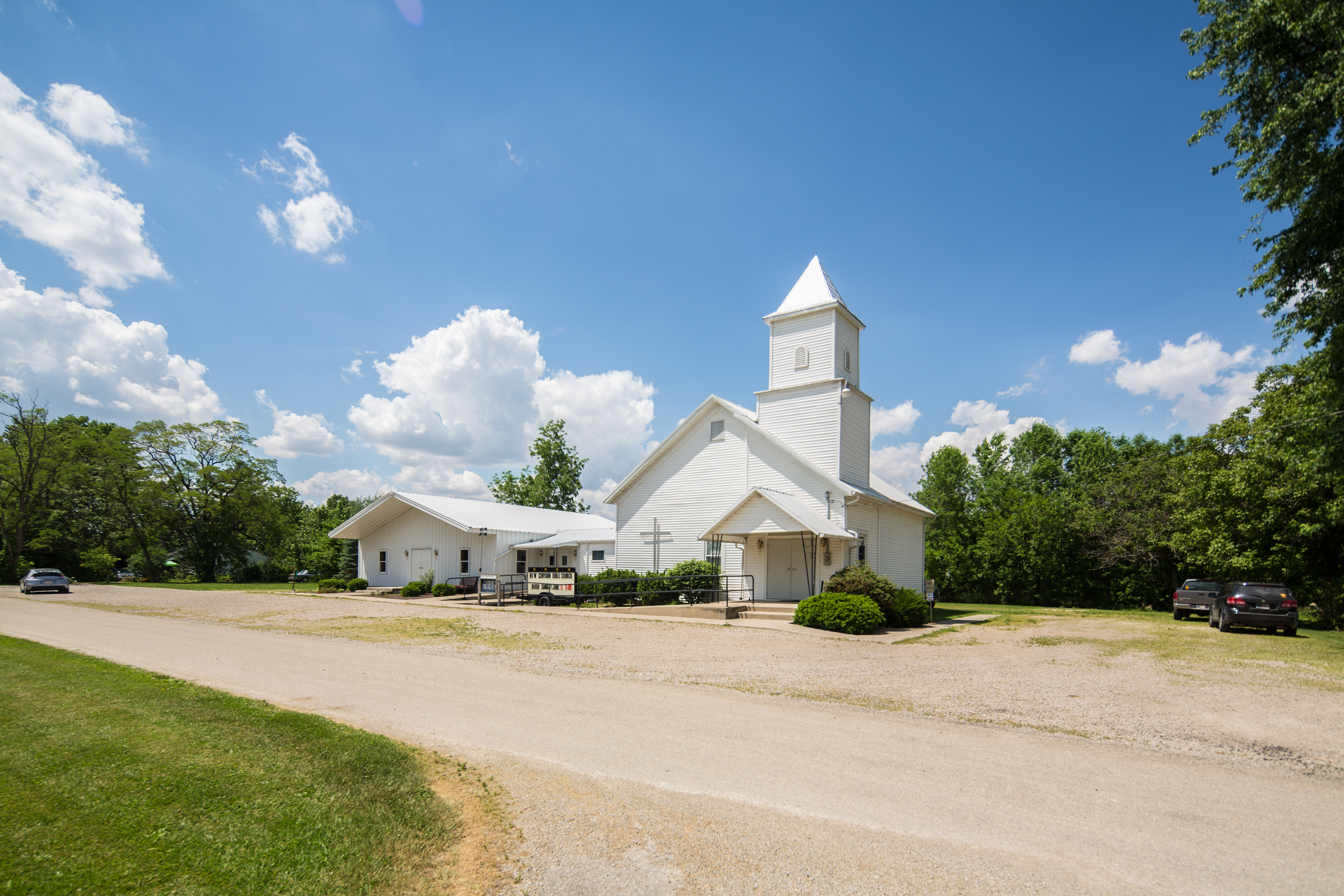

- Location within Indiana Location within the United States
- Coordinates: 40°34′07″N 84°50′24″W
- Country: United States
- State: Indiana
- County: Jay
- Township: Wabash
- Founder: Theopolis Wilson
- Elevation: 846 ft (258 m)
- ZIP code: 47326
- FIPS code: 18-52812
- GNIS feature ID: 440037

New Corydon is an unincorporated community in Wabash Township, Jay County, Indiana.

== History ==
New Corydon was platted in 1844. It took its name after Corydon, Indiana. A post office was established at New Corydon in 1844, and remained in operation until it was discontinued in 1960.
