= Holy Trinity Catholic Church (Trinity, Indiana) =

Historic church in Indiana, United States

- Grouping of Religious Buildings at Trinity
- U.S. National Register of Historic Places
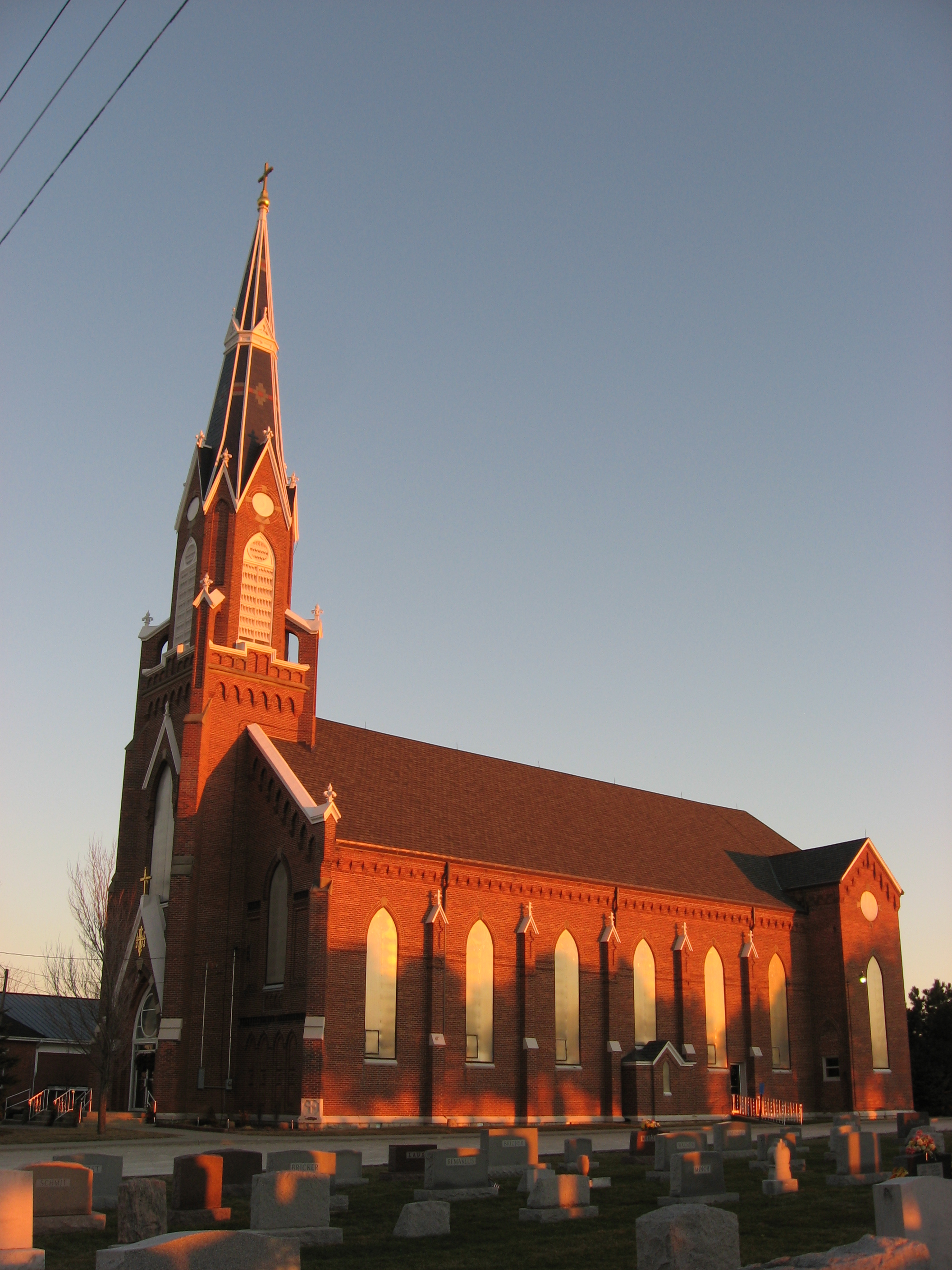
- Holy Trinity Catholic Church, January 2011

- Location within Indiana Location within the United States
- Location: Northeast of Portland at Trinity, Wabash Township, Jay County, Indiana
- Coordinates: 40°32′29″N 84°50′28″W
- Area: 2.8 acres (1.1 ha)
- Built: 1885
- Architect: De Curtins, Anton & Sons
- Architectural style: Italianate, Gothic, Federal
- NRHP reference No.: 80000040
- Added to NRHP: October 23, 1980

Holy Trinity Catholic Church, also known as the Grouping of Religious Buildings at Trinity, is a historic Roman Catholic religious complex located in Wabash Township, Jay County, Indiana. The complex includes the St. Marys of the Woods Convent (moved, Holy Trinity Catholic Church, rectory, and school. The convent (now a private dwelling) was built in 1855, and is a two-story building with a large porch located at the corner of Hwy 67 and CR 850 E. Holy Trinity Catholic Church was built in 1885, and is a Gothic Revival style brick and stone church with a central bell tower with flying buttresses. The two-story brick rectory and two-story brick school were constructed in 1909.

It was listed on the National Register of Historic Places in 1980.

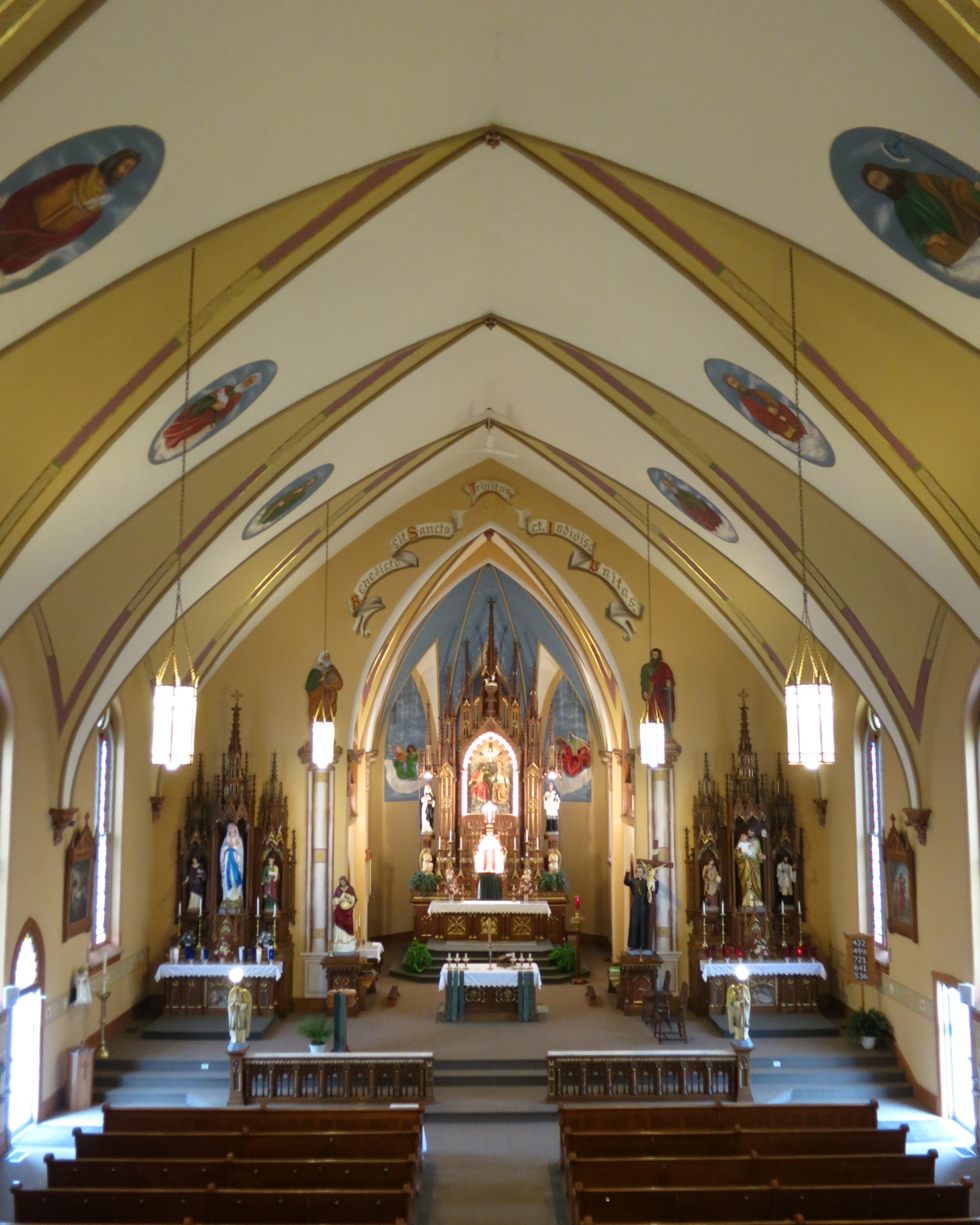
Interior
