= Portland, Indiana =

- City
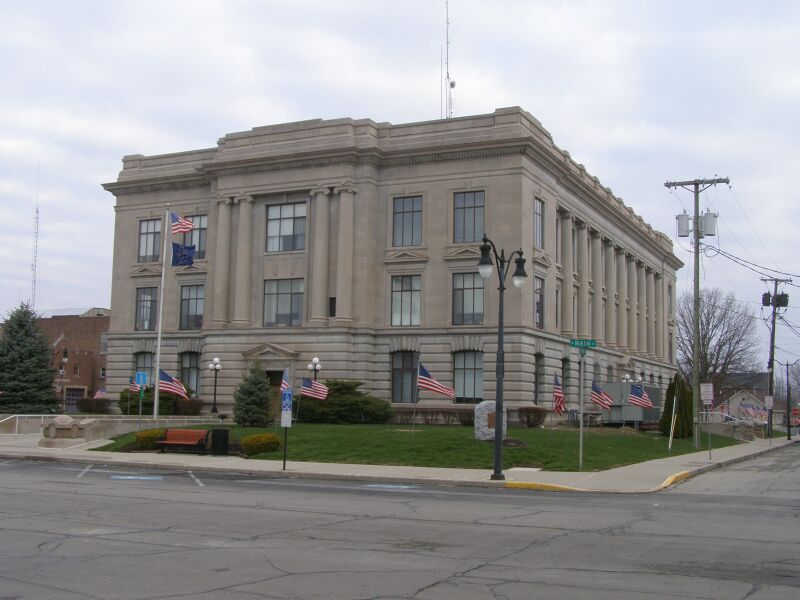
- Jay County Courthouse

- Flag Seal

- Location of Portland in Jay County, Indiana
- Coordinates: 40°26′08″N 85°00′07″W
- Country: United States
- State: Indiana
- County: Jay
- Township: Wayne

Government
  - Mayor: Jeff Westlake (R)

Area
  - Total: 4.88 sq mi (12.63 km^{2})
  - Land: 4.87 sq mi (12.62 km^{2})
  - Water: 0.0039 sq mi (0.01 km^{2}) 0.24%
- Elevation: 906 ft (276 m)

Population (2020)
  - Total: 6,320
  - Estimate (2025): 6,135 ▼
  - Density: 1,297.0/sq mi (500.79/km^{2})
- Time zone: UTC-5 (EST)
  - Summer (DST): UTC-4 (EDT)
- ZIP code: 47371
- Area code: 260
- FIPS code: 18-61236
- GNIS feature ID: 2396259
- Website: www.thecityofportland.net

Portland is a city in and the county seat of Jay County, Indiana, United States. The population was 6,320 at the 2020 census,

== History ==
Portland was platted in 1837. It was named after Portland, Maine.

The Jay County Courthouse, Portland Commercial Historic District, and Jonas Votaw House are listed on the National Register of Historic Places.

== Geography ==
According to the U.S. Census Bureau, Portland has a total area of 4.97 square miles (12.88 km^{2}), of which 1.6 acres (6,524 m^{2}), or 0.05%, are water. The Salamonie River, a west-flowing tributary of the Wabash River, runs through the city just south of its center.

=== Climate ===
Climate data for Portland, Indiana (1991–2020 normals, extremes 1964–present)
Month	Jan	Feb	Mar	Apr	May	Jun	Jul	Aug	Sep	Oct	Nov	Dec	Year
Record high °F (°C)	65 (18)	73 (23)	85 (29)	87 (31)	92 (33)	104 (40)	102 (39)	100 (38)	96 (36)	91 (33)	79 (26)	72 (22)	104 (40)
Mean maximum °F (°C)	56.0 (13.3)	59.7 (15.4)	71.1 (21.7)	80.3 (26.8)	86.4 (30.2)	91.6 (33.1)	93.1 (33.9)	90.6 (32.6)	88.9 (31.6)	82.1 (27.8)	70.0 (21.1)	59.0 (15.0)	94.3 (34.6)
Mean daily maximum °F (°C)	33.8 (1.0)	37.6 (3.1)	48.2 (9.0)	61.6 (16.4)	71.7 (22.1)	80.4 (26.9)	83.7 (28.7)	81.9 (27.7)	76.5 (24.7)	64.3 (17.9)	50.5 (10.3)	38.9 (3.8)	60.8 (16.0)
Daily mean °F (°C)	25.4 (−3.7)	28.3 (−2.1)	37.9 (3.3)	49.7 (9.8)	60.4 (15.8)	69.6 (20.9)	72.8 (22.7)	70.8 (21.6)	64.4 (18.0)	52.7 (11.5)	40.8 (4.9)	30.9 (−0.6)	50.3 (10.2)
Mean daily minimum °F (°C)	17.0 (−8.3)	19.0 (−7.2)	27.7 (−2.4)	37.8 (3.2)	49.2 (9.6)	58.7 (14.8)	61.9 (16.6)	59.6 (15.3)	52.3 (11.3)	41.1 (5.1)	31.1 (−0.5)	22.9 (−5.1)	39.9 (4.4)
Mean minimum °F (°C)	−5.3 (−20.7)	−0.1 (−17.8)	9.1 (−12.7)	23.2 (−4.9)	34.9 (1.6)	45.4 (7.4)	51.5 (10.8)	49.2 (9.6)	37.8 (3.2)	29.0 (−1.7)	17.3 (−8.2)	5.8 (−14.6)	−8.0 (−22.2)
Record low °F (°C)	−29 (−34)	−16 (−27)	−13 (−25)	10 (−12)	27 (−3)	38 (3)	40 (4)	38 (3)	28 (−2)	17 (−8)	4 (−16)	−21 (−29)	−29 (−34)
Average precipitation inches (mm)	2.82 (72)	2.71 (69)	2.80 (71)	3.62 (92)	4.31 (109)	4.55 (116)	4.07 (103)	3.83 (97)	2.97 (75)	2.85 (72)	3.01 (76)	2.39 (61)	39.93 (1,014)
Average snowfall inches (cm)	6.4 (16)	5.4 (14)	3.1 (7.9)	0.3 (0.76)	0.0 (0.0)	0.0 (0.0)	0.0 (0.0)	0.0 (0.0)	0.0 (0.0)	0.1 (0.25)	0.6 (1.5)	3.5 (8.9)	19.4 (49)
Average precipitation days (≥ 0.01 in)	9.8	8.4	9.3	11.1	11.5	10.2	8.3	7.2	7.2	8.4	8.3	9.4	109.1
Average snowy days (≥ 0.1 in)	3.8	3.1	1.3	0.2	0.0	0.0	0.0	0.0	0.0	0.1	0.5	2.1	11.1
Source: NOAA

== Demographics ==
Historical population
Census	Pop.	Note	%±
1870	462		—
1880	1,694		266.7%
1890	3,725		119.9%
1900	4,798		28.8%
1910	5,130		6.9%
1920	5,958		16.1%
1930	5,276		−11.4%
1940	6,362		20.6%
1950	7,064		11.0%
1960	6,999		−0.9%
1970	7,115		1.7%
1980	7,074		−0.6%
1990	6,483		−8.4%
2000	6,437		−0.7%
2010	6,223		−3.3%
2020	6,320		1.6%
2025 (est.)	6,135		−2.9%
U.S. Decennial Census

=== 2020 census ===
As of the 2020 census, Portland had a population of 6,320. The median age was 39.8 years. 23.2% of residents were under the age of 18 and 19.8% of residents were 65 years of age or older. For every 100 females there were 95.1 males, and for every 100 females age 18 and over there were 92.5 males age 18 and over.

99.6% of residents lived in urban areas, while 0.4% lived in rural areas.

There were 2,681 households in Portland, of which 27.6% had children under the age of 18 living in them. Of all households, 36.2% were married-couple households, 24.2% were households with a male householder and no spouse or partner present, and 32.1% were households with a female householder and no spouse or partner present. About 37.5% of all households were made up of individuals and 17.1% had someone living alone who was 65 years of age or older.

There were 3,007 housing units, of which 10.8% were vacant. The homeowner vacancy rate was 2.5% and the rental vacancy rate was 9.7%.

Racial composition as of the 2020 census
Race	Number	Percent
White	5,552	87.8%
Black or African American	28	0.4%
American Indian and Alaska Native	17	0.3%
Asian	31	0.5%
Native Hawaiian and Other Pacific Islander	4	0.1%
Some other race	389	6.2%
Two or more races	299	4.7%
Hispanic or Latino (of any race)	687	10.9%

=== 2010 census ===
At the 2010 census there were 6,223 people, 2,607 households, and 1,620 families living in the city. The population density was 1,338.3 inhabitants per square mile (516.7/km^{2}). There were 3,005 housing units at an average density of 646.2 per square mile (249.5/km^{2}). The racial makup of the city was 94.5% White, 0.4% African American, 0.5% Asian, 3.1% from other races, and 1.5% from two or more races. Hispanic or Latino of any race were 5.8%.

Of the 2,607 households 30.4% had children under the age of 18 living with them, 42.7% were married couples living together, 14.0% single female householder, 5.4% single male householder, and 37.9% were non-families. 32.1% of households were one person and 14.2% were one person aged 65 or older. The average household size was 2.32 and the average family size was 2.89.

The median age was 39.4 years. 23.7% of residents were under the age of 18; 8.6% were between the ages of 18 and 24; 25.1% were from 25 to 44; 24.7% were from 45 to 64; and 17.9% were 65 or older. The gender makeup of the city was 46.8% male and 53.2% female.

== Education ==
The town has a lending library, the Jay County Public Library.

== Notable people ==
- Leon Ames, actor, founder of Screen Actors Guild in 1933
- Stephanie Arnold, competed in women's archery in the 2004 Olympics
- Oscar Ray Bolin, serial killer
- Pete Brewster, professional football player
- Pete Daily, musician
- Kevin A. Ford, astronaut, piloted NASA space shuttle mission to International Space Station in 2009
- Elwood Haynes (born in Portland, 1857) invented the clutch-driven automobile in 1894
- Jack Imel, television producer, Lawrence Welk Show
- Richard T. James, Indiana lieutenant governor 1945–49
- Kenneth MacDonald, actor, born Kenneth Dollins; he worked for many years at Columbia Pictures in short features and in the Three Stooges movies
- Mary Meeker (born in Portland, 1960) investment banker, made Internet economically viable by promoting it to investors in the 1990s, (becoming known as the "Queen of the Internet")
- John P. C. Shanks, U.S. Representative from Indiana, Union Army major general
- Twyla Tharp, Emmy and Tony Award-winning choreographer
- Bill Wallace (born 1945), martial artist
- Greg Williams, WNBA coach, college basketball player at Rice University
